= Municipal elections in Toronto =

Chronological list of municipal elections in Toronto, Ontario, Canada

The following is a list of articles on municipal elections for Toronto City Council in the city of Toronto, Ontario, Canada.

For many years, municipal elections occurred annually in Toronto. After 1956, elections occurred every other year until 1966 after which elections occurred in 1969 and 1972 before reverting to a 2-year cycle. After 1982, elections again occurred every third year and, after the 2006 election the term of city council grew to 4 years.

Toronto's mayor was elected at-large through First past the post.

The four member Toronto Board of Control was introduced with the 1904 election and was accompanied by a reduction in the number of alderman elected per ward from four to three. The Board of Control was abolished with the 1969 municipal election.

Toronto had 39 aldermen (3 elected in each of 13 wards) in 1890 and 1891. In 1892 the number of aldermen was dropped to 24 (4 elected in each of six wards). This number was further reduced in 1910, to 20 elected in 7 wards, then in 1919 it was raised to 24 elected in 8 wards.

All elections of multiple members was by Block Voting, with this exception - in 1903 Toronto adopted Cumulative voting for election of members of the Board of Control and the Board of Education.

For most of the first half of the twentieth century elections were held on or around New Year's Day. Voting day was on the first Monday of December from 1950 until 1978 when it moved to the second Monday in November. Beginning in 2010, election day is on the fourth Monday of October.

== Popular Elections for Council and Appointment of Mayor (1834-1858) ==
| Election | Date | Alderman and Councilmen | Wards | Mayor Appointed by City Council | Yeas | Nays | Source |
|---|---|---|---|---|---|---|---|
| 1855 | January 1 and 2 | 28 | 7 | George William Allan | unanimous | — | |
| 1856 | January 7 and 8 | 28 | 7 | John Beverley Robinson | 15 | 11 | |
| 1857 | January 5 and 6 | 28 | 7 | John Hutchison | 14 | 13 | |
| 1858 | January 4 and 5 | 28 | 7 | William Henry Boulton | unanimous | — | |

== Popular Elections for Mayor and Council (1859-1866) ==
| Election | Date(s) | Mayor | Votes | Runner-up | Votes | Alderman & Councilman | Wards | Source |
|---|---|---|---|---|---|---|---|---|
| 1859 | January 3 and 4 | Adam Wilson | 2,000 | William Henry Boulton | 831 | 28 | 7 | |
| 1860 | January 2 and 3 | Adam Wilson | 2,137 | John Cameron | 1,551 | 28 | 7 | |
| 1861 | January 7 and 8 | John George Bowes | 2,139 | Matthew Crooks Cameron | 1,793 | 28 | 7 | |
| 1862 | January 6 and 7 | John George Bowes | 1,624 | Sam Sherwood | 1,286 | 28 | 7 | |
| 1863 | January 5 and 6 | John George Bowes | 1,943 | William Henderson | 748 | 28 | 7 | |
| 1864 | January 4 and 5 | Francis Henry Medcalf | 2,278 | John George Bowes | 2,122 | 28 | 7 | |
| 1865 | January 2 and 3 | Francis Henry Medcalf | 2,530 | John Cameron | 999 | 28 | 7 | |
| 1866 | January 1 and 2 | Francis Henry Medcalf | acclaimed | — | — | 28 | 7 | |

== Popular Elections for Council and Appointment of Mayor (1867-1873) ==
| Election | Date | Alderman | Wards | Mayor Appointed by City Council | Yeas | Nays |
|---|---|---|---|---|---|---|
| 1867 | January 7 | 21 | 7 | James Edward Smith | 11 | 10 |
| 1868 | January 6 | 21 | 7 | James Edward Smith | acclaimed | — |
| 1869 | January 4 | 21 | 7 | Samuel Bickerton Harman | 13 | 8 |
| 1870 | January 4 | 21 | 7 | Samuel Bickerton Harman | 12 | 8 |
| 1871 | January 2 | 21 | 7 | Joseph Sheard | acclaimed | — |
| 1872 | January 1 | 21 | 7 | Joseph Sheard | No recorded vote | — |
| 1873 | January 6 | 24 | 8 | Alexander Manning | 13 | 6 |

== Popular Elections for Mayor and Council (since 1874) ==
| Election | Date | Mayor | Votes | Runner-up | Votes | Alderman (until 1988)/ Councillors | Wards | Turnout (%) |
|---|---|---|---|---|---|---|---|---|
| 1874 | January 6 | Francis Henry Medcalf | 2,994 | Alexander Mortimer Smith | 2,746 | 24 | 8 | |
| 1875 | January 4 | Francis Henry Medcalf | 3,369 | Andrew Taylor McCord | 2,968 | 24 | 8 | |
| 1876 | January 3 | Angus Morrison | 4,421 | Francis Henry Medcalf | 2,685 | 27 | 9 | |
| 1877 | January 1 | Angus Morrison | 4,640 | Warring Kennedy | 3,662 | 27 | 9 | |
| 1878 | January 7 | Angus Morrison | 3,868 | James Beaty Jr. | 3,269 | 27 | 9 | |
| 1879 | January 6 | James Beaty Jr. | 2,780 | Patrick G. Close | 2,163 | 27 | 9 | |
| 1880 | January 5 | James Beaty Jr. | 4,294 | Angus Morrison | 3,368 | 27 | 9 | |
| 1881 | January 3 | William Barclay McMurrich | 4,119 | Patrick G. Close | 2,944 | 27 | 9 | |
| 1882 | January 3 | William Barclay McMurrich | acclaimed | — | — | 27 | 9 | |
| 1883 | January 4 | Arthur Radcliffe Boswell | 4,289 | William Henry Withrow | 4,284 | 27 | 9 | |
| 1884 | January 7 | Arthur Radcliffe Boswell | acclaimed | — | — | 30 | 10 | |
| 1885 | January 5 | Alexander Manning | 6,029 | William Henry Withrow | 5,874 | 36 | 12 | |
| 1886 | January 4 | William Holmes Howland | 7,762 | Alexander Manning | 6,107 | 36 | 12 | |
| 1887 | January 5 | William Holmes Howland | 9,153 | David Blain | 6,958 | 36 | 12 | |
| 1888 | January 3 | Edward Frederick Clarke | 7,950 | Elias Rogers | 6,853 | 36 | 12 | |
| 1889 | January 7 | Edward Frederick Clarke | acclaimed | — | — | 36 | 12 | |
| 1890 | January 6 | Edward Frederick Clarke | 10,326 | John McMillan | 8,422 | 39 | 13 | |
| 1891 | January 5 | Edward Frederick Clarke | 8,146 | Ernest A. Macdonald | 6,953 | 39 | 13 | |
| 1892 | January 4 | Robert Fleming | 8,581 | Edmund Boyd Osler | 8,204 | 24 | 6 | |
| 1893 | January 2 | Robert Fleming | 11,608 | Warring Kennedy | 8,618 | 24 | 6 | |
| 1894 | January 1 | Warring Kennedy | 13,500 | Robert Fleming | 9,306 | 24 | 6 | |
| 1895 | January 7 | Warring Kennedy | 10,261 | Robert Fleming | 10,212 | 24 | 6 | |
| 1896 | January 6 | Robert Fleming | 10,281 | John Shaw | 8,583 | 24 | 6 | |
| 1897 | January 4 | Robert Fleming | 11,969 | George McMurrich | 10,375 | 24 | 6 | |
| 1898 | January 3 | John Shaw | 12,618 | Ernest A. Macdonald | 8,462 | 24 | 6 | |
| 1899 | January 2 | John Shaw | 11,395 | Ernest A. Macdonald | 10,465 | 24 | 6 | |
| 1900 | January 1 | Ernest A. Macdonald | 11,845 | Edward Frederick Clarke | 9,229 | 24 | 6 | |
| 1901 | January 7 | Oliver Aiken Howland | 12,300 | Francis Stephens Spence | 8,076 | 24 | 6 | |
| 1902 | January 6 | Oliver Aiken Howland | 13,424 | William Findlay Maclean | 8,774 | 24 | 6 | |
| 1903 | January 5 | Thomas Urquhart | 8,634 | Oliver Aiken Howland | 7,887 | 24 | 6 | |
| 1904 | January 1 | Thomas Urquhart | acclaimed | — | — | 24 | 6 | |
| 1905 | January 2 | Thomas Urquhart | 15,173 | George Horace Gooderham | 12,827 | 24 | 6 | |
| 1906 | January 1 | Emerson Coatsworth | 16,425 | Francis Stephens Spence | 12,328 | 24 | 6 | |
| 1907 | January 1 | Emerson Coatsworth | 13,698 | James Lindala | 8,286 | 24 | 6 | |
| 1908 | January 1 | Joseph Oliver | 14,022 | George Reginald Geary | 7,124 | 24 | 6 | |
| 1909 | January 1 | Joseph Oliver | 27,128 | Thomas Davies | 8,127 | 24 | 6 | |
| 1910 | January 1 | George Reginald Geary | 19,017 | Horatio Clarence Hocken | 14,999 | 20 | 7 | |
| 1911 | January 2 | George Reginald Geary | 30,931 | Herbert Capewell | 2,671 | 20 | 7 | |
| 1912 | January 1 | George Reginald Geary | acclaimed | — | — | 20 | 7 | |
| 1913 | January 1 | Horatio Clarence Hocken | 27,983 | Thomas Davies | 9,003 | 20 | 7 | |
| 1914 | January 1 | Horatio Clarence Hocken | 21,471 | Fred McBrien | 16,641 | 20 | 7 | |
| 1915 | January 1 | Tommy Church | 25,520 | Jesse O. McCarthy | 19,573 | 20 | 7 | |
| 1916 | January 1 | Tommy Church | 28,541 | Harry Winberg | 9,880 | 20 | 7 | |
| 1917 | January 1 | Tommy Church | acclaimed | — | — | 20 | 7 | |
| 1918 | January 1 | Tommy Church | 27,587 | R.H. Cameron | 17,995 | 20 | 7 | |
| 1919 | January 1 | Tommy Church | 26,020 | John O'Neill | 16,230 | 24 | 8 | |
| 1920 | January 1 | Tommy Church | 25,689 | Sam McBride | 20,775 | 24 | 8 | |
| 1921 | January 1 | Tommy Church | 35,959 | Sam McBride | 19,966 | 24 | 8 | |
| 1922 | January 1 | Charles A. Maguire | acclaimed | — | — | 24 | 8 | |
| 1923 | January 1 | Charles A. Maguire | 46,362 | R.J. Fleming | 38,961 | 24 | 8 | |
| 1924 | January 1 | W. W. Hiltz | 44,265 | Tommy Church | 33,875 | 24 | 8 | |
| 1925 | January 1 | Thomas Foster | 32,885 | Wesley Hiltz | 31,408 | 24 | 8 | |
| 1926 | January 1 | Thomas Foster | 47,771 | R.H. Cameron | 38,045 | 24 | 8 | |
| 1927 | January 1 | Thomas Foster | 42,617 | Sam McBride | 38,477 | 24 | 8 | |
| 1928 | January 1 | Sam McBride | 50,324 | Thomas Foster | 34,785 | 24 | 8 | |
| 1929 | January 1 | Sam McBride | 47,931 | Brook Sykes | 30,329 | 24 | 8 | |
| 1930 | January 1 | Bert Wemp | 54,309 | Sam McBride | 49,933 | 24 | 8 | |
| 1931 | January 1 | William James Stewart | 57,500 | Sam McBride | 57,110 | 24 | 8 | |
| 1932 | January 1 | William James Stewart | acclaimed | — | — | 26 | 9 | |
| 1933 | January 1 | William James Stewart | 85,407 | Robert Leslie | 26,007 | 26 | 9 | |
| 1934 | January 1 | William James Stewart | 72,536 | H.L. Rogers | 17,222 | 18 | 9 | |
| 1935 | January 1 | James Simpson | 54,400 | Harry W. Hunt | 50,986 | 18 | 9 | |
| Jan. 1936 | January 1 | Sam McBride | 48,723 | Harry W. Hunt | 43,036 | 18 | 9 | |
| Dec. 1936 | December 7 | William D. Robbins | 74,844 | John Laidlaw | 22,018 | 18 | 9 | |
| 1937 | December 6 | Ralph Day | 64,736 | William D. Robbins | 50,779 | 18 | 9 | |
| 1939 | January 2 | Ralph Day | 93,060 | Lewis Duncan | 53,364 | 18 | 9 | |
| 1940 | January 1 | Ralph Day | 61,480 | Lewis Duncan | 38,011 | 18 | 9 | |
| 1941 | January 1 | Frederick J. Conboy | 55,677 | Douglas McNish | 33,024 | 18 | 9 | |
| 1942 | January 1 | Frederick J. Conboy | acclaimed | — | — | 18 | 9 | |
| 1943 | January 1 | Frederick J. Conboy | acclaimed | — | — | 18 | 9 | |
| 1944 | January 1 | Frederick J. Conboy | 78,383 | Lewis Duncan | 58,712 | 18 | 9 | |
| 1945 | January 1 | Robert Hood Saunders | 68,757 | Frederick J. Conboy | 36,299 | 18 | 9 | |
| 1946 | January 1 | Robert Hood Saunders | acclaimed | — | — | 18 | 9 | |
| 1947 | January 1 | Robert Hood Saunders | 92,762 | Frank O'Hearn | 9,477 | 18 | 9 | |
| 1948 | January 1 | Robert Hood Saunders | 118,097 | Ross Dowson | 15,008 | 18 | 9 | |
| 1949 | January 1 | Hiram E. McCallum | 97,715 | Ross Dowson | 23,777 | 18 | 9 | |
| Jan 1950 | January 2 | Hiram E. McCallum | 133,320 | C.H. Mahoney | 19,658 | 18 | 9 | |
| Dec 1950 | December 4 | Hiram E. McCallum | 86,491 | Allan Lamport | 84,987 | 18 | 9 | |
| 1951 | December 3 | Allan Lamport | 72,648 | Hiram E. McCallum | 59,492 | 18 | 9 | |
| 1952 | December 1 | Allan Lamport | 81,448 | Nathan Phillips | 41,923 | 18 | 9 | |
| 1953 | December 7 | Allan Lamport | 55,064 | Arthur Brown | 46,080 | 18 | 9 | |
| 1954 | December 6 | Nathan Phillips | 40,683 | Leslie Saunders | 36,756 | 18 | 9 | |
| 1955 | December 5 | Nathan Phillips | 70,647 | Roy E. Belyea | 26,717 | 18 | 9 | |
| 1956 | December 3 | Nathan Phillips | 80,352 | Ross Dowson | 9,834 | 18 | 9 | |
| 1958 | December 1 | Nathan Phillips | 53,776 | Ford Brand | 30,736 | 18 | 9 | |
| 1960 | December 5 | Nathan Phillips | 81,699 | Allan Lamport | 58,254 | 18 | 9 | |
| 1962 | December 3 | Donald Summerville | 117,031 | Nathan Phillips | 51,933 | 18 | 9 | |
| 1964 | December 7 | Philip Givens | 62,628 | Allan Lamport | 52,143 | 18 | 9 | |
| 1966 | December 5 | William Dennison | 52,742 | Philip Givens | 54,525 | 18 | 9 | |
| 1969 | December 1 | William Dennison | 65,988 | Margaret Campbell | 52,742 | 22 | 11 | |
| 1972 | December 4 | David Crombie | 82,754 | Tony O'Donohue | 58,362 | 22 | 11 | 40% |
| 1974 | December 2 | David Crombie | 100,680 | Don Andrews | 5,662 | 22 | 11 | 27% |
| 1976 | December 6 | David Crombie | 112,763 | Don Andrews | 7,126 | 22 | 11 | 30.5% |
| 1978 | November 13 | John Sewell | 71,885 | Tony O'Donohue | 62,173 | 22 | 11 | 46.4% |
| 1980 | November 10 | Art Eggleton | 87,919 | John Sewell | 86,152 | 22 | 11 | 44.9% |
| 1982 | November 8 | Art Eggleton | 119,387 | A. Hummer | 11,721 | 22 | 11 | 42% |
| 1985 | November 12 | Art Eggleton | 92,994 | Anne Johnston | 59,817 | 22 | 11 | 36.6% |
| 1988 | November 14 | Art Eggleton | 91,180 | Carolann Wright | 24,479 | 16 | 16 | 31% |
| 1991 | November 12 | June Rowlands | 113,993 | Jack Layton | 64,044 | 16 | 16 | 42.9% |
| 1994 | November 12 | Barbara Hall | 70,248 | June Rowlands | 58,952 | 16 | 16 | 36.7% |
| 1997 | November 10 | Mel Lastman | 387,848 | Barbara Hall | 346,452 | 56 | 28 | 45.6% |
| 2000 | November 13 | Mel Lastman | 483,277 | Tooker Gomberg | 51,111 | 44 | 44 | 36.1% |
| 2003 | November 10 | David Miller | 299,385 | John Tory | 263,189 | 44 | 44 | 38.33% |
| 2006 | November 13 | David Miller | 332,969 | Jane Pitfield | 188,932 | 44 | 44 | 39.3% |
| 2010 | October 25 | Rob Ford | 353,519 | George Smitherman | 289,832 | 44 | 44 | 50.55% |
| 2014 | October 27 | John Tory | 394,775 | Doug Ford | 330,610 | 44 | 44 | 54.67% |
| 2018 | October 22 | John Tory | 479,659 | Jennifer Keesmaat | 178,193 | 25 | 25 | 40.9% |
| 2022 | October 24 | John Tory | 342,158 | Gil Peñalosa | 98,525 | 25 | 25 | 29.17% |
| 2023 | June 26 | Olivia Chow | 269,372 | Ana Bailao | 235,175 | 25 | 25 | 38% |
