= List of mayors of Toronto =

Toronto's first mayor, William Lyon Mackenzie, was appointed in 1834 after his Reform coalition won the new City of Toronto's first election and he was chosen by the Reformers. The most recent election to the office of mayor was a by-election on June 26, 2023 in which Olivia Chow was elected. Chow formally took office on July 12, 2023.

If a vacancy occurs, the City of Toronto Act explicitly states that the deputy mayor of Toronto assumes certain limited mayoral powers, but remains deputy mayor during a vacancy. They do not become an acting or interim mayor.

== History ==
From 1834 to 1857, and again from 1867 to 1873, Toronto mayors were not elected directly by the public. Instead, after each annual election of aldermen and councilmen, the assembled council would elect one of their members as mayor. For all other years, mayors were directly elected by popular vote, except in rare cases where a mayor was appointed by council to fill an unexpired term of office. Prior to 1834, Toronto municipal leadership was governed by the Chairman of the General Quarter Session of Peace of the Home District Council.

Through 1955 the term of office for the mayor and council was one year; it then varied between two and three years until a four-year term was adopted starting in 2006. (See List of Toronto municipal elections.)

John Tory, who served from 2014 to 2023, resigned as mayor in February 2023; Deputy Mayor Jennifer McKelvie had assumed some mayoral responsibilities as a result until a successor was chosen.

The "City of Toronto" has changed substantially over the years: the city annexed or amalgamated with neighbouring communities or areas 49 times from in 1883 to 1967. The most sweeping change was in 1998, when the six municipalities comprising Metropolitan Toronto—East York, Etobicoke, North York, Scarborough, York, and the former city of Toronto–and its regional government were amalgamated into a single City of Toronto (colloquially dubbed the "megacity") by an act of the provincial government. The newly created position of mayor for the resulting single-tier mega-city replaced all of the mayors of the former Metro municipalities. It also abolished the office of the Metro Chairman, which had formerly been the most senior political figure in the Metro government before amalgamation.

According to Victor Loring Russell, author of Mayors of Toronto Volume I, 14 out of the first 29 mayors were lawyers. According to Mark Maloney who is writing The History of the Mayors of Toronto, 58 of Toronto's 64 mayors (up to Ford) have been Protestant, white, English-speaking, Anglo-Saxon, property-owning males. There have been three women (Hall, Rowlands, and Chow) and three Jewish mayors (Phillips, Givens and Lastman). According to Jewish religious law Tory is also Jewish, because his matrilineal line is Jewish, but he does not consider himself as Jewish.

Art Eggleton is the longest-serving mayor of Toronto, serving from 1980 until 1991. Eggleton later served in federal politics from 1993 until 2004, and was appointed to the Senate of Canada in 2005. David Breakenridge Read held the post of mayor of Toronto for the shortest period; Read was mayor for only fifty days in 1858.

No Toronto mayor has been removed from office. Toronto's 64th mayor, Rob Ford, lost a conflict of interest trial in 2012, and was ordered to vacate his position; but the ruling was stayed pending an appeal, which Ford won to remain in office. Due to his substance abuse admission and controversy in 2013, Council stripped him of many powers on November 15, transferring them to the deputy mayor. From May until July, 2014, Ford took a leave of absence from the mayoralty to enter drug rehabilitation.

== Original City of Toronto era ==
Appointed by City Council
No.	Mayor	Took office	Left office	Prior political experience
1	William Lyon Mackenzie	1834 (March 27)	1835	Member of the Upper Canada Legislative Assembly for York (1829–1834, expelled several times); Alderman for St. David's Ward (1834)
2	Robert Baldwin Sullivan	1835 (January 15)	1836	Alderman for St. David's Ward (1835)
3	Thomas David Morrison	1836	1837	Member of the Legislative Assembly of Upper Canada for 3rd York (1835–1840); Alderman for St Andrew's Ward (1834–1836)
4	George Gurnett	1837	1838	Alderman for St. George's Ward (1834–1850)
5	John Powell	1838	1841	Alderman for St. Andrew's Ward (1837–1841)
6	George Monro	1841	1842	Alderman for St. Lawrence’s Ward (1834–1835, 1837–1845)
7	Henry Sherwood	1842	1845	Member of the Legislative Assembly of Upper Canada for Brockville (1836–1840); Alderman for St. David's Ward (1842–1849); Member of the Legislative Assembly of the Province of Canada for Toronto (1843–1851)
8	William H. Boulton	1845	1848	Alderman for St. Patrick's Ward (1838–1843, 1844–1852); Mayor (1845–1847); Member of the Legislative Assembly of the Province of Canada for Toronto (1844–1853)
–	George Gurnett (2nd incumbency)	1848	1851	Alderman for St. George's Ward (1834–1850)
9	John George Bowes	1851	1854	Alderman for St. James's Ward (1850–1853)
10	Joshua George Beard	1854	1855	Alderman for St. Lawrence Ward (1834–1854); Toronto School Board of Trustees (1850–1864)
11	George William Allan	1855	1856	Alderman for St. David Ward (1849–1855)
12	John Beverley Robinson	1856	1857	Alderman for St. Patrick's Ward (1851, 1853–54, 1856–57)
13	John Hutchison	1857	1858 (resigned)	Alderman for St. James Ward (1852–1853, 1856–1857)
–	William H. Boulton (2nd incumbency)	1858	1858 (resigned November 8)	Alderman for St. Patrick's Ward (1838–1843, 1844–1852); Mayor (1845–1847); Member of the Legislative Assembly of the Province of Canada for Toronto (1844–1853); Alderman for St. Andrew's Ward (1858)
14	David Breakenridge Read	1858 (November 11)	1858 (December 31)	Alderman for St. Patrick's Ward (1858)

Elected directly by the public
No.	Mayor	Took office	Left office	Prior political experience
15	(Sir) Adam Wilson	1859	1861	Alderman for St. Patrick's Ward (1855)
–	John George Bowes (2nd incumbency)	1861	1864	Alderman for St. James's Ward (1850) Alderman for St. James's Ward and Mayor (1851–1853); Alderman for St. David's Ward (1856)
16	Francis Henry Medcalf	1864	1867	Alderman for St. Lawrence Ward (1860); Alderman for St. David's Ward (1863)

Appointed by City Council
No.	Mayor	Took office	Left office	Prior political experience
17	James Edward Smith	1867	1869	Alderman for St. John's Ward (1857–1867)
18	Samuel Bickerton Harman	1869	1871	Alderman for St Andrew's Ward (1866–1868, 1871–1872)
19	Joseph Sheard	1871	1873	Alderman for St. Patrick's Ward (1851–1871)
20	Alexander Manning	1873	1874	Alderman for St. Lawrence Ward (1856–1858, 1867–1873)

Elected directly by the public
No.	Mayor	Took office	Left office	Prior political experience
–	Francis Henry Medcalf (2nd incumbency)	1874	1875	Alderman for St. Lawrence Ward (1860); Alderman for St. David's Ward (1863, 1867–1868); Mayor (1864–1867)
21	Angus Morrison	1876	1878	Alderman for St. James (1853–1854); Member of the Legislative Assembly of the Province of Canada for North Simcoe (1854–1863) and Niagara (1864–1867); Member of Parliament (1867–1874)
22	James Beaty	1879	1880	Alderman for St. James's Ward (1877)
23	William Barclay McMurrich	1881	1882	Alderman for St. Patrick's Ward (1879–1880)
24	Arthur Radcliffe Boswell	1883	1884	Alderman for St. George's Ward (1877–1879, 1882)
–	Alexander Manning (2nd incumbency)	1885	1885	Alderman for St. Lawrence Ward (1856–1858, 1867–1873); Mayor (1873)
25	William Holmes Howland	1886	1887	President of the Toronto Board of Trade (1874–75); President of the Dominion Board of Trade (1874); President of the Manufacturers’ Association of Ontario (1877–78)
26	Edward Frederick Clarke	1888	1891	Member of the Legislative Assembly for Toronto (1886–1894)
27	Robert John Fleming	1892	1893	Alderman for St. David's Ward (1886–1890)
28	Warring Kennedy	1894	1895	Alderman for St. John's Ward (1871)
–	Robert John Fleming (2nd incumbency)	1896	1897 (resigned August 5)	Alderman for St. David's Ward (1886–1890); Mayor (1892)
29	John Shaw	1897 (August 6)	1899	Alderman for St. Paul's Ward (1883–1895); Alderman for Ward 3 (1897)
30	Ernest A. Macdonald	1900	1900	Alderman for St. Matthew's Ward (1886–1887, 1889–1890); Alderman for Ward 1 (1896)
31	Oliver Aiken Howland	1901	1902	Member of the Legislative Assembly for Toronto South (1894–1898)
32	Thomas Urquhart	1903	1905	Alderman for Ward 4 (1900–1902)
33	Emerson Coatsworth	1906	1907	Member of Parliament for Toronto East (1891–1896); Alderman for Ward 2 (1904–1905)
34	Joseph Oliver	1908	1909	Toronto School Board Trustee (1885); Alderman for Ward 2 (1895, 1901–1903 (also Board of Control) and 1906)
35	George Reginald Geary	1910	1912 (resigned October 21)	Toronto School Board Trustee (1904); Alderman for Ward 3 (1905–1908); Toronto Board of Control (1909)
36	Horatio C. Hocken	1912	1914	Toronto Board of Control (1907–1909, 1911–1912)
37	Thomas Langton Church	1915	1921	Toronto School Board Trustee (1899–1904); Alderman for Ward 2 (1905–1909); Toronto Board of Control (1910–1914)
38	Charles A. Maguire	1922	1923	Alderman for Ward 3 (1909–1912, 1914–1917); Toronto Board of Control (1918–1921)
39	W. W. Hiltz	1924	1924	Toronto School Board Trustee (1911–1913) Alderman for Ward 1 (1914–1920); Toronto Board of Control (1921–1923)
40	Thomas Foster	1925	1927	Alderman for St. David Ward (1891–1892, 1894); Alderman for Ward 2 (1900–1909); Toronto Board of Control (1910, 1912–1913, 1915–1917, 1922–1924)
41	Sam McBride	1928	1929	Alderman for Ward 3 (1905–1916); Toronto Board of Control (1917–1918, 1926, 1932–1935); Alderman for Ward 4 (1924–1925); Toronto Board of Control (1917–1918, 1926)
42	Bert Sterling Wemp	1930	1930	Toronto School Board Trustee (1921–1922); Alderman for Ward 2 (1924–1925); Toronto Board of Control (1927–1929)
43	William James Stewart	1931	1934	Alderman for Ward 5 (1924–1930)
44	James Simpson	1935	1935	Toronto School Board Trustee (1905–1910); Toronto Board of Control (1914, 1930–1934)
–	Sam McBride (2nd incumbency)	1936	1936 (died November 10)	Alderman for Ward 3 (1905–1916); Toronto Board of Control (1917–1918, 1926, 1932–1935); Alderman for Ward 4 (1924–1925); Mayor (1928–1929)
45	William D. Robbins	1936 (November 18)	1937	Alderman for Ward 1 (1913–1917, 1923); Toronto Board of Control (1918–1919, 1925, 1928, 1930–1936)
46	Ralph C. Day	1938	1940	Alderman for Ward 1 (1931–1934); Toronto Board of Control (1935—1937)
47	Frederick J. Conboy	1941	1944	Alderman for Ward 6 (1935–1936); Toronto Board of Control (1937–1940)
48	Robert Hood Saunders	1945	1948 (resigned February 23)	Alderman for Ward 4 (1935–1936, 1940); Toronto Board of Control (1941–1944)
49	Hiram E. McCallum	1948	1951	Alderman for Ward 8 (1941–1943); Toronto Board of Control (1945–1948)

== Metro Toronto era (1953–1997) ==
From 1953, Toronto was part of a federated municipality known as Metropolitan Toronto. This regional entity had the same boundaries as present-day Toronto, but consisted of the City of Toronto and 12 other municipalities, each with its own mayor and council. From 1953 to 1997, the most senior political figure in the Metropolitan Toronto government was the Chairman of the Municipality of Metropolitan Toronto (for a list of Metro Chairmen, see Chairman of the Municipality of Metropolitan Toronto). In 1967, (during the incumbency of William Dennison), an internal amalgamation eliminated the seven smallest municipalities in Metropolitan Toronto. Of these, the villages of Forest Hill and Swansea were amalgamated into the City of Toronto.

No.	Mayor	Took office	Left office	Prior political experience	Deputy Mayor
50	Allan Lamport	January 1, 1952	June 28, 1954	Alderman for Ward 2 (1937); MPP for St. David (1937–1943); Ward 3 (1946–1948); Toronto Board of Control (1950–1952)	N/A
51	Leslie Howard Saunders	June 28, 1954	December 31, 1954	Alderman in North Bay (1918–1924); Toronto School Trustee (1936–1938); Alderman for Ward 1 (Riverdale) (1942–1945); Toronto Board of Control (1949–1954)	Nathan Phillips
52	Nathan Phillips	January 1, 1955	December 31, 1962	Alderman for Ward 4 (St. Andrew) (1926–1955)	N/A
53	Donald Dean Summerville	January 1, 1963	November 19, 1963 (died in office)	Alderman for Ward 8 (The Beaches) (1955–1958); Toronto Board of Control (1958–1961)	Philip Givens
54	Philip Givens	November 19, 1963 (acting mayor, appointed permanently on November 25)	December 31, 1966	Alderman for Ward 5 (Trinity–Bellwoods) (1951—1960); Toronto Board of Control (1960—1963); President of City Council (1963)	Allan Lamport
55	William Dennison	January 1, 1967	December 31, 1972	Toronto School Trustee (1938–1941); Alderman for Ward 2 (Rosedale and Cabbagetown) (1941–1943); MPP for St. David (1943—1945, 1948—1951); Toronto Board of Control (1958–1963)	N/A
56	David Crombie	January 1, 1973	August 31, 1978	Alderman for Ward 11 (North Toronto) (1969–1972)	Fred Beavis
57	Fred Beavis	September 1, 1978	November 30, 1978	Alderman for Ward 1 (Riverdale) (1956–1978)	Anne Johnston
58	John Sewell	December 1, 1978	November 30, 1980	Alderman for Ward 7 (Regent Park and Riverdale) (1969–1978)	Art Eggleton
59	Art Eggleton	December 1, 1980	November 30, 1991	Alderman for Ward 4 (Trinity Bellwoods and Little Italy) (1969–1980)	N/A
60	June Rowlands	December 1, 1991	November 30, 1994	Alderman/City Councillor for Ward 10 (North Toronto and Rosedale) (1976–1988); Chairman of the Toronto Police Commission (1988–1991)	
61	Barbara Hall	December 1, 1994	December 31, 1997	City Councillor for Ward 7 (Regent Park and Riverdale) (1985–1994)	N/A

== Post-amalgamation era ==
As of 1998, Metropolitan Toronto and all its constituent municipalities were amalgamated into a single City of Toronto. Under the City of Toronto Act, 2006, the mayor is the head of council and the chief executive officer of the City.

The deputy mayor is appointed by the mayor from among the elected members of the City Council. The deputy mayor acts in place of the mayor whenever the incumbent is unable to be present to perform his normal functions and duties, assists the mayor, and serves as vice-chair of the city council's executive committee.

On November 18, 2013, city council removed most powers from the office of mayor for the term of the current Council, including chairing the executive committee. These powers were given to the office of the deputy mayor, held by Norm Kelly at the time of the motion. The action occurred after Mayor Rob Ford admitted to drug abuse. On May 1, 2014, Ford started a leave of absence for drug rehabilitation. Kelly took over the remainder of the mayoral duties and powers at that time. When Rob Ford returned on July 1, he once again returned to having the duties he had immediately prior to the leave.

On February 10, 2023, Mayor John Tory announced that he would resign as the mayor, after admitting that he had had a multi-year affair with a former staffer during the COVID-19 pandemic. Tory also said that the relationship had been referred to the City's integrity commissioner for review. Deputy Mayor Jennifer McKelvie performed the duties of the mayor's office with limited powers, until the election of Tory's successor. On June 26, 2023, Chow was elected as mayor of Toronto. She took office on July 12, 2023.

No.	Mayor	Term	Election	Previous office	Deputy Mayor
62	Mel Lastman	January 1, 1998 – November 30, 2003	1997 2000	North York Board of Control (1970–1973); Mayor of North York (1973–1997); Metro Councillor (1970–1997)	Case Ootes
63	David Miller	December 1, 2003 – November 30, 2010	2003 2006	Metro Councillor for High Park (1994–1997); City Councillor for Ward 19 (High Park) (1997–2000); City Councillor for Ward 13 (High Park) (2000–2003)	Joe Pantalone
64	Rob Ford	December 1, 2010 – November 30, 2014	2010	City Councillor for Ward 2 (Etobicoke North) (2000–2010)	Doug Holyday (2010–2013); Norm Kelly (2013–2014)
65	John Tory	December 1, 2014 – February 17, 2023	2014 2018 2022	Leader of the Progressive Conservative Party of Ontario (2004–2009); MPP for Dufferin—Peel—Wellington—Grey (2005–2007)	Ana Bailão (2014–2022); Denzil Minnan-Wong (2014–2022); Jennifer McKelvie (2022–2023)
66	Olivia Chow	July 12, 2023 – Incumbent	2023 2026	MP for Trinity-Spadina (2006–2014); Toronto City Councillor for Ward 20 Trinity—Spadina (1992–2005)	Jennifer McKelvie (2023); Ausma Malik (2023–Present)

== Post-mayoral honours ==
A few former mayors have been honoured with places, things or buildings named in their honour. Unless otherwise stated the following are all located in Toronto:

- George William Allan – Allan Gardens
- William Henry Boulton – Boulton Avenue
- David Crombie – David Crombie Park
- Art Eggleton – Art Eggleton Park
- Thomas Foster – Thomas Foster Memorial Temple in Uxbridge, Ontario, built by him privately and named after his death.
- Barbara Hall – Barbara Hall Park
- Allan A. Lamport – Lamport Stadium
- Mel Lastman – Mel Lastman Square
- William Lyon Mackenzie – current Toronto Fire Services fireboat WL Mackenzie and William Lyon Mackenzie Collegiate Institute
- Alexander Manning – Manning Arcade (c. 1884 and demolished 1954 after 1953 fires) and Manning Chambers (annex to Old City Hall and demolished to make way for Toronto City Hall 1960s)
- Sam McBride – current Toronto Island ferry boat Sam McBride
- George Monro – Munro Park (former amusement park, now residential area) and Munro Park Avenue
- Nathan Phillips – Nathan Phillips Square
- June Rowlands – June Rowlands Park
- Robert Hood Saunders – R.H. Saunders – St. Lawrence Station, a power station dam power dam in Cornwall, Ontario
- Joseph Sheard – (The Mayor) Joseph Sheard Parkette
- Donald Dean Summerville – Donald Dean Summerville Swimming Pool
- Rob Ford – Rob Ford Stadium in Etobicoke (formerly Centennial Park Stadium)

== See also ==
- List of Toronto municipal elections
- Metro Chairman – the most senior political figure in Metropolitan Toronto until 1997
- List of reeves of the former townships and villages in Toronto

== Bibliography ==
- Russell, Victor (1982). Mayors of Toronto, Volume 1 1834–1899. Erin, Ontario: Boston Mills Press. ISBN 0-919822-77-0.
