= 1855 Toronto municipal election =

City of Toronto 1855 Municipal Election
← 1854	January 1, 1855	1856 →

All 28 members of Toronto City Council Mayor appointed by majority of City Council
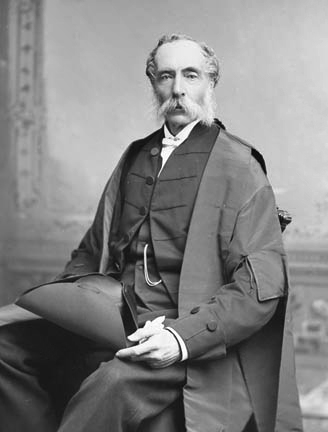
Nominees for Mayor
Candidate	George William Allan (acclaimed)

The 1855 City of Toronto Municipal Election was the City's 21st municipal election. Polling occurred on the first Monday and Tuesday of the year, January 1st and 2nd. Elections for Aldermen and Councilmen were held in seven wards and for the Municipal License Inspector. Violence and intimidation over political control of St. John's Ward by candidates who represented the Orange Order marred the election.

Samuel Reid, the nephew of James Spence, a candidate for licence inspector, was fatally wounded on the second day of the election. Joseph Sheard, a reformist candidate for Alderman and Joseph Rowell, a councilman candidate, were also injured in attacks attributed to their opponent's supporters. Sheard and Rowell initially lost the election, but because of the violence, they disputed the results. Following a judicial review, the court found that Sheard won by four votes and forced a by-election for Councilmen, which Rowell won in March 1855.

After the election, George William Allan, the heir of one of Toronto's wealthiest men, banker William Allan, was appointed mayor by City Council.

== Background ==
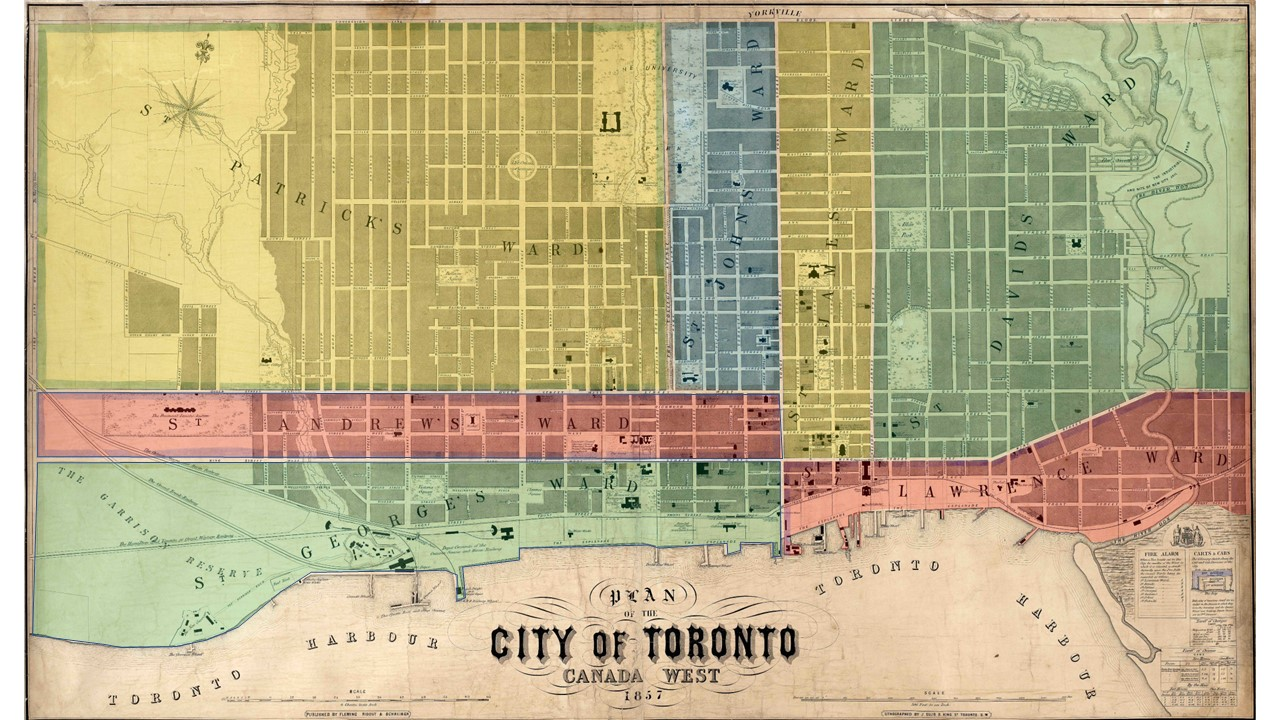
Plan of the City of Toronto Canada West 1857. // Published by Fleming Ridout & Schreiber. The City's seven wards are shown. St. John's Ward is in the centre in blue

By the 1850s, the Orange Order was a powerful force in Toronto's municipal politics. The Order negotiated a middle ground between the traditional power blocks in local government, the Family Compact and Reform movement. The Orange Order aimed to ensure that its members benefited from patronage appointments.

St. John's Ward, Toronto's newest ward, was created in 1853 by the division of St. Patrick's Ward. The new ward was the poorest of the City's seven wards and a predominantly Irish protestant working-class neighbourhood and home to much of Toronto's small Black community. During the 1855 election, it was the site of a clash between incumbent reformers and ambitious Orangemen. The incumbents were Alderman Joseph Sheard, Councilmen Joseph Rowell and John Bugg, and Orangeman John Hillyard Cameron. The Orangemen Richard Dempsey and Robert (Bob) Moodie ran to oppose Sheard and Rowell.

Outside St. John's Ward race was centred on tax rates and city expenditures. The City was embarking on large infrastructure projects to support the railways. In 1854, City Council awarded £150,000 to Gzowksi and Company to build the Esplanade, so that railways could enter and cross the City along the waterfront. The 1855 Council would revisit and rescind the contract.

=== The St. John's Ward Election and By-election ===
On January 2, 1855, a crowd gathered around the polling place in St. John's Ward on the second voting day. They occupied the street, guarded the door, and only allowed voters to enter if they promised to vote for Dempsey and Moodie. In the afternoon, the crowd attacked Sheard and Rowell. In the attack, Sheard was thrown onto a pile of lumber and cut on the wrist by a knife. Rowell was injured when to trying to assist Sheard. When the dust settled, Dempsey won by four votes and Moodie by 42 votes.

That same evening after the polls had closed, Samuel Reid was fatally stabbed. The fallout from the murder shook the ward. The police arrested eight people before the individual responsible was arrested after his name was discovered etched on the murder weapon. Reid could not vote but was active in the election through his membership in the Orange Order and the local fire hall. He was possibly a beneficiary of municipal patronage through his occupation as a Carter, which required a license. Ultimately the trial of the accused led to an acquittal on the grounds of self-defence.

Following the murder and violent attacks, Sheard and Rowell initiated legal proceedings to dispute the election results. The Court found that Dempsey had received eight votes from individuals who were not legally entitled to vote in St. John's Ward. As a result, Sheard was elected as the Alderman by a majority of 4 votes. The Court also ruled that "the freedom of the election was violated," ordering new elections for the place of Councilmen. On February 20, 1855, City Council unseated Dempsey and Moodie, administered Sheard's oath of office, and called for new elections to fill the vacancy for Councilmen.

Both Rowell and Moodie stood in the new election. Rowell was elected on March 1, 1855, by a majority of 10 votes. There was no repeat of the violence on election day, but at least one instance of intimidation by Mr. Moodie's supporters targeting the ward's Black residents in the week before the election. A group of Moodie's supporters interrupted a meeting of Black residents refusing to allow anyone to speak in support of Rowell.

=== Appointment of the Mayor ===
City Council appointed the Mayor at the first meeting after the election on January 15, 1855, selecting candidates from a list of elected Alderman. Generally, the Council considered seniority and experience. The incumbent Mayor, Joshua George Beard, did not run for reelection in 1855 after experiencing a severe illness the previous winter.

John Hillyard Cameron moved and John Smith seconded the resolution to elect George William Allan as Mayor. John Duggan had canvassed City Council before the meeting to secure the election but "had wisely withdrawn his name to prevent any unseemly contest." Following his unanimous election by the City Council Allan spoke to healing the Council's partisan differences, focusing on the infrastructure projects underway, and reducing taxes.

== City Council Results ==
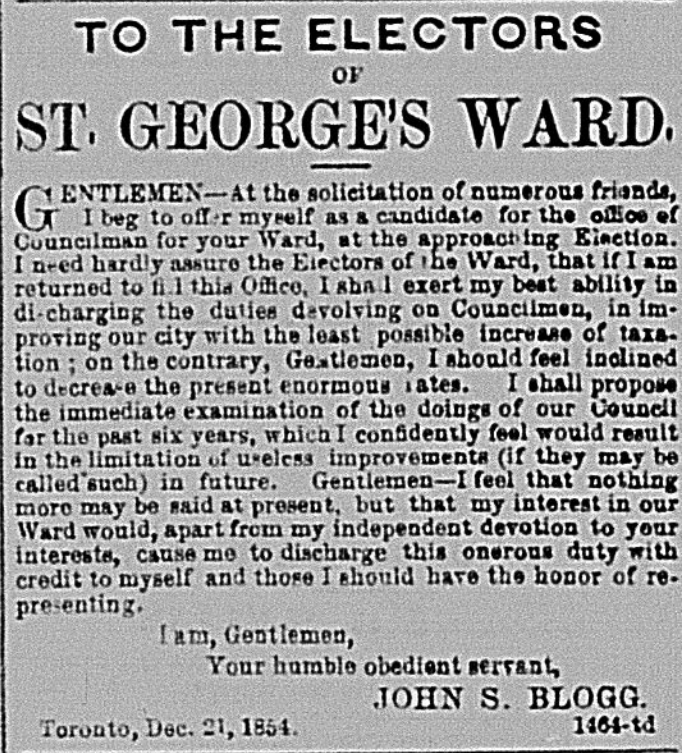
A typical ad for the 1855 election in the Globe.

Each ward elected 2 Aldermen and 2 Councilmen. There were nine open seats in the 1855 election, and 19 members of the City Council stood for re-election. Two incumbents lost, Angus Morrison (elected to the Provincial assembly in the summer of 1854) and William Graham.

St. James' Ward
Position	Candidate		Votes	%
Aldermen	C.E. Romain (X)	Elected	492	43.5%
Aldermen	James Good		456	40.4%
Aldermen	Angus Morrison(X)		182	16.1%
Councilmen	Alexander Mortimer Smith		368	33.8%
Councilmen	John Wilson	Elected	327	30.1%
Councilmen	William Kisseck		149	13.7%
St. Andrew's Ward
Position	Candidate		Votes	%
Aldermen	John Carr (X)	Elected	331	42.0%
Aldermen	R.P. Crooks	Elected	282	35.7%
Aldermen	Ogle Robert Gowan	Lost	176	22.3%
Councilmen	E.B. Gilbert (X)	Elected	229	27.7%
Councilmen	Henry Prettie	Elected	229	27.7%
Councilmen	William Graham (X)	Lost	221	26.8%
Councilmen	Charles Fisher	Lost	147	17.8%
St. John's Ward
Position	Candidate		Votes	%
Aldermen	John Hillyard Cameron (X)	Elected	352	35.5%
Aldermen	Joseph Sheard (X)	Elected by court order	322*	33.4%
Aldermen	Richard Dempsey	Unseated by court order	318*	32.1%
Councilmen	John Bugg (X)	Elected	356	35.8%
Councilmen	Robert Moodie	Unseated by court order	340	34.2%
Councilmen	Joseph Rowell (X)	Elected in a by-election	298	30.0%
*Votes reflect total determined by the Court.
St. David's Ward
Position	Candidate		Votes	%
Aldermen	George William Allan (X)	Elected	382	46.9%
Aldermen	William Henderson	Elected	328	40.2%
Aldermen	Charles Lynes	Lost	105	12.9%
Councilmen	Adam Beatty (X)	Elected	342	42.9%
Councilmen	John Carruthers (X)	Elected	297	37.3%
Councilmen	George Humphrey	Lost	158	19.8%
St. Lawrence Ward
Position	Candidate		Votes	%
Aldermen	John Smith	Elected	226	41.2%
Aldermen	William Gooderham	Elected	174	31.7%
Aldermen	Alexander Manning	Lost	149	27.1%
Councilmen	William Murphy (X)	Elected	199	37.7%
Councilmen	Thomas McConkey (X)	Elected	167	31.6%
Councilmen	James Stock	Lost	162	30.7%
St. George's Ward
Position	Candidate		Votes	%
Aldermen	John Duggan (X)	Elected	136	47.6%
Aldermen	G.A. Philpotts	Elected	102	35.7%
Aldermen	Frederick Chase Capreol	Lost	14	4.9%
Aldermen	A.K. Boomer	Lost	34	11.9%
Councilmen	Andrew Drummond	Elected	132	31.5%
Councilmen	Edward Wright (X)	Elected	93	31.5%
Councilmen	James Myers	Lost	70	23.7%
St. Patrick's Ward
Position	Candidate		Votes	%
Aldermen	Johnathan Dunn (X)	Elected	174	50.7%
Aldermen	Adam Wilson	Elected	169	49.3%
Councilmen	Thomas Mara (X)	Elected	176	49.7%
Councilmen	Theophilus Earls (X)	Elected	152	42.9%
Councilmen	W. H. Smith	Lost	26	7.3%
