= 1856 Toronto municipal election =

← 1855	January 7, 1856	1857 →
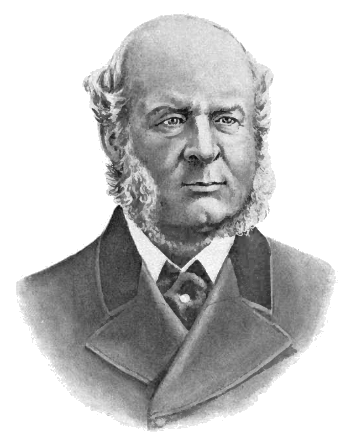

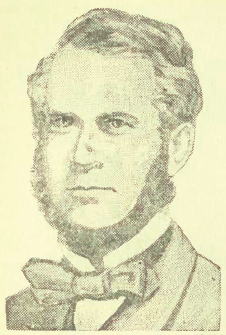
Candidate	John Beverley Robinson	John Hutchison
Electoral vote	15	11

The 1856 City of Toronto Municipal Election was the city's 22nd municipal election. Polling occurred on the first Monday and Tuesday of the year, January 7 and 8. Elections for Aldermen and Councilmen were held in seven wards and for the Municipal License Inspector.

After the election, John Beverley Robinson a member of the family compact and strong supporter of the railroads, was elected Mayor by City Council, beating John Hutchison a Toronto merchant, who had a reputation for opposing corruption.

== Background ==
By the standards of 1850s civic politics, where riots disrupted voting in 1855 and 1857, the election of the Council for 1856 was quiet. The issues that animated the campaign included awarding a major public works contract to complete The Esplanade, the controversy around establishing Separate Schools for Roman Catholics, and taverns licenses.

=== The Esplanade Contract ===
In 1853, the City of Toronto passed the Esplanade Act to fill in land along the city's waterfront to provide a route for railways to cross the city and a public promenade along the waterfront. The contract was awarded to Gzowski and Company to construct the Esplanade, but multiple issues created a scandal, and in April 1855, City Council voted to annul the contract. However, the decision to cancel the contract led the Grand Trunk Railway, depending on the waterfront route, to threaten to place its track along Queen Street. This led to numerous public meetings and tremendous public pressure to finish the Esplanade.

City Council negotiated with the Grand Trunk Railway during the election campaign to construct the Esplanade. A primary concern was who was obligated to pay for crossings over the rail corridor, the city, or the railway. A special meeting was called on January 13, 1856, after the election but before the new City Council was sworn in to approve the contract, with the modification that the city was responsible for paying for and building any ramps or bridges over the railway tracks, instead of the Grand Trunk Railway. Despite the previous controversies, the outgoing City Council approved the contract unanimously.

== Election of the Mayor ==
After the municipal election, City Council convened on January 21, 1856, to elect a Mayor. The proceedings were well-attended, with the gallery filled with spectators eager to witness a contest between John Beverley Robinson, who represented the Family Compact and John Hutchison, supported by the city's burgeoning mercantile community.

Alderman Dunn nominated Robinson for the position of Mayor, with the motion seconded by Councilman Davis. Alderman Dunn argued in favor of Robinson. He was the most qualified candidate and the only St. Patrick's Ward nominee not represented in the mayoral office for some time. Alderman Crooks nominated John Hutchison for Mayor, challenging Robinson's competency and criticizing him for not taking an interest in Council business when he was Alderman in 1854 and for not running for Council in 1855. Crooks also accused Robinson of arranging Councilman Moodie's absence from Council for the vote.

In an attempt to influence the mayoral election, Councilman Moodie, an employee of the Grand Trunk Railway and a vocal supporter of Hutchison, was dispatched by his employer to Montreal three days before the election of the Mayor by City Council, despite his objections. Notwithstanding the controversy, Robinson was elected Mayor by a majority of 4, with the motion carried 15 to 11.

== City Council Results ==
Each ward elected 2 Aldermen and 2 Councilmen. There were ten open seats in the 1856 election, and 15 members of the City Council stood for re-election. Two incumbents lost, Angus Morrison (elected to the Provincial assembly in the summer of 1854) and William Graham.

St. James' Ward
Position	Candidate		Votes	%	±	Vote for Mayor
Aldermen	John Harrington	Elected	427	40.9%	N/A	Robinson
Aldermen	John Hutchison	Elected	346	33.1%	N/A	Hutchison
Aldermen	Hewitt	Lost	272	26.0%	N/A	N/A
Councilmen	John Wilson(X)	Elected	317	32.4%	+2.3%	Robinson
Councilmen	John Cameron	Elected	244	25.0%	N/A	Hutchison
Councilmen	Thompson	Lost	174	17.8%	N/A	N/A
Councilmen	Mitchell	Lost	158	16.2%	N/A	N/A
Councilmen	A.H. St. Germain	Lost	84	8.6%	N/A	N/A
St. Andrew's Ward
Position	Candidate		Votes	%	±	Vote for Mayor
Aldermen	John Worthington	Elected	279	41.9%	N/A	Robinson
Aldermen	R.P. Crooks (X)	Elected	205	30.8%	-4.9%	Hutchison
Aldermen	Ritchey	Lost	182	27.3%	N/A	N/A
Councilmen	Henry Prettie (X)	Elected	276	42.9%	+15.2%	Robinson
Councilmen	Henry Sproat	Elected	229	35.6%	N/A	Robinson
Councilmen	Charles Fisher	Lost	138	21.5%	+3.7%	N/A
St. John's Ward
Position	Candidate		Votes	%	±	Vote for Mayor
Aldermen	John Bugg (X)	Elected	347	52.1%	+16.3%	Hutchison
Aldermen	Richard Dempsey	Elected	319	47.9%	+15.8%	Robinson
Councilmen	Robert Moodie	Elected	336	46.8%	+12.6%	Absent
Councilmen	Joseph Rowell (X)	Elected	241	33.6%	+3.6%	Hutchison
Councilmen	Carnegie	Lost	141	19.6%	N/A	N/A
St. David's Ward
Position	Candidate		Votes	%	±	Vote for Mayor
Aldermen	William Henderson (X)	Elected	340	37.0%	-3.2%	Hutchison
Aldermen	John George Bowes	Elected	318	34.6%	N/A	Robinson
Aldermen	Brooke	Lost	261	28.4%	N/A	N/A
Councilmen	Adam Beatty (X)	Elected	328	32.8%	-10.1%	Robinson
Councilmen	John Carruthers (X)	Elected	235	23.5%	-13.8%	Hutchison
Councilmen	James Mallon	Lost	221	22.1%	N/A	N/A
Councilmen	William Ramsey	Lost	215	21.5%	N/A	N/A
St. Lawrence Ward
Position	Candidate		Votes	%	±	Vote for Mayor
Aldermen	Alexander Manning	Elected	204	39.1%	+12.0%	Hutchison
Aldermen	William Strachan	Elected	180	34.5%	N/A	Hutchison
Aldermen	D.K. Feehan	Lost	138	26.4%	N/A	N/A
Councilmen	William Davis	Elected	199	36.2%	N/A	Robinson
Councilmen	William Murphy (X)	Elected	176	32.0%	-5.7%	Robinson
Councilmen	Ernest	Lost	175	31.9%	N/A	N/A
St. George's Ward
Position	Candidate		Votes	%	±	Vote for Mayor
Aldermen	John Duggan (X)	Elected	172	42.1%	-5.5%	Hutchison
Aldermen	G.A. Philpotts(X)	Elected	122	29.8%	-5.9%	Robinson
Aldermen	Brunel	Lost	115	28.1%	N/A	N/A
Councilmen	Geo. Neeting	Elected	127	35.4%	N/A	Hutchison
Councilmen	Edward Wright (X)	Elected	131	36.5%	+5%	Absent
Councilmen	James Myers	Lost	101	28.1%	+4.4%	N/A
St. Patrick's Ward
Position	Candidate		Votes	%	±	Vote for Mayor
Aldermen	John Beverley Robinson	Elected	279	47.3%	Candidate	
Aldermen	Johnathan Dunn (X)	Elected	171	29.0%	-21.7%	Robinson
Aldermen	Adam Wilson (X)	Lost	140	23.7%	-25.6%	N/A
Councilmen	T. Shortis	Elected	231	40.4%	N/A	Robinson
Councilmen	Theophilus Earls (X)	Elected	206	36.0%	-6.9%	Robinson
Councilmen	Reeves	Lost	135	23.6%	N/A	N/A
