= 1901 Toronto municipal election =

Municipal elections were held in Toronto, Ontario, Canada, on January 7, 1901. In the mayoral election, Oliver Aiken Howland was elected, defeating Alderman Frank S. Spence as well as incumbent Mayor Ernest A. Macdonald, who came in third place, and former mayor John Shaw, who came in fourth place. In the council elections, seventeen incumbent alderman were returned and five were defeated.

Shortly after the election, Mayor Howland called off plans by the city to put into public ownership the privately owned municipal gasworks company, despite the plan having been approved in the plebiscite by a large majority.

== Toronto mayor ==
Results
Oliver Aiken Howland - 12,300
Alderman Frank S. Spence - 8,076
Ernest A. Macdonald (incumbent) - 3,354
John Shaw - 990
Charles Christopher Woodley - 224

== Board of Control ==
The Toronto Board of Control was elected by Toronto City Council from among its members. The number of Controllers was increased from three to four in the previous year, in addition to the Mayor who chairs the Board. At the first council meeting following the general election, four Conservatives were chosen. Aldermen Sheppard, Frame and Lamb were chosen on the first ballot and Aldermen Hubbard was chosen on the second, beating out Alderman Graham.

== Plebiscites ==
A plebiscite was held on putting the municipal gas plant into public ownership and operation. Despite the plebiscite passing, the new Howland administration cancelled the project.

Gasworks
For - 13,398
Against - 6,488

== City council ==
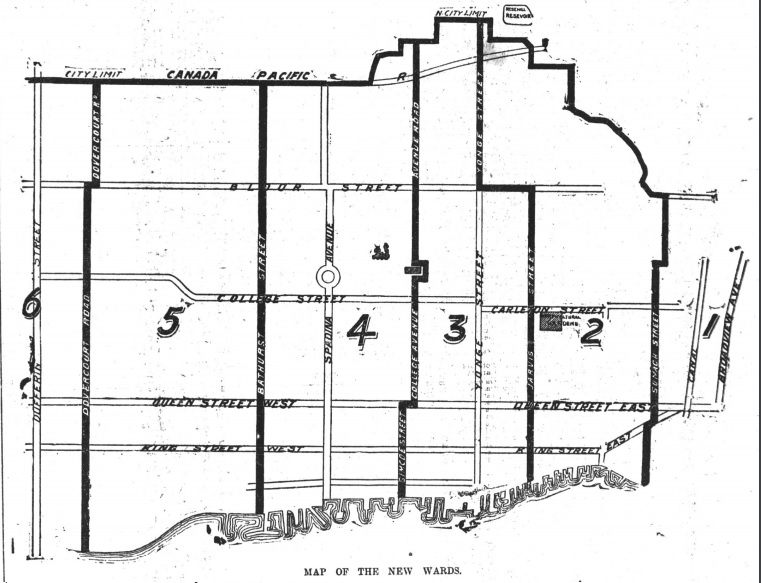
Map of Toronto's six wards (1892–1909), published in The Globe, 1 January 1892.

Four aldermen were elected to Toronto City Council per ward.

First Ward (Riverdale)
James Frame (incumbent) - 1,870
John Russell (incumbent) - 1,352
William Temple Stewart (incumbent) - 1,321
Fred H. Richardson - 1,207
John Preston - 1,077

Second Ward (Cabbagetown and Rosedale)
Thomas Foster (incumbent) - 2,947
Joseph Oliver - 2,432
Edward Strachan Cox (incumbent) - 1,824
Daniel Lamb (incumbent) - 1,742
John Akers - 1,360
Thomas W. Barber - 1,329

Third Ward (Central Business District and The Ward)
Oliver Barton Sheppard (incumbent) - 2,561
John Francis Loudon (incumbent) - 2,314
Henry Sheard - 1,922
George McMurrich (incumbent) - 1,878
Bernard Saunders (incumbent) - 1,620
John Morrison - 1,585
Joseph George Ramsden - 1,499
Samuel George Curry - 993
Thomas Hunter - 733
Robert L. Fraser - 720
Thomas W. Curtis - 286
Robert Barton - 101
James B. Tremaine - 100

Fourth Ward (Spadina)
Thomas Urquhart - 3,191
William Burns (incumbent) - 2,680
William Peyton Hubbard (incumbent) - 2,673
James Crane (incumbent) - 2,500
Alex R. Williamson - 1,688
Samuel Platt - 740

Fifth Ward (Trinity-Bellwoods)
James Russell Lovett Starr - 1,887
Dr. William Stewart Fraleigh - 1,748
William Bell (incumbent) - 1,593
Frank Woods (incumbent) - 1,571
Alexander Stewart - 1,503
A.R. Denison (incumbent) - 1,418
John Dunn (incumbent) - 1,340
David Clark - 594
J.J. Dunbar - 447
Edmund Schilling - 81

Sixth Ward (Brockton and Parkdale)
John James Graham (incumbent) - 1,758
John Joseph Ward (incumbent) - 1,562
W.W. Hodgson (incumbent) - 1,523
Dr. Adam Lynd - 1,367
J.M. Bowman - 1,318
Alexander Asher (incumbent) - 1,171
William O'Neill - 359

Source: and
