= Amy Parkinson =

Canadian poet (1855–1938)

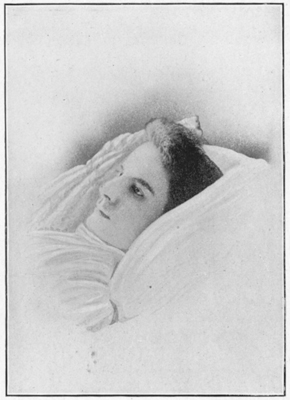
- Born: Amelia Jane Parkinson; 27 December 1855; Liverpool, England
- Died: 13 February 1938 (aged 82); Toronto, Ontario, Canada
- Other name: Amy
- Occupation: Poet
- Writing career
- Language: English
- Genre: Devotional/religious

Signature
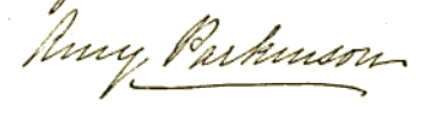

Amy Parkinson (27 December 1855 – 13 February 1938) was a British-born Canadian poet, her work being chiefly devotional. Parkinson's poems were distributed in leaflet form by her friends among the sick and the "shut-ins", having a wide ministry of comfort; it is this characteristic of her work that led to her being widely called "the Canadian Havergal". Several poetry collections were published including, Love Through All (1893), and In His Keeping.

== Early life and education ==
Amelia (nickname, "Amy") Jane Parkinson was born in Liverpool, England, on 27 December 1855. (Note: Wallace (1926) records Parkinson's year of birth as, "about 1859".) She was a daughter of Charles Pye Parkinson (1823–1910) and Lucy Anne Ireland (1830–1909). On her mother's side, she was English through a long direct line; on her father's, a few generations back, she claimed Highland Scots ancestry. She had a brother, William. Amy lived in Newport, Wales, before emigrating to Toronto, Ontario, Canada, with her parents in 1868, where she lived the rest of her life.

Parkinson's education, owing to her delicate health, was private and formally ceased after a nervous breakdown when she was 12 years of age. Her health failed completely and though physicians held out hope of recovery for a while, finally, this was abandoned. For most of her life thereafter, Parkinson remained in her bed, possibly due to epilepsy.

== Career ==
During the early years of her life, she gave little promise of poetic talent, and her parents never suspected that she had it. Apparently, her only training in verse-making was that of suffering. As she lay in her sick bed, there came to her an inspiration which resulted in the composition of a poem, entitled "A Song in the Night". This, her first effort, occurred about three months after she had taken to bed. It was followed by many other verses. She dictated her verses to her father as he knelt next to her bed. He was obliged to put his ear to her lips to catch her words, so weak was she while dictating to him. Many of her verses —her "messages," as she called them— came to her when she was in a state of almost complete physical exhaustion. Her mind was specially vigorous in composition as she passed into or recovered from the severe attacks which seized her, any one of which might have proved fatal.

Her work was almost wholly of a deeply spiritual character, marked by beauty of thought and expression.

Parkinson did not envision her poetry being shared beyond the circle of her own family, but a friend, having obtained possession of some of the manuscripts, showed them to the Rev. Dr. William Henry Withrow. His highly appreciative letter, requesting them for publication, convinced Parkinson that it was her duty to send them out. She thereafter became a regular contributor to the periodicals edited by Withrow, and to others, in the United States and Canada. Letters attesting their usefulness were received by Parkinson from others like herself, who had read them and derived great comfort from them. The idea then occurred to her that, sich as she was, God had a mission for her to discharge in endeavoring to give comfort to others. She determined to make a selection from her poems, and with appropriate passages of Scripture for each, she apportioned them among the days of one month. These formed a booklet which was restricted to private circulation. The reception of this work was so cordial that Parkinson reluctantly consented to its publication in the regular way. Unfortunately, nine-tenths of the edition was destroyed by The Globe fire of 1898, in the printing office of Brough & Caswell.

Parkinson's works appeared in periodicals, such as the Methodist Magazine, The Christian Workers Magazine, The Western Christian Advocate, and the Christian Advocate.

No complete volume of her poems was published, but a number of small collections in booklet form were issued from time to time. Parkinson's lyrics to "He Doeth All Things Well" were set to music by W. J. Hunter Emory, M.D. and published in Best (1902). Earlier, Love through all, 1893; "In his keeping", 1897; and At Yuletide, 1901, were published.

== Later life ==
Parkinson was confined to her bed for more than 60 years.

After the death of her mother (1909) and father (1910), Parkinson left the family home and resided in a "Home for Incurables" and in a "Church Home" before she died in Toronto, on 13 February 1938.

== "A Song in the Night" ==
"Rest in the Lord, and wait patiently for him."-Ps. xxxvii. 7.

Rest thou in Him—no need for fear—
Thou knowost not His plan for thee,
But well thou know'st that He is near,
Then rest in Him, rest quietly.
Not much seems left of earthly joy—
But oh, thy Father knoweth best!
Let this blesť word thy thought employ—
And rest.

Wait thou for Him-take what He sends,
Sure that His every thought for thee
In naught but love begins and ends;
Then wait for Him, ""wait patiently."
For tbee may rise-thou canst not tell—
New joys, e'en this side heaven's gate;
If not—He always chooseth well,—
Just wait.

== Selected works ==
=== Poetry books ===
- Love through all : a voice from a sick room : thoughts for each day, 1893
- "In his keeping" : words of sustaining from the source of all strength; with kindred thoughts in verse, 1897
- At Yuletide, 1901
- Best : the story of the messenger hours with some of the thoughts they have brought to Amy Parkinson., 1902

=== Poems ===
- "A Song in the Night"
- "Westward", 1893
- "Comfort", 1895
- "Compensation", 1895
- "Worship", 1895
- "The Twenty-Third Psalm", 1900
- "Enoch", 1901
- "God Shall Supply All Your Needs"
- "His Great Love""Enoch", 1901
- "A Hymn for Christmas-Day", 1902
- "Heights and Depths", 1902
- "In the Valley", 1903
- "Acquiescence", 1904
- "Anticipation", 1904
- "At Summer's Close", 1904
- "First Christmas Night", 1904
- "In Silence", 1904
- "He Will Not Suffer Thy Foot to Be Moved", 1911
- "Thanksgiving", 1918

=== Hymns ===
- "He Doeth All Things Well", 1902 (music by W. J. Hunter Emory)
