= 1889 Toronto municipal election =

Municipal elections were held in Toronto, Canada, on January 7, 1889. Edward Frederick Clarke, was re-elected to a second term as Mayor of Toronto by acclamation.

== Toronto mayor ==
Results
Edward Frederick Clarke - acclamation

== Referendum ==
A referendum was held on a by-law to fund a hospital for "dipsomaniacs" (i.e. a rehabilitation facility to treat alcoholism). The proposal was defeated.

For - 1,961
Against - 3,902

== Aldermen elected to city council ==
St. Andrew's Ward
E. King Dodds (incumbent) - 798
J. E. Verral - 763
William Carlyle (incumbent) - 732
Pells (incumbent) - 679
Britton - 381

St. David's Ward
Robert J. Fleming (incumbent) - 1,239
William H. Gibbs (incumbent) - 1,010
John C. Swait (incumbent) - 883
Gibson - 843

St. George's Ward
George E. Gillespie (incumbent) - 609
John Maugham (incumbent) - 546
George Verral (incumbent) - 543
Hall - 396

St. James' Ward
Alfred McDougall (incumbent) - 999
John McMillan (incumbent) - 963
James B. Boustead (incumbent) - 939
Steiner - 437

St. John's Ward
Joseph Tait - 693
Frank Moses - 691
A. H. Gilbert (incumbent) - 638
R. J. Score - 605
Piper (incumbent) - 464
Irwin (incumbent) - 421

St. Lawrence Ward
Charles Small - 870
Thomas Davies - 662
Garrett F. Frankland (incumbent) - 622
John Hallam (incumbent) - 598

St. Mark's Ward
John Ritchie (incumbent) - 419
Charles Frederick Denison (incumbent) - 409
Michael J. Woods (incumbent) - 403
McConnell - 224
Boyle - 112
Emerson - 104

St. Matthew's Ward
Ernest A. Macdonald - 447
Francis E. Galbraith (incumbent) - 411
Peter Macdonald (incumbent)- 389
John Knox Leslie - 365
G. S. Macdonald - 344

St. Patrick's Ward
John Baxter (incumbent) - 1,028
Miles Vokes - 998
George J. St. Leger (incumbent) - 781
Weatherton - 780
John Lucas - 362
W. J. Little - 490

St. Paul's Ward
W. J. Hill (incumbent) - acclamation
William Roaf - (incumbent) acclamation
John Shaw (incumbent) - acclamation

St. Stephen's Ward
William Bell (incumbent) - 947
J. Crocker - 937
Robert H. Graham - 925
Tyler - 293

St. Thomas' Ward
William Carlyle (incumbent) - 765
Edward Hewitt (incumbent) - 522
Thomas McMullen - 513
William Park - 444
Rundle - 304
Patton - 137

== By-election ==
In the course of 1889, Parkdale was annexed by the city of Toronto and was added to the municipal ward map as St. Alban's Ward, effective March 31, 1889. Booth, Lennox, and Gowanlock were elected as aldermen for the new ward.

St. Alban's Ward
George Booth - 499
Isaac Lennox - 433
James Gowanlock - 418
other candidates not reported
