= 1891 Toronto municipal election =

Municipal elections were held in Toronto, Canada, on January 5, 1891. Edward Frederick Clarke, was re-elected to his fourth term in office, defeating former alderman Ernest A. Macdonald.

== Toronto mayor ==
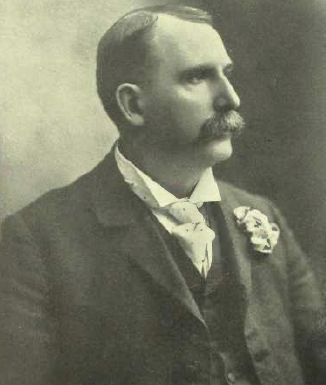
Edward Frederick Clarke

Results
Edward Frederick Clarke - 8,146
Ernest A. Macdonald - 6,953

== Aldermen elected to City Council ==
Three per ward

St. Alban's Ward
Hugh McMath - 506
William P. Atkinson - 458
James Gowanlock (incumbent) - 427
George Booth (incumbent) - 295
Edward Turry - 235

St. Andrew's Ward
William Burns 1,049
J. Kerr 817
J. E. Verral (incumbent) 810
William Carlyle (incumbent) 759

St. David's Ward
Thomas Allen (incumbent) 892
W. H. Gibbs (incumbent) 878
Thomas Foster 813
J. S. Boddy 663
Richard Wallace 596
James Walsh 497
J. A. McIllwain 120

St. George's Ward
George E. Gillespie (incumbent) 583
George McMurrich 565
George Verral (incumbent) 509
Cornelius Flanaghan 395
John Maugham (incumbent) 360

St. James' Ward
Alfred McDougall (incumbent) 970
William Middleton Hall 812
J. B. Boustead (incumbent) 791
Wallace Millichamp 689

St. John's Ward
G. M. Rose 879
R. J. Score (incumbent) 731
R. J. Stanley 634
Frank Moses (incumbent) 521

St. Lawrence Ward
Charles Small (incumbent) 952
John Hallam (incumbent) 716
James Pape 678
G. F. Frankland (incumbent) - 615

St. Mark's Ward
George Lindsey (incumbent) 778
Dr. Joseph Orlando Orr 773
John Maloney 675
John James Graham 449
Benjamin Smith 232
John Ritchie 167

St. Matthew's Ward
John Knox Leslie (incumbent) 559
Peter Macdonald (incumbent) 559
W. T. Stewart 519
G. S. Macdonald (incumbent) 503

St. Patrick's Ward
James Joliffe 1,402
John Lucas (incumbent) 1,344
Thomas Pells (incumbent) 666
W. J. Little 604

St. Paul's Ward
John Shaw (incumbent) acclaimed
Bernard Saunders (incumbent) acclaimed
W. J. Hill (incumbent) acclaimed

St. Stephen's Ward
William Bell (incumbent) 1,302
John Bailey (incumbent) 1,166
R. H. Graham (incumbent) 1,132
Stephen Wilcock 933

St. Thomas' Ward
Edward Hewitt (incumbent) 612
William Park 518
Edward Farquhar 505
Thomas McMullen (incumbent) 501
A. H. Rundle 333
