= 1890 Toronto municipal election =

Municipal elections were held in Toronto, Canada, on January 6, 1890. Edward Frederick Clarke, was re-elected to his third term in office as Mayor of Toronto, defeating Alderman John McMillan.

== Toronto mayor ==
Results
Edward Frederick Clarke - 10,419
John McMillan - 8,445

== Aldermen elected to City Council ==
Three elected per ward

The Toronto World noted that the new council was "more Conservative than ever" and that "not a single Catholic is an alderman" as both Catholic candidates, Burns in St. Andrew's Ward and Kelly in St. Lawrence, had been defeated.

St. Alban's Ward
George Booth (incumbent) - 480
James Gowanlock (incumbent) - 412
Isaac Lennox (incumbent) - 321
Sinclair - 254
William P. Atkinson - 235
Hugh McMath - 155

St. Andrew's Ward
William Carlyle (incumbent)- 878
E. King Dodds (incumbent) - 794
J. E. Verral (incumbent) - 669
William Burns- 682
Henderson - 530
Pells - 506

St. David's Ward
John C. Swait (incumbent) - 1,081
William H. Gibbs (incumbent) - 1,048
Thomas Allen - 962
Richard Wallace - 517
Price - 323
Rothwell - 261
Griffin - 154

St. George's Ward
George E. Gillespie (incumbent) acclaimed
John Maugham (incumbent) acclaimed
George Verral (incumbent) acclaimed

St. James' Ward
James B. Boustead (incumbent) - 1,166
Alfred McDougall (incumbent) - 1,093
Ernest A. Macdonald - 854
Thompson - 623
Hall - 535

Ernest A. Macdonald had previously represented St. Matthew's Ward

St. John's Ward
Frank Moses (incumbent) - 994
R. J. Score - 924
Irwin - 897
G. M. Rose - 857

St. Lawrence Ward
John Hallam (incumbent) - 889
Charles Small - 803
Garrett F. Frankland (incumbent) - 730
Thomas Davies (incumbent) - 583
Kelly - 513

St. Mark's Ward
John Ritchie (incumbent) - 517
George Lindsey - 496
Charles Frederick Denison - 390
Barrett - 362
Greyson - 283
Boyle - 163
Sparling - 150
Prittle - 147
Guthrie - 130

St. Matthew's Ward
John Knox Leslie - 562
G. S. Macdonald (incumbent) - 533
Peter Macdonald (incumbent)- 400
Elliott - 275
Graham - 238
Schoff - 182
Pickering - 47

St. Patrick's Ward
John Baxter (incumbent) - 1,755
Miles Vokes (incumbent) - 1,680
John Lucas (incumbent) 1,408
W. J. Little - 1,101
Walker - 476

St. Paul's Ward
W. J. Hill (incumbent) - 792
Bernard Saunders (incumbent) - 608
John Shaw (incumbent) - 535
Cooper - 456
Huddart - 274

St. Stephen's Ward
William Bell (incumbent) - 1,354
Robert H. Graham (incumbent) - 1,272
John Bailey (incumbent) - 786
Stephen Wilcock - 687
Hubble - 310
Tyler - 308
Brown - 223

St. Thomas' Ward
William Carlyle (incumbent) - 701
Edward Hewitt (incumbent) - 683
Thomas McMullen (incumbent) - 634
William Park - 531
Edward Farquhar - 488
