= William Pearce Howland =

Canadian Father of Confederation (1811–1907)

The Honourable Sir William Pearce Howland PC KCMG CB
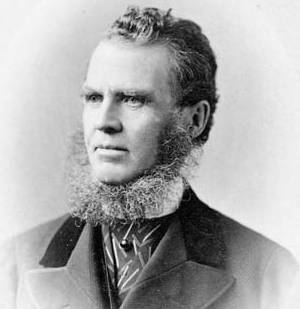

2nd Lieutenant Governor of Ontario
- In office 15 July 1868 – 11 November 1873
- Monarch: Victoria
- Governors General: The Viscount Monck; The Lord Lisgar; The Earl of Dufferin
- Premier: John Sandfield Macdonald; Edward Blake; Oliver Mowat
- Preceded by: Henry William Stisted
- Succeeded by: John Willoughby Crawford

Member of the Canadian Parliament for York West
- In office 20 September 1867 – 15 July 1868
- Succeeded by: Amos Wright

Member of the Legislative Assembly of the Province of Canada for West York
- In office 1857–1867

Personal details
- Born: 29 May 1811 Pawling, New York, US
- Died: 1 January 1907 (aged 95) Toronto, Ontario, Canada
- Resting place: St. James Cemetery, Toronto
- Party: Liberal-Conservative
- Children: William Holmes Howland; Oliver Aiken Howland
- Cabinet: Minister of Inland Revenue (1867–1868)

Sir William Pearce Howland, PC, KCMG, CB (29 May 1811 – 1 January 1907) was a Canadian politician who served as the second Lieutenant Governor of Ontario, from 1868 to 1873. As a member of the Executive Council of the Province of Canada from November 1864 to 1867, he was one of the Fathers of Confederation who attended the London Conference of 1866.

== Biography ==
Born in 1811 in Pawling, New York, William Howland was educated at Kinderhook Academy. In 1830 he settled in Cooksville, Upper Canada, and became a naturalised British subject in 1841. He operated Lambton Mills and later a grocery business in Toronto. In 1852 he acquired a grist mill, sawmill, and general store in Kleinburg, whose operations he left to his brother Henry Stark Howland. In 1857, Howland became a Member of the Legislative Assembly of the Province of Canada, and later served in the cabinet as Minister of Finance, Receiver General, and Postmaster General. He became a Member of Parliament in 1867 and was Minister of Inland Revenue from 1867 to 1868. He was created a CB in 1867. Howland was appointed Ontario's second Lieutenant Governor in 1868 and served until 1873. He was created a KCMG in 1879.

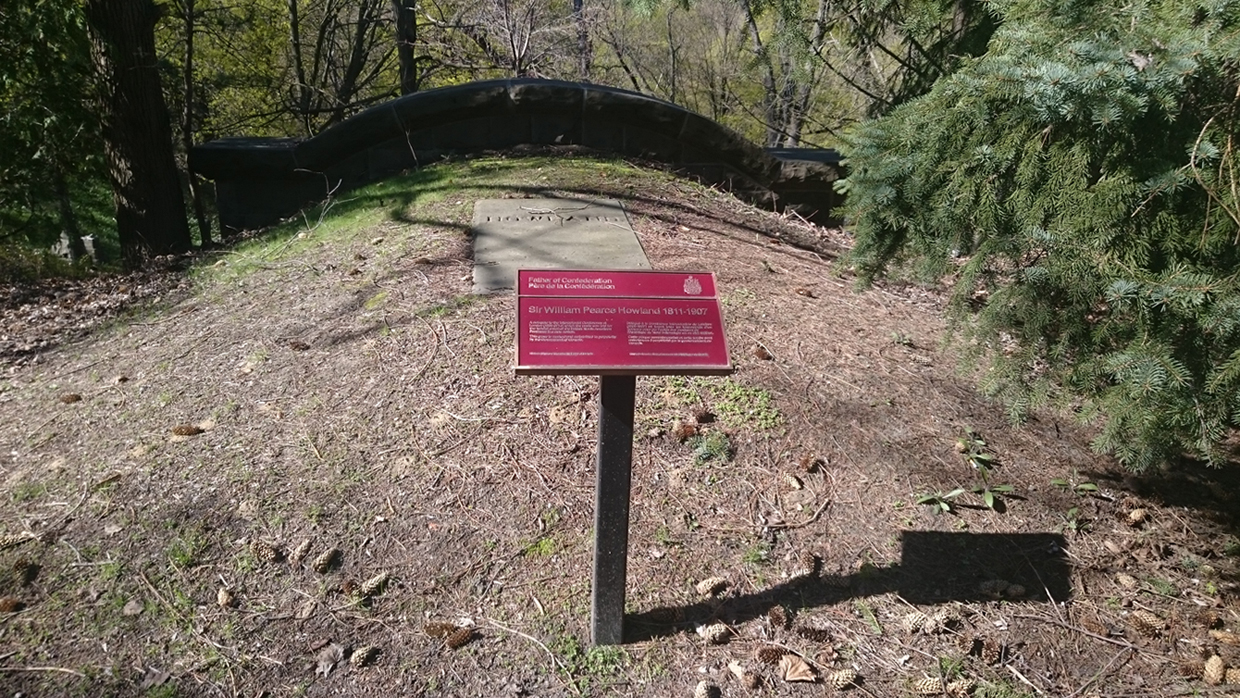
Howland's grave site at St. James Cemetery is marked with a Historic Sites and Monuments Board of Canada plaque

He was knighted in 1879 and died in Toronto in 1907. He is buried in Toronto's St. James Cemetery. Toronto in 1907. In 1906, at the request of Sir Wilfrid Laurier, Prime Minister of Canada, Howland prepared an autobiography that included extensive appendices about politics in the 1860s.

=== Personal life ===
On 12 July 1843, Sir William Pearce Howland married Mary Ann (or Marianne) Blyth, the widow of David Webb, a ship's captain. Mary Anne and William had three children: William, Oliver and Florence. Their sons, William Holmes Howland and Oliver Aiken Howland, served as mayors of Toronto. Mary died in 1860.

William Pearce Howland, then a Minister of the Crown in Canada married Susannah Julia, daughter of Shrewsbury, Esquire, on 21 November 1865. She was born in London, England, 4, 1 May 1830, and educated there. She was a widow, who had accompanied her first husband (1850) Philip Hunt, of the Military Store Department, to the Mauritius, and thence to Canada.

Mrs. Howland was presented to Queen Victoria in 1866, on the occasion of the London Conference on Confederation. In 1875, she presented her step-daughter, Miss Howland (later Mrs. R. M. Merritt) to Her Majesty. On leaving Government House, Howland was presented with an address from citizens of Toronto, and Lady Howland was given a gold bracelet, with her initials set in diamonds, and containing a locket with miniature portraits of herself and husband. Lady Howland died in Toronto, 21 February 1886, and was buried in St. James's Cemetery.

In 1895, Sir William married Mary Elizabeth Rattaway, widow of James Bethune, QC By 1904, they had separated.

His sons, William Holmes Howland and Oliver Aiken Howland, served as mayors of Toronto.

== Electoral record ==
1867 Canadian federal election: York West
Party	Candidate	Votes	%
Liberal–Conservative	William Pearce Howland	810	73.17
Unknown	H. S. Hubertus	297	26.83
Unknown	David Blain	0	0.00
Total valid votes		1,107	49.35
Eligible voters		2,243	
Source: 1867 Return of the Elections to House of Commons

Government offices
Preceded by Henry William Stisted	Lieutenant Governor of Ontario; 1868–1873	Succeeded by John Willoughby Crawford
