= 1898 Toronto municipal election =

Local politics in Toronto

Municipal elections were held in Toronto, Canada, on January 3, 1898. Mayor John Shaw was first elected mayor by Toronto City Council after his predecessor, Robert John Fleming, resigned on August 5, 1897, to accept an appointment as assessment commissioner. Shaw was returned to office in the 1898 election by defeating former alderman Ernest A. Macdonald, who was making his second attempt to be elected mayor. The main issues of both the mayoralty and aldermanic campaigns were a proposal to build the James Bay Railway from Toronto to James Bay and proposals to get hydroelectric power from Niagara Falls so that the city could have access to less expensive electricity, with Shaw favouring both proposals, along with almost all aldermen who were elected.

== Toronto mayor ==
Results
John Shaw (incumbent) - 12,602
Ernest A. Macdonald - 8,462

== Board of Control ==
The Toronto Board of Control was elected by Toronto City Council from among its members, and presided over by the mayor. At the first council meeting following the general election, council chose Aldermen Burns, Hubbard, and Leslie to sit on the body, presided over by the mayor.

== Plebiscites ==
A plebiscite was held on abolishing tax exemptions, however, the measure needed approval by the provincial government in order to be implemented.

Results
Yea - 11,331
Nay - 5,175

== Aldermen elected to City Council ==
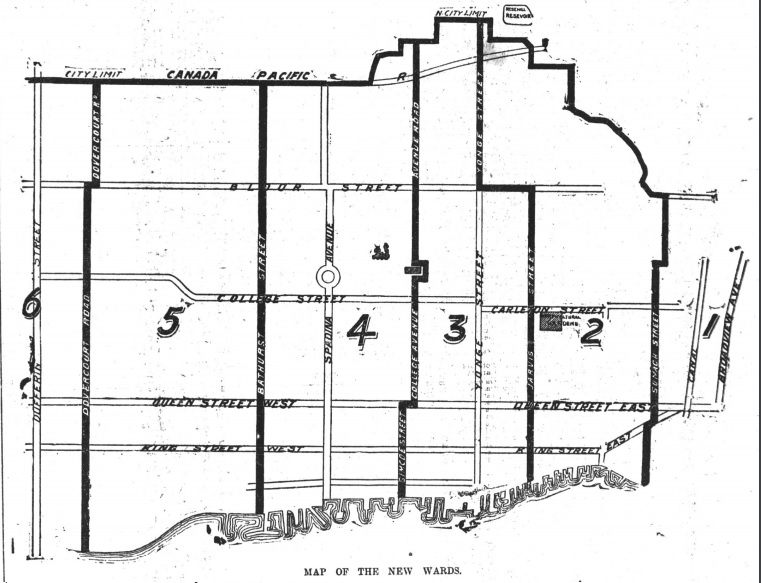
Map of Toronto's six wards (1892-1909), published in The Globe, 1 January 1892.

Four alderman were elected to sit on Toronto City Council in each of six wards. Five incumbent aldermen were defeated in the election while an additional four did not stand for re-election.

First Ward
F.A. Richardson - 1,226
James Frame (incumbent) - 1,140
Henry R. Frankland - 955
John Knox Leslie (incumbent) - 835
William T. Stewart - 724
John Russell (incumbent) - 684
Thomas Allen (incumbent) - 626
T.E. Washington - 609
Samuel H. Defries - 296
George Wellings - 263

Second Ward
T. Bryce - 1,934
Daniel Lamb (incumbent) - 1,724
Thomas Davies - 1,599
John Hallam (incumbent) - 1,490
Francis S. Spence (incumbent) - 1,365
Thomas Foster - 954
W.L. Beale (incumbent) - 929
John Watson -591
E.W.D. Butler - 342
James O'Hara - 125
George Duffy - 85

Third Ward
George McMurrich - 2,303
Bernard Saunders (incumbent) - 2,300
O.B. Sheppard (incumbent) - 2,141
Richard John Score - 1,598
J.B. Boustead - 1,402
A.F. Webster - 1,334
James Allison - 1,263
W.E. Raney - 1,170
Frank Moses - 691
Arthur Bollard - 615
John Damp -508
Richard Reynolds - 270

Fourth Ward
Wm. Burns (incumbent) - 2,226
Wm. P. Hubbard (incumbent) - 2,161
James Crane (incumbent) - 1,888
Edward Hanlan - 1,595
H.E. Trent - 1,300
Thomas Urquhart - 1,264
William Carlyle (incumbent) - 1,093
James Jolliffe - 838
W.G McWilliams -835
Robert P. Hall - 323
George McKibbon - 279

Fifth Ward
Francis H. Woods (incumbent) - 1,903
John Dunn (incumbent) - 1,885
Robt. H. Graham (incumbent) - 1,506
A.R. Denison - 1,425
Dr. William Stewart Fraleigh - 1,350
J.E. Verral - 980
Robert Hay - 694
W.W. Farley - 450
George Evans - 188
C.A. Muerrle - 171

Sixth Ward
James M. Bowman - 1,057
James Gowanlock (incumbent) - 1,029
Adam Lynd M.D. (incumbent) - 761
John J. Graham (incumbent) - 731
J. Harvey Hall - 709
Hugh MacMath - 644
Sturgeon Stewart - 609
Alex Asher - 599
Joseph Pocock - 406
C.F. Denison - 337
John Brown - 309
George Gilbert Rowe - 252
Robert Buist Noble - 194
George Gordon Miles - 18

Source: and
