= Andrew Taylor McCord =

Irish-Canadian public servant and philanthropist

Andrew Taylor McCord (July 12, 1805 — September 5, 1881) was an Irish Canadian public servant and philanthropist.

Born and raised in Belfast, he was educated at the Royal Belfast Academical Institution prior to emigrating to Upper Canada with his family, at the age of 26. He opened a dry goods store in York, Upper Canada (present-day Toronto) but then moved to Dundas, Ontario before returning in 1834 where he was appointed tax collector for St. Patrick's Ward. McCord was nominated to be city chamberlain (i.e. treasurer) and held the position for forty years, remaining neutral between the Reform and Tories.

By the mid-1850s, McCord was the second highest paid city official after the mayor and was in charge of overseeing all city property and the city's credit for capital ventures. Forced out of office in the 1870s due to controversies in his department, he ran for mayor in the 1875 Toronto municipal election with the support of the Reform movement and The Globe, he placed second against incumbent Francis Henry Medcalf.
