= James Lindala =

Finnish-Canadian socialist

James Lindala (May 11, 1860 — March 23, 1917) was a Finnish-Canadian socialist and was the first Finnish settler in Toronto. He became leader of the Finnish community in Canada and in 1907, he ran for Mayor of Toronto and came in second place.

== Early life and migration ==
Lindala was born in the village of Vähäkyrö, Grand Duchy of Finland in 1860 and apprenticed as a tailor in Vaasa. He emigrated to Canada in 1887, part of a wave of emigration to North America in response to economic uncertainty and Russification efforts by the Russian Empire, which ruled Finland. He was the first Finn to settle in Toronto and wrote back to Finland encouraging other tailors to emigrate to the city, as a result tens of them settled in the Queen and Spadina area by the turn of the century.

== Career ==
In 1902, Lindala established a tailoring co-operative Iso Paja (the Big Shop), on Peter Street which became the nucleus for 50 Finnish tailors and the Journeymen Tailors Union. Lindala also owned a community sauna and travel agency, and his wife ran a grocery store specialising in Finnish products. In 1902, he established the Finnish Society of Toronto and in 1907 financed the purchase of the first Finnish community centre at 214 Adelaide Street West.

The Finnish Society was active in the Socialist Party of Canada and Lindala was nominated as the party's mayoral candidate in the 1907 Toronto municipal election. Lindala ran on a platform of abolishing wage slavery and advocting collective ownership of lands and machinery. Lindala won 8,286 votes, placing second against incumbent mayor Emerson Coatsworth, who won 13,698 votes. The strong result by Lindala caused a stir in the press with The Globe wondering how "an unknown Socialist tailor of foreign birth should poll over eight thousand votes. . . against a barrister of irreproachable character." He ran again in the 1909 election coming in third with 1,735 votes.

== Death ==
Lindala died of stomach cancer in 1917 and was buried in Mount Pleasant Cemetery.
