= Traders Bank of Canada =

Canadian bank (1885–1912)

- Industry: Banking
- Founded: 19 April 1884
- Defunct: 3 September 1912
- Fate: Acquired by the Royal Bank of Canada
- Headquarters: Traders Bank Building, Toronto, Ontario

The Traders Bank of Canada was a Canadian bank that existed from 1885 to 1912. The bank was headquartered in Toronto.

The bank was created by Dominion statute on 19 April 1884 through the Act to incorporate the Traders' Bank of Canada. The sponsons of incorporation were Edmund G. Burk, John Carveth, Frederick Cubitt, James B. Fairbairn, Aaron Buckler, John J. Tilley, Robert Russell Loscombe, Alexander H. Leith, John Milne, and John Rankin.

In 1912, the Traders was acquired by the Royal Bank of Canada.
