= George Gurnett =

Upper Canadian politician, journalist, and mayor of Toronto (1792–1861)

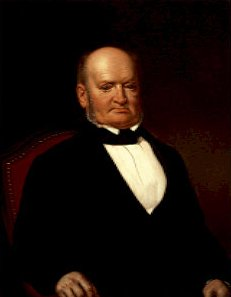

4th Mayor of Toronto
- In office 1837–1838
- Preceded by: Thomas David Morrison
- Succeeded by: John Powell
- In office 1848–1850
- Preceded by: William Henry Boulton
- Succeeded by: John George Bowes

Personal details
- Born: c.1792 Horsham or Lewes, Sussex, England
- Died: November 17, 1861 Toronto, Canada West

George Gurnett (c. 1792 – November 17, 1861) was a Canadian journalist and city of Toronto politician. He was also a member of the Orange Order in Canada.

Born in Sussex, England, he emigrated in the 1820s to Virginia. Gurnett later moved to Ancaster in Upper Canada, where he founded his first local paper, The Gore Gazette, and finally to York in 1829, where he founded the Tory paper The Courier of Upper Canada. He sold The Courier in 1837.

When York was incorporated in May 1834 as the city of Toronto, Gurnett was elected to the city council as the representative for St. George's Ward. During his 17 years on the city council he served as mayor four times, in 1837, 1848, 1849, and 1850. Due to his long service on council and his years as mayor he is often considered to be one of the founders of the city of Toronto.

Gurnett held many positions while on council. In 1837 he was appointed as the city's first Tory mayor, as magistrate of the Home District, and district clerk of the peace. He held positions on committees that dealt with the harbour and wharves, gas and waterworks, and education. He was chairman of the board of health during the 1847 typhus epidemic

Gurnett resigned from the city council at the end of 1850, after having been appointed the first police magistrate of Toronto. He served in this post until his death in 1861.

Gurnett's first wife died in 1835. In 1841 he married Catherine Darby of Trafalgar. He had eight children, six of whom died in infancy.

== Bibliography ==
- Biography at the Dictionary of Canadian Biography Online
