= Patrick G. Close =

Patrick G. Close (November 19, 1837 — July 25, 1900) was an Irish-Canadian politician, merchant, land developer, and magistrate. Close was born in Portglenone, County Antrim, Ireland and immigrated to Canada in 1862 after apprenticing in the wholesale grocery business in Belfast. His father had been a pioneer of the Irish linen industry.

In Canada, Close established a grocery business which he retired from in 1880 when he entered real estate as a land speculator and developer. In the 1890s, he managed the Bedford Park Land Company which developed North Toronto in the 1890s. He was also a major real estate developer in Parkdale, which was initially a village and suburb of Toronto prior to being annexed by the city in 1889 He was elected to Toronto City Council and sat on the body from 1873 to 1878 and again in 1880 representing St. Lawrence Ward. Close was also a founding and long-time member of the Toronto Industrial Exhibition (now known as the Canadian National Exhibition), from its inception in 1879 until his death in 1900. He was acting mayor and chief magistrate in 1877 during the absence of Mayor Angus Morrison.

Close ran for Mayor of Toronto in 1879 and 1881, losing by 600 votes and 1,200 votes, respectively. He died in 1900 of blood poisoning resulting from an insect bite. Close Avenue in Parkdale is named after him. He is buried in Mount Pleasant Cemetery, Toronto.
