= William Holmes Howland =

Canadian politician; 25th Mayor of Toronto (1844–1893)

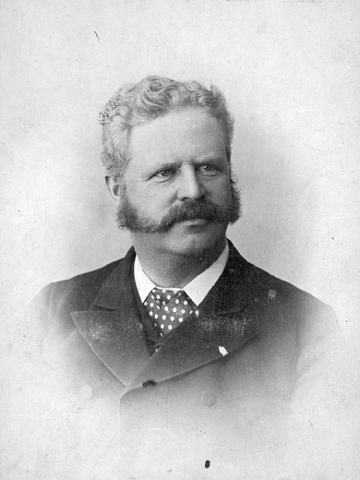

25th Mayor of Toronto
- In office 1886–1887
- Preceded by: Alexander Manning
- Succeeded by: Edward Frederick Clarke

Personal details
- Born: June 11, 1844 Lambton Mills, Upper Canada
- Died: December 12, 1893 (aged 49) Toronto, Ontario
- Resting place: Toronto Necropolis
- Spouse: Laura Edith Chipman (m. 1872)
- Relations: 6 children
- Education: Upper Canada College
- Occupation: Businessman

William Holmes Howland (11 June 1844 – 12 December 1893) was Mayor of Toronto from 1886 to 1887. He was also a member of the Orange Order in Canada.

== Biography ==
Prior to William Holmes Howland becoming Toronto's 25th mayor, he was a businessman who was elected president of the Board of Trade in 1874-1875. He was involved in many causes like the Toronto General Hospital, the Toronto Bible Training School, the Christian Missionary Union, the Mimico Industrial School for Boys and he was interested in improving the living conditions of the slum areas of the city.

He turned to municipal politics to try to help the city with problems like drunkenness, slum conditions, filthy streets and to clean up the foul water supply.

In 1884 the Ontario legislature changed voting laws to allow women to vote in city elections. Unmarried women and widows of voting age that owned or rented property assessed at over $400 were allowed to vote. After this, mayoralty races went after these newly-enfranchised people. Howland, at the time only 42 years old, ran for mayor on a platform of morality, religion and reform, with the support of the Municipal Reform Association. He was elected by a margin of 1900 votes over his nearest contender. His campaign coined the motto "Toronto the Good" for the city.

During Howland's first term he had much controversy. He was removed as mayor after personal finance problems made him transfer his assets to his wife. After that he didn't have the property qualifications to be mayor. Another election was called and he went back to the nomination meeting after he had transferred his assets back to himself. There were no other candidates so he was again confirmed as mayor.

Many problems arose when he came back as Mayor. Senior officials were arrested for misuse of funds after a coal-supply scandal broke out and a street railway strike that was backed by Howland had the militia brought in after three days of rioting. His attempt to restrict liquor licences was also defeated by council.

One of Howland's achievements was the appointment of an Inspector to the police department to fight vice and prostitution.

During his second term, council's time was occupied with projects like the Don Improvement Scheme, construction of a new city hall and court house (to replace both old city hall and Adelaide Street Court House), waterworks improvements and street paving. He was finally able to have the number of liquor licences issued by council reduced from 223 to 150 after the passing of the "Fleming Bylaw".

He didn't seek re-election and left politics. He spent the rest of his life trying to sort out his personal business affairs that suffered during his mayoralty. He died at the age of 49 from an acute case of pneumonia.

Howland's father was Sir William Pearce Howland, the only American born Father of Confederation, while brother Oliver Aiken Howland was Toronto Mayor from 1901 to 1902.
