= Alexander Mortimer Smith =

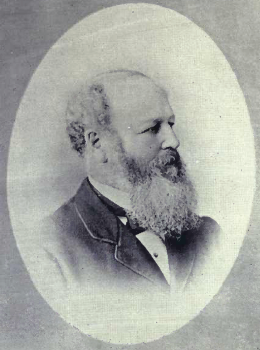

Member of the Legislative Assembly of the Province of Canada for East Toronto
- In office 1863–1866
- Preceded by: John Willoughby Crawford
- Succeeded by: Institution abolished

Personal details
- Born: May 8, 1818 Monymusk, Scotland
- Died: January 19, 1895 (aged 76) Toronto, Ontario
- Party: Reform Party

Alexander Mortimer Smith (May 8, 1818 – January 19, 1895) was a Scottish-born Canadian businessman, soldier and politician who was a member of the Legislative Assembly of the Province of Canada from 1863 to 1866. He was president of the Royal Canadian Bank.

== Life ==
He was born in Monymusk in Aberdeenshire, Scotland in 1818 and joined the ranks of the 93rd Regiment of Foot, a regular regiment of the British Army in 1836. In 1838, his regiment was sent to Toronto in Upper Canada. In 1840, Smith left the army and was employed by a local merchant, later opening his own store. In the late 1850s, he entered the wholesale trade in groceries and also the lumber trade.

He served on city council; in 1856, he was given command of a rifle company in the local militia. He joined the Toronto Board of Trade, serving as president in 1877. In 1863, he was elected to the Legislative Assembly for the riding of East Toronto. He also served as president of the Royal Canadian Bank. He retired from politics in 1867. He continued to be involved in the wholesale business in Toronto and his company operated ships transporting goods on the Great Lakes.

He died in Toronto in 1895.
