= William Henry Withrow =

Canadian Methodist minister, journalist, and author

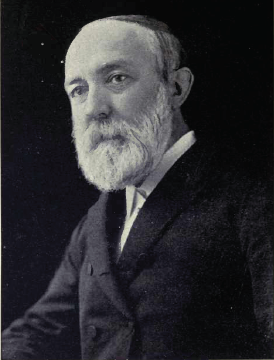
- Born: August 6, 1839; Toronto, Upper Canada
- Died: November 12, 1908 (aged 69); Toronto, Ontario, Canada
- Occupation(s): Methodist minister, journalist, author

William Henry Withrow (August 6, 1839 – November 12, 1908) was a Canadian Methodist minister, journalist, and author.

Born in Toronto, Upper Canada, Withrow received his education at Toronto Academy, Victoria College, Cobourg, and University of Toronto, graduating from the latter with the degree of B.A. in 1863. Previous to entering college, he spent three years in the office of architect William Hay of Toronto. He was ordained at Hamilton in 1864, and served the church at Waterford, Montreal, Hamilton, Toronto, Niagara, and Hamilton a second time. He was originally connected with the New Connexion Methodist body, but joined the Wesleyan Conference in 1867, and was an ardent advocate of union. In 1874 he became editor of the Canadian Methodist Magazine and Sunday School periodicals, retaining that role until 1906.

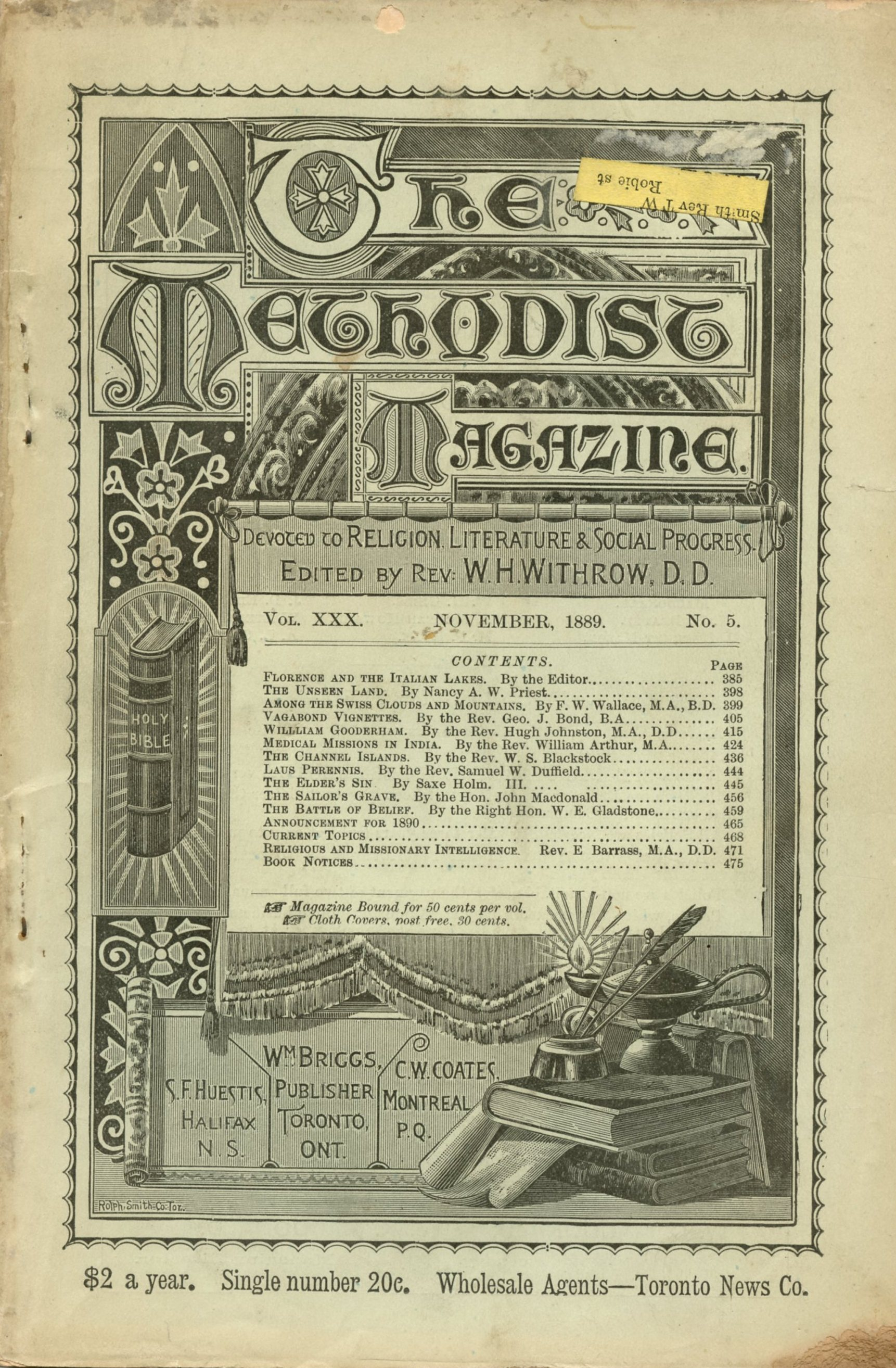
The Methodist Magazine which Withrow edited for many years

Withrow was the author of The catacombs of Rome and their testimony relative to primitive Christianity (1874), History of the Dominion of Canada and Our Own Country: Picturesque and Descriptive. He is also author of a number of smaller volumes, among which are Valeria, the Martyr of the Catacombs : A Tale of Early Christian Life in Rome, Neville Trueman, the Pioneer Preacher, The King's Messenger, and The Romance of Missions.

Withrow was elected a Fellow of the Royal Society of Canada in 1883. He was a member of the Historical Society, Montreal, of the Senate and Board of Regents of Victoria University, of the Senate of Wesleyan Theological College, Montreal, and was a member of the Senate of University of Toronto. He was married in 1864 to Sarah Anne Smith from Simcoe, Ontario. They had two sons.
