= James Edward Smith (politician) =

Canadian businessman and politician (1831–1892)

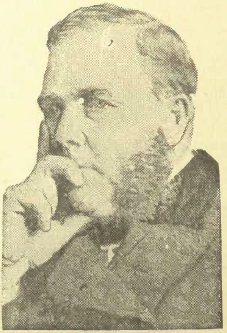

17th Mayor of Toronto
- In office 1867–1869
- Preceded by: Francis Henry Medcalf
- Succeeded by: Samuel Bickerton Harman

Personal details
- Born: December 25, 1831 London, England
- Died: March 9, 1892 (aged 60) Toronto, Canada
- Children: 1
- Occupation: Businessman

James Edward Smith (December 25, 1831 – March 9, 1892) was a Canadian businessman and politician who served as the mayor of Toronto. He was born in London, England, and moved to Toronto, Canada, as a child. He operated a grocery business and was involved in real estate and insurance. He was elected to the Toronto City Council in 1857, and the council elected Smith as the city's mayor in 1867. He oversaw the Canadian Confederation celebrations and was reelected in 1868. He did not want to be considered for a third term, but remained on the council until 1870. He continued operating his businesses and was a collector of customs at the port of Toronto until a scandal precipitated his retirement in 1879. He died in Toronto on March 9, 1892.

== Early life and business career ==
James Edward Smith was born in London, England, and Smith's family moved to Toronto, Canada, in 1841. He studied law in Henry Sherwood's law office, but did not complete his education. In the late 1850s he ran a grocer near Toronto. The grocer moved to downtown Toronto by 1861, and was called James E. Smith & Co. The business was profitable by importing grocery items and alcoholic beverages. Smith invested the money from the business into real estate. He was also a manager of the British Empire Life Insurance Company.

== Political career ==
Smith was elected to the Toronto City Council in 1857 for the St. John's ward as a councillor and was reelected to the position the following year. In 1859 he was elected as an alderman. In the early 1860s he was elected to the city's finance and assessments committee. In 1867, the city switched back to having the city council appoint a mayor instead of electing the position by popular vote. The city council rejected six nominations and reporters suggested that Smith was withholding his name until all other viable contenders for the mayoralty were defeated and had successfully lobbied to obtain the requisite number of votes for his candidacy before he was nominated, thus ensuring his success. Smith was successful upon being nominated and won by one vote.

His mayoralty was considered a success, overseeing economic prosperity in the city. He was the presiding officer of the city's celebrations for Canadian Confederation in 1867. He was reelected to the mayoralty in 1868. In November 1868 he was appointed as the collector of customs at the port of Toronto and stated that he would refuse consideration to be mayor the following year. He returned to the council as an alderman instead, remaining in the position until 1870.

== Post-political career ==
When his son joined Smith to help run his business, Smith's company was renamed J. E. and A. W. Smith. Smith remained as the collector of customs until 1879, when he resigned after a public controversy. He transferred most of the responsibilities for his business to his son, though continued to become wealthy from the growth of insurance investments in the late 1800s. He died in Toronto on March 9, 1892.
