= Samuel Bickerton Harman =

Canadian politician (1819–1892)

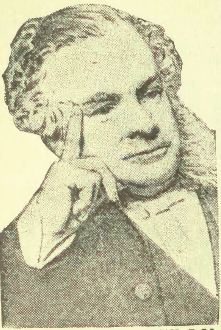

18th Mayor of Toronto
- In office 1869–1870
- Preceded by: James Edward Smith
- Succeeded by: Joseph Sheard

Personal details
- Born: December 20, 1819 Brompton, London, England
- Died: March 26, 1892 (aged 72) Toronto, Ontario
- Spouse: Georgiana Huson
- Children: six sons two daughters
- Education: King's College School; Trinity College, Toronto
- Profession: Lawyer, accountant, politician, civil servant

Samuel Bickerton Harman (20 December 1819 – 26 March 1892) was a Canadian lawyer, accountant, politician, civil servant, and Mayor of Toronto from 1869 to 1870.

== Early life ==
Harman was born in Brompton, London, England, to Samuel Harman, West Indian planter and office holder, and Dorothy Bruce Murray. After graduating from King's College School in London, he became a clerk with the Colonial Bank at its Barbados branch in 1840, and in 1843 became accountant and later manager of its Grenada branch. He married Georgiana Huson, the daughter of a Barbadian planter, in Toronto in 1842.

He returned to England in 1847 and moved to Upper Canada the following year in order to tend to some investments of his wife's family. By the early 1850s, he was reading law, and was called to the bar in 1855. He would serve as a bencher of the Law Society of Upper Canada from 1869 to 1871.

Harman was involved in many significant activities concerning Toronto's upper class:

- member of the first synod of the Anglican Diocese of Toronto in 1853, eventually being appointed as its treasurer and then as its registrar;
- helping to form the Toronto Boat Club (the predecessor of the Royal Canadian Yacht Club) in 1852;
- serving on the executive of the Saint George's Society, eventually becoming its president in 1860;
- being a master freemason from 1842, and instrumental in introducing the Knights Templar into Toronto in 1854 (in which he would act as a senior officer until 1882).
- he was also a member of the Orange Order in Canada.

When the Institute of Accountants and Adjusters of Ontario failed to secure an Act of incorporation from the Legislative Assembly of Ontario, Harman was named as its president. His political skills and stage-managing of the Toronto business élite enabled its incorporation as the Institute of Chartered Accountants of Ontario in 1883.

== Political career ==
Harman held many elected and appointed positions with the City of Toronto:

- alderman for St Andrew's Ward (1866–1868, 1871–1872)
- Mayor of Toronto (1869–1870)
- assessment commissioner (1872–1874)
- city treasurer (1874–1888)
