= John Hutchison (Canadian politician) =

Canadian businessman and politician

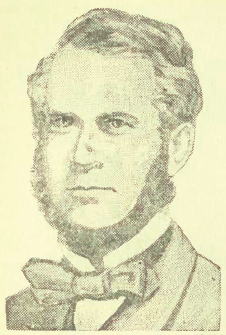

13th Mayor of Toronto
- In office 1857–1857
- Preceded by: John Beverley Robinson
- Succeeded by: William Henry Boulton

Personal details
- Born: 1817 Port Patrick, Wigtownshire, Scotland
- Died: July 7, 1863 (aged 45–46) Métis-sur-Mer, Quebec

John Hutchison (1817 – July 7, 1863) was a Canadian businessman, politician, and mayor of Toronto in 1857. He was born in Scotland and immigrated to Montreal in 1828. He moved to Toronto in 1847 and opened a merchant business. He was also a director on various Toronto public works projects. He was elected as an alderman to Toronto City Council in 1852, but resigned when the council refused to censure the city's mayor. He was again elected to the council in 1856 and was elected the city's mayor the following year. Hutchison's mayoralty occurred during an economic recession and his term was characterized by withdrawing funding from railway projects. The recession caused his business to become bankrupt and he did not run for a council seat upon the end of his mayoral term. Sources differ on when and where Hutchison died; one source says he died in Toronto a few years after becoming mayor, while an obituary states that he returned to Montreal when his term ended and died in Quebec in 1863.

== Early life and business career ==
Hutchison was born in 1817 in Port Patrick, Scotland, and immigrated to Montreal in 1828. While in Montreal he worked for Torrance and Company. He moved to Toronto in 1847 and opened a commission merchant business called Hutchison, Black and Co., which relied on his business connections in Montreal to conduct sales. He invested in and became a director of the Toronto and Sarnia Railroad, a director of the Metropolitan Gas and Water Company and of the Metropolitan Building Company. He was also the secretary-general of the Toronto Curling Club. He also ran a grocer business in Toronto and was the landlord of real estate in the city.

== Political career ==
Hutchison was an alderman for St. James ward from 1852 to 1853. During this term, he criticised the mayor, John George Bowes, for the latter's involvement in a scandal called the Ten Thousand Pound Job. When the council refused to censure Bowes, Hutchison resigned in protest.

Hutchison was again elected as the councilor for St. James ward in 1856 and was chosen to chair the council's finance and assessments committee and the committee to investigate the salaries and job responsibilities of city officials. He was praised for managing the city's funds effectively. He believed other members of the council needed to spend less of the city's funds when conducting business related to their work, and sought to reduce the city's tax levels.

He was re-elected as an alderman in 1857, and was chosen as mayor of Toronto by one vote. Hutchison's mayoralty was dominated by managing many public work projects that began in the early 1850s and an economic depression that affected the Province of Canada. The council withdrew their subsidization of many railway projects. He also signed Toronto's bid to become the province's capital city. He was politically aligned with the Conservative Party.

The economic depression caused Hutchison's business to lose a large amount of money in the fall of 1857. He submitted his resignation as mayor, but councillors convinced him to remain in the role until the end of his term.

== Later life and death ==
Sources differ on Hutchison's death. John Ross Robertson stated in 1914 that Hutchison died in Toronto two or three years after his mayoralty ended. Victor Russell stated in 1982 that upon leaving the council, Hutchison closed his Toronto business and moved back to Montreal, retired to Metis, Quebec due to declining health, and died there in 1863. Russell supports his information with an obituary published in The Globe, a Toronto newspaper.
