= Joshua George Beard =

Upper Canada politician and businessman (1797–1866)

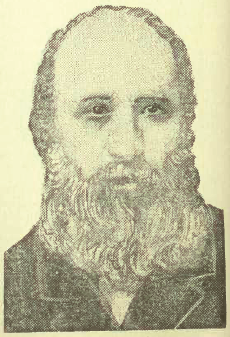

10th Mayor of Toronto
- In office 1854–1854
- Preceded by: John George Bowes
- Succeeded by: George William Allan

Personal details
- Born: 1797 England
- Died: November 9, 1866 (aged 68–69) Toronto, Canada West

Joshua George Beard (1797 – November 9, 1866) was an Upper Canadian businessman, politician, and mayor of Toronto in 1854. He was born in England and immigrated to York, Upper Canada. He opened various businesses in the York area and owned real estate throughout the province. He was also a municipal official and politician for York, and was elected to the Toronto city council and Toronto School Board of Trustees. In 1854 he was elected by his city council peers to be mayor of Toronto. Although he was ill in the first few months of his mayoralty, he recovered and resumed his duties, avoiding scandal that had affected the previous council. His poor health caused him to limit his political activity in 1864 and he resigned from all his political positions by 1865. He also retired from running his businesses, allowing his sons to assume responsibility.

== Early life and business ==
Beard was born in England, and immigrated to York, Upper Canada. He became a merchant, opening a business called J.G. Beard and Sons. The business included an iron foundry, operating a wharf and selling coal and wood. He also bought real estate throughout the province, which caused him to become one of the largest property owners in the city. He owned property included land in Clarke township and an interest in Beard's Hotel in York.

== Political life ==
Beard was involved in municipal politics, serving as the sheriff's clerk and secretary for the town of York. The town was incorporated as the city of Toronto in 1834, and Beard was elected to the first Toronto City Council in a by-election for the ward of St. Lawrence. He ran as a Conservative candidate and was aligned with Conservative values. By 1844, Conservatives were divided between the aging Family Compact members, who were considered the political elite, and the working class. Beard was a mediator between these groups and was dubbed a member of the "Corporation Beauties" by The Globe, a Reformers aligned Toronto newspaper. He continued representing the ward of St. Lawrence as an alderman until 1854, with the exception of five years between 1848 and 1853. In 1854, he was unanimously chosen by the other aldermen on Toronto City Council to become mayor of the city.

Beard entered the mayoralty after a major scandal, the Ten Thousand Pound Job, disrupted the reputation of the aldermen and the city's financial capabilities. However, Beard became ill in January 1854 and John Beverly Robinson assumed most of his duties while Beard recovered. Beard returned to his mayoral duties in April and the council proceeded with municipal affairs without major scandals. He oversaw the removal of structures built to house cholera patients.

Upon the establishment of the Toronto School Board of Trustees in 1850, Beard was elected as a trustee to represent the ward of St. Lawrence. In 1852 he became chairman of the board and remained in that role until 1864, when he retired citing poor health. While a trustee, he supported free education supported by municipal taxes. He was also a constant advocate for the board's accomplishments to build support for free education.

== Post-political life ==
Beard did not seek reelection for Toronto City Council in 1865 and left the Toronto School Board because of his ill health. His three sons, who were working in his business, took over the business upon his retirement. He died on November 9, 1866.
