= Oliver Aiken Howland =

Canadian politician (1847–1905)

Oliver Howland
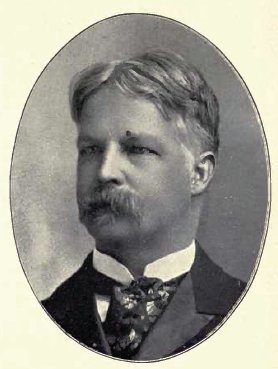

31st Mayor of Toronto
- In office 1901–1902
- Preceded by: Ernest A. Macdonald
- Succeeded by: Thomas Urquhart

Ontario MPP
- In office 1894–1898
- Preceded by: Riding established
- Succeeded by: James Joseph Foy
- Constituency: Toronto South

Personal details
- Born: April 18, 1847 Lambton Mills, Canada West (Etobicoke)
- Died: March 9, 1905 (aged 57) Toronto
- Party: Conservative
- Relations: William Holmes Howland, brother
- Education: University of Toronto
- Profession: Lawyer

Oliver Aiken Howland, CMG KC (April 18, 1847 – March 9, 1905) was a Toronto lawyer and a political figure in both Toronto city politics and at the provincial level. He represented Toronto South in the Legislative Assembly of Ontario from 1894 to 1898 and was mayor of Toronto from 1901 to 1902.

He was born in Lambton Mills, Canada West (later Etobicoke) in 1847, the son of Sir William Pearce Howland, and was educated at Upper Canada College and the University of Toronto. He studied law with Matthew Crooks Cameron, was called to the bar in 1875 and set up practice in Toronto. Howland was later named King's Counsel. He was a vice-president of the Canadian Bar Association and served on the council of the Canadian Institute from 1894 to 1895.

He authored several books: The Irish problem as viewed by a citizen of the Empire (1887); The New Empire - reflections upon its origin and constitution and its relation to the great republic (1891), in which he reprinted views he had previously presented in columns in the Toronto Week. He also was an advocate of electoral reform calling for proportional representation. Shortly after his mayoralty, Toronto began to use cumulative voting to elect the board of control.

He was first elected as an MPP in 1894 and to the mayor's chair in Toronto in 1901.

Howland was president of the Internal Deep Waterways Association and chairman of the Canadian branch of the International Commission on Deep Water Ways. He was also a director of Bishop Ridley College. He was also a member of the Orange Order in Canada.

Howland was appointed a Companion of the Order of St Michael and St George (CMG) during the visit to Toronto of the Duke and Duchess of Cornwall and York (later King George V and Queen Mary) in October 1901.

His older brother William Holmes Howland also served as 25th Mayor of Toronto a decade and a half earlier.
