= William Barclay McMurrich =

Canadian politician

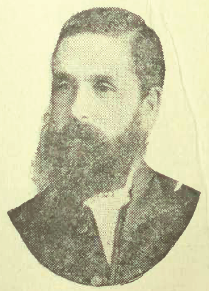

23rd Mayor of Toronto
- In office 1881–1882
- Preceded by: James Beaty Jr.
- Succeeded by: Arthur Radcliffe Boswell

Personal details
- Born: November 1, 1842 Toronto, Canada West
- Died: September 6, 1908 (aged 65) Toronto, Ontario, Canada
- Resting place: Mount Pleasant Cemetery
- Relations: John McMurrich, father J. Playfair McMurrich, brother
- Education: University of Toronto
- Profession: Lawyer

William Barclay McMurrich (November 1, 1842 – September 6, 1908) was a Canadian lawyer and politician. He was the mayor of Toronto from 1881 to 1882. He was also a member of the Orange Order in Canada.

Born in Toronto, the son of John McMurrich and Janet Dixon, McMurrich was educated at Knox Academy and Upper Canada College. He received a Bachelor of Arts degree in 1863 and a Master of Arts degree in 1864 from the University of Toronto. He then studied law and was called to the Bar in 1866. He was a practising lawyer.

In 1868, he was elected a public school trustee for the St. Andrew's ward and served in this position for eight years. In 1879, he was elected to the Toronto City Council for the St. Patrick's Ward. In 1881, he was elected mayor of Toronto and re-elected in 1882. He did not run in 1883 instead was a candidate for the House of Commons of Canada in the riding of West Toronto in the 1882 federal election. He lost to James Beaty Jr.

He died while at a cottage on Lake Joseph in 1908 and was buried in Mount Pleasant Cemetery.

McMurrich's younger brother, George McMurrich, was a long-time alderman on Toronto City Council.
