= Joseph Sheard =

Architect and politician (1813–1883)

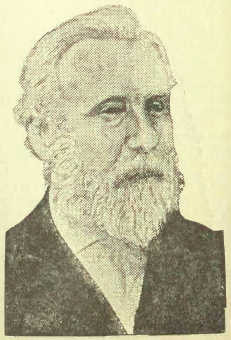

19th Mayor of Toronto
- In office 1871–1872
- Preceded by: Samuel Bickerton Harman
- Succeeded by: Alexander Manning

Personal details
- Born: 11 October 1813 Hornsea, near Hull, Yorkshire, England
- Died: 30 August 1883 (aged 69) Toronto, York County, Ontario, Canada
- Resting place: St. James Cemetery, Toronto, York County, Ontario, Canada
- Spouse: Sarah Elizabeth Tuke
- Children: Mary, Matthew, Joseph, George, Thomas, Henry and Charles S.
- Occupation: Architect, Mayor of York (previous to being named or familiarized as Toronto)

Joseph Sheard (11 October 1813 – 30 August 1883) was an English architect and politician. He was Mayor of Toronto from 1871 to 1872.

Born in Hornsea, near Hull, Yorkshire, England, his father died when he was only six weeks old, leaving four young children to be raised by his mother. He quit school at the age of 9 and found a job as an apprentice with a barrel-maker.

Aged 19, he sailed from Hull on 15 April 1833 aboard the "Foster" landing in Quebec. He made his way by Durham boat to Prescott, Upper Canada where he boarded the steamboat "William the Fourth" for York, arriving in Toronto in 1833.

He first was a carpenter, builder, and then became an architect in the 1840s. He built the William Cawthra house (a mansion at the corner of King & Bay, Toronto) which was demolished in 1946. He also built the Ontario Bank building (at the corner of Scott & Wellington). He was also a member of the Orange Order in Canada.

At the time of Confederation, he was the Commissioner of Works and an alderman (1851–1871) in St. Patrick's Ward. He introduced the motion for the August Civic Holiday. In 1851, he is listed as an alderman, a building inspector, and an architect civil engineer. He designed the Dead house in St. Michael's Cemetery, and he had an entry for the design the original Parliament Buildings of Canada in Ottawa in 1859.

When he was Foreman of Public Works, he refused to build the gallows to hang two leaders of the Upper Canada Rebellion, Samuel Lount and Peter Matthews. When he refused he said, 'I'll not put a hand to it,' said he; 'Lount and Matthews have done nothing that I might not have done myself, and I'll never help build a gallows to hang them."

A park was named in his honour on the lot that was once his home (The Mayor Joseph Sheard Parkette). It is found between the streets Yonge, McGill, Anne (now called Granby) and Church (12 McGill St).

His son, Dr. Charles Sheard, became the city's Chief Medical Officer and also served as a Member of Parliament. Other and current living members of the Sheard family include:

- Dr Charles Sheard Jr (1886–1947) – son of Charles Sheard
- Justice Joseph David Sheard (1924–2015) – son of Joseph Louis Sheard (1891–1956), grandson of Joseph Sheard and former Ontario Court of Justice General Division
- Terence Sheard QC (1898–1985) – lawyer and author of Canadian Forms of Wills [1950]
- Matthew Sheard (1840–1910) – architect and son of Joseph Sheard

== Works ==
| Building | Year Completed | Builder | Style | Source | Location | Image |
|---|---|---|---|---|---|---|
| Cawthra House | 1851–1853 | Joseph Sheard and William Irving | Greek Revival | | Northeast corner of King Street West and Bay Street, Toronto, Ontario | |
| Cherry Street Hotel / Palace Street School | 1859 | Joseph Sheard | | 15, 18 | 409 Front Street East | |
| Octagonal mortuary vault; designated historic property under Ontario Heritage Act (1975) | 1855–56 | Joseph Sheard | | | 1414 Yonge Street, St. Michael's Cemetery (Toronto), Deer Park, Toronto, Toronto, Ontario | |
| Ashbridge Estate | 1854 | Joseph Sheard | | | Queen Street East near Coxwell Avenue, Ashbridge's neighbourhood, Toronto | |
| Bishop's Palace, St. Michael's Cathedral Basilica (Toronto) | 1852 additions | Joseph Sheard | | | 200 Church Street | |
| Northfield (home to Sir Oliver Mowat and now part of National Ballet School) | 1856; renovations 2003–2005 | Joseph Sheard | | | 372 Jarvis Street | |
| Tin and Copper Smith Building (now Potbelly Sandwich Shop) | 1857 | Joseph Sheard | | | 83 Yonge Street | |
| Laughlin Lodge (now Julia M. Ruby YWCA Toronto Leadership Centre) | 1858 alterations | Joseph Sheard | | | 87 Elm Street | |

== External ==
- Historic Places in Canada
