= Francis Henry Medcalf =

Canadian politician

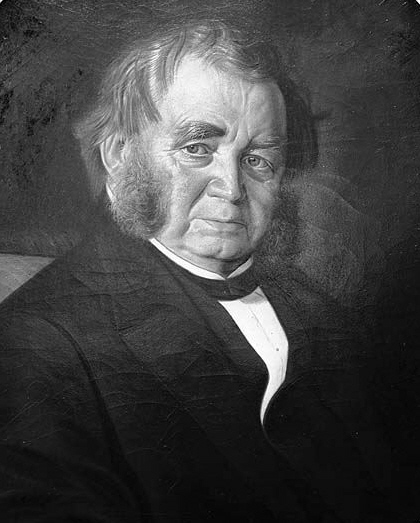

16th Mayor of Toronto
- In office 1864–1866
- Preceded by: John George Bowes
- Succeeded by: James Edward Smith
- In office 1874–1875
- Preceded by: Alexander Manning
- Succeeded by: Angus Morrison

Personal details
- Born: May 10, 1803 Delgany, County Wicklow, Ireland
- Died: March 26, 1880 (aged 76) Toronto, Ontario, Canada
- Resting place: St. James Cemetery, Toronto

Francis Henry Medcalf (May 10, 1803 – March 26, 1880) was a Canadian millwright, iron founder, and Mayor of Toronto during the periods 1864–1866 and 1874–1875. He was also a member of the Orange Order in Canada.

== Early life ==
Medcalf was born in Delgany, County Wicklow, Ireland, in 1803 and moved to Upper Canada in 1819 with his parents, William and Martha Medcalf, and seven siblings. They lived on the Big Otter Creek in Bayham, Ontario. In 1823, Medcalf relocated to Philadelphia in the United States, where he began working as a blacksmith and millwright. He married Mary Harrison in Philadelphia before returning with her to Canada in 1839 to run several foundries in Toronto; they had four sons and two daughters together. He opened the Don Foundry and Machine Shop in 1847, which specialized in the production of agricultural machinery and steam engines.

== Political career ==
Medcalf was heavily involved in the Protestant organization the Orange Order, which had a strong presence in Toronto. Between 1854 and 1862, he held master positions at various Orange Order lodges in Toronto, and was a lodge grand master of Canada West in the period 1862–64. It was his lodge service that led him to Toronto politics and his successful election as alderman of St. Lawrence Ward in 1860 and St. David's Ward in 1863, 1867 and 1868. In 1864 he ran in the election for Mayor of Toronto in opposition to the incumbent mayor John George Bowes. Medcalf was supported by a coalition of Orangemen, Conservatives and Liberals and won the mayoralty. He won again by a large majority in 1865 and ran unopposed in 1866. Between 1867 and 1873, the mayor was selected by Toronto City Council rather than by popular vote, but when the electoral system was restored in 1874 he was re-elected for another two terms until he was defeated by the Conservative member Angus Morrison in 1876. He also ran for election in 1871 in the Toronto East district, but was defeated by Matthew Crooks Cameron.

Medcalf's nickname in politics was "Old Squaretoes", a reference to his foundry work boots, an image he used to promote his "rags-to-riches story". One of his most significant achievements during his time in office was in the development of the Cabbagetown fire department in Toronto.

== Death ==
Medcalf died in Toronto on March 26, 1880, at age 77, and was buried at St. James Cemetery. His son Alfred took over the foundry business after Medcalf's death.
