= Alexander Manning =

Canadian businessman; 20th Mayor of Toronto (1819–1903)

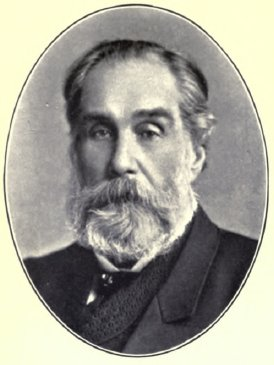

20th Mayor of Toronto
- In office 1873–1873
- Preceded by: Joseph Sheard
- Succeeded by: Francis Henry Medcalf
- In office 1885–1885
- Preceded by: Arthur Radcliffe Boswell
- Succeeded by: William Holmes Howland

Personal details
- Born: 11 May 1819 Dublin, Ireland
- Died: 20 October 1903 (aged 84) Toronto, Ontario, Canada

Alexander Henderson Manning (11 May 1819 – 20 October 1903) was a Canadian contractor, businessman, and the 20th Mayor of Toronto, serving a single term in 1873 and a second in 1885. Born in Ireland, he emigrated to Toronto in 1834. He worked on the construction of several projects, including the Welland Canal and the Library of Parliament. He was elected as alderman for Toronto City Council, representing St. Lawrence Ward in 1856 and 1857. He was re-elected as an alderman from 1867 to 1873. He was selected by the Toronto City Council to be mayor in 1873, but was not reelected the following year when the mayor was chosen by popular vote. He won the election for mayor of Toronto in 1884, but was again unsuccessful in his reelection bid the following year. In his later life, Manning was an investor in the Grand Opera House, funded the construction of Toronto's Old City Hall, and was a director of several companies. At the time of his death in 1903, it was reported that he was the largest individual taxpayer in Toronto.

== Early life and building career ==
Born in Dublin, Ireland, on 11 May 1819, Manning was educated in Dublin and immigrated to Toronto in 1834. Four years later, he lived in Ohio but returned to Toronto after two years. He worked as a builder and was a partner in a sawmill business. He worked on the construction of various projects, including the Welland Canal and the Toronto Normal and Model School.

In the 1850s Manning invested in real estate within Toronto. In the 1860s he demanded overtime payments for constructing roads in Grey County, an act that was used to politically attack Manning for being greedy with obtaining public funds. From 1870 to 1874, he worked with the masonry and brickwork for the Canadian Library of Parliament. He was also an investor for the Toronto Street Railway and constructed railways in Vermont, Pennsylvania, New York, and other locations across Canada.

== Political career and first mayoral term ==
Manning was unsuccessful in his first election for alderman for St. Lawrence Ward with the Toronto City Council in 1855, but was elected to the position the following year and reelected in 1857. He was not an alderman in the following city council.

Manning returned to the Toronto City Council as an alderman for St. Lawrence Ward in 1867, and would be reelected every year until 1873. He nominated himself for mayor of the city in 1872, but was not selected by his fellow councillors for the role. The following year he nominated himself again and was successful. During his time in office, he advocated for a commissioner to be in charge of public projects and the city formed a technique to assess and collect taxes. The city also controversially bought privately owned waterworks, an action that divided the opinions of city council and the public. Manning ran in the 1874 mayoral election, which returned to selecting the mayor by popular vote, but lost due to public allegations of misdeeds during the tendering process of improving the waterworks projects.

== Continuing business career and second mayoral term ==
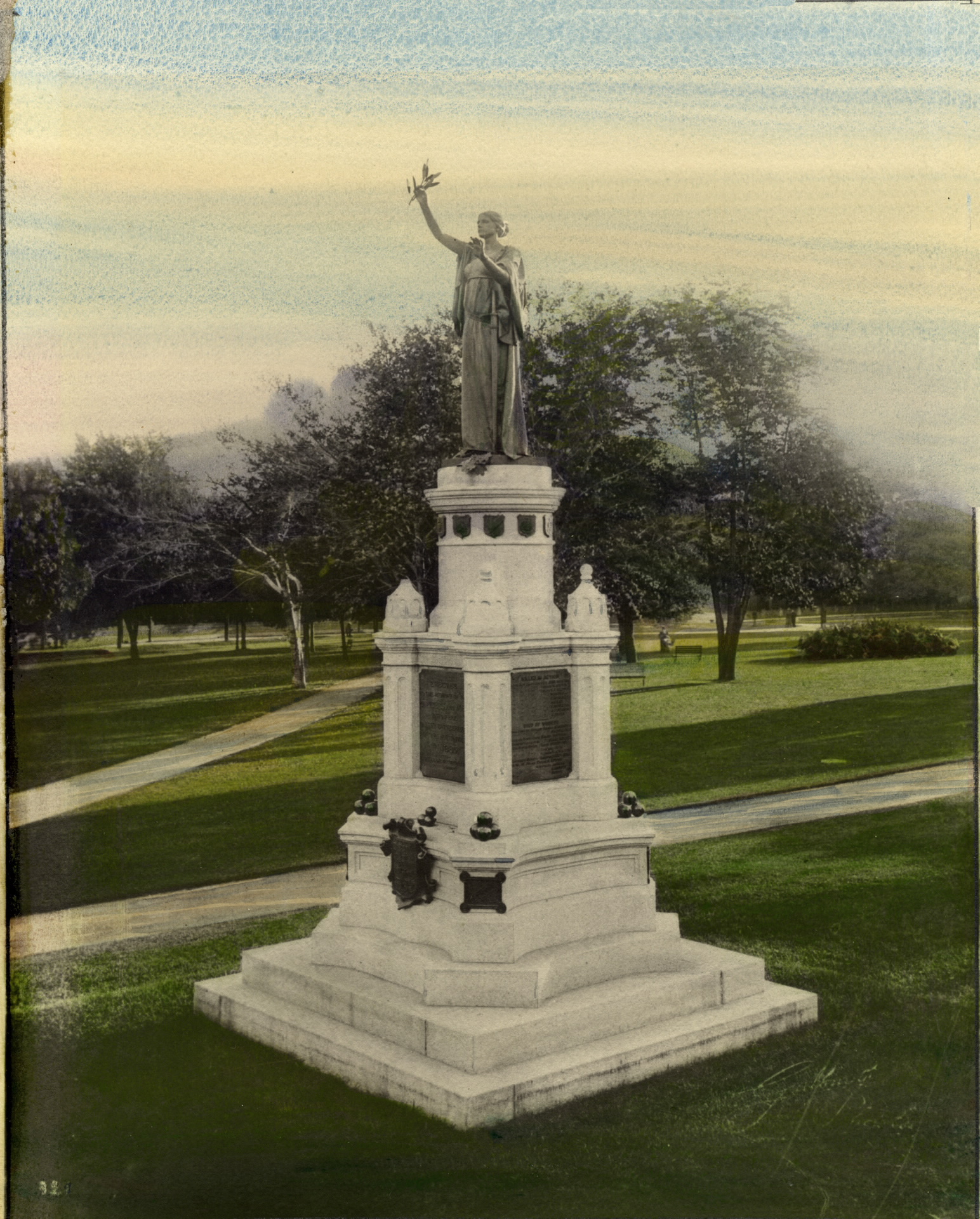
Manning organised a civic committee to collect funds for this monument, commemorating government troops in the North-West Rebellion

During his time as alderman and mayor, Manning won his first government contract to build the Welland Canal and Cornwall Canal. His contract with the Canadian Pacific Railway in 1879 was criticised for being given to Manning because of his influence within the Conservative Party. A royal commission investigated the tendering process and reported that the price of the contract was not rigged but that were irregularities in how the contract was awarded. This controversy hindered his ability to obtain more contracts and his company went bankrupt in 1883.

Manning ran to become mayor in 1879, but came in third. He declined the nomination for mayor in 1881, but in 1884 over 5,000 citizens signed a petition for Manning to run for the position. Manning ran as an independent candidate and focused on his prior experience as mayor and promised financial restraint and clean water within the city. His opponent, John Jacob Withrow, criticised the tax assessments on Manning's income and businesses, and Manning responded by reading his assessor reports out loud and defending the reductions he received. Manning won the mayoral race with the support of Conservative voters.

As mayor, he kept the tax rate low and was an effective administrator of the city. He advocated for a better sanitation system in the city, but was hampered by his association with dishonest associates. He also advocated for the creation of the Home for Incurables. Manning called for the creation of the Toronto Volunteers Reception Committee to prepare events for the return of troops from the North-West Rebellion. He also formed a committee to construct a monument commemorating the men who participated in fighting for the government in the rebellion. The monument was erected in 1895. At first, Manning believed that he would be unchallenged in his reelection as mayor, but a growing civic reform movement organised and produced a candidate named William Holmes Howland. Howard, an advocate for the temperance movement, emphasised Manning's presidency of the Toronto Brewing and Malting Company. Manning supported the Daily Mail in their employment dispute against the Toronto Typographical Union, causing the union to campaign against Manning. Manning was unsuccessful in his reelection campaign.

== Post-political career ==
Manning participated in several Toronto social organisations, including the Irish Protestant Benevolent Society of Toronto, the St. Patrick's Society of Toronto, and the National Club of Toronto. He was also an investor in Toronto's Grand Opera House, and bought the building when it went bankrupt in 1876. In 1884 he hired E. J. Lennox to design a large office block called Manning Arcade, and also funded the construction of Old City Hall in Toronto. He was a member of the Toronto Board of Trade, a director of the Traders Bank of Canada and the Canadian Bank of Commerce, and president of the Toronto Dry Dock and Shipbuilding Company and the North American Land Company Limited.

== Personal life and death ==
Manning married his first wife, Adeline Augusta Whittemore, on 6 February 1850. She died in 1861, and he married his second wife, Susan Celina Smith, later that year on 1 August. He and Smith had two sons and two daughters.

Manning died in Toronto on 20 October 1903. He was buried at St. James Cemetery in a tomb he built for his family. At the time of his death, he was the largest individual ratepayer in Toronto.
