= Adam Wilson (judge) =

Canadian lawyer, judge and political figure (1814–1891)

Sir Adam Wilson
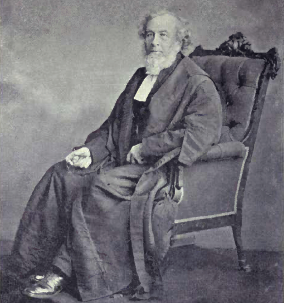

Solicitor General of Upper Canada
- In office May 1862 – 1863

Legislative Member for York North
- In office 1860 – May 1863

15th Mayor of Toronto
- In office 1859–1860
- Preceded by: David Breakenridge Read
- Succeeded by: John George Bowes

Personal details
- Born: September 22, 1814 Edinburgh, Scotland
- Died: December 28, 1891 (aged 77) Toronto, Ontario
- Spouse: Emma Dalton

Sir Adam Wilson QC (September 22, 1814 – December 28, 1891) was a lawyer, judge and political figure in Canada West. He served as mayor of Toronto in 1859 and 1860 and in the Legislative Council of the Province of Canada for York North from 1860 to 1863. After his political career, he served as a judge and was named Chief Justice of the Court of Queen's Bench. At the time of his retirement, he was the longest-serving judge in Ontario and was subsequently knighted.

== Early life and career ==
Adam Wilson was born in Edinburgh, Scotland in 1814 to Jane and Andrew Wilson. He attended Heriot’s Hospital in Edinburgh before immigrating to Halton County, Upper Canada in 1830 to work with his uncle. In 1834, he moved to Toronto where he articled for Robert Baldwin and Robert Baldwin Sullivan and was called to the bar in 1839. The following year, he was made partner at the Baldwin law firm.

In 1850, he became Queen's Counsel and in 1856 he was named to a commission whose work formed the basis for the General Public Statutes of the Province of Canada. In 1858 he was a founding member of the North-West Transportation, Navigation and Railway Company. He also sued Prime Minister John A. Macdonald and two other ministers in 1858 for illegally keeping their political positions.

== Municipal politics ==
Wilson was elected to Toronto city council in 1855, representing St. Patrick’s Ward. He led a group of councillors who were against the influence of the railway companies in council decisions. He also organised an investigation on how Casimir Gzowski won a contract to construct the Esplanade.

Wilson was encouraged to run in the 1859 mayoral election of Toronto by the Municipal Reform Association, a Reform group who opposed the Conservative dominance of Toronto municipal politics. His campaign focused on the railway business’ influence over alderman’s decisions on council. His concerns included the Grand Trunk Railway putting trains between residents and Lake Ontario and the pollution that accumulated in various water sources along the Toronto waterfront. Wilson won the 1859 mayoral election in Toronto’s first direct election for mayor and won a subsequent campaign for mayor in 1860.

His time in office included an initiative to simplify the city’s by-laws, which the Canadian Law Journal cited as an “indescribable confusion.” He also focused on police reform and was a member of the Toronto Board of Police Commissioners when they fired the deputy police chief of Toronto.

== Politics in the Legislative Assembly ==
Wilson was elected to the Legislative Assembly of the Province of Canada in an 1860 by-election in the riding of York North. The following year he was reelected in his York North riding but lost his simultaneous election in the riding of Toronto West. In May 1862 he became Solicitor General for Upper Canada but was not reappointed the following year.

== Judicial career ==
Wilson resigned from politics in 1863 and was named a judge in the Court of Queen's Bench. He was part of the Court of Common Pleas and was an ex-officio judge of Error and Appeal until 1874. In 1871 he was appointed to the Ontario Law Reform Commission. In 1878, Wilson became chief justice in the Court of Common Pleas and, in 1884, was named to the same function in the Court of Queen's Bench.

In 1876 Wilson claimed that George Brown wrote a letter “for corrupt purposes” and that Reform engaged in corrupt practices during previous elections. Brown was asked to answer this letter in front of judges in a “contempt of court” charge. The judges in this case disagreed on their findings and there were no further proceedings.

In his rulings, Wilson would bring together applicable precedents but have little analysis of how they worked together to come to a conclusion. He also cited American law and tried to show independence from British law. He was also credited with the huge amount of research that he conducted for his rulings.

== Writing career ==
In 1861 Wilson wrote The constable’s guide; a sketch of the office of constable.

== Honours and achievements ==
At his retirement Wilson was the longest-serving judge in Ontario. He was also knighted. Wilson Township in Parry Sound District, Ontario is named after him.

== Personal life and death ==
Wilson married Emma Dalton on May 1, 1841, and adopted a daughter.

Wilson was a patron of the Anglican Church of the Redeemer. He died in Toronto on December 28, 1891.
