= Edward Frederick Clarke =

Canadian politician

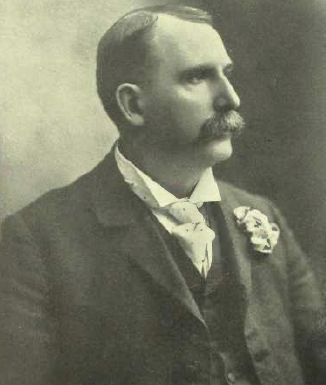

Member of the Legislative Assembly of Ontario for Toronto
- In office 1886–1894

26th Mayor of Toronto
- In office 1888–1891
- Preceded by: William Holmes Howland
- Succeeded by: Robert John Fleming

Member of the Canadian Parliament for West Toronto
- In office 1896–1904 Serving with Edmund Boyd Osler
- Preceded by: Frederick Charles Denison
- Succeeded by: Edmund Boyd Osler

Member of the Canadian Parliament for Toronto Centre
- In office 1904–1905
- Preceded by: William Rees Brock
- Succeeded by: Edmund James Bristol

Personal details
- Born: April 24, 1850 Bailieborough, County Cavan, Ireland
- Died: March 3, 1905 (aged 54) Toronto
- Party: Conservative Party of Canada
- Other political affiliations: Conservative Party of Ontario

Edward Frederick Clarke (April 24, 1850 – March 3, 1905) was a Canadian journalist and political figure. He was Mayor of Toronto for four one-year terms, from 1888 until 1891 while also representing Toronto in the Legislative Assembly of Ontario from 1886 to 1894 and West Toronto from 1896 to 1904 and Toronto Centre from 1904 to 1905 in the House of Commons of Canada as a Conservative member. He attempted to regain the mayoralty in 1900 but was defeated by Ernest A. Macdonald. He was also a member of the Orange Order in Canada.

He was born in Bailieboro, County Cavan, Ireland in 1850, the son of merchant Richard Clarke, and came to Toronto in 1864 after the death of his father. He apprenticed as a printer with the Toronto Globe, later working with The Toronto Mail. In 1872, he was one of the leaders of a printers' strike in the city. Clarke was the editor and publisher of the Sentinel, a weekly newspaper associated with the Orange Order, which was widely distributed throughout North America between 1877 and 1896. In 1884, he married Charlotte Elizabeth Scott. He also served as the manager of the Excelsior Life Insurance Company of Toronto.

He died at home in Toronto in 1905 from heart failure. He had been suffering from pneumonia in the weeks leading up to his death.
