= John George Bowes =

Canadian politician (1812–1864)

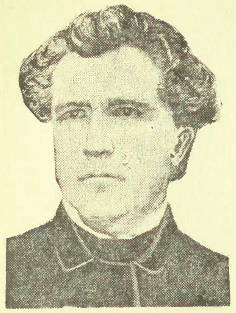

9th Mayor of Toronto
- In office 1851–1853
- Preceded by: George Gurnett
- Succeeded by: Joshua George Beard
- In office 1861–1863
- Preceded by: Adam Wilson
- Succeeded by: Francis Henry Medcalf

Personal details
- Born: ca. 1812 near Clones, County Monaghan, Ireland
- Died: May 20, 1864 Toronto, Canada West

John George Bowes (ca. 1812 – May 20, 1864) was a railway promoter and politician in the Province of Canada. He was also a member of the Orange Order in Canada.

He was born in Clones, County Monaghan, Ireland around 1812 and came to Upper Canada in 1833. He worked for his brother-in-law in York, Upper Canada (later Toronto), then opened a dry goods business with another brother-in-law in 1838.

He was president of the Toronto and Guelph Railway, partnering with John Wellington Gwynne, and also served on the board of directors of several other companies. In 1850, he was elected to city council and council selected him as mayor in 1851, 1852 and 1853.

His mayoralty of Toronto was clouded by claims of corruption. In 1853 George Taylor Denison II, and several other alderman, resigned mid-term to protest what they described as Bowes corruption. Bowes and Francis Hincks had benefitted from a bailout of the Toronto, Simcoe & Lake Huron Union Railroad (later the Northern Railway. Hincks, in his capacity as the Province of Canada's Inspector General (effectively Finance Minister), had sponsored legislation to issue bonds to pay back the railway's investors, without revealing that he and Bowes had bought out a large block of the stock, at a discounted value. The pair netted a quick gain of 10,000 pounds - a fortune in those days.

Although he was cleared of any charges, Bowes was forced to pay the profit that he had made to the city. In 1854, he was elected to the Legislative Assembly of the Province of Canada representing Toronto. He was elected to city council again in 1856 and served as mayor from 1861 to 1863. He died in Toronto in 1864.
