= Ernest A. Macdonald =

Canadian politician (1858–1902)

Ernest Albert Macdonald
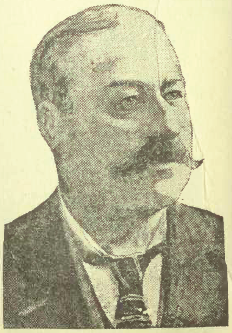

30th Mayor of Toronto
- In office 1900–1900
- Preceded by: John Shaw
- Succeeded by: Oliver Aiken Howland

Personal details
- Born: 1858 Oswego, New York
- Died: December 18, 1902 (aged 43–44)

Ernest Albert Macdonald (1858 – December 18, 1902) was Mayor of Toronto in 1900.

Born in Oswego, New York, Macdonald emigrated to Brockville, Ontario with his family in 1861. He was a manufacturer and owned the Juvenile Manufacturing Company before entering the real estate business where he made his fortune as a developer and was responsible for developing the Chester Avenue and Danforth Avenue area and securing streetcar service on Broadview Avenue to support the neighbourhood. He also developed a suburb around the Bellamy Grand Trunk Railway station in the area now known as Scarborough Village. Macdonald built up and lost a real estate fortune which would have been worth millions in 21st-century dollars.

He was a member of the Toronto City Council as an alderman for St. Matthew's Ward in 1886, 1887, and 1889, St James' Ward in 1890 and the First Ward in 1896 and ran three times unsuccessfully for mayor, in 1891, 1898, and 1899, before being elected in 1900. He served for one year and lost when he ran for re-election in the 1901 Toronto municipal election, coming in third. His defeat led to a nervous breakdown. He died in 1902 after a lengthy battle with syphilis. He also ran for the Canadian House of Commons unsuccessfully as an independent in Toronto East in 1881, and stood as an Independent Conservative in the 1894 Ontario general election in the provincial Toronto East riding, but withdrew before the election to support the Liberal candidate. He also launched two newspapers, The Evening Sun in 1891 and a weekly called The Factor, which both failed after a few months. The Evening Sun, advocated the annexation of Canada by the United States, reflecting Macdonald's views at the time. This caused his commission as a lieutenant in the 12th York Rangers to be withdrawn and was used against him in his later political campaigns. During his successful 1900 mayoral campaign, he maintained that he no longer favoured annexation. Macdonald had also proposed a scheme in the 1890s, promoted by The Factor, to build a canal linking the Humber River and Georgian Bay and also using the project to generate hydro-electricity, to no avail.

He was also a member of the Orange Order in Canada.
