= General MacDonell =

General MacDonell may refer to:

- Archibald Cameron Macdonell (1864–1941), Canadian Army lieutenant general
- Archibald Hayes Macdonell (1868–1939), Canadian Army brigadier general
- James Macdonell (British Army officer) (1781–1857), British Army general

== See also ==
- Attorney General McDonell (disambiguation)
