= Charles Constantine =

Charles Constantine may refer to:

- Charles Constantine of Vienne (died 962), Count of Vienne
- Charles Constantine (police officer) (1846–1912), Canadian North-West Mounted Police officer and superintendent
- Charles Francis Constantine (1883–1954), his son, Canadian general and commandant of the Royal Military College of Canada

== See also ==
- Charles Constantin (disambiguation)
