= Charles Drury (disambiguation) =

Charles Drury was a Canadian politician.

Charles Drury may also refer to:

- Charles Alfred Drury, Ontario MPP and cabinet minister
- Charles Carter Drury, Canadian Royal Navy admiral
- Charles Drury (priest), British priest
- Charles William Drury, Canadian general
- Charles Drury (footballer), English association football player
