= 1st Regiment, Royal Canadian Horse Artillery =

- Active: 1871–present
- Country: Canada
- Branch: Canadian Army
- Type: Horse artillery
- Role: Artillery
- Size: 5 batteries
- Part of: Royal Canadian Horse Artillery; 1 Canadian Mechanized Brigade Group
- Garrison/HQ: CFB Shilo
- Mottos: Ubique (Latin for 'everywhere'); Quo fas et gloria ducunt (Latin for 'whither right and glory lead')
- March: Slow march: "Royal Artillery Slow March"; Quick march: "British Grenadiers"; Trot past: "Keel Row"; Gallop past: "Bonnie Dundee"
- Engagements: North-West Rebellion; South African War; First World War; Second World War; Korean War; Afghanistan
- Battle honours: The word Ubique (Latin for 'everywhere'), takes the place of all past and future battle honours in recognition of the artillery's widespread service in all battles and campaigns since its creation

The 1st Regiment, Royal Canadian Horse Artillery is a regular artillery regiment of the Canadian Army. It is based at CFB Shilo. It forms part of the 3rd Canadian Division's 1 Canadian Mechanized Brigade Group.

== Lineage ==
- Originated on 1 December 1898, in Kingston, Ontario and Quebec City, Quebec, as the Royal Canadian Artillery (Field Division) of The Royal Canadian Artillery
- Redesignated on 1 June 1901, as the Royal Canadian Field Artillery
- Redesignated on 1 September 1905, as the Royal Canadian Horse Artillery
- Redesignated on 16 October 1946, as the 71st Regiment (Royal Canadian Horse Artillery)
- Redesignated on 7 July 1949, as the 1st Field Regiment, Royal Canadian Horse Artillery
- Redesignated on 18 June 1951, as the 1st Regiment, Royal Canadian Horse Artillery

== Batteries ==
- A (The Queen's) Battery, RCHA
- B Battery, RCHA
- C Battery, RCHA
- Z Battery, RCHA
- Headquarters and Services Battery

== History ==
=== The South African War ===
On 20 December 1899, the Royal Canadian Artillery (Field Division) mobilized the Brigade Division, Royal Canadian Artillery for active service and on 21 February 1900, the brigade embarked for South Africa. After arrival, its batteries provided field artillery support to the Imperial forces in the eastern Transvaal, north Cape Colony, Griqualand West and with the Rhodesian Field Force. On 21 January 1901, the active service brigade was disbanded.

=== The First World War ===
On 6 August 1914, the Royal Canadian Horse Artillery was placed on active service for instructional and camp administration duties.

On 26 August 1914, the RCHA mobilized the Royal Canadian Horse Artillery Brigade, CEF and on 30 September 1914, the regiment embarked for Great Britain. On 20 July 1915, the regiment disembarked in France where it provided mobile field artillery support as part of the Canadian Cavalry Brigade in France and Flanders until the end of the war. On 23 October 1920, the brigade was disbanded.

=== The Second World War ===
On 1 September 1939, the Royal Canadian Horse Artillery was mobilized for active service as the 1st Field Brigade, RCA, CASF. On 21 December 1939, the regiment was redesignated as 1st Field Regiment, RCA, CASF and embarked for Great Britain as part of the 1st Canadian Infantry Division. In June 1940, the regiment arrived in France as part of the Second British Expeditionary Force, reaching a point west of Le Mans before being ordered back to the UK. On 1 January 1941, the regiment was redesignated as 1st Field Regiment, RCHA, CASF. The regiment landed in Sicily in July 1943 and in Italy in September 1943, providing field artillery support for the 1st Canadian Infantry Division. In March 1945, the regiment moved with the I Canadian Corps to North West Europe where it served until the end of the war. On 25 August 1945, the overseas regiment was disbanded.

On 1 June 1945, a second Active Force component of the regiment was mobilized for service in the Pacific theatre of operations under the designation of the 1st Canadian Field Artillery Battalion, RCA, CASF. On 1 September 1945, the regiment was redesignated as the 2nd/1st Field Regiment, RCHA, CASF and again on 1 March 1946, as the 71st Regiment, RCHA, CASF. On 27 June 1946, the regiment was embodied in the Permanent Force.

In July 1949 the 71st Regiment (Royal Canadian Horse Artillery) became the 1st Field Regiment, Royal Canadian Horse Artillery.

=== Korean War ===
From May 1952 to April 1953, 1 RCHA served in Korea as part of the 25th Canadian Infantry Brigade, 1st Commonwealth Division.

== Commandants ==
| Name | Year | Significance | Photo |
|---|---|---|---|
| Colonel (Major-General) Charles William Drury, CB | 1901–1905 | Known as "Father of Modern Artillery in Canada" | |
| Lieutenant-Colonel J.A. Fages | 1905–1906 | | |
| Lieutenant-Colonel H.E. Burstall | 1907 | Acting Commanding Officer | |
| Lieutenant-Colonel (Lieutenant-General) Sir Henry Edward Burstall, KCB, KCMG, ADC | 1908–1911 | GOC of the Royal Canadian Artillery; Commanded 2nd Canadian Division; Quartermaster-General at Department of National Defence | |
| Lieutenant-Colonel (Major-General) Henri Alexandre Panet CB, CMG, DSO | 1911–1916 | Colonel Commandant of the Royal Canadian Artillery | |
| Lieutenant-Colonel (Major-General) William Henry Pferinger Elkins, CB, CBE, DSO | 1916–1922 | Commandant of the Royal Military College of Canada; Commander in Chief Atlantic Command | |
| Lieutenant-Colonel (Major-General) Charles Francis Constantine, CB, DSO, ADC | 1922–1925 | Commandant of the Royal Military College of Canada | |
| Lieutenant-Colonel (Major-General) William Henry Pferinger Elkins, CB, CBE, DSO | 1925–1926 | Commandant of the Royal Military College of Canada; Commander in Chief Atlantic Command | |
| Lieutenant-Colonel (Brigadier-General) H.E. Boak DSO | 1926–1929 | | |
| Lieutenant-Colonel (Brigadier-General) JC Stewart CBE, DSO | 1929–1934 | | |
| Lieutenant-Colonel (Colonel) W.G. Hagarty, DSO | 1934–1938 | | |
| Lieutenant-Colonel (Brigadier-General) C.V. Stockwell, DSO | 1938–1939 | | |
| Lieutenant-Colonel (Major-General) John Hamilton Roberts CB DSO MC | 1939–1940 | Commanded 2nd Canadian Division; Commanded the Dieppe Raid | Ham-Roberts-PA-153531lrg |
| Lieutenant-Colonel (Lieutenant-General) Guy Granville Simonds, CC, CB, CBE, DSO, CD | 1940–1940 | Chief of the General Staff; Commandant of the Canadian Army Command and Staff College; Commander of II Canadian Corps; Commander of 5th Canadian Armoured Division; Commander of 1st Canadian Infantry Division; Commander of 2nd Canadian Infantry Division; Commander of 1st Canadian Infantry Brigade | Guy Simonds e010786106-v8 |
| Lieutenant-Colonel (Brigadier-General) T.H. Musgrave OBE, ED | 1940–1942 | | |
| Lieutenant-Colonel (Brigadier-General) John Napier Lane, DSO | 1942–1944 | | |
| Lieutenant-Colonel (Brigadier-General) H.E. Brown OBE, ED, CD | 1944–1944 | | |
| Lieutenant-Colonel F.E. McCordick OBE, ED | 1944–1945 | | |
| Lieutenant-Colonel (Brigadier-General) H.E. Brown OBE, ED, CD | 1945–1945 | | |
| Lieutenant-Colonel (Colonel) R.H. Webb DSO, CD | 1945–1949 | | |
| Lieutenant-Colonel E.M. Hodson, DSO, CD | 1949–1951 | | |
| Lieutenant-Colonel (Brigadier-General) Edward Murray Dalziel Leslie (né McNaughton), DSO, CD | 1951–1955 | Chief of Staff of the United Nations' Force in Cyprus | |
| Lieutenant-Colonel (Colonel) N.W. Reilander, CD | 1955–1959 | | |
| Lieutenant-Colonel (Colonel) J.O.V.F. Menard CD | 1959–1962 | | |
| Lieutenant-Colonel M.L.A. Chabot, CD | 1962–1965 | | |
| Lieutenant-Colonel D.B. Crowe, CD | 1965–1967 | | |
| Lieutenant-Colonel (Major-General) D.R. Baker, CMM, CD | 1967–1969 | | |
| Lieutenant-Colonel (Colonel) M.D. Calnan, CD | 1969–1971 | | |
| Lieutenant-Colonel (Colonel) H.J. Stein, CD | 1971–1973 | Director of Royal Canadian Artillery (Jul 77 – Aug 80) | |
| Lieutenant-Colonel R.L. Strawbridge, CD | 1973–1975 | | |
| Lieutenant-Colonel (Colonel) D.J. Walters, CD | 1975–1977 | | |
| Lieutenant-Colonel (Colonel) D.B. McGibbon, CD | 1977–1979 | Director of Royal Canadian Artillery (Jul 83 – Aug 85) | |
| Lieutenant-Colonel (Colonel) D.B. Walton, OMM, CD | 1979–1981 | | |
| Lieutenant-Colonel (Colonel) L.T.B. Mintz, CD | 1981–1983 | | |
| Lieutenant-Colonel (Colonel) G.J. Oehring, CD | 1983–1985 | | |
| Lieutenant-Colonel (Colonel) J.E. Miller, CD | 1985–1987 | | |
| Lieutenant-Colonel D.S. Moreside, CD | 1987–1989 | | |
| Lieutenant-Colonel (Lieutenant-General) Jan Arp, CMM, CD | 1989–1991 | Chief of Military Personnel; Commander of Land Force Doctrine and Training System; Chief of Staff, NATO's Headquarters Supreme Allied Command Transformation | |
| Lieutenant-Colonel (Colonel) J.M. Petryk CD | 1991–1992 | | |
| Lieutenant-Colonel (Colonel) M.D. Capstick, CD | 1992–1993 | Director of Royal Canadian Artillery (Jul 98 – Aug 00) | |
| Lieutenant-Colonel (Lieutenant-General) The Honourable, Andrew Brooke Leslie PC CMM MSC MSM CD, MP | 1993–1995 | Chief Government Whip; Member of Parliament for Orléans; Chief of the Land Staff | |
| Lieutenant-Colonel (Colonel) S.J. Gillies, CD | 1995–1997 | Director of Royal Canadian Artillery (Aug 00 – Jun 02) | |
| Lieutenant-Colonel (Colonel) M.D. Hodgson, CD | 1997–1999 | | |
| Lieutenant-Colonel (Major-General) Alan John Howard, CMM, CD | 1999–2001 | Military Lead of the Defence Renewal Team | |
| Lieutenant-Colonel (Colonel) R.K. Chamberlain, CD | 2001–2003 | | |
| Lieutenant-Colonel (Colonel) I.A. Miezitis, CD | 2003–2005 | | |
| Lieutenant-Colonel (Colonel) P.J. Williams, CD | 2005–2007 | | |
| Lieutenant-Colonel (Colonel) T.J. Bishop, OMM, MSM, CD | 2007–2009 | Director of Royal Canadian Artillery (Mar 14 – Dec 16) | |
| Lieutenant-Colonel (Colonel) T.R. Young, CD | 2009–2011 | | |
| Lieutenant-Colonel (Colonel) L.J. Hammond, MSM, CD | 2011–2013 | | |
| Lieutenant-Colonel (Colonel) S.W. Taylor, CD | 2013–2016 | | |
| Lieutenant-Colonel (Colonel) S.G. Haire, CD | 2016–2018 | | |
| Lieutenant-Colonel R.T. Stimpson, CD | 2018–2020 | | |
| Lieutenant-Colonel D.Y.G. Brassard, CD | 2020–2022 | | |
| Lieutenant-Colonel J.P. O'Donnell, CD | 2022–2024 | | |
| Lieutenant-Colonel J.M.F. Beatty, CD | 2024-2026 | | |
| Lieutenant-Colonel J.P.R.F. Knox, CD | 2026- | | |

== Alliances ==
- United Kingdom - 1st Regiment Royal Horse Artillery
