= Archibald Macdonell =

Archibald Macdonell may refer to:

- Archibald Cameron Macdonell (1864–1941), Canadian police officer and soldier
- Archibald Hayes Macdonell (1868–1939), Canadian soldier and politician
- A. G. Macdonell (Archibald Gordon Macdonell, 1895–1941), Scottish writer, journalist and broadcaster
