= 1st Canadian Artillery Brigade =

1st Canadian Artillery Brigade (2026–Present) 1st Field Artillery Brigade (1914–1919)
- Active: 1914–1919; 10 September 2026–Present
- Country: Canada
- Branch: Canadian Expeditionary Force (1914-1919); Canadian Army (2026-Present)
- Type: Artillery
- Role: Artillery Support
- Size: Brigade
- Part of: 1st Canadian Division (1914-1919, 2026-Present)
- Garrison/HQ: CFB Edmonton
- Nickname: The Fires Brigade
- Engagements: World War I: Second Battle of Ypres; Battle of the Somme; Hundred Days Offensive

The 1st Canadian Artillery Brigade is an Artillery Brigade of the Canadian Army.

== History ==
=== World War I ===
The brigade was formed as the 1st Field Artillery Brigade, Canadian Field Artillery in 1914 for service overseas. It was attached to the 1st Canadian Division. After training in England, the brigade arrived in France in February 1915. The brigade first saw action at the Second Battle of Ypres where they witnessed the soldiers and horses of the 45th Algerian Division succumb to gas poisoning. The brigade later participated in the Battle of the Somme where 12 of its members were killed. The brigade later participated in the Hundred Days Offensive before it was disbanded in 1919.

=== Reactivation ===
The brigade was reformed as the 1st Canadian Artillery Brigade on 10 September 2026 during a restructuring of the Canadian Armed Forces. It is nicknamed "The Fires Brigade" and is attached to the 1st Canadian Division. The purpose of the brigade is to centralize and coordinate the 1st Canadian Division's artillery prior to the conduction of manoeuvre warfare.

== Structure during World War I ==
The brigade's structure during World War I was as follows:

- 1st Field Artillery Brigade, Canadian Field Artillery
  - 1st Field Battery
  - 2nd Howitzer Battery
  - 3rd Field Battery
  - 4th Field Battery

== Current structure ==
As of September 2026 the brigade's structure is as follows:

- 1st Canadian Artillery Brigade
  - 1st Regiment, Royal Canadian Horse Artillery (1 RCHA)
  - 2nd Regiment, Royal Canadian Horse Artillery (2 RCHA)
  - 5^{e} Régiment d'artillerie légère du Canada (5 RALC)

== Planned structure ==
The brigade's planned structure is as follows:

- 1st Canadian Artillery Brigade
  - 1st Regiment, Royal Canadian Horse Artillery (1 RCHA)
  - 2nd Regiment, Royal Canadian Horse Artillery (2 RCHA)
  - 5^{e} Régiment d'artillerie légère du Canada (5 RALC)
  - 9th Rocket Regiment, Royal Canadian Artillery (2030) (Note: 1st battalion formed, full regiment expected to reach operational capacity by 2030)
  - Unmanned Aerial Systems (UAS) Regiment (2030)
