= Robert Alexander Harrison =

Canadian politician

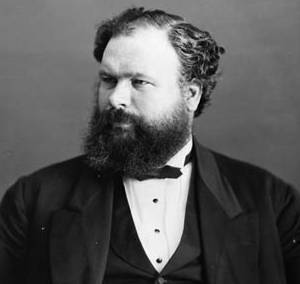

Member of the Canada Parliament for West Toronto
- In office November 6, 1867 – July 8, 1872
- Succeeded by: John Willoughby Crawford

2nd Chief Justice of Ontario
- In office 1875–1878
- Preceded by: William Buell Richards
- Succeeded by: Thomas Moss

Personal details
- Born: 3 August 1833 Montreal, Lower Canada
- Died: 1 November 1878 (aged 45) Toronto, Ontario, Canada
- Party: Conservative
- Education: Trinity College, Toronto

Robert Alexander Harrison, QC (3 August 1833 – 1 November 1878) was a Canadian lawyer, judge and politician who represented West Toronto in the 1st Canadian Parliament as a Conservative member.

== Early life ==
Harrison was born in Montreal, Lower Canada in 1833, the son of Irish immigrants. The family moved to Markham Township and then Toronto. Harrison studied at Upper Canada College and Trinity College, Toronto. He studied law and was called to the bar in 1855.

== Career ==
He served as chief clerk of the Crown Law Department from 1854 to 1859; and then entered private practice. In 1867, Harrison was named Queen's Counsel. He served on Toronto city council in 1867 and 1868. He was also a director of the Toronto, Grey and Bruce Railway. In 1875, he was named chief justice for the Court of Queen's Bench of Ontario.

Harrison contributed articles to several legal journals and newspapers, serving for a time as joint editor for the Upper Canada Law Journal. He was one of the arbitrators involved in establishing the western boundary for the province of Ontario.

== Death ==
Harrison died in Toronto in 1878, at the age of 45.

== Family ==
On 2 June 1859 Alexander first married Anna Eliza Muckle. In Toronto, Ontario, on 11 August 1864, they had their daughter, Anna. On 26 March 1866, wife Anna died. In 1868 Robert remarried. The second wife of Hon. Robert A. Harrison, U.C.L., Chief Justice of Ontario, was Kennithina Johana Mackay, daughter of Hugh Scobie, editor of the British Colonist. The couple had one daughter, Justine A. Harrison, who was born in Toronto, and educated, mainly, abroad. While living at Dresden she studied Dresden decoration under Lamm, Ley Kauf and Mrs. Wagner.
