= Henrietta Constantine =

Canadian photographer (1857–1934)

- Born: Henrietta Anne Armstrong; Ottawa, United Province of Canada
- Known for: Agnes Etherington Art Centre
- Spouse: Charles Constantine

Henrietta Anne Constantine (1857 – 1934) was a Canadian photographer.

== Life ==
The daughter of Edward A. Armstrong, she was born Henrietta Anne Armstrong in Ottawa, United Province of Canada and moved with her family to Winnipeg in 1872. She married Lieutenant Charles Constantine of the North-West Mounted Police there the following year; the couple had three sons. Both her husband and her father were members of the expedition led by Garnet Joseph Wolseley. During the 1890s and the early 1910s, she travelled with her husband in western Canada, took photographs of the landscape and collected First Nations art. Following her husband's death in 1912, Constantine moved to Kingston to live with her son Charles Francis.

She died in Kingston in 1934.

Her photographs are held in private collections and in the collection of the National Archives of Canada.

Her collection was purchased by Agnes Etherington to form the basis of the Agnes Etherington Art Centre. A 2011 exhibition based on her art collection "The Constantine Collection of Northern Indigenous Art" travelled to various Ontario museums and galleries.
