= Charles Sheard =

Canadian politician

Dr. Charles Sheard

Member of Parliament for Toronto South
- In office 1917–1925
- Preceded by: Angus Claude Macdonell
- Succeeded by: George Reginald Geary

Personal details
- Born: February 15, 1857 Toronto, Canada West
- Died: February 7, 1929 (aged 71) Toronto
- Party: Unionist, Conservative
- Spouse: Virna Stanton
- Profession: physician, professor

Charles Sheard, M.D. (February 15, 1857 – February 7, 1929) was a medical doctor, public health official and politician.

Sheard was born in Toronto and educated at Upper Canada College and the Trinity College Medical School earning a gold medal upon his graduation in 1879. He conducted postgraduate work in Europe and became a Member of the Royal College of Surgeons (M.R.C.S.) in London, England. Upon his return to Toronto he was appointed Chair of Physiology at Trinity and retained that position at the new amalgamated Department of Medicine when Trinity joined the University of Toronto in 1904, remaining with the institution until 1912. He was also associated with The Lancet medical journal.

From 1893 to 1910, Sheard was also Toronto's chief medical officer and head of the city's Department of Health. He served as chairman of the province of Ontario's Board of Health from 1904 until 1909.

Sheard served as president of the Canadian Medical Association in 1892.

He was elected to the House of Commons of Canada in the 1917 federal election as the Unionist Member of Parliament for Toronto South and was re-elected in the 1921 federal election as a Conservative but did not stand for re-election in 1925.

Sheard was the son of Joseph Sheard who served as Mayor of Toronto in 1871 and 1872. He was also a member of the Orange Order and an Anglican as well as an owner of several prominent Toronto business corners.

Sheard also had a home on Toronto Islands at Hanlan's Point.

== 314 Jarvis Street ==
Sheard lived at 314 Jarvis Street, a Beaux Arts home built in 1865. The home survives today, but altered and damaged by fires in 2016 and 2019.
