= Charles Moss (judge) =

Canadian lawyer and judge

Sir Charles Moss
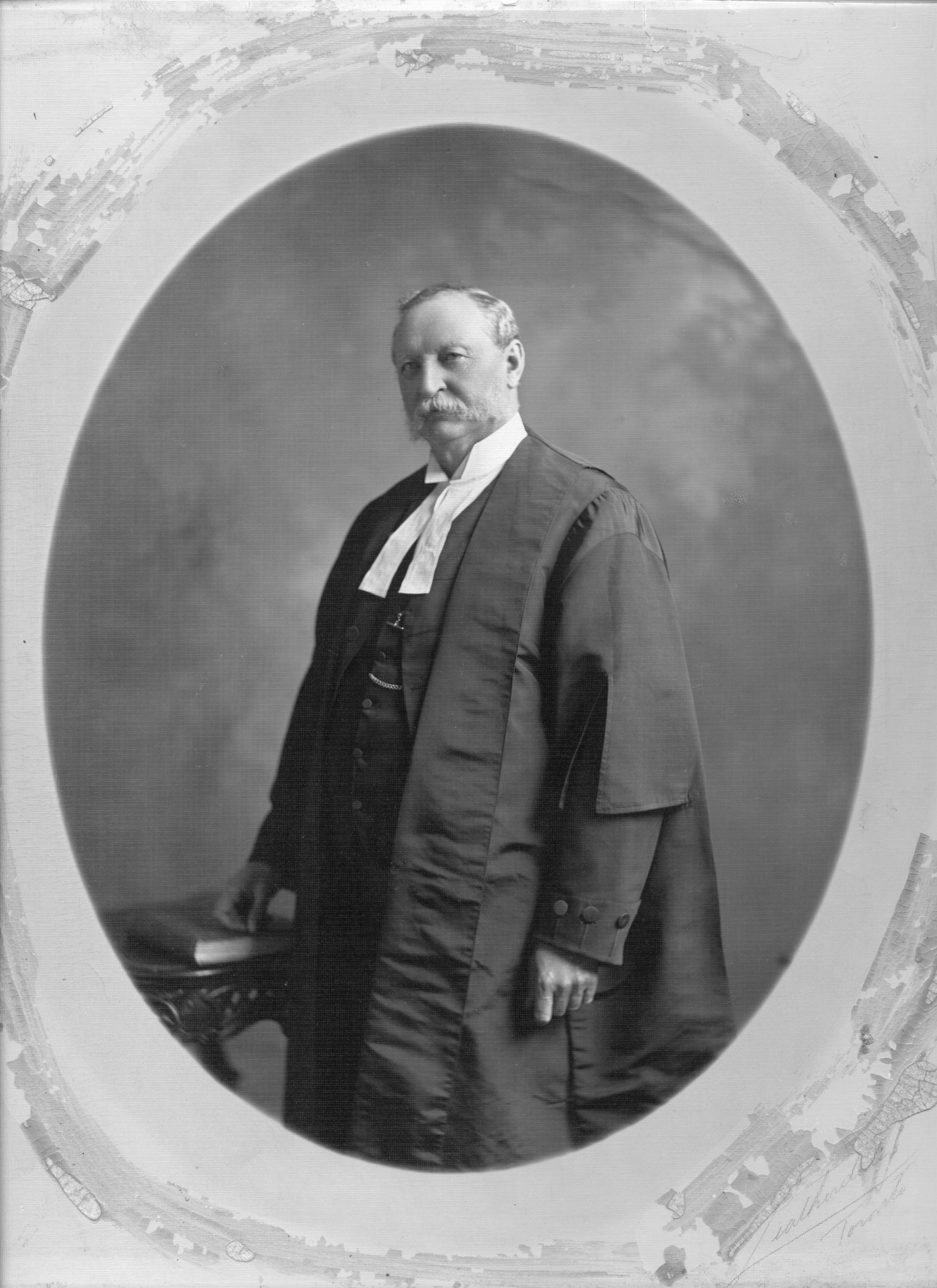
- Born: March 8, 1840; Cobourg, Upper Canada
- Died: October 11, 1912 (aged 72); Toronto, Ontario
- Known for: Lawyer and judge

Sir Charles Moss (March 8, 1840 – October 11, 1912) was a Canadian lawyer and judge.

Born in Cobourg, Upper Canada, the son of Irish Church of Ireland immigrants, Moss was educated in Cobourg and Toronto. He was admitted to the Law Society of Upper Canada in 1864 and articled with his brother Thomas Moss. He was called to the bar in 1869 and was named a Queen's Counsel in 1881. He practised law in Toronto and was named a puisne judge of the Ontario Court of Appeal in 1897. In 1902, he was made chief justice. Moss refused a seat on the Supreme Court of Canada in 1903. He was made a Knight Bachelor in 1907.

In 1910, Moss developed cancer and took a leave from his judicial duties in January 1912. He died in October 1912.
