= North-West Mounted Police in the Canadian north =

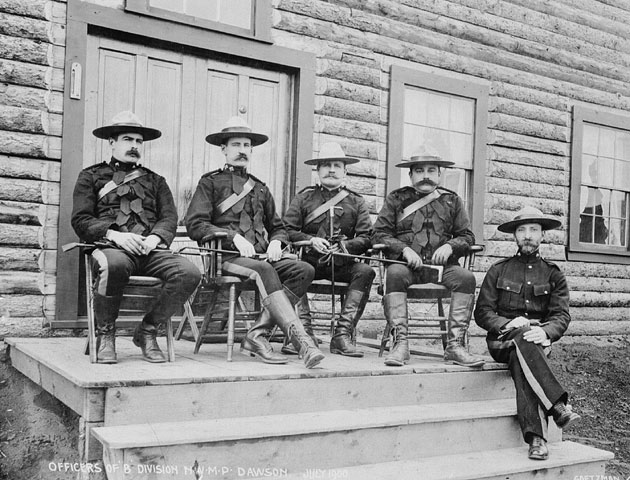
North-West Mounted Police officers, Yukon, 1900

The history of the North-West Mounted Police in the Canadian north describes the activities of the North-West Mounted Police in the North-West Territories at the end of the 19th century and the start of the 20th. The mounted police had been established to control the prairies along the Canadian-United States border in 1873, but were then also deployed to control the Yukon region during the Klondike Gold Rush, and subsequently expanded their operations into the Hudson Bay area and the far north. The force was amalgamated in 1920 to form part of the new Royal Canadian Mounted Police, who continued their predecessors' work across the region.

== Early days in the Yukon ==
The Yukon had no existing government presence in the late 19th century. In 1894 a growing population and gold mining at Forty Mile, led to calls from Church and business leaders for Ottawa to intervene to control whisky trading, protect the local Indians and gather customs duties. In response, Inspector Constantine and Staff Sergeant Charles Brown carried out a survey along the Yukon River. Constantine left Brown to run the justice and customs system in the Yukon - then around a thousand white people - when he left in the autumn. The government surveyor William Ogilvie warned Ottawa that it was necessary to introduce Canadian government quickly to the region if a United States takeover was to be avoided. Constantine was therefore sent back to establish a detachment of twenty NWMP at Forty Mile the next summer, constructing Fort Constantine to form their barracks. Dog-sled patrols were conducted during the winter months. Frictions soon became apparent with the Miners' Committees which had evolved to provide informal justice over the previous few years. Constantine brought this to a head in June 1896, sending a team into one of the mining camps to intervene and overturn the decisions of the local committee. Very little actual crime.

== Klondike Gold Rush ==
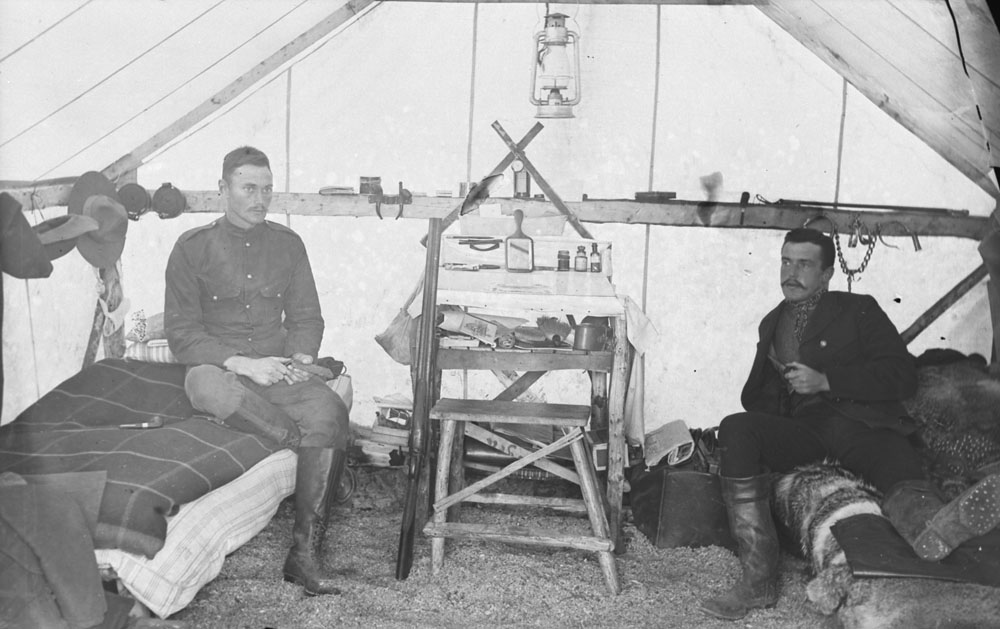
Tent picture

In 1896, huge amounts of gold were discovered in the Klondike valley. Miners streamed from Forty Mile to the new town of Dawson and, once word got out to the external world the next year, around 100,000 more rushed to the region in search of gold. (Note: The initial broad estimates of the numbers involved in the stampede were produced by Pierre Berton, drawing on a number of sources, including the NWMP statistics generated along the trails. The most recent academic work continues to accept these estimates, but further detailed analysis has been carried out, using the first, limited Yukon census by the NWMP that occurred in 1898 and the more detailed Federal census in 1901. The historian Charlene Porsild has conducted extensive work on these records, comparing them to other documentary accounts of the period. This has generated improved statistics for the nationality and gender of those involved in the gold rush.) To reach the Klondike, many travelled by foot over arduous mountain routes and along rivers using primitive boats, and no more than around 30–40,000 successfully reached the goldfields. An estimated 60 to 80 percent of these newcomers came from the United States and most had no experience in the mining industry. (Note: Traditional historical analysis, as outlined by George Fetherling, has suggested around 80 percent were US citizens or recent immigrants to America. The 1898 census data suggests that 63 percent of Dawson City inhabitants at the time were American citizens, with 32 percent Canadian or British. As Charlene Porsild has described, however, the census data for the period is inconsistent in how it asked questions about citizenship and place of birth. Porsild argues that the level of participation from those born in the US, as opposed to recent immigrants or temporary residents, may have been as low as 43 percent, with Canadian and British born members of the gold rush in the majority.) Constantine moved quickly to establish a base in the Klondike in 1896, but the small detachment soon became overwhelmed and requested urgent reinforcements from the east. Encouraged by a sense that the organisation now had a new challenge and an opportunity to turn around the criticism of the 1885 North-West Rebellion, by 1897, 96 members of the NWMP had been sent to the district and by 1898 this had increased to 288, an expensive commitment for the Canadian government and over a third of the entire NWMP, including its most experienced personnel.

The borders in south-east Alaska were disputed between the United States, Canada and Britain since the American purchase of Alaska from Russia in 1867. There were concerns that the United States might annex the Klondike and the NWMP were tasked to assert Canadian control over the borders. The NWMP set up control posts at the borders of the Yukon Territory or, where these was disputed, at easily controlled mountain passes, equipping these with Maxim guns. NWMP detectives were used to infiltrate American organisations to monitor potential conspiracies. The NWMP enforced new rules requiring that travellers bring a year's supply of food with them to be allowed into the Yukon, checked for illegal weapons, prevented the entry of criminals and collected customs duties. The NWMP also helped protect and guide the flow of migrants, evacuating many in late 1897 when food in the Yukon ran out, managing their safety en route, mediating in their disputes and providing practical advice.

The NWMP played a major part in both law enforcement during the gold rush, managing the boom town of Dawson City and patrolling out across the Yukon Territory using a network of 33 posts. Their efforts to curb criminality were largely successful: in 1898, for example, there were no murders and only a few major thefts. Of 150 arrests for serious offences that year, over half were for prostitution and resulted from an attempt by the NWMP to regulate the sex industry, which included regular arrests and medical inspections. The laws on the consumption of liquor were also strictly enforced, and the police intervened to prevent alcohol being sold to the local Indians. The police's role in running the civil services went much further, however, to encompass fire safety, the management of local game, operating the postal and telegraph system, acting as coroners, providing social support and, in the early days, running the mining registration system. Zaslow has described the Yukon as effectively "a police state" during this period, and Morrison notes their paternalistic willingness to invent non-existent laws when they considered it necessary. The NWMP acted efficiently and with probity during the period, although their task was helped by the geography of the Klondike, which made it relatively easy to bar entry to undesirables or prevent suspects from leaving the region.

When the force deployed to the Yukon, however, it discovered that labourers were earning up to ten times as much as a constable, even with hardship pay included, leading to serious morale and retention problems.

== Mackenzie Delta and Hudson's Bay ==
In 1903, the police were sent to the Mackenzie Delta and then to the west coast of Hudson Bay. Near the Mackenzie Delta, in the Beaufort Sea, on Herschel Island, concerns were raised over the possible sexual abuse of the local Inuit by the transient American whaling community. There were also fears that the United States might attempt to assert sovereignty over the Mackenzie Delta region. Constantine led an expedition in 1903 to set up a base in Fort McPherson, which was owned by the Hudson's Bay Company. Sergeant Fitzgerald and a constable reached the remote Herschel Island itself in August, living in a sod house provided by the whalers. The police found no evidence of the Inuit being sexually abused by the whalers, but attempted to clamp down on liquor sales to the Inuit community and collect customs duties. Inuit, who were not covered by the existing Indian laws, were treated "leniently and with restraint".

There was a well-publicised expedition to Hudson Bay, led by Superintendent John D. Moodie on the schooner Neptune. The purpose was to establish a police presence on the western shore of the bay. There were logistical problems with extending the police presence across the region, requiring the creation of posts and the acquisition of a steamer to move supplies. The conditions were very harsh, particularly when deliveries of supplies were delayed. By 1907, the police were struggling to maintain the posts in the difficult conditions. Morrison: "progress was slow and uncertain". Work on a railroad to Hudson Bay began in 1908, and continued for two decades, requiring substantial police assistance. As the railroad progressed, it gradually eased the logistics around the bay. As the railroad extended further, the NWMP were able to carry out various long patrols deep into the interior. And by 1910, police activity spread northwards helped by the reduced costs of transport. Temporary detachments began to open at York Factory in 1912, and then in 1913 at Port Nelson, where the police established their divisional headquarters. By 1915–16, there were patrols up to Baker Lake and Coppermine River.

Indians in the north typically had prior experience with Europeans, such as with fur traders, and there was little conflict between the police and the native populations. Yet, police were not popular with the Indians, and often blamed them for government policies, such as the pass system. The Indians committed very few crimes. As for the Inuit, the force generally took a more liberal, paternalistic attitude towards them, often applying informal justice rather than official laws when the occasional Inuit crime was committed. As with the Indians in the north, few crimes were committed by the Inuit.

== See also ==
- March West
- North-West Mounted Police during the North-West Rebellion
- Royal Canadian Mounted Police

== Bibliography ==
- Allen, Douglas W. (2007). "Information Sharing During the Klondike Gold Rush". The Journal of Economic History. 67 (4): 1–24. doi:10.1017/S0022050707000459. S2CID 154301382.
- Atkin, Ronald (1973). Maintain the Right: The Early History of the North West Mounted Police, 1873-1900. London, UK and Basingstoke, UK: Macmillan. ISBN 9780333122822.
- Backhouse, Frances (1995). Women of the Klondike. Vancouver, Canada: Whitecap Books. ISBN 978-1-55110-375-4.
- Berton, Pierre (2001). Klondike: The Last Great Gold Rush 1896–1899. Toronto, Canada: Anchor Canada. ISBN 0-385-65844-3.
- Coates, Ken (1994). "Introduction". In Adney, Tappan (ed.). The Klondike Stampede. Vancouver, Canada: University of British Columbia Press. ISBN 0-7748-0489-0.
- Fetherling, George (1997). The Gold Crusades: A Social History of Gold Rushes, 1849–1929. Toronto, Canada: University of Toronto Press. ISBN 978-0-8020-8046-2.
- Gates, Michael (1997). Gold at Fortymile Creek: Early Days in the Yukon. Vancouver, Canada: University of British Columbia Press. ISBN 9780774804929.
- Macleod, R. C. (1976). The North-West Mounted Police and Law Enforcement, 1873-1905. Toronto, Canada and Buffalo, US: University of Toronto Press. ISBN 0802053335.
- Morrison, William Robert (1974). "The North-West Mounted Police and the Klondike Gold Rush". Journal of Contemporary History. 9 (2): 93–105. doi:10.1177/002200947400900204. S2CID 159897122.
- Morrison, William Robert (1985). Showing the Flag: The Mounted Police and Canadian Sovereignty in the North, 1894–1925. Vancouver, Canada: University of British Columbia Press. ISBN 978-0-7748-0245-1.
- Porsild, Charlene (1998). Gamblers and Dreamers: Women, Men, and Community in the Klondike. Vancouver, Canada: University of British Columbia Press. ISBN 0-7748-0650-8.
- Winslow, Kathryn (1952). Big Pan-Out: The Klondike Story. London, UK: Phoenix House Ltd. OCLC 465425340.
- Wright, Allen A. (1976). Prelude to Bonanza: The Discovery and Exploration of the Yukon. Sidney, Canada: Gray's Publishing. ISBN 0888260628.
- Zaslow, Morris (1971). The Opening of the Canadian North, 1870-1914. Toronto, Canada: McClelland and Steward. ISBN 0771090803.
