= Angus Claude Macdonell =

Canadian politician

The Honourable Angus Claude Macdonell
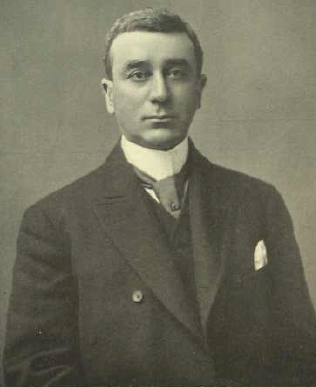

Canadian Senator from Ontario
- In office August 1, 1917 – November 1921
- Appointed by: Robert Borden
- Succeeded by: Archibald Hayes Macdonell

Member of Parliament for Toronto South
- In office 1904–1917
- Preceded by: The electoral district was created in 1903.
- Succeeded by: Charles Sheard

Personal details
- Born: June 23, 1861 Toronto, Canada West
- Died: April 18, 1924 (aged 62)
- Party: Conservative
- Relations: Archibald Hayes Macdonell, brother

Angus Claude Macdonell (June 23, 1861 – April 18, 1924) was a Canadian lawyer and politician.

== Background ==
Born in Toronto, Canada West, Macdonell received a Bachelor of Civil Law degree in 1886 from Trinity College, Toronto and a D.C.L. degree in 1902. He was called to the Bar of Ontario in 1886. He was elected to the House of Commons of Canada for Toronto South in the 1904 federal election. A Conservative, he was re-elected in 1908 and 1911. He was summoned to the Senate of Canada representing the senatorial division of Toronto South, Ontario in 1917 on the advice of Robert Borden. He served until resigning in November 1921.
