= Toronto South (federal electoral district) =

Former federal electoral district in Ontario, Canada

Ontario electoral district
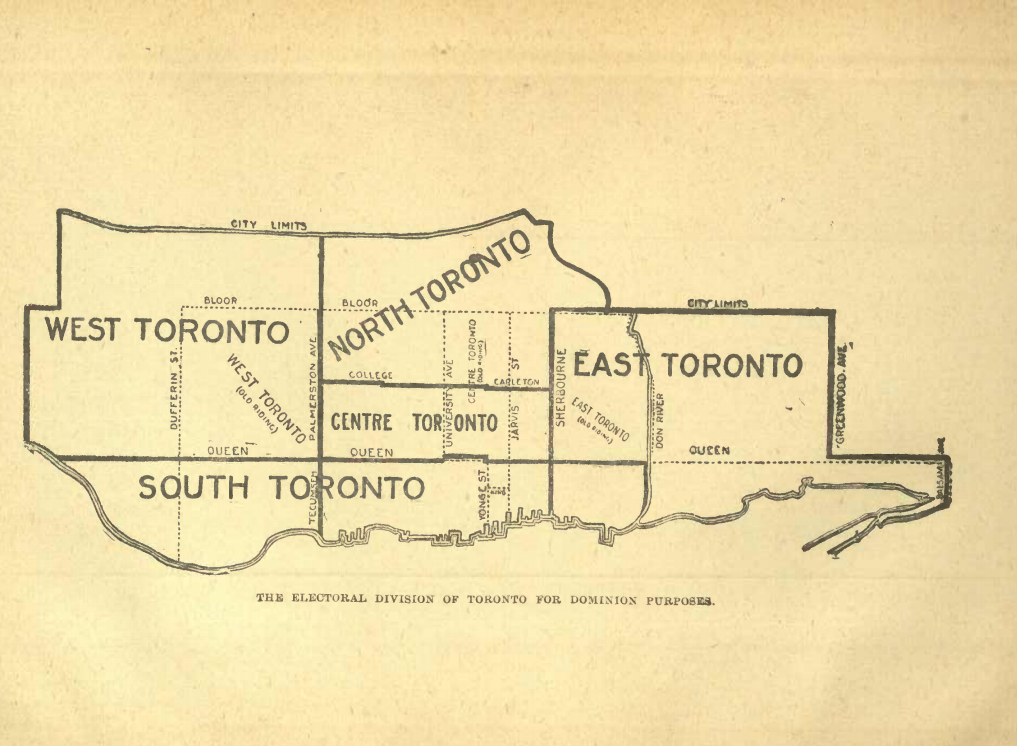
- A map of the Toronto ridings of 1904

Defunct federal electoral district
- Legislature: House of Commons
- District created: 1903
- District abolished: 1933
- First contested: 1904
- Last contested: 1930

Toronto South was a federal electoral district represented in the House of Commons of Canada from 2 September 1904 to 13 August 1935. It was located in the city of Toronto in the province of Ontario. This riding was first created in 1903 from parts of Toronto Centre, Toronto East, West Toronto and York East ridings.

It initially consisted of the portion of the city of Toronto, including Toronto Island, lying west of the River Don and south of Queen Street. In 1924, it was redefined to consist of the part of the city of Toronto south of Dundas Street, west of Jarvis Street, and east of Atlantic Avenue and Dovercourt Road, together with Toronto Island.

The electoral district was abolished in 1933 when it was redistributed between Spadina, St. Paul's and Trinity ridings.

== Members of Parliament ==
This riding has elected the following members of Parliament:

Parliament	Years	Member	Party
Riding created from Toronto Centre, Toronto East, West Toronto and York East
10th	1904–1908	Angus Claude Macdonell	Conservative
11th	1908–1911	Angus Claude Macdonell	Conservative
12th	1911–1917	Angus Claude Macdonell	Conservative
13th	1917–1921	Charles Sheard	Government (Unionist)
14th	1921–1925	Charles Sheard	Conservative
15th	1925–1926	George Reginald Geary	Conservative
16th	1926–1930	George Reginald Geary	Conservative
17th	1930–1935	George Reginald Geary	Conservative
Riding dissolved into Spadina, St. Paul's and Trinity

== Election history ==
1904 Canadian federal election: Toronto South
Party	Candidate	Votes	%	±%
Conservative	A. C. Macdonell	3,501		
Liberal	H. H. Dewart	3,092		

1908 Canadian federal election: Toronto South
Party	Candidate	Votes	%	±%
Conservative	A. C. Macdonell	2,771		
Labour	John G. O'Donoghue	1,722		

1911 Canadian federal election: Toronto South
Party	Candidate	Votes	%	±%
Conservative	A. C. Macdonell	4,473		
Liberal	John Joseph Ward	2,110		

1917 Canadian federal election: Toronto South
Party	Candidate	Votes	%	±%
Government	Charles Sheard	7,469		
Opposition–Labour	David Arthur Carey	2,365		

1921 Canadian federal election: Toronto South
Party	Candidate	Votes	%	±%
Conservative	Charles Sheard	4,056		
Liberal	James Murdock	3,475		

1925 Canadian federal election: Toronto South
Party	Candidate	Votes	%	±%
Conservative	George Reginald Geary	5,895		
Liberal	Claude Bereford Pearce	2,442		
Independent	Norman Charles McEachren	289		

1926 Canadian federal election: Toronto South
Party	Candidate	Votes	%	±%
Conservative	George Reginald Geary	4,909		
Liberal	Thomas Henry Shipway	1,606		

1930 Canadian federal election: Toronto South
Party	Candidate	Votes	%	±%
Conservative	George Reginald Geary	4,635		
Liberal	Adam Gordon McIntyre	2,244		
Labour	Jacob Romer	730		

== See also ==
- List of Canadian electoral districts
- Historical federal electoral districts of Canada
