= 2nd Regiment, Royal Canadian Horse Artillery =

- Active: 7 August 1950–Present
- Country: Canada
- Branch: Canadian Army
- Type: Horse Artillery
- Role: Artillery
- Size: Regiment
- Part of: Royal Canadian Horse Artillery; 25th Canadian Infantry Brigade (1951-1952); 2 Canadian Mechanized Brigade Group (1995-2026); 1st Canadian Artillery Brigade (2026-Present)
- Garrison/HQ: CFB Petawawa
- Mottos: Ubique (Latin for 'everywhere'); Quo fas et gloria ducunt (Latin for 'whither right and glory lead')
- March: Slow march: "Royal Artillery Slow March"; Quick march: "British Grenadiers"; Trot past: "Keel Row"; Gallop past: "Bonnie Dundee"
- Engagements: Korean War; Bosnian War: Operation Palladium; War in Afghanistan: Operation Medusa
- Battle honours: The word Ubique (Latin for 'everywhere') takes the place of all past and future battle honours in recognition of the artillery's widespread service in all battles and campaigns since its creation

Commanders
- Current commander: Lieutenant-Colonel B.C. Insley, CD

The 2nd Regiment, Royal Canadian Horse Artillery is a regular artillery regiment of the Canadian Army. It is based at CFB Petawawa. It was attached to 4th Canadian Division's 2 Canadian Mechanized Brigade Group. In September 2026 with the restructuring of the Canadian Armed Forces, the regiment was attached to the 1st Canadian Artillery Brigade of the 1st Canadian Division.

== Batteries ==
- D Battery (howitzer)
- E Battery (howitzer)
- F Battery (surveillance and target acquisition)
- Y Battery (observer)
- Headquarters and Services Battery

== History ==
=== Korean War ===
2 RCHA formed on 7 August 1950 as part of Canadian Army Special Force for United Nations mission in the Korean War. From May 1951 to May 1952, 2 RCHA served in Korea as part of the 25th Canadian Infantry Brigade, 1st Commonwealth Division.

=== Bosnia ===
2 RCHA deployed to Bosnia as part of Operation Palladium as part of the United Nations Protection Force (UNPROFOR).

=== Afghanistan ===
2 RCHA deployed 5 times during the War in Afghanistan from 2003–2010, participating in Operation Medusa, where the regiment shot over 2,000 rounds of artillery in about 2 weeks.

== Commandants ==
The regiment has had the following commandants.

Name	Year	Significance	Photo
Lieutenant-Colonel (Brigadier-General) A.J. Bailey, DSO, OBE, ED, CD	1950–1951	First Commandant of 2 RCHA; Director of Royal Canadian Artillery (Aug 54 – Aug 57)	
Lieutenant-Colonel (Colonel) E.G. Brooks, DSO, OBE, CD	1951–1953	Director of Royal Canadian Artillery (Aug 60 – Nov 63)	Stained glass of Col E G Brooks DSO OBE CD in Currie Hall, Royal Military College of Canada
Lieutenant-Colonel R.G. Kingstone, CD	1953–1956		
Lieutenant-Colonel (Colonel) J.L. Drewry, DSO, CD	1956–1957	Director of Royal Canadian Artillery (Nov 63 – Oct 65)	
Lieutenant-Colonel J.E. Pincock, CD	1957–1959		
Lieutenant-Colonel G.N. Chambers, CD	1959–1960		
Lieutenant-Colonel (Colonel) J.P. Beer, MBE, CD	1961–1965	Director of Royal Canadian Artillery (Oct 65 – Jul 69)	
Lieutenant-Colonel W.E. Sills CD	1965–1967		
Lieutenant-Colonel J.G. Henderson CD	1967–1969		
Lieutenant-Colonel J.A. Cotter, CD	1969–1970		
Lieutenant-Colonel W.R. Dawes, CD	1970–1972		
Lieutenant-Colonel H.R. Wheatley, CD	1972–1974		
Lieutenant-Colonel D.E. Stothers, CD	1974–1976		
Lieutenant-Colonel J.C. Fleming, CD	1976–1978		
Lieutenant-Colonel C.J. Mialkowski, CD	1978–1980		
Lieutenant-Colonel M.C. Brown, CD	1980–1982		
Lieutenant-Colonel (Brigadier-General) Ernest Beno, OMM, CD	1982–1984	Became Colonel Commandant, The Royal Regiment of Canadian Artillery (2007)	
Lieutenant-Colonel R.B. Mitchell, CD	1984–1986		
Lieutenant-Colonel (Colonel) Joseph D. Briscoe, OMM, CD	1986–1988		
Lieutenant-Colonel K.C. Hague, CD	1988–1990		
Lieutenant-Colonel D.L. Ross, CD	1990–1992		
Lieutenant-Colonel D.M. Chupick, CD	1992–1994		
Lieutenant-Colonel (Colonel) D.D. Marshall, OMM, CD	1994–1996	Director of Royal Canadian Artillery (May 8 – May 10)	
Lieutenant-Colonel Stuart Beare, CMM, MSC, MSM, CD	1996–1998	Commander Canadian Joint Operations Command; Commander of the Multinational Brigade Northwest of the NATO Stabilization Force in Bosnia-Herzegovina (Sept 03 – Sept 04)	
Lieutenant-Colonel R.G. Davis, CD	1998–2000		
Lieutenant-Colonel (Colonel) John David Ernest Crosman, CD	2000–2002		
Lieutenant-Colonel (Brigadier-General) Kevin R. Cotten, OMM, CD	2002–2003	Commandant of the Canadian Forces College	
Lieutenant-Colonel (Major-General) Simon Charles Hetherington, OMM, MSC, CD	2003–2006	Commander Canadian Army Doctrine and Training Centre Headquarters; Commander 3rd Canadian Division / Joint Task Force West	General S.C. Hetherington speaking at a ceremony in Kabul, Afghanistan
Lieutenant-Colonel LCol S.A.A. Johnson, CD	2006–2007		
Lieutenant-Colonel (Colonel) L.C. Dalton, CD	2007–2009	Director of Royal Canadian Artillery (Feb 12 – Mar 14)	
Lieutenant-Colonel (Brigadier-General) L.P. McGarry, MSM, CD	2009–2010		
Lieutenant-Colonel (Colonel) G.W. Ivey, MSM, CD	2010–2013		
Lieutenant-Colonel D. Bobbitt, CD	2013–2014		
Lieutenant-Colonel (Brigadier-General) S.T. Hatton, MSM, CD	2014–2016	Canadian Army Doctrine and Training Centre Headquarters; Director of Royal Canadian Artillery (Aug 19 – May 21)	
Lieutenant-Colonel (Colonel) J.G. Hampton, CD	2016–2018		
Lieutenant-Colonel D.R. Matheson, CD	2018–2020		
Lieutenant-Colonel (Colonel) S.A. Heer, MSM, CD	2020–2022		
Lieutenant-Colonel J.D. Flanders, MSM, CD	2022–2024		LCol Flanders (left) at the funeral of Queen Elizabeth II
Lieutenant-Colonel B.C. Insley, CD	2024–		

== Freedoms ==
The regiment has received the freedom of several locations throughout its history; these include:

- 1983: Kingston, Ontario.
- 1987: Cobourg, Ontario.

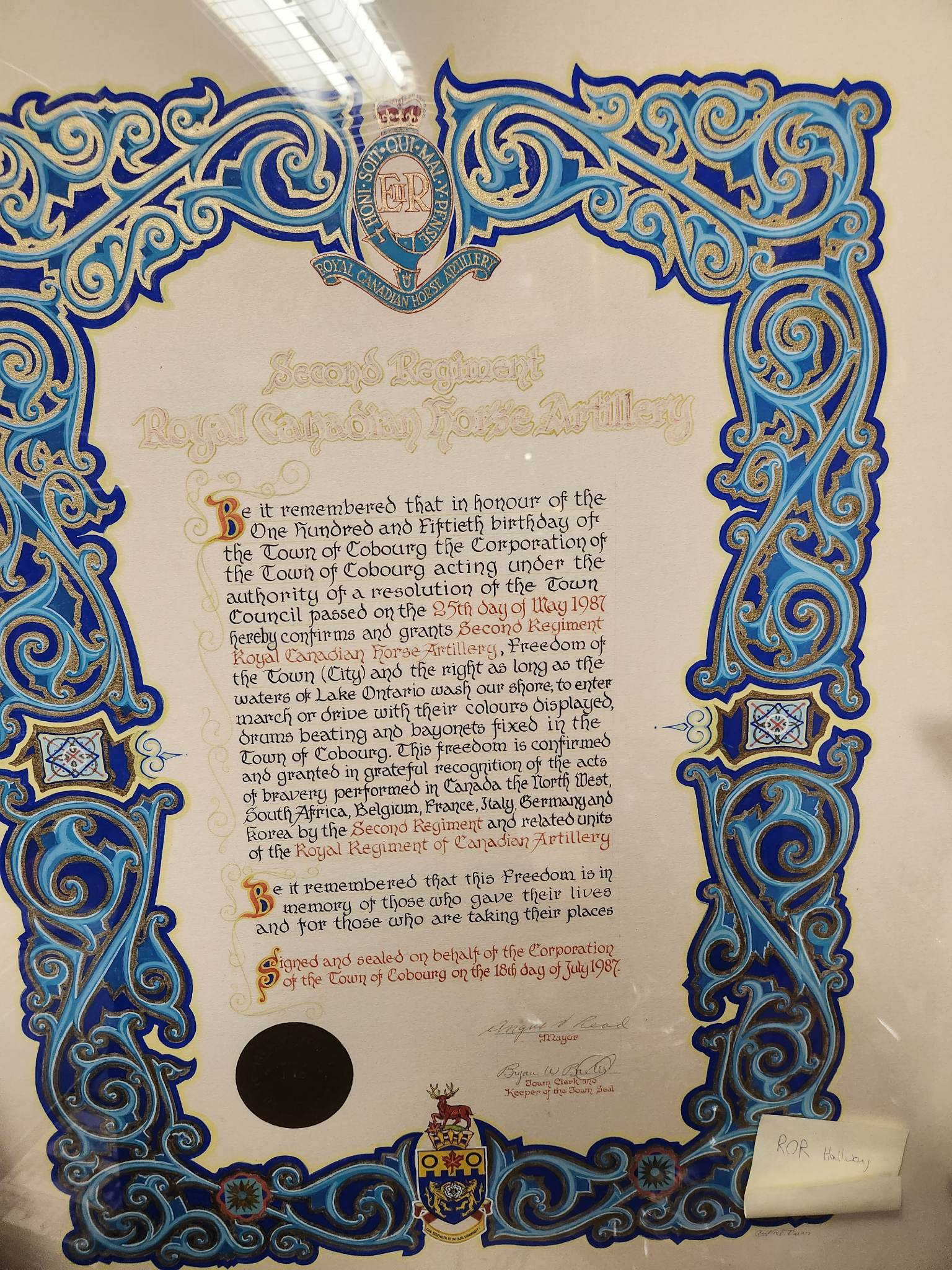
2 RCHA Freedom of the City, Cobourg, 1987
