= Simon Charles Hetherington =

Canadian Army officer

- Born: Oakville, Ontario
- Military career
- Allegiance: Canada
- Branch: Canadian Army
- Service years: –2019
- Rank: Major-general
- Commands: 2nd Regiment, Royal Canadian Horse Artillery; 3rd Canadian Division
- Conflicts: UNFICYP Yugoslav Wars: NATO intervention in Bosnia and Herzegovina; War in Afghanistan
- Awards: Order of Military Merit; Meritorious Service Cross; Canadian Forces' Decoration

Major-General Simon Charles Hetherington, OMM, MSC, CD was a Canadian Army officer who served as the commander of the Canadian Army Doctrine and Training Centre, 3rd Canadian Division, and the 2nd Regiment, Royal Canadian Horse Artillery.

== Military career ==
He served in Afghanistan on multiple tours where he would command the Kandahar Provincial Reconstruction Team (KPRT) and as the deputy commander of Joint Task Force Afghanistan.

He was made the commander of the 3rd Canadian Division based out of Edmonton in 2016.

In 2017, he was promoted to Major-General and was made the commander of the Canadian Army Doctrine and Training Centre.
