= Stuart Beare =

- Born: Shilo, Manitoba
- Military career
- Allegiance: Canada
- Branch: Canadian Army
- Service years: 1978–2014
- Rank: Lieutenant-general
- Commands: Canadian Joint Operations Command; Canadian Expeditionary Force Command; Deputy Commander of the military police within the NATO Training Mission in Afghanistan; Multinational Brigade Northwest of the NATO Stabilization Force in Bosnia-Herzegovina; 2nd Regiment, Royal Canadian Horse Artillery
- Conflicts: UNFICYP Yugoslav Wars: NATO intervention in Bosnia and Herzegovina; War in Afghanistan
- Awards: Order of Military Merit; Meritorious Service Cross; Meritorious Service Medal; Canadian Forces' Decoration

Lieutenant-General Stuart Beare, CMM, MSC, MSM, CD is a retired Canadian Army officer who served as the commander of Canadian Joint Operations Command, Canadian Expeditionary Force Command, Deputy commander of the military police within the NATO Training Mission in Afghanistan, Commander of the Multinational Brigade Northwest of the NATO Stabilization Force in Bosnia-Herzegovina and Commanding Officer of the 2nd Regiment, Royal Canadian Horse Artillery.

== Military career ==
He served in Germany, Cyprus, Yugoslavia, and Afghanistan on multiple tours. From 1996 to 1998 he was Commanding Officer of the 2nd Regiment, Royal Canadian Horse Artillery. From September 2003 to September 2004, He commanded the Multinational Brigade Northwest of the NATO Stabilization Force in Bosnia-Herzegovina. From June 2010 to July 2011 he was the Deputy commander of the military police within the NATO Training Mission in Afghanistan. He later became the Commander of Canadian Expeditionary Force Command, later Commanding Canadian Joint Operations Command after a merger of 3 different commands in 2012.

In 2014, he retired from the Canadian Armed Forces.

He was the Honorary Lieutenant Colonel for the 2nd Field Regiment, Royal Canadian Artillery. He was appointed Colonel Commandant of the Intelligence Branch and the Canadian Intelligence Corps on 25 September 2024. He is also the chair of the board for Soldiers Helping Soldiers, a non-for-profit helping homeless veterans, sits on the Canadian Red Cross government relations advisory committee, and is a strategic advisor for defence and public safety with Accenture Canada.
