= Charles Francis Constantine =

Canadian General

Major General Charles Francis Constantine CB DSO ADC
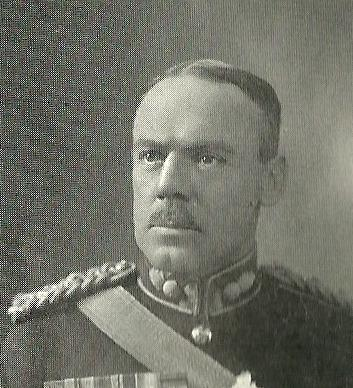

Personal details
- Born: 21 October 1883 Winnipeg, Manitoba, Canada
- Died: 20 October 1954 (aged 70) Kingston, Ontario, Canada
- Education: Royal Military College of Canada
- Profession: Soldier
- Awards: Order of the Bath

Military service
- Allegiance: Canada
- Branch/service: Royal Canadian Horse Artillery
- Years of service: 1905-1943
- Rank: Major General
- Commands: Royal Canadian Horse Artillery, Royal Military College of Canada

Major-General Charles Francis Constantine CB DSO ADC (21 October 1883 – 20 October 1954) was a Canadian General and commandant of the Royal Military College of Canada from 1925 to 1930.

== Early life and education ==
He was born in Winnipeg, Manitoba in 1883. His father, Charles Constantine, was the superintendent of the Royal North-West Mounted Police; his mother was Henrietta Anne Constantine. He was educated at Upper Canada College, in Toronto, Ontario (1896–1902). He studied at the Royal Military College of Canada (or RMC), with the student number 621 in Kingston, Ontario 1902-1905. He was an outstanding athlete and CSM. He played Rugby for two of the leading British teams, Blackheath F.C. and Harlequin F.C. Whilst based in Quebec City in 1906 and 1907 he played senior hockey with the Quebec Hockey Club. He was successful, and was their leading scorers with 15 goals in 7 games. He was the XI Commandant, RMC.

== Military career ==
Often referred to as a soldier's soldier, Constantine spent his life in the army from the time he joined the Royal Canadian Horse Artillery (or RCHA) in 1905, until he retired in 1943. He entered the Permanent Force in 1905.

By the time that the First World War broke out, he had become a captain. He was appointed brigade major shortly after proceeding oversees with the 1st Canadian Division. He was promoted to lieutenant colonel just before the Battle of Vimy Ridge in 1917 and placed in command of the 5th Canadian Field Brigade. He rose to the command of an Artillery Brigade, winning the Distinguished Service Order, or DSO, and bar and the Legion of Honour. He was made a Companion of the Order of the Bath, or CB.

After the war he held many important military posts, including O.C. of the Royal Canadian Horse Artillery. Following the First World War, he taught at the RMC then went to staff college in England.

He was appointed the 11th Commandant at the RMC (1925–30). During this period he consolidated the work of restoring it after the damages caused by the war. In 1925, Constantine was informed that the Department of Militia intended to expand the RMC over the next ten years so that it could handle three hundred cadets, a seven-month physical training course for officers and other ranks, equitation courses and special courses for the military training of officers of the Royal Canadian Navy, the Active Militia and the Royal Canadian Air Force. Summer training and accommodation was provided at the RMC for cadets who were candidates for the Permanent Force, the Royal Canadian Navy and the Royal Canadian Air Force.

To accommodate the growth of the college, a new mechanical engineering shop was built and equipped to release the space under Currie Hall for a drafting room. Although he also recommended plans for the construction of dormitory, mess and recreation facilities, the accommodation problem was not immediately resolved. The universities and professional societies, such as the Institute of Chartered Accountants of Ontario continued to recognize RMC courses and several members of the academic staff took measures to improve their academic qualifications. Although the Advisory Board recommended that RMC offer a bachelor of military science degree or that civilian universities give a special bachelor of military science degree to RMC graduates who completed their degrees in civilian universities, the proposal was coldly received by the Deputy Minister and Chief of the General Staff. Although some ex-cadets recommended the addition of more humanities and cultural courses, specialization was eliminated. All cadets took the same subjects with a heavy emphasis on mathematics, with the exception of third year specialization in chemical engineering 1924-29. During the 20s, between one quarter and a half of each RMC class went into regular military service in Canada or in Britain, particularly into the Canadian technical corps, the signals and the engineers. The Constantine Arena was named in Major-General Constantine's honour, who in addition to his distinguished service career was an outstanding sportsman, hockey player and coach at the RMC. The arena was built in 1960 during a period of rapid expansion of the RMC.

After leaving RMC, he served as district officer commanding at Saint John, New Brunswick (1930). In 1934, he became adjutant-general in Ottawa, Ontario. In 1938, he was the commanding officer of Kingston Ontario, Canada's largest military district. With the advent of war in 1939, he was sent to Halifax, Nova Scotia.

He died in Kingston, Ontario, the day before his 71st birthday.

== Family ==
His wife, Marie, served as the Provincial Commissioner with the Girl Guides of Canada from 1937–40. They had three children, all girls.

== Honour ==
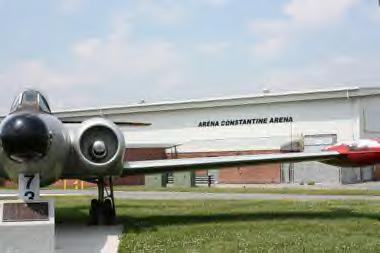
Royal Military College of Canada Constantine Arena

The Constantine arena at the Royal Military College of Canada was named in honour of Charles Francis Constantine in 1960.

=== Books ===
- 4237 Dr. Adrian Preston & Peter Dennis (Edited) "Swords and Covenants" Rowman And Littlefield, London. Croom Helm. 1976.
- H16511 Dr. Richard Arthur Preston "Canada's RMC - A History of Royal Military College" Second Edition 1982
- H1877 R. Guy C. Smith (editor) "As You Were! Ex-Cadets Remember". In 2 Volumes. Volume I: 1876-1918. Volume II: 1919-1984. RMC. Kingston, Ontario. The R.M.C. Club of Canada. 1984
- Chandler B. Beach, Frank Morton McMurry and others. "The New Student's Reference Work: Volume 3" F. E. Compton And Company, 1911

Academic offices
Preceded by William Henry Pferinger Elkins	Commandant of the Royal Military College of Canada; 1925-1930	Succeeded by Sir Archibald Macdonell
