= John Willoughby Crawford =

Canadian politician

The Honourable John Willoughby Crawford QC
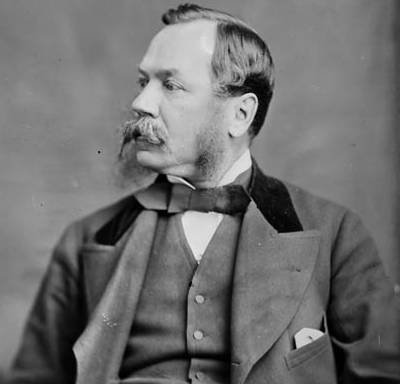

3rd Lieutenant Governor of Ontario
- In office 12 November 1873 – 13 May 1875
- Monarch: Victoria
- Governor General: The Earl of Dufferin
- Premier: Oliver Mowat
- Preceded by: William Pearce Howland
- Succeeded by: Donald Alexander Macdonald

Member of the Canadian Parliament for Leeds South
- In office 1867–1872
- Succeeded by: Albert Norton Richards

Member of the Canadian Parliament for West Toronto
- In office 1872 – 4 November 1873
- Preceded by: Robert Alexander Harrison
- Succeeded by: Thomas Moss

Member of the Legislative Assembly of the Province of Canada for East Toronto
- In office 1861–1863
- Preceded by: Amos Wright
- Succeeded by: Alexander Mortimer Smith

Personal details
- Born: 26 August 1817 Manorhamilton, County Leitrim, Ireland
- Died: 13 May 1875 (aged 57) Toronto, Ontario
- Party: Conservative

John Willoughby Crawford QC (1817 – 13 May 1875) was a Canadian politician who served as the third Lieutenant Governor of Ontario from 1873 to 1875.

== Life ==
Born in 1817 in Manorhamilton, County Leitrim, Ireland, the son of George Crawford, John Crawford came to Upper Canada as a child when his family settled in Brockville. He married Helen Sherwood of York, Upper Canada (Toronto). A lawyer by profession, Crawford served as president of the Royal Canadian Bank and was solicitor for the Grand Trunk Railway. In 1867, he was appointed Queen's Counsel. He also became president of the Toronto and Nipissing Railway in 1868 and also served as a director of the Toronto, Grey and Bruce Railway.

Crawford was member of the Legislative Assembly of the Province of Canada for East Toronto from 1861 to 1863. He then served as a House of Commons of Canada from 1867 to 1873, and supported representation by population. On the day his government resigned in 1873, The Right Honourable Sir John A. Macdonald appointed Crawford Lieutenant Governor of Ontario.

In the months leading to his death, Crawford's health was poor. following several months of ill health. He died on 13 May 1875 at Government House, his official residence. His funeral service was conducted at St. James Cathedral with interment at a vault belonging to his wife's family.

== Electoral history ==
1867 Canadian federal election: Leeds South
| Party | Candidate | Votes | % |
|---|---|---|---|
| Conservative | John Willoughby Crawford | 1,393 | 50.53 |
| Liberal | Albert Norton Richards | 1,364 | 49.47 |

Government offices
| Preceded by William Pearce Howland | Lieutenant Governor of Ontario; 1873–1875 | Succeeded by Donald Alexander Macdonald |
