= Toronto West (federal electoral district) =

Former federal electoral district in Ontario, Canada

Ontario electoral district
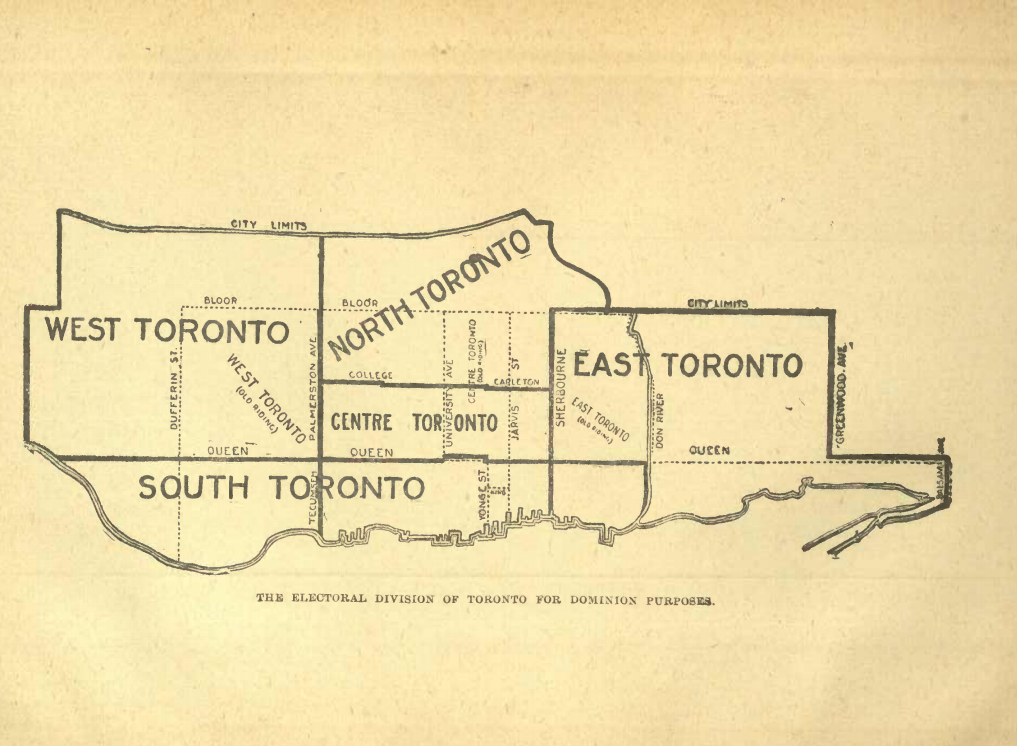
- A map of the Toronto ridings of 1904

Defunct federal electoral district
- Legislature: House of Commons
- District created: 1867
- District abolished: 1924
- First contested: 1867
- Last contested: 1921

Toronto West, initially named West Toronto, was a federal electoral district in the City of Toronto, Ontario, Canada, that was represented in the House of Commons of Canada from 1867 to 1925.

== Territorial evolution ==
Prior to Confederation, the City of Toronto was divided into two electoral divisions in 1860 along Yonge Street. The west riding, contested in the 1861 and 1863 Province of Canada elections, consisted of St. George's, St. Andrew's, St. Patrick's (three of the five original Toronto city wards) and St. John's (created in 1853 out of St Patrick's) wards of the City of Toronto. The two electoral divisions were adopted by the British North America Act, 1867 for the city, and were contested when the first dominion (federal) election and the first local (provincial) election were held concurrently in 1867.

In 1872, St. John's ward was redistributed from West Toronto to Centre Toronto when Toronto gained a third House of Commons seat. In 1892, West Toronto was given an additional seat in the House of Commons. In the elections held in 1896 and 1900, the district returned two members using plurality block voting.

In 1903, the electoral district was renamed Toronto West. The portion of West Toronto laying south of Queen Street was redistributed to Toronto South, and representation was reduced back to one member.

In 1914, the new district of Parkdale was created out of Toronto West, leaving Toronto West with a substantially reduced area bounded by Queen Street West, Spadina Avenue, Bloor Street West and Dovercourt Road.

The electoral district was abolished in 1924 when it was redistributed to Toronto South and Toronto West Centre ridings.

== Boundaries ==
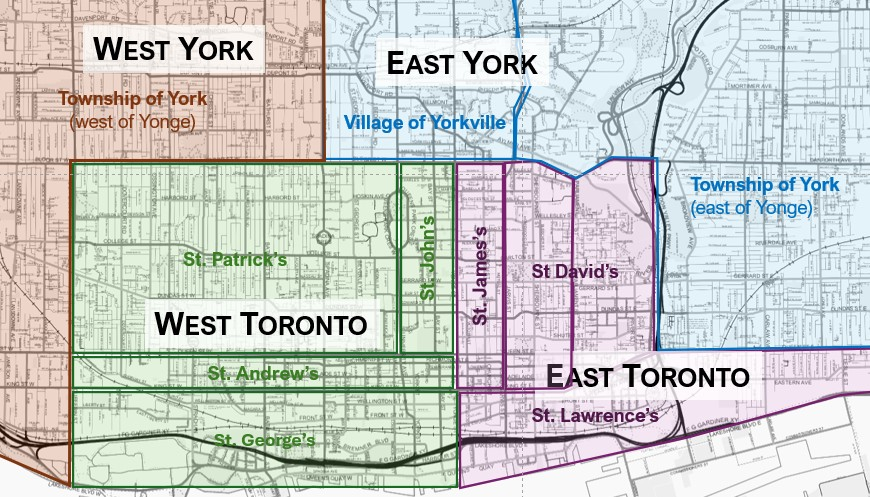
1860-1872

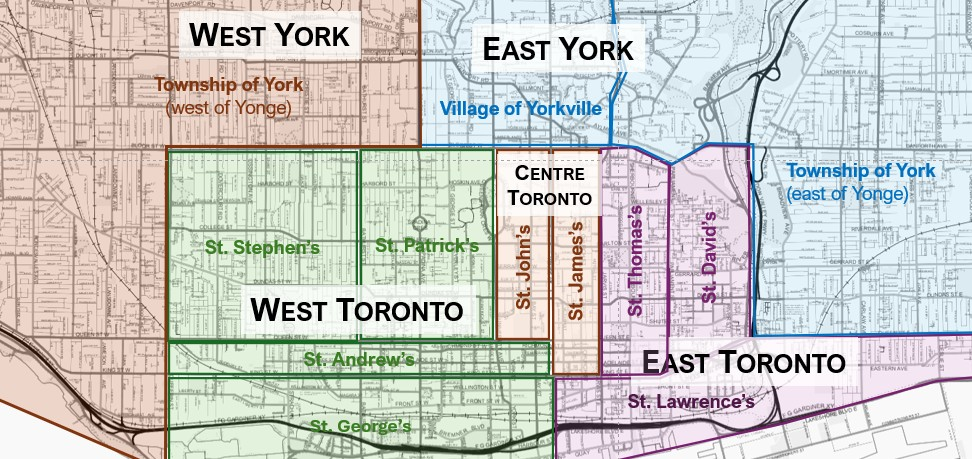
1872-1904

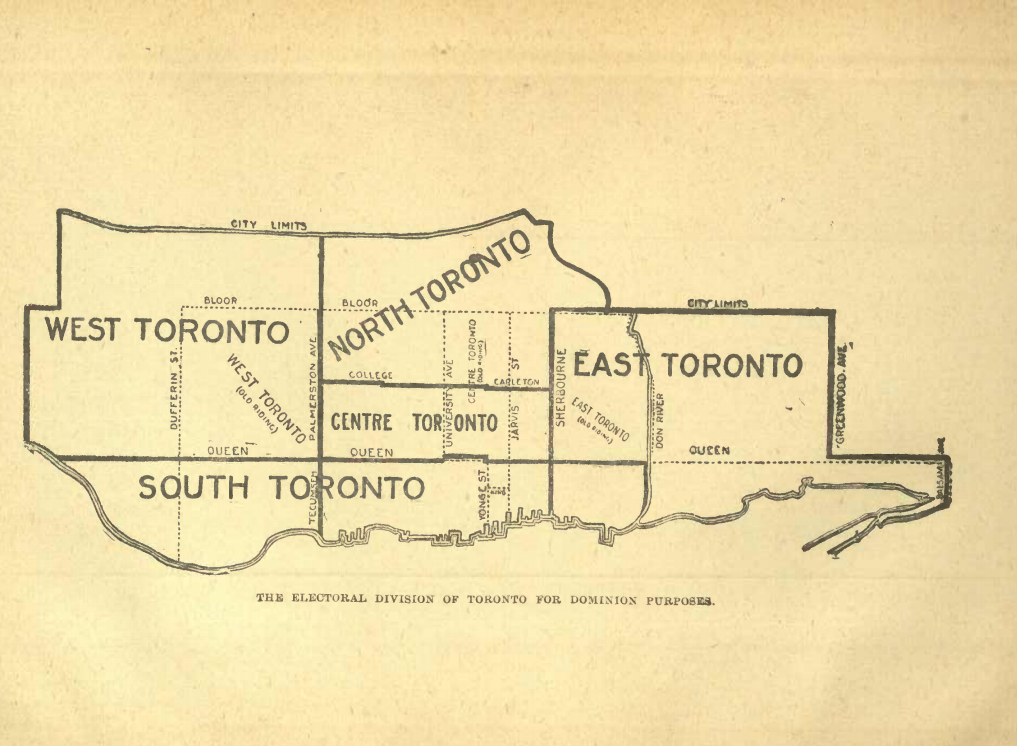
1904–1917

== Members of Parliament ==
Toronto West was represented in the final two parliaments of the Legislative Assembly of the Province of Canada:

Parliament	Years	Member	Party
Legislative Assembly of the Province of Canada; Created from the electoral division of Toronto; West Toronto
7th	1861–1863	John Beverley Robinson	Conservative
8th	1863–1867	John Macdonald	Reformer

Upon confederation, Toronto West has elected the following members of parliament:

Parliament	Years	Member	Party
Continued as an existing electoral division from Province of Canada; West Toronto
1st	1867–1872	Robert Alexander Harrison	Conservative
2nd	1872–1873	John Willoughby Crawford	Conservative
2nd	1873–1874	Thomas Moss	Liberal
3rd	1874–1875	Thomas Moss	Liberal
3rd	1875–1878	John Beverly Robinson	Conservative
4th	1878–1880	John Beverly Robinson	Conservative
4th	1880–1882	James Beaty Jr.	Conservative
5th	1882–1887	James Beaty Jr.	Conservative
6th	1887–1891	Frederick Charles Denison	Conservative
7th	1891–1896	Frederick Charles Denison	Conservative
8th	1896–1900	Edmund Boyd Osler & Edward F. Clarke	Conservative
9th	1900–1904	Edmund Boyd Osler & Edward F. Clarke	Conservative
Toronto West
10th	1904–1908	Edmund Boyd Osler	Conservative
11th	1908–1911	Edmund Boyd Osler	Conservative
12th	1911–1917	Edmund Boyd Osler	Conservative
13th	1917–1921	Horatio Clarence Hocken	Government (Unionist)
14th	1921–1925	Horatio Clarence Hocken	Conservative
Riding dissolved into Toronto West Centre and Toronto South

Toronto being a former capital of Upper Canada and the United Province of Canada, and the capital of the largest province of the new nation, it is not surprising that many of its MPs were or became figures of significant prominence. Of the nine individuals who represented Toronto West in Parliament:

- two later served as Chief Justice of Ontario - Robert Alexander Harrison (1875–78) & Thomas Moss (1878–81)
- two later served as Lieutenant Governor of Ontario - John Willoughby Crawford (1873–75) & John Beverley Robinson (1880–87)
- four served as Mayor of Toronto - John Beverley Robinson (1856), James Beaty Jr. (1879–80), Edward Frederick Clarke (1888–91), Horatio Clarence Hocken (1912–14)
- Edmund Boyd Osler was the founder and benefactor of the Royal Ontario Museum

== Election history ==
=== 1860 boundaries ===
1867 Canadian federal election
Party	Candidate	Votes
Conservative	Robert Alexander Harrison	1,477
Independent Liberal	John Macdonald	1,048

=== On 1872 boundaries ===
1872 Canadian federal election
Party	Candidate	Votes
Conservative	John Crawford	1,043
Unknown	McLellan	574
Unknown	Capreol	0

Canadian federal by-election, December 18, 1873
Party	Candidate	Votes
Liberal	Thomas Moss	acclaimed
On Mr. Crawford being appointed Lieutenant-Governor of Ontario

1874 Canadian federal election
Party	Candidate	Votes
Liberal	Thomas Moss	1,651
Conservative	John Beverly Robinson	1,440

Canadian federal by-election, November 6, 1875
Party	Candidate	Votes
Conservative	John Beverly Robinson	1,935
Unknown	John Turner	1,584
On Mr. Moss being appointed Justice of the Court of Appeal of Ontario.

1878 Canadian federal election
Party	Candidate	Votes
Conservative	John Beverly Robinson	2,165
Unknown	J. Hodgins	1,528

Canadian federal by-election, 28 August 1880
Party	Candidate	Votes
Conservative	James Beaty, Jr.	2,097
Unknown	P. Ryan	1,836
Unknown	A.W. Wright	49
Unknown	F.C. Capreol	23
On Mr. Robinson's resignation to become Lieutenant-Governor of Ontario

1882 Canadian federal election
Party	Candidate	Votes
Conservative	James Beaty, Jr.	2,714
Unknown	William Barclay McMurrich	2,283

1887 Canadian federal election
Party	Candidate	Votes
Conservative	Frederic C. Denison	3,895
Liberal	E.E. Sheppard	3,428

1891 Canadian federal election
Party	Candidate	Votes
Conservative	Frederic C. Denison	5,048
Liberal	Arthur Mowat	3,291

1896 Canadian federal election
Party	Candidate	Votes
Conservative	Edmund B. Osler	5,370
Conservative	Edward Frederick Clarke	5,147
Liberal	W.T.R. Preston	4,734
Liberal	A.T. Hunter	4,225

1900 Canadian federal election
Party	Candidate	Votes
Conservative	Edward F. Clarke	7,024
Conservative	Edmund B. Osler	6,530
Liberal	William Burns	4,713
Liberal	James D. Allan	4,547
Labour	Hugh Stevenson	1,657

=== On 1903 boundaries ===
1904 Canadian federal election
Party	Candidate	Votes	%	±%
Conservative	Edmund Boyd Osler	4,464		
Liberal	Alfred Taylour Hunter	2,573		

1908 Canadian federal election
Party	Candidate	Votes	%	±%
Conservative	Edmund Boyd Osler	4,772		
Independent	James Hunter Duthie	2,419		

1911 Canadian federal election
Party	Candidate	Votes	%	±%
Conservative	Edmund Boyd Osler	11,442		
Liberal	Gordon Waldron	3,437		

=== On 1914 boundaries ===
1917 Canadian federal election
Party	Candidate	Votes	%	±%
Government (Unionist)	Horatio Clarence Hocken	12,648		
Opposition (Laurier Liberals)	Charles Wesley Kerr	3,030		
Labour	John William Bruce	2,053		

1921 Canadian federal election
Party	Candidate	Votes	%	±%
Conservative	Horatio Clarence Hocken	5,920		
Liberal	Alfred Taylour Hunter	3,913		
Labour	Harriet Dunlop Prenter	1,741		

== See also ==
- List of Canadian electoral districts
- Historical federal electoral districts of Canada
