= Charles William Drury =

Canadian army officer (1865–1913)

Major General Charles William Drury CB

Personal details
- Profession: Soldier
- Awards: Order of the Bath

Military service
- Allegiance: Canada
- Branch/service: Royal Canadian Horse Artillery
- Years of service: 1874-1913
- Rank: Major General
- Unit: New Brunswick Garrison Artillery 'A' Battery, RCFA
- Commands: Canadian Field Brigade of Artillery; Halifax Citadel
- Battles/wars: North-West Rebellion Second Boer War

Major-General Charles William Drury CB (1856-1913) was a Canadian General often credited as the "Father of Modern Artillery in Canada" and briefly in command of the Canadian Artillery in South Africa during the Boer War.

== Early life and education ==
Drury was born in 1856 in Kingston, Ontario and was the son of Ward Chipman Drury and Charlotte Augusta Hayne, daughter of Lieutenant-Colonel R.A Hayne.

== Career ==
Drury was commissioned in January 1874 into the New Brunswick Garrison Artillery Brigade out of Saint John, New Brunswick, switching to the Regular Force in 1877

in 1885, Drury, now a Captain would command the Field Artillery of "A" Battery Royal Canadian Artillery (RCA), where he would implement forward thinking indirect fire techniques.

In 1893, Drury became the Commandant of the Royal School of Canadian Artillery, in which he would apply British Fire Discipline he learned while studying at the Imperial Institute in London. He would use these techniques and more to transform the elements of the Royal Canadian Artillery into a modern fighting force.

Drury would command the Canadian Field Brigade of Artillery as part of the 1st Canadian Contingent of the Boer War. Eventually the brigade was split-up to act in individual of separate British units during the conflict, seeing Drury and "C" Battery work under Major-General Robert Baden Powell for his operations in the western Transvaal.

After the Boer War, Drury as the Military Commander of the Maritime Provinces, would take control of the Halifax Citadel, from British control seeing the last of the permanent British garrison in Canada.

In 1912, Drury would be promoted to the rank of Major-General, one year before his death.

== Family ==
He married Mary Louise Henderson in 1880, daughter of James Alexander Henderson, QC DCL, LL B, and had the following issue:

- Victor Montague Drury (1884–1962)
  - Brigadier-General Charles Mills Drury, PC, OC, CBE, DSO, QC
- Gladys Henderson Drury (1885–1927), Married William Maxwell Aitken, 1st Baron Beaverbrook PC, ONB
  - Janet Gladys Aitken (1908 –1988), Married firstly, Ian Douglas Campbell, 11th Duke of Argyll, secondly, Hon. William Drogo Sturges Montagu, son of George Montagu, 9th Earl of Sandwich, and thirdly, Major Thomas Edward Dealtry Kidd MBE.
  - Sir John William Maxwell Aitken, 2nd Baron Beaverbrook, DSO, DFC

== Honours ==
He was appointed a Companion of the Most Honourable Order of the Bath for his services in South Africa.

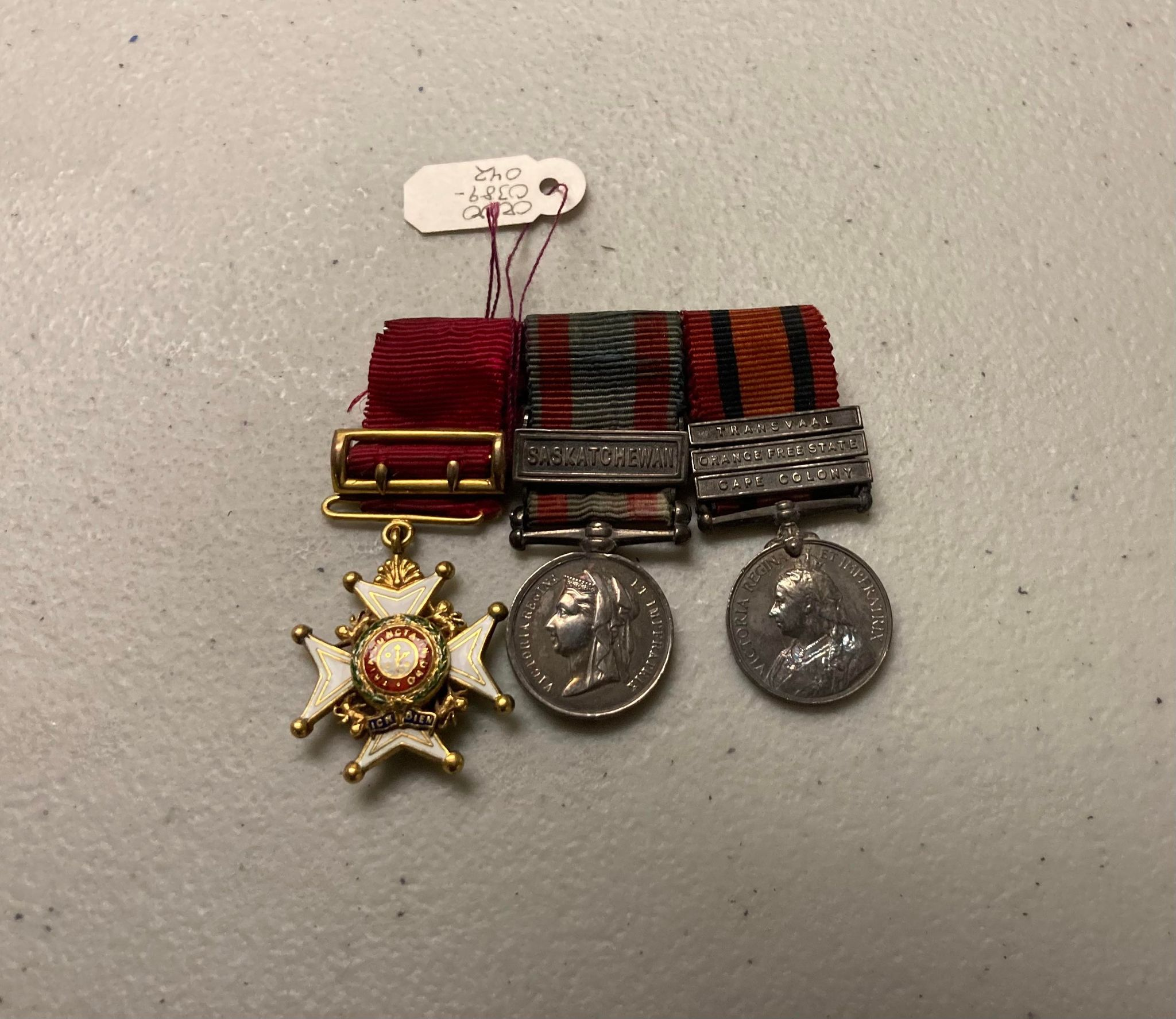
Major-General Drury's Miniature Medals from Archives of the Royal Military College of Canada Museum

Other:

- The Wing of the Royal Canadian Artillery School is named "Drury Wing" in his honour

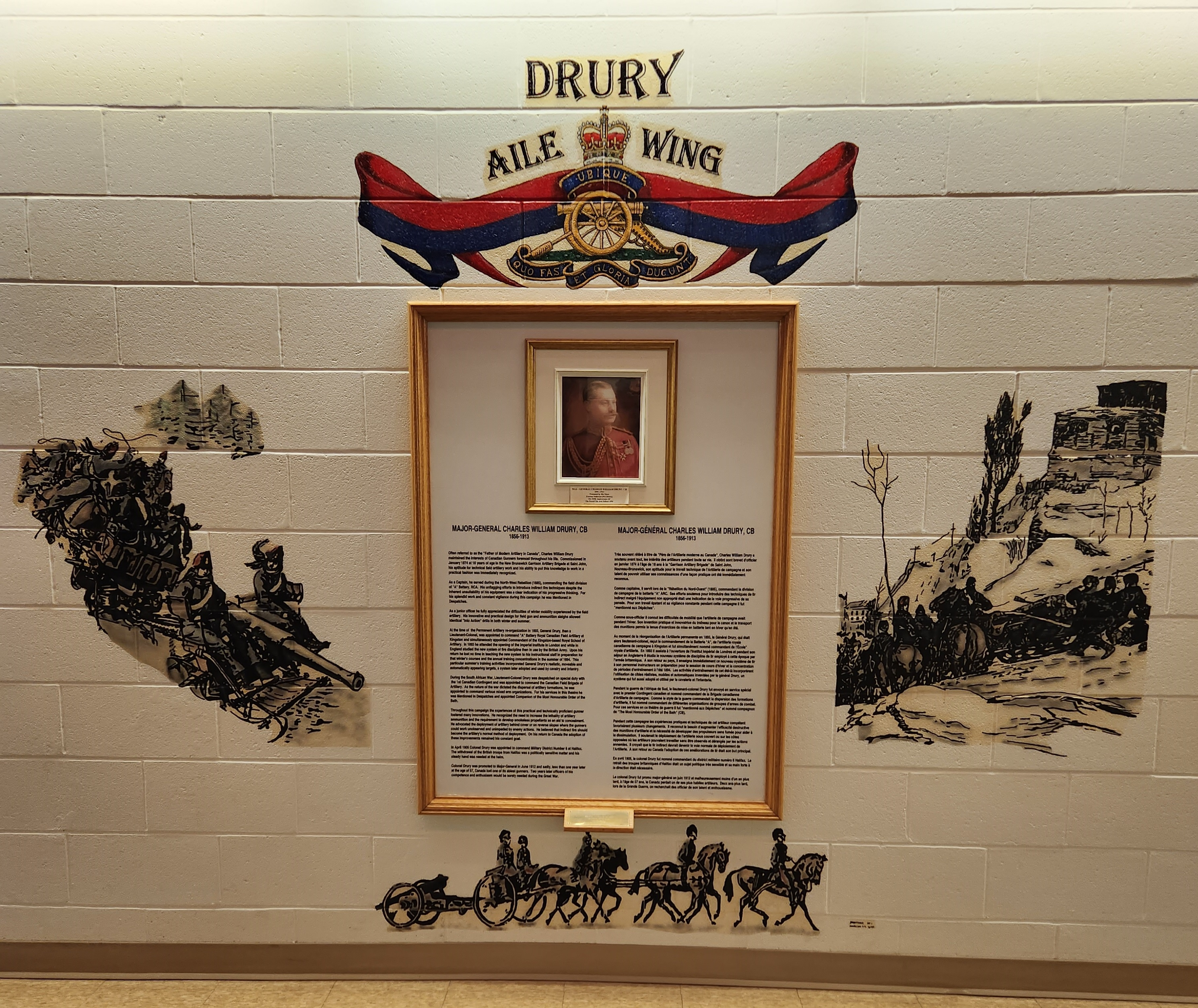
