= Virna Sheard =

Canadian poet and novelist (1862–1943)

- Sheard in 1919
- Born: Virginia Stanton; April 24, 1862; Cobourg, Canada West
- Died: February 22, 1943 (aged 80); Toronto, Ontario
- Occupation: Writer (novelist)
- Spouse: Charles Sheard
- Writing career
- Pen name: Stanton Sheard
- Period: 20th century
- Genres: fiction, poetry

Virginia Sheard (April 24, 1862 – February 22, 1943) was a Canadian poet and novelist. She also wrote under the name Stanton Sheard.

== Early life ==
Sheard was born in Cobourg, Canada West, the daughter of Elizabeth Butler and Eldridge Stanton, a photographer. Eldridge was a descendant of United Empire Loyalists. The family moved soon after to Toronto where she was raised. Her brother Eldridge Stanton Jr. and his wife both died at Niagara Falls, in the Ice Bridge Disaster of 1912.

== Career ==
Sheard began publishing her poems and stories in magazines around 1898. She wrote her first books, Trevelyan's Little Daughters (1898) and A Maid of Many Moods (1902) to entertain her sons. Her adult fiction was written mainly in the romance genre and included, By the Queen's Grace (1904; a romance set in Elizabethan London), The Man at Lone Lake (1912), The Golden Apple Tree (1920), Below the Salt (1936), and Leaves in the Wind (1938). Below the Salt is a melodramatic story of Marcus O'Sullivan, a wealthy Ontario farmer.

She wrote five volumes of poetry, mainly with religious themes. Some of these included The Miracle and Other Poems (1913), Carry On! (1917), The Ballad of the Quest (1922), Candle Flame (1926), and Fairy Doors (1932). She collected what she thought were her best in Leaves in the Wind, (1938).

Her poem "The Young Knights", which opens with the lines "Now they remain to us forever young / Who with such splendour gave their youth away", is often cited among Canadian women's literary responses to World War I. Of her novel By the Queen's Grace, one reviewer wrote: "It is highly romantic (which is important) and highly improbable (which is of no consequence), and readers of 17 or 70 will find it equally to their taste."

== Works ==
- Trevelyan's Little Daughters, (1898)
- A Maid Of Many Moods, (1902)
- By The Queen's Grace, (1904)
- The Man At Lone Lake, (1912)
- The Miracle And Other Poems, (1913)
- Carry On!, (1917)
- The Golden Apple Tree, (1920)
- The Ballad Of The Quest, (1922)
- Candle Flame, (1926)
- Fortune Turns Her Wheel, (1929) (The book is a reissue of By The Queen's Grace)
- Fairy Doors, (1932)
- Below The Salt, (1936)
- Leaves In The Wind, (1938)

== Personal life ==
She married Dr. Charles Sheard in 1884. Her husband's father had been mayor of Toronto, and her husband was Toronto's first Chief Medical Officer; he also served in the Canadian Parliament from 1917 to 1925. Virna and Charles Sheard had four sons, Charles (1886-1947), Paul (1888-1942), Joseph (1891-1954), and Terence (1898-1985). Sheard was widowed in 1929, and died in 1943, aged 81 years. Her papers were destroyed by her family after her death, apparently because they disapproved of her literary work.

The Sheard family's Toronto house, where Virna Sheard lived for much of her adulthood, was destroyed in a fire in 2016.
