= Attorney General McDonell =

Attorney General McDonell may refer to:

- Bob McDonnell (born 1954), Attorney General of Virginia
- Michael McDonnell (1882–1956), Attorney-General of Sierra Leone
- Morgan McDonnell (1824–1889), Attorney-General of Victoria
