= William Henry Pferinger Elkins =

Canadian soldier

Major General William Henry Pferinger Elkins CB CBE DSO
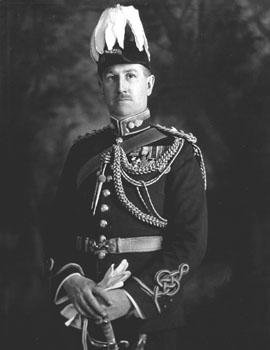

Personal details
- Born: 13 June 1883 Sherbrooke, Quebec
- Died: 1964 (aged 80-81)
- Education: Royal Military College of Canada
- Profession: Soldier

Military service
- Allegiance: Canada
- Branch/service: RCHA
- Rank: Major general

Major General William Henry Pferinger Elkins, CB, CBE, DSO (13 June 1883 – 1964) was a Canadian soldier. He was a commandant of the RMC.

== Education ==
624 Major General William Henry Pferinger Elkins was born on 13 June 1883 at Sherbrooke, Quebec. He graduated from the Bishop's College School in Quebec in 1899 and Royal Military College of Canada in Kingston, Ontario, in June 1905.

== Career ==
He was commissioned in the Royal Canadian Artillery; his first posting was to "B" Battery, RCHA. He served with "N" Battery, RHA in India from 1908 to 1910, and while on the sub-continent completed his captain qualifying examination. He served as Commanding Officer RCHA Brigade 1916–1922. In December 1917, he was evacuated due to illness and convalesced at the Prince of Wales Hospital for Officers at Marylebone, England. He returned to duty with the brigade in time for the German Offensive in the Spring of 1918. Lieutenant-Colonel Elkins controlled the movement and deployment of his own two batteries as well as twelve additionally assigned batteries. He withdrew more than fifty-six kilometres in ten days while under constant enemy pressure. A command of this size was normally a job for a brigadier with a sizeable staff. In October 1918, a Royal Regiment of Canadian Artillery Battery along with "I" and "N" Batteries, Royal Horse Artillery were placed under his command. In an operation supporting an attack on the high ground north of Montay, France the Canadians advanced eight miles on a front of more than three miles, to 400 prisoners and captured a large number of enemy weapons. This action earned Lieutenant-Colonel Elkins a Bar to his DSO. Lieutenant-Colonel Elkins and his brigade returned to their usual peacetime duties of training the militia; he continued in command until 1922 when he was appointed Commandant Royal Regiment of Canadian Artillery, Halifax, Nova Scotia. Other successive appointments were Camp Commandant Petawawa, another short term as commander of the RCHA Brigade and chairman of the Standing Arms Committee. He was promoted colonel in 1925. On his subsequent promotion to brigadier general in 1930, he was appointed to command the Royal Military College of Canada, a post he held until 1935. He was concerned that cadets were prioritising sports during the games season to the detriment of their studies. He introduced an academic eligibility rule in 1931–1932 for participation in hockey and football. He divided the cadet battalion into 6 companies instead of 2 to enable greater participation in intramural sports. He stepped up intramural hockey and Canadian football – increasing the number of games and the number of participants. Royal Military College of Canada aims were to produce officers and engineers, and to provide a general and cultural education. In 1932, the competition to enter Royal Military College of Canada was particularly hot, perhaps a consequence of the Great Depression. Since many recruits had qualifications higher than junior matriculation, they repeated work they had done before and risked becoming bored. Consequently, some elementary science work was dropped in favour of advanced studies in imperial geography, military history and economics. Many parents preferred that their sons prepare for careers in law, accounting or business to engineering. During the construction and industrial growth slump in the Great Depression, engineers found it hard to find employment. In 1932, Elkins disciplined and demoted a BSM to corporal for recruiting/hazing "conducting physical training exercises… in the dormitory" contrary to orders. He served as district officer commanding 2nd Military District 1935–1938. He was master-general of ordnance, National Defence Headquarters 1938–1940. He served as general officer commander in chief Atlantic Command 1940–1943. He retired in 1944. He died in 1964.

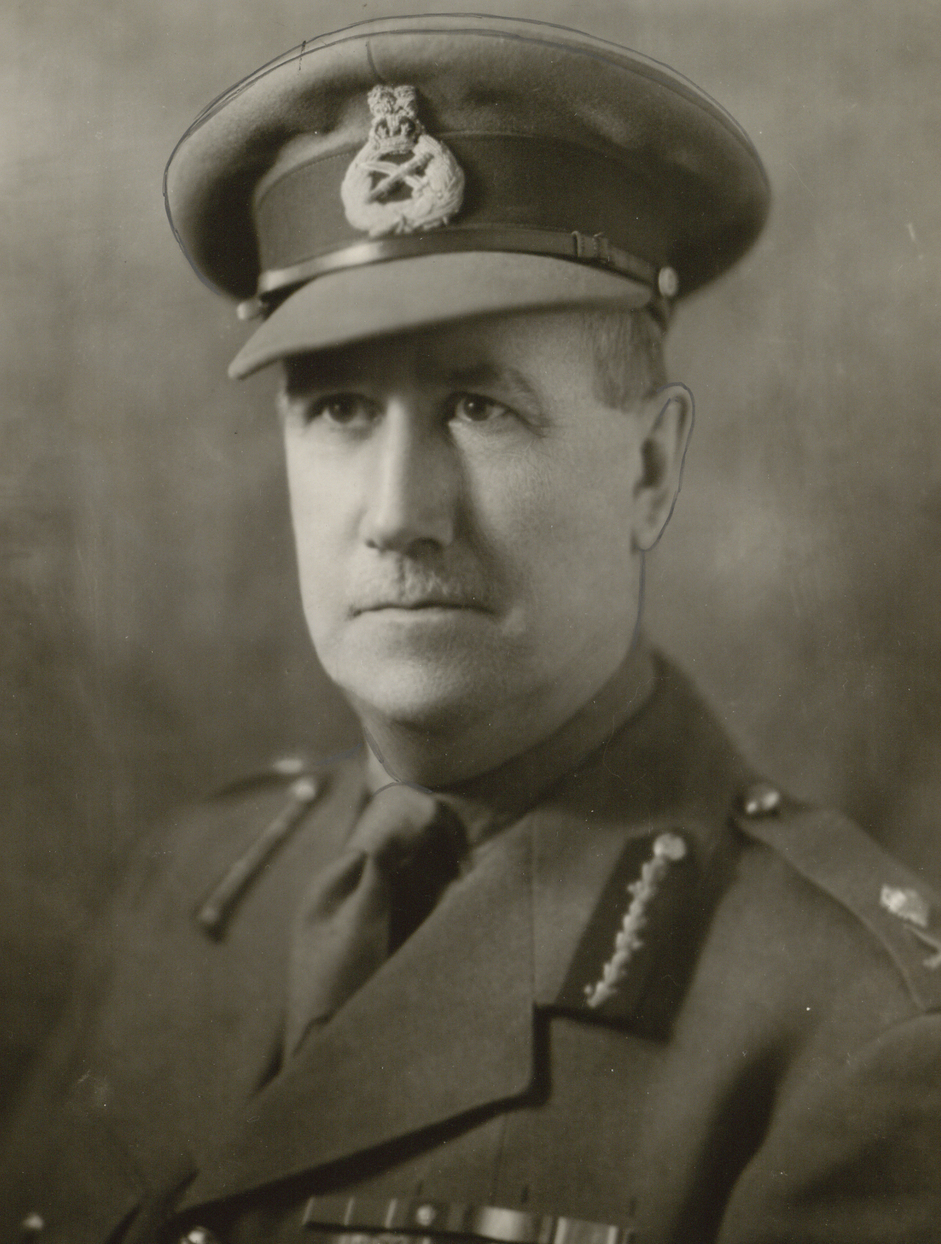
William Henry Pferinger Elkins, 1942

== Honours ==
Major-General Elkins was appointed Commander of the Order of the British Empire (CBE) on 1 January 1935 and in November 1938 was appointed master general of ordnance.

In 1943 he was invested as a Companion of the Order of the Bath (CB) and invested as a Companion of the Distinguished Service Order (DSO).

== Legacy ==
The Elkins piano room at the Royal Artillery (RA) Park Officers Mess in Halifax, Nova Scotia was named in his honour.

=== Books ===
- 4237 Dr. Adrian Preston & Peter Dennis (Edited) "Swords and Covenants" Rowman And Littlefield, London. Croom Helm. 1976.
- H16511 Dr. Richard Arthur Preston "Canada's RMC – A History of Royal Military College" Second Edition 1982
- H1877 R. Guy C. Smith (editor) "As You Were! Ex-Cadets Remember". In 2 Volumes. Volume I: 1876–1918. Volume II: 1919–1984. RMC. Kingston, Ontario. The R.M.C. Club of Canada. 1984
- Chandler B. Beach, Frank Morton McMurry and others. "The New Student's Reference Work: Volume 3" F. E. Compton And Company, 1911

Academic offices
Preceded by Brigadier Harold H. Matthews, CMG, DSO, ADC	Commandant of the Royal Military College of Canada; 1930-5	Succeeded by Lieutenant-General Sir Archibald Macdonell K.C.B., CMG, DSO, ADC, LL.D.

== See also ==
- List of Bishop's College School alumni
