= Charles Drury (footballer) =

English association football player

Personal information
- Full name: Charles Edward Drury
- Date of birth: 4 July 1937
- Place of birth: Darlaston, England
- Date of death: 5 October 2020 (aged 83)
- Height: 1.78 m (5 ft 10 in)
- Positions: Defender; midfielder

Youth career
- 1954–1955: West Bromwich Albion

Senior career*
Years	Team	Apps	(Gls)
1955–1964	West Bromwich Albion	146	(1)
1964–1968	Bristol City	51	(2)
1968–1969	Bradford (Park Avenue)	31	(1)
1969–????	Tamworth		
- * Club domestic league appearances and goals as of 13:00, 9 May 2026 (UTC)

Charles Edward "Chuck" Drury (4 July 1937 – 5 October 2020) was an English footballer who played for West Bromwich Albion, Bristol City, Bradford (Park Avenue) and Tamworth. He played as a defender or midfielder.

== Club career ==
=== West Bromwich Albion ===
Drury joined the youth-team at West Bromwich Albion in 1954, before turning professional in 1955. He made his first team debut in 1958 in an away fixture against Bolton Wanderers, and went on to establish himself as a first team regular during the 1959–60 season.

Drury only scored one goal for West Bromwich Albion, it came in March 1962 in a 5–1 win against local rivals Wolverhampton Wanderers at Molineux Stadium.

Charles went on to make 160 appearances for West Bromwich Albion, before transferring to Bristol City in 1964.

=== Tamworth ===
Drury played for Tamworth during the 1969–70 FA Cup run to the Second round proper for the first time in the clubs history. They lost the tie to Third Division outfit Gillingham 6–0 at Priestfield Stadium on the 6 December 1969
