= Charles Drury (priest) =

Archdeacon of Madras (1875–1881)

Charles Rous Drury (1823–1891) was an Anglican Archdeacon in India in the late 19th century.

Drury was born at Pondicherry on 1 October 1823. He was educated at St John's College, Cambridge and ordained in 1847. After curacies in Apuldram, Compton, West Sussex and St Pancras he was Vicar of Leominster from 1852 to 1856. In that year he went as a Chaplain to Madras. He was Archdeacon of Madras from 1875 to 1881. Returning to Sussex he was the incumbent at Westhampnett from 1881 until his death on 29 October 1891. His widow Agnes died in London on 6 January 1924.
