= Jan Arp =

Canadian general

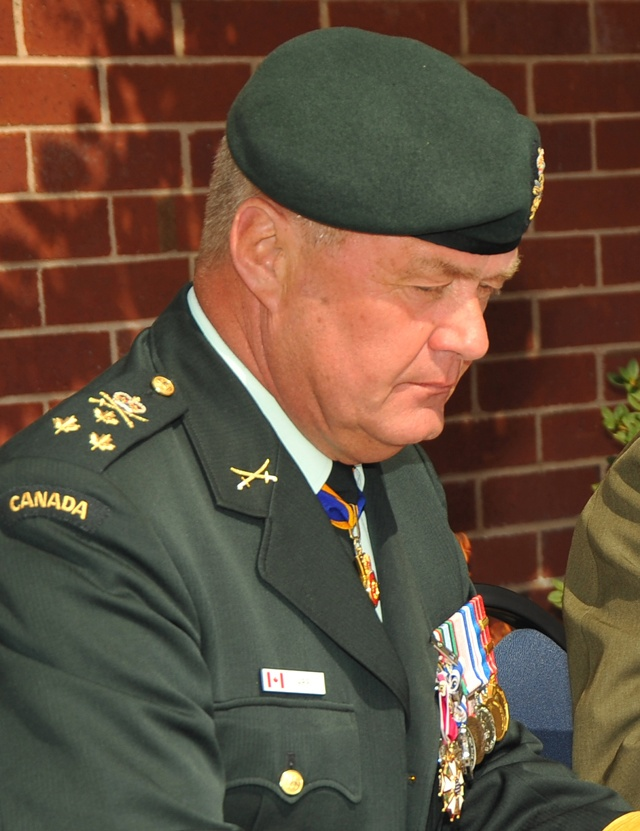
- Occupation: Lieutenant-General

Jan Arp is a retired Canadian Forces lieutenant-general. Appointed in January 2007, he served Chief of Staff at NATO's Headquarters Supreme Allied Command Transformation in Norfolk, Virginia, to 2009, before retiring from the Canadian Armed Forces. In 2009, he was inducted into the Canadian Armed Forces Sports Hall of Fame for his contributions to military soccer. In 2011, he received the NATO Meritorious Service Medal and the United States Legion of Merit.

== Military career ==
Arp originally enrolled in the Canadian Forces as an artillery officer, after completing his undergraduate education at a civilian university, the University of Waterloo.

Over the period 1976 to 1986, Lieutenant-General Arp served in three regiments of the Royal Canadian Horse Artillery, namely the 1st Regiment in Lahr, Germany, the 2nd Regiment in Petawawa, Ontario, and the 3rd Regiment in Shilo, Manitoba. During this period, he filled virtually all Regimental staff and command appointments up to and including battery commander. Subsequently, he commanded the 1st Regiment of the Royal Canadian Horse Artillery in Lahr, Germany, from 1989 to 1991.

Arp has served in a variety of staff positions in Land Requirements and in Personnel as a major, lieutenant-colonel and colonel in National Defence Headquarters (NDHQ) from 1986–89 and 1991-97. During the latter period he also served for one year as the Commander Canadian Contingent as well as the deputy chief of staff of operations for the United Nations Assistance Mission in Rwanda from 1994 to 1995.

Upon promotion to brigadier-general in December 1997 he was appointed as the commandant of the Canadian Land Force Command and Staff College, Kingston, Ontario. He assumed command of the Land Force Doctrine and Training System on its formation in July 1999, and was promoted to major-general while in command. In March 2003, he took up the position of Chief of Staff (Human Resources – Military) at NDHQ.

He became the Commander Canadian Defence Liaison Staff (Washington) and Canadian Defence Attaché in the Canadian Embassy to the United States of America in July 2005. In January 2007, Lieutenant-General Arp was promoted to his current rank and appointed chief of staff, NATO's Headquarters Supreme Allied Command Transformation in Norfolk, Virginia. In March 2008, he and Vice Admiral Juan A. Moreno of the NATO Standardization Agency signed an agreement intended to strengthen cooperation between the two organizations on transformation and interoperability.

Arp remained in the post till 2009. He participated in the NATO Defense College Academic Advisory Board meeting in Rome in May 2009 in his capacity as ACT chief of staff. On 14 July 2009, he was succeeded as chief of staff by Royal Navy Vice Admiral Robert G. Cooling in a change-of-responsibility ceremony in Norfolk. Arp subsequently retired from the Canadian Armed Forces Regular Force in 2009.

== Later career ==
In 2009, Arp was inducted into the Canadian Armed Forces Sports Hall of Fame as a builder of soccer. He had won a gold medal at the Canadian Armed Forces National Soccer Championship in 1978 and subsequently supported military soccer as an organizer and promoter. As a chief of mission, he led Canadian teams at the CISM Americas Men's Soccer Championship in 2002, 2003, 2005 and 2009, and served in the same capacity at the 2005 CISM World Military Men's Soccer Championship. He also served as Canada's chief of mission at the CISM World Military Women's Soccer Championship six times between 2000 and 2009.

In January 2011, Arp was awarded the NATO Meritorious Service Medal. The same year, the Government of Canada recorded his receipt of the United States Legion of Merit, Degree of Officer.

In addition to his Bachelor of Science from the University of Waterloo, he has a Master of Public Policy and Administration from Queen's University.

== Senior military key appointments ==
- Promoted to the rank of brigadier general and appointed commandant of the Canadian Land Force Command and Staff College, Kingston in 1997 - 1999
- Promoted to the rank of major general and appointed commander of Land Force Doctrine and Training System in 1999 - 2002
- Appointed as Chief of Military Personnel in 2002 - 2005
- Appointed as the commander of Canadian Defence Liaison Staff and Canadian Defence Attaché in the Canadian Embassy to the United States of America in July 2005 - 2007
- Promoted to the rank of lieutenant general and appointed as chief of staff, NATO's Headquarters Supreme Allied Command Transformation in Norfolk, Virginia - 2007 - 2009

== Military awards ==
- Commander and Officer of the Order of Military Merit
- Canadian Long Service Decoration With 2 Bar
- NATO Meritorious Service Medal (2011)
