= Charles Constantin =

Charles Constantin may refer to:

- Charles Constantin (ice hockey) (born 1954), former ice hockey left winger
- Charles Constantin (conductor) (1835–1891), French conductor, violinist and composer

== See also ==
- Charles Constantine (disambiguation)
