= Thomas Moss (jurist) =

Canadian politician

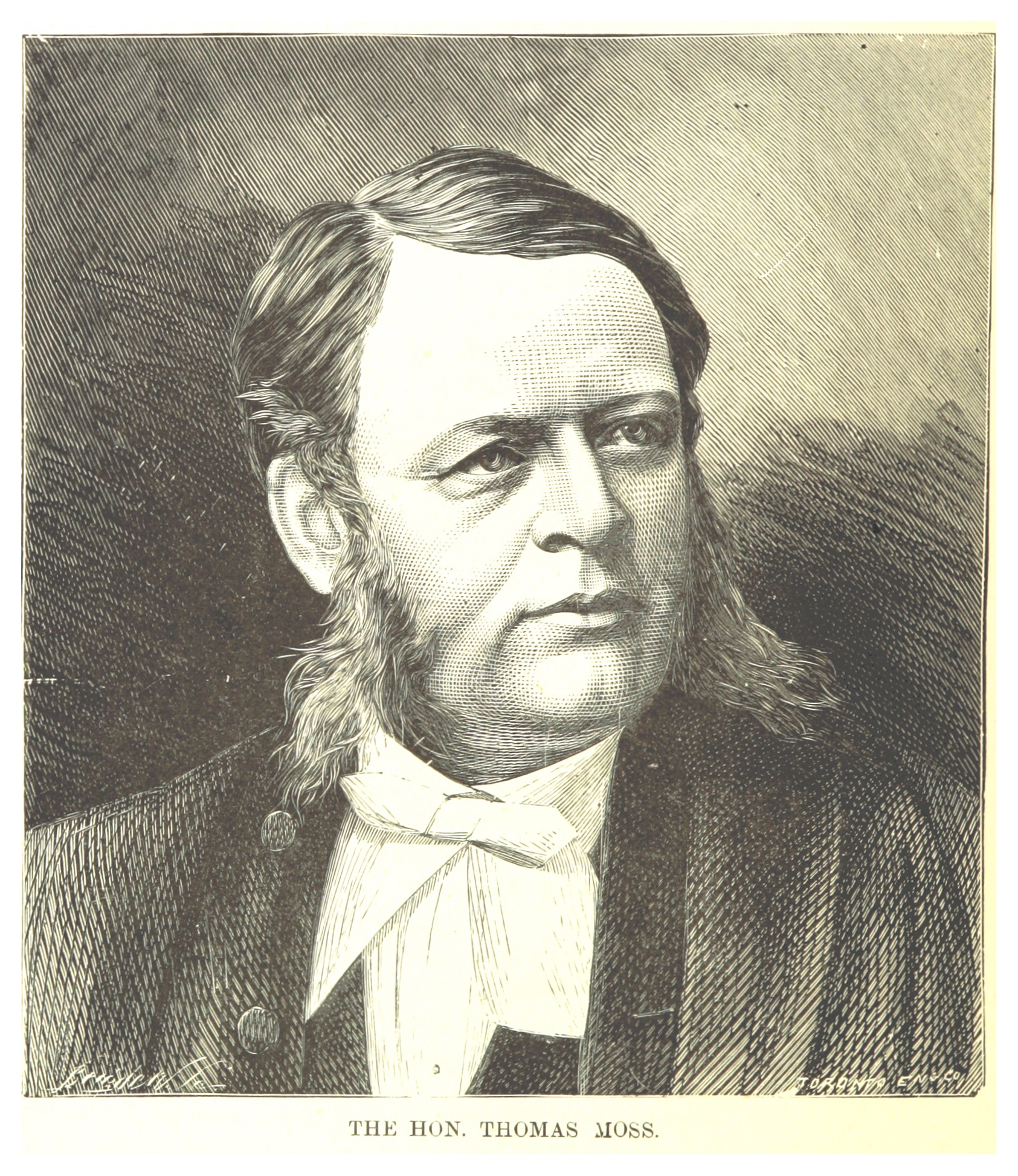

Member of the Canadian Parliament for West Toronto
- In office December 18, 1873 – October 2, 1875
- Preceded by: John Willoughby Crawford
- Succeeded by: John Beverly Robinson

Personal details
- Born: August 20, 1836 Cobourg, Upper Canada
- Died: January 4, 1881 (aged 44) Nice, France
- Party: Liberal

Thomas Moss (August 20, 1836 – January 4, 1881) was a Canadian lawyer, judge and political figure. He represented West Toronto in the House of Commons of Canada from 1873 to 1875 as a Liberal member.

He was born in Cobourg, Upper Canada, the son of John Moss, and grew up in Toronto. He was educated at Upper Canada College and the University of Toronto. Moss studied law with Adam Crooks, was called to the bar in 1861 and practised law in Toronto. In 1863, he married Amy, the daughter of Robert Baldwin Sullivan. Moss was named Queen's Counsel in 1872. He was also a lecturer for the Law Society of Upper Canada and served as registrar and a member of the senate for the University of Toronto. He was elected to the House of Commons in an 1873 by-election held after the death of John Willoughby Crawford. In 1875, he accepted a position as judge in the Ontario Court of Error and Appeal; he was named chief justice in that court two years later and, in 1878, he was named Chief Justice of Ontario. Moss retired from the bench in 1880 due to poor health.

He died in Nice, France early in the following year.

His brother Charles also served as chief justice of Ontario.
