= Archibald Hayes Macdonell =

The Honourable Archibald Hayes Macdonell
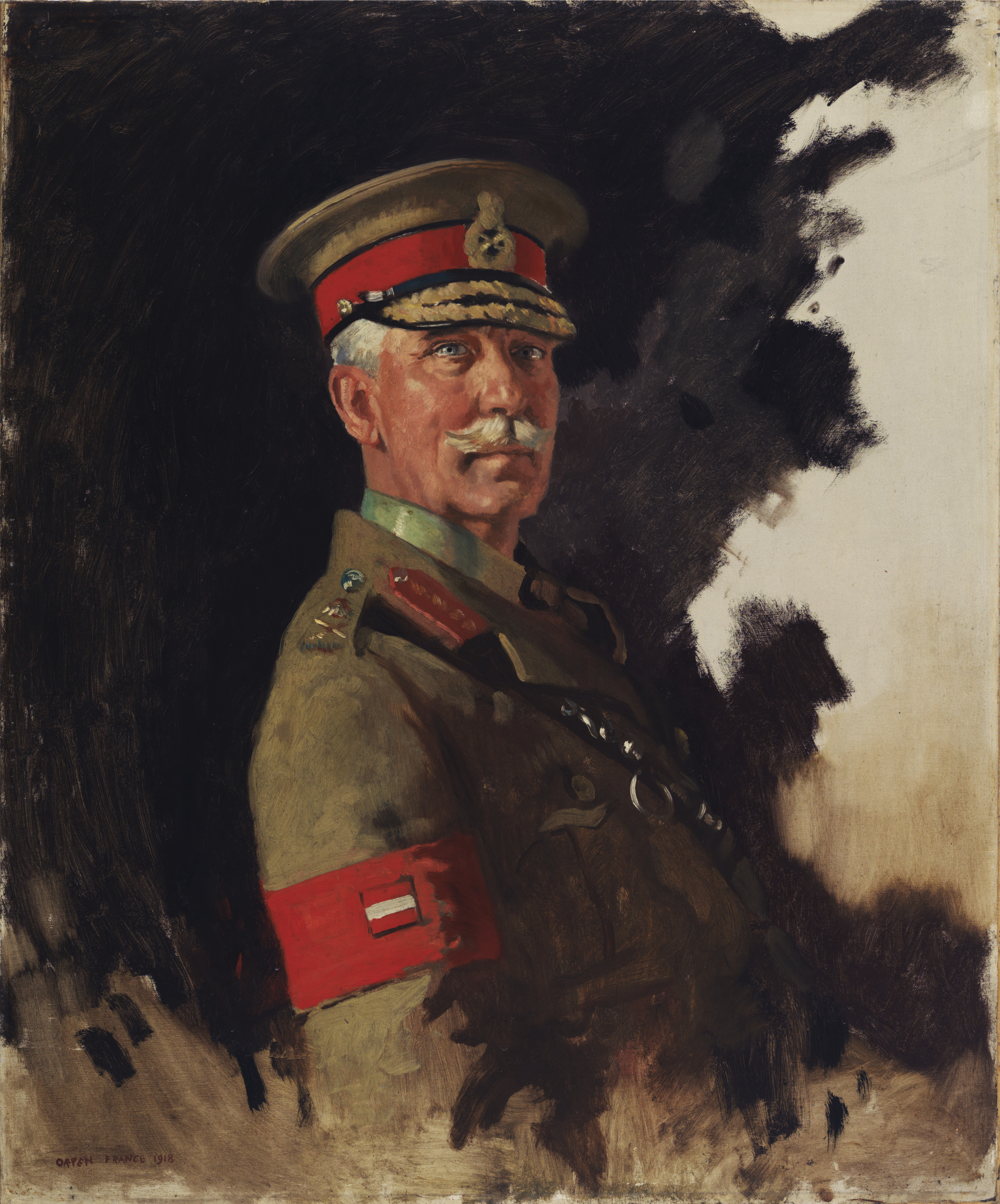
- Archibald Hayes Macdonell

Canadian Senator from Ontario
- In office November 7, 1921 – November 12, 1939
- Appointed by: Arthur Meighen

Personal details
- Born: February 6, 1868 Toronto, Ontario, Canada
- Died: November 12, 1939 (aged 71) Rothesay, New Brunswick, Canada
- Party: Conservative
- Relations: Angus Claude Macdonell, brother

Military service
- Years of service: 1886–1921
- Rank: Major General
- Commands: Military District of New Brunswick (1917–21); 5th Canadian Infantry Brigade (1916–17); The Royal Canadian Regiment (1915)
- Battles/wars: Second Boer War; Battle of Paardeberg; Anglo-Aro War; Ekumeku War; First World War
- Awards: Companion of the Order of St Michael and St George; Distinguished Service Order; Mentioned in Despatches

Major General Archibald Hayes Macdonell, CMG, DSO (February 6, 1868 – November 12, 1939) was a Canadian soldier and politician.

== Biography ==
Born in Toronto, Ontario, the third son of late Angus Duncan Macdonell and Pauline Rosalie De-la-haye, his cousin was Archibald Cameron Macdonell, and his grandfather was Alexander Macdonell. Macdonell served in the Canadian Militia in South Africa, Southern Nigeria, and West Africa. He attended staff college, passing there in 1906. During World War I, promoted to temporary brigadier general in April 1916, he commanded the 5th Canadian Infantry Brigade.

After the war, as a major general, he was the commanding officer of the military district of New Brunswick. In 1921, he was summoned to the Senate of Canada for the senatorial division of Toronto South, Ontario on the advice of Conservative Prime Minister Arthur Meighen. He served until his death in 1939.

His brother, Angus Claude Macdonell, was an MP and senator.

== Archives ==
There is an Archibald Hayes Macdonell fonds at Library and Archives Canada.
