= Archibald Cameron Macdonell =

Canadian police officer and soldier (1864–1941)

Sir Archibald Cameron Macdonell
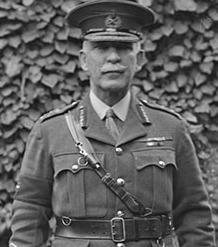
- Macdonell, presumably during the First World War.
- Born: October 6, 1864; Windsor, Canada West
- Died: December 23, 1941 (aged 77); Kingston, Ontario
- Military career
- Allegiance: Canada
- Branch: Canadian Army
- Service years: 1886–1925
- Rank: Lieutenant General
- Unit: Lord Strathcona's Horse (Royal Canadians)
- Commands: Lord Strathcona's Horse (Royal Canadians) 5th Battalion, Canadian Mounted Rifles, CEF; 7th Canadian Brigade; 1st Canadian Division Royal Military College of Canada
- Conflicts: Second Boer War: Battle of Diamond Hill (WIA); World War I: Battle of Festubert
- Awards: Knight Commander of the Order of the Bath; Companion of the Order of St Michael and St George; Distinguished Service Order; Mentioned in dispatches (7); Croix de Guerre; Legion of Honour

Sir Archibald Cameron Macdonell, KCB CMG DSO (6 October 1864 – 23 December 1941) was a Canadian police officer and soldier.

== Education ==
He was born in Windsor, Canada West. His cousin was Archibald Hayes Macdonell, and his grandfather was Alexander Macdonell. He was educated at Trinity College School, Port Hope, Ontario, and graduated from the Royal Military College of Canada in 1886, student number 151. He received a commission in the Royal Artillery but resigned for family reasons without actually joining.

== Military service ==
=== Early service ===
Macdonell became a lieutenant in the Canadian Militia on 26 June 1886. He joined the Regular Canadian Army as a Lieutenant in the Canadian Mounted Infantry, Permanent Corps of Canada, on 6 April 1888. He exchanged into the North-West Mounted Police in September 1889, and was Adjutant of the whole force. He was in command of C Division and the Battleford District.

He volunteered into the 2nd Battalion, Canadian Mounted Rifles for service in South Africa during the Second Boer War in January 1900, as captain, and was promoted major in May 1900. He was awarded a Distinguished Service Order for his actions with the 2nd Canadian Mounted Rifles in South Africa. After returning to Canada, he was in April 1902 appointed to command the Western Regiment of the fourth Canadian contingent which left for service in South Africa the following month.

He fought with the 2nd Battalion, Canadian Mounted Rifles and was commander of the 5th Battalion Canadian Mounted Rifles.

Macdonell was Commanding Officer of the Lord Strathcona's Horse (Royal Canadians) regiment, during the periods March 1907 to April 1910 and April 1912 to December 1915.

=== The Great War ===
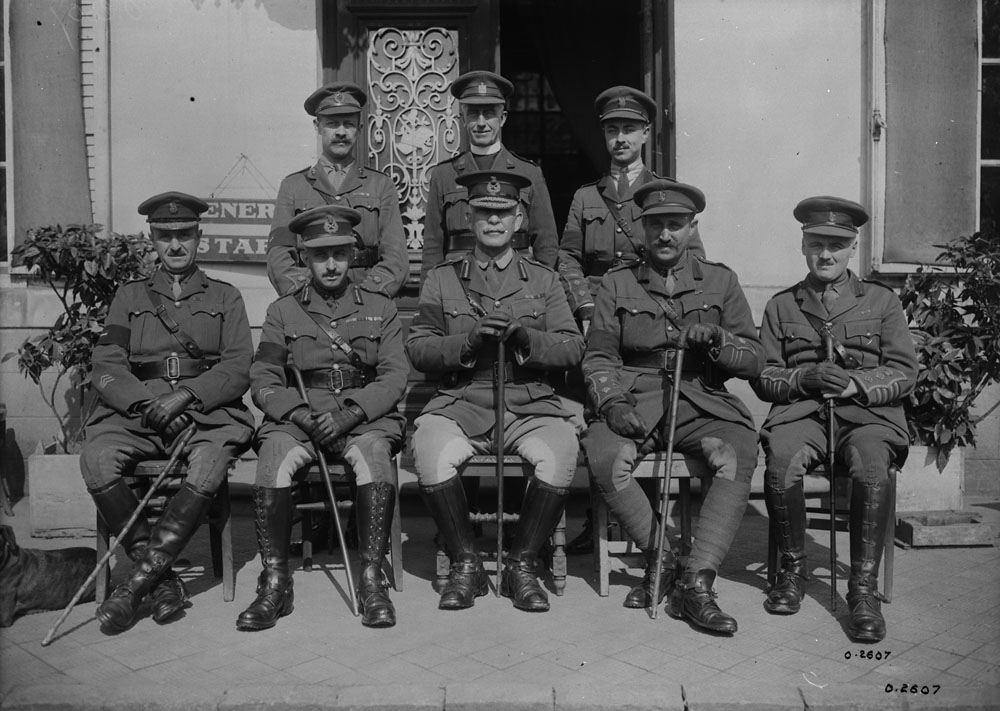
Major General Macdonnell, GOC 1st Canadian Division, seated at the centre of his divisional staff, pictured here sometime in 1918.

He was the Commander 7th Canadian Brigade, and was granted the temporary rank of brigadier general while employed in this role, and 1st Canadian Division during the First World War. Sir Archie had been awarded the Order- Knight Commander, The Most Honourable Order of the Bath (military division) [hence the post-nominals, KCB] for his service in the First World War. This grade of the Order conferred Knighthood and the right to bear the title, "Sir". He was awarded the neck badge and the Breast Star of a Knight Commander of the Order of the Bath.

After being promoted to brigadier-general, he commanded the 7th Infantry Brigade, 3rd Canadian Infantry Division, and in June 1917 the 1st Canadian Division. Pierre Berton described MacDonnell in the book Vimy:

MacDonell was known as a front-line soldier; indeed, (28-year-old intelligence officer Hal) Wallis was to say he spent as much time at the front with his brigadier as he had in his days as a private. Not for nothing did the men of the 7th call MacDonell "Fighting Mac" and sometimes "Batty Mac" because of his eccentricities under fire. Everybody knew the story of how he'd gone so far into No Man's Land that a sniper put a bullet in his arm. Instead of ducking, Batty Mac had stood up swearing, shaking his unwounded arm angrily at the sniper, who immediately put another bullet in his good arm. And everybody also knew that MacDonell, at the Somme, had insisted on walking among the wounded after the attack on the Regina Trench, unmindful of the enemy shells, to salute the corpses of the Black Watch. A sentimental Scot who sometimes swore in Gaelic in moments of great pressure, MacDonell stopped at every corpse and said "I salute you, my brave Highlander," until Wallis managed to pull him to safety.

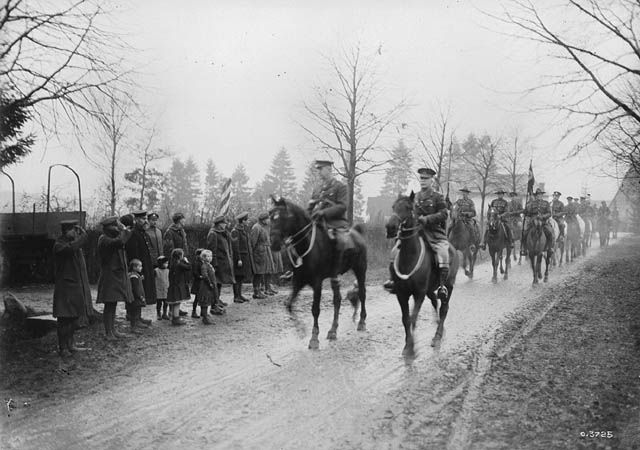
Canadian troops entering Germany en route to the Rhine River, Germany, November 1918. On horseback is Lieutenant General Arthur Currie, GOC Canadian Corps, and Major General Macdonell, GOC 1st Canadian Division.

A Presentation General Officer sword, which he was awarded in May 1919 by the officers of the 1st Canadian Division, 'The Older Patch' is in the collection of the Royal Military College of Canada virtual museum

=== Post-war ===
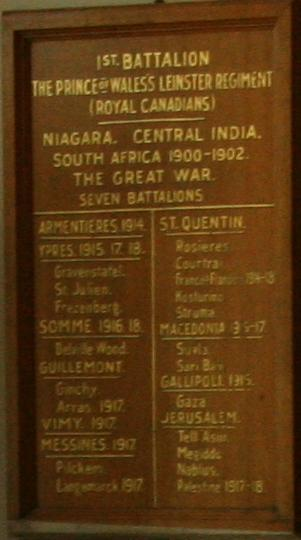
Prince of Wales's Leinster Regiment Royal Canadians plaque @ Royal Military College of Canada

From 1919 to 1925, he was appointed commandant of the RMC. He was the first Canadian commandant at the college. When the Prince of Wales's Leinster Regiment was disbanded in 1922, they gave their silver plate, in trust, to the Government of Canada, which in turn, placed the collection, in trust, with then Commandant Archibald Macdonell. Some pieces are on display in the college's Senior Staff Mess, and other select pieces are on display at the Royal Military College of Canada Museum. A plaque in the Senior Staff Mess, enumerates Regiment's locations of service.

On his retirement from the Army in 1925, he was promoted to Lieut-General in recognition of his years of service. From 8 May 1922 until his death in January 1942, he was Honorary Colonel to Lord Strathcona's Horse.

From 1921 to 1940 he served as honorary colonel of the Stormont, Dundas and Glengarry Highlanders.

He was placed on the Reserve of Officers as a lieutenant general.

He died in 1942 and was buried in Catarqui Cemetery in Kingston, Ontario.

== Legacy ==
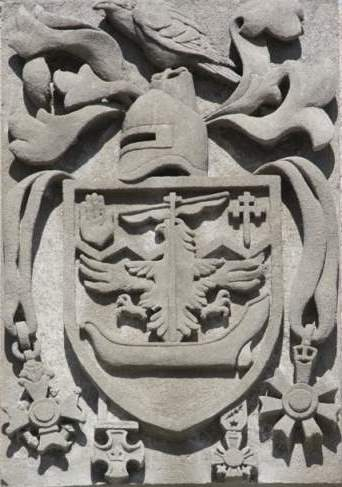
Lt Gen Sir Archibald Cameron Macdonell coat of arms, Currie Building, Royal Military College of Canada

The Sir Archibald Macdonell Athletic Centre or SAM Centre, which opened in 1974, at the RMC in Kingston, Ontario is named after Lieutenant-General, Sir A.C. Macdonell, KCB, CMG, DSO, C de G. His cocked bi-corn hat, a form of headdress worn by Colonels, General Officers and Staff Officers, with red and white feathers for Generals, is on display at the Kingston Military Community Sports Centre.

The personal coat of arms of Lt Gen Sir Archibald Cameron Macdonell was carved on the Currie Building at the Royal Military College of Canada.

== Arms ==
Coat of arms of Archibald Cameron Macdonell
Adopted 11 June 1919 Crest A raven proper perched on a rock Azure Escutcheon Or an eagle displayed Gules surmounted by a lymphad Sable, sail furled proper, on a chief indented Sable a dexter hand couped and a cross crosslet fitché Or Motto Slogan: CREAGAN AN FHITHICH (Scottish Gaelic for 'The raven’s rock'); Motto: AIR MUIR ʼS AIR TIR (Scottish Gaelic for 'By sea, by land') Orders Order of the Bath: TRIA UNCTA IN UNO (Latin for 'Three joined in one'); Ich dien (German for 'I serve'); Order of St Michael and St George; Distinguished Service Order; Croix de Guerre Other elements The laurel wreath around the arms indicates the armiger was a recipient of the military division of the Order of the Bath.

Military offices
Preceded by Arthur Currie	GOC 1st Canadian Division; 1917–1919	Succeeded by Post disbanded
Preceded by Charles Constantine	Commandant of the Royal Military College of Canada; 1919–1925	Succeeded by Charles Perreau
