= Royal Canadian Horse Artillery =

- Garter badge of the RCHA
- Active: 1871–present
- Country: Canada
- Branch: Canadian Army
- Type: Horse artillery
- Role: Field artillery
- Size: 3 regiments
- Part of: 1st Regiment: 1 Canadian Mechanized Brigade Group; 2nd Regiment: 2 Canadian Mechanized Brigade Group; 5^{e} Régiment: 5 Canadian Mechanized Brigade Group
- Garrison/HQ: 1st Regiment: CFB Shilo; 2nd Regiment: CFB Petawawa; 5^{e} Régiment: CFB Valcartier
- Mottos: Ubique (everywhere); Quo fas et gloria ducunt (whither right and glory lead)
- March: Slow march: "Royal Artillery Slow March"; Quick march: "British Grenadiers"; Trot past: "Keel Row"; Gallop past: "Bonnie Dundee"

Commanders
- Notable commanders: Brigadier General William Henry Pferinger Elkins CB, C.B.E., DSO
- Abbreviation: RCHA

The Royal Canadian Horse Artillery is the name given to the regular field artillery units of the Canadian Army.

== Organization ==
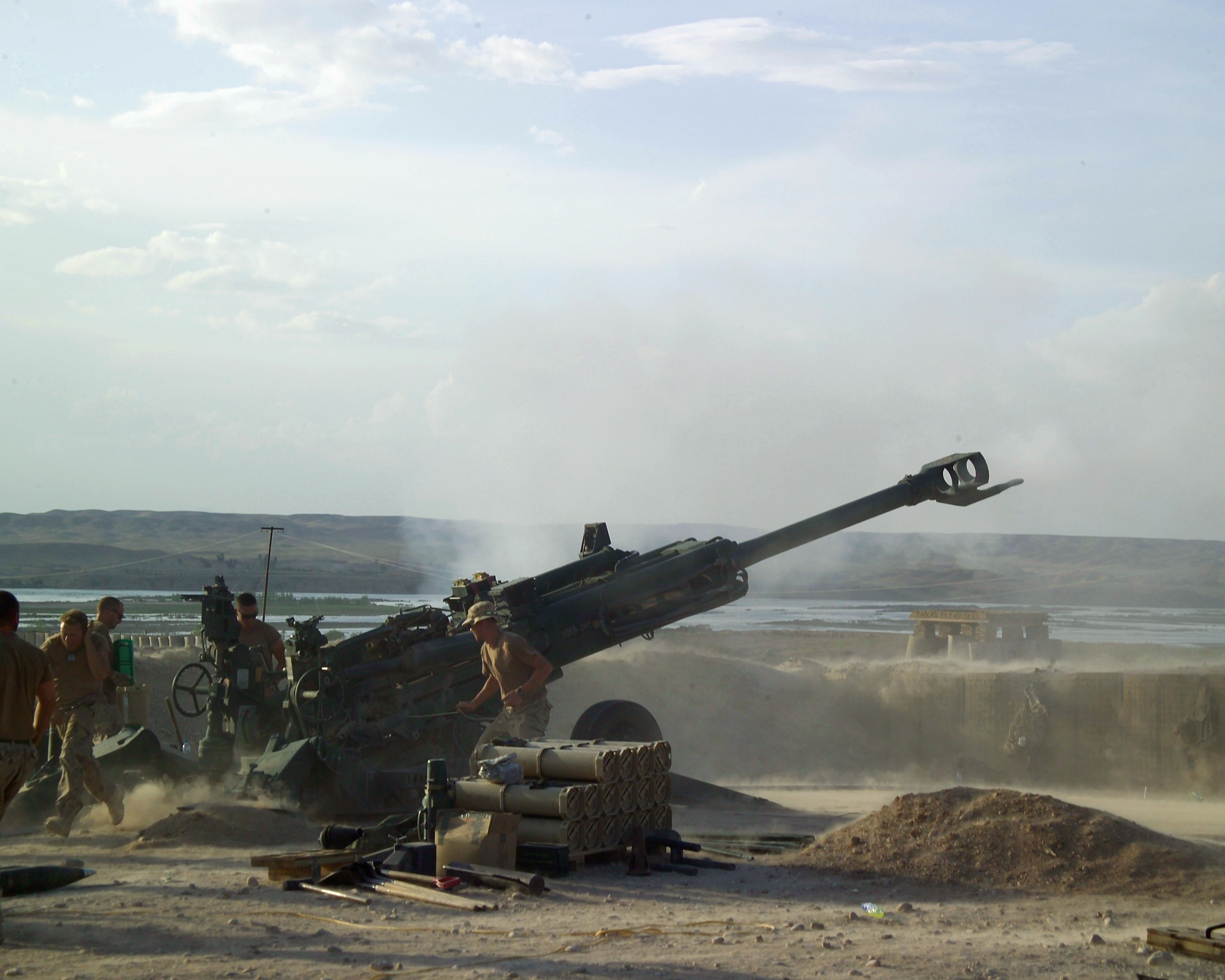
Canadian soldiers fire an M777 howitzer in Afghanistan.

The Regular Force has three RCHA regiments:

1st Regiment, Royal Canadian Horse Artillery
this is the descendant of the original batteries of artillery formed in 1871, and is thus the senior Regular unit in the Canadian army. 1 RCHA was forward deployed in Germany as part of Canadian Forces Europe for 25 years between 1967, and the final Canadian withdrawal from Europe in 1993. Currently, this regiment is part of 3rd Canadian Division's 1 Canadian Mechanized Brigade Group.
2nd Regiment, Royal Canadian Horse Artillery
2 RCHA was formed in 1950 for service in the Korean War. 2 RCHA is part of 4th Canadian Division's 2 Canadian Mechanized Brigade Group and is located in Garrison Petawawa. It is composed of two Gun Batteries (D and E), one Surveillance and Target Acquisition Battery (F), a Forward Observation Battery (Y), and its Headquarters Battery (HQ).
5^{e} Régiment d'artillerie légère du Canada
5 RALC is the francophone element of the regular artillery, and was formed in 1968. 5 RALC is part of 2nd Canadian Division's 5 Canadian Mechanized Brigade Group. It is composed of two Gun Batteries (X and R), one Surveillance and Target Acquisition Battery (Q), a Forward Observation Battery (V), and its Headquarters Battery (C/S).

== History ==
RCHA units are the senior units of the Canadian land field force, with a history dating back to the birth of Canada as a nation. 'A' and 'B' Batteries of Garrison Artillery were formed as the first units of Canada's permanent military force in 1871 in Kingston and Quebec City respectively, with a third ('C' Battery) authorized in 1883 and formed in 1887 in Esquimalt. These bore the name of the Regiment of Canadian Artillery, with the Royal Canadian Artillery being formed as the militia element in 1895. In 1905, to distinguish between the regular force and militia, the regulars were given the title Royal Canadian Horse Artillery.

In addition to the three regiments currently serving, two further regiments have served in the past prior to being disbanded:

3rd Regiment, RCHA
originally formed as 79th Field Regiment, RCA, this regiment received its name in 1953 during the reorganization of the Canadian Army as a result of Canada's NATO commitments. 3 RCHA was reduced to nil strength in 1992 following the downsizing of the Land Force, and was replaced at CFB Shilo by 1 RCHA on its return from Germany.
4th Regiment, RCHA
originally 81st Field Regiment, RCA, this regiment became part of the Royal Canadian Horse Artillery at the same time as 3 RCHA in 1953. 4 RCHA was primarily stationed at CFB Petawawa until 1970 when, following the formation of 5 RALC, it was reduced to nil strength and replaced by 2 RCHA.

The Freedom of the City was exercised by the 2nd Regiment, Royal Canadian Horse Artillery in Kingston in 1983; 1996 and May 26, 2012.

=== Lineage of Royal Canadian Horse Artillery units ===
Lineage chart

1871	Independent btys
1898	RCA (Fd Div.)
1899	Bde Div., RCA (Note: Active service)
1901	Disbanded	RCFA
1905	RCHA
1914	RCHA Bde, CEF
1920	Disbanded
1939	1st Fd Bde, RCA, CASF
1939	1st Fd Regt, RCA, CASF
1941	1st Fd Regt, RCHA, CASF
1945	1st CFA Bn, RCA, CASF
1945	2nd/1st Fd Regt, RCHA, CASF	Disbanded
1946	71st Regt, RCHA, CASF
1946	71st Regt (RCHA)
1949	1st Fd Regt, RCHA
1950	2nd Fd Regt, RCHA
1951	1st Regt, RCHA	2nd Regt, RCHA (Note: Special Force)	79th Fd Regt, RCA
1952	Special Force	Regular Force	81st Fd Regt, RCA
1953	Regular Force	3rd Regt, RCHA	4th Regt, RCHA
1968	5^{e} Rég^{t} d'artillerie légère du Canada
1970	Supplementary Order of Battle
1992	Supplementary Order of Battle

== Commemorations ==
The Royal Canadian Horse Artillery badge (1968) by Robert McCausland Limited is a stained glass memorial to 2517 Colonel E. Geoffrey Brooks DSO OBE CD (RMC 1952), who served as the Royal Military College of Canada's staff adjutant 1948–1950 and as Director of Artillery, Royal Canadian Artillery in August 1960. He is remembered in the Geoffrey Brooks Memorial Essay Competition – 2,000 to 3,000 words on any topic of military history or specific military interest that pertains to The Royal Regiment of Canadian Artillery. The contest (1st Prize -$500; 2nd Prize -$300; and 3rd Prize – $200) is open to all DND military (Regular and Reserve) and civilian personnel and students attending post-secondary educational institutes.

Location	Date	Description	Manufacturer	Inscription	Window
Sir Arthur Currie Hall, Royal Military College of Canada, Kingston, Ontario	1968	1 light Royal Canadian Horse Artillery badge	Robert McCausland Limited	In memory of Colonel Edward Geoffrey Brooks DSO OBE CD 1918–1964 staff adjutant 1948–1950 by classes of 1948–52; features badge of Royal Canadian Horse Artillery	

== Affiliations ==
- United Kingdom: Royal Horse Artillery

The RCHA's Great War Canadian Cavalry Brigade identifying flash.

== See also ==
- The Canadian Crown and the Canadian Armed Forces
- List of Canadian organizations with royal patronage

== Media ==
- RCHA—Right of the Line: An Anecdotal History of the Royal Canadian Horse Artillery from 1871 by B.A.; Simcock, W.; Goski, Joseph G. Mitchell G.D.; Reid (1986)
- Ataliumasta: Cyprus, August 1985 – March 1986: Second Regiment, Royal Canadian Horse Artillery, 3 Commando Canadian by unknown (9999)

== Order of precedence ==
Preceded by First in precedence of Royal Canadian Artillery Regiments	1st Regiment, Royal Canadian Horse Artillery	Succeeded by 2nd Regiment, Royal Canadian Horse Artillery

Preceded by 1st Regiment, Royal Canadian Horse Artillery	2nd Regiment, Royal Canadian Horse Artillery	Succeeded by 5^{e} Régiment d'artillerie légère du Canada of Royal Canadian Artillery Regiments
