= Welland House Hotel =

Historic building in St. Catharines, Ontario, Canada

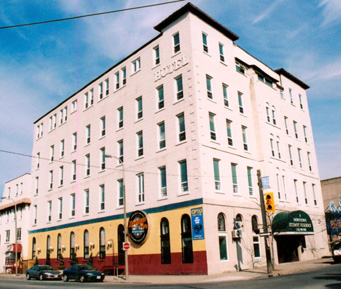
- A modern photograph of the building before it was destroyed by a fire
- Interactive map of the Welland House Hotel area

General information
- Location: St. Catharines, Canada
- Coordinates: 43.1563049°N 79.2478617°W
- Opened: 1856

The Welland House Hotel was a historic building located on 26-30 Ontario Street in Downtown St. Catharines, Ontario, Canada. The hotel spa resort was one of many in Upper Canada during the Victorian era. It closed in 1993. As of 2020, the site was in the process of being designated as a heritage site to prevent future demolition. Its last use was as a student residence, and then sat vacant. On July 12, 2021; it was destroyed in an early morning fire.

== Early history ==
The property on which the spa would eventually be built was originally purchased by William Hamilton Merritt, a businessman who was inclined to render salt through boiling local saline water instead of importing it from Onondaga County, New York, as such imports were costly. Merritt sold the property to William Chase, who commissioned the saltworks to have a bathhouse built alongside it. The facility was racially segregated and refused to serve black patrons. This policy was changed in 1854 after black employees formed an organized protest.

Chase eventually sold the bathhouse to his competitor Colonel E.W. Stephenson. Stephenson used the property to open the Welland House Hotel as an overflow site for the nearby Stephenson House. At its peak, the hotel could accommodate 400 guests. St. Catharines had many freedom seekers and the hotel provided paid wages to people starting a life in the city. Hotel spa resorts were fashionable in Upper Canada during the Victorian era. St. Catharines had three major spas of its own: the Welland House Hotel, the Stephenson House, and the Springbank. The Welland House Hotel was constructed near Twelve Mile Creek to take advantage of the purported benefits of its mineral waters. Visitors were typically upper class citizens seeking leisure or relief from illness through spa therapy. Visitors from the United States were rumoured to be there for espionage during the American Civil War, as both confederate and union figures stayed at the hotel.

== Notable guests ==
- Frederick Hamilton-Temple-Blackwood, 1st Marquess of Dufferin and Ava
- John A. Macdonald
- John Sandfield Macdonald
- Mary Anna Custis Lee
- Mary Todd Lincoln
- Preston Brooks

== Later use ==
In November 1909, Mary Malcolmson started the first North American Girl Guide troop at the Welland House. (Note: According to the monument located between Queen Street and Church Street in St. Catharines)

A private maternity hospital named the Wellandra operated in the Welland House Hotel by 1910. The back of the building may have been used for this purpose. During the Spanish flu pandemic, the top floor of the Welland House was used for patients. After the hospital closed, small businesses utilized the space.

From 1930 to 1938, the second floor of the Welland House hosted the CKTB radio station. This was the first radio station to exist in St. Catharines. The Alibi Room at the Welland House was known to be a meeting place for gays and lesbians in the 1960s to 1970s. Before the Welland House Hotel was destroyed by a fire, it was most recently used as a student residence building.

== Destruction and demolition ==
A fire destroyed the Welland House on July 12, 2021. The vacant building was in the process of potentially being designated as a heritage site to prevent future demolition. However, in the early hours of July 12, 2021, emergency crews were called out to the Welland House regarding a large fire. Investigators have concluded that the fire started on the third floor of the building but were not able to determine any likely causes. Demolition of the remaining debris was delayed. It was anticipated to take longer than other demolition projects as a result of attempting historical preservation where possible. Debris remained when demolition suddenly ceased in July 2022 as a result of a financial dispute. In February 2023, an estimated 80% of the demolition process had been completed. The demolition permit was applicable until July 2023. In August 2023, the City of St. Catharines ordered the property owner to remove remaining debris through enforcement of a bylaw.

== See also ==
- St. Catharines General Hospital
