= Mary Pellatt =

First Chief Commissioner of the Girl Guides of Canada

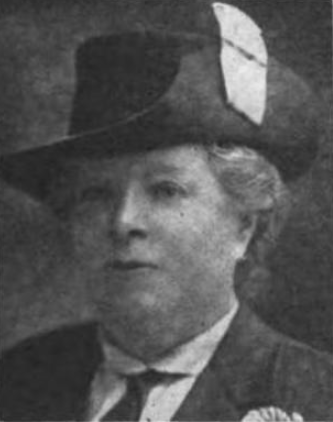
- Lady Pellatt, c. 1922
- Born: Mary Dodgson; April 16, 1857; Toronto, Canada West
- Died: April 15, 1924 (aged 66); Toronto, Ontario, Canada
- Resting place: King, Ontario, Canada
- Title: Lady Pellatt
- Spouse: Sir Henry Pellatt (m. 1882)
- Children: Reginald Pellatt
- Father: John Dodgson

Mary Pellatt, Lady Pellatt (née Dodgson; April 16, 1857 – April 15, 1924) was a Canadian philanthropist who served as the first Chief Commissioner of the Girl Guides of Canada. She was awarded the Silver Fish Award in 1922.

== Biography ==
She was born on April 16, 1857, in Toronto, Canada West (now Ontario). She was educated at Bishop Strachan School, an Anglican all-girls school in Toronto.

On June 15, 1882, she married Henry Pellatt, who was knighted in 1905 by King Edward VII. They had one son, Reginald, who was born in 1885. Colonel Reginald Pellatt (1885–1967) was a stockbroker who married but had no children.

She was named the first Chief Commissioner of the Dominion of Canada Girl Guides on July 24, 1912. As early as 1913, she invited Guides to view her palatial home, Casa Loma. Guides became frequent visitors to the house and its grounds. Casa Loma now features a Girl Guide display and is also a tourist attraction.

In addition, Pellatt planned trips for the Guides to her country home, Mary Lake Farm, in King, Ontario. She resigned from her position in 1921 because of ill health. In 1922, she was presented with the Silver Fish Award.

She died suddenly of heart failure on April 15, 1924, at her home in Toronto. The Girl Guides formed a Guard of Honour for her funeral at St. James' Cathedral in Toronto. She was buried in her Girl Guide uniform in King, Ontario, but has a memorial alongside Henry Pellatt at Forest Lawn Mausoleum in Toronto.

== See also ==
- Olave Baden-Powell
- Mary Malcolmson
