= Henry Pellatt =

Canadian financier and soldier

Major-General Sir Henry Pellatt CVO
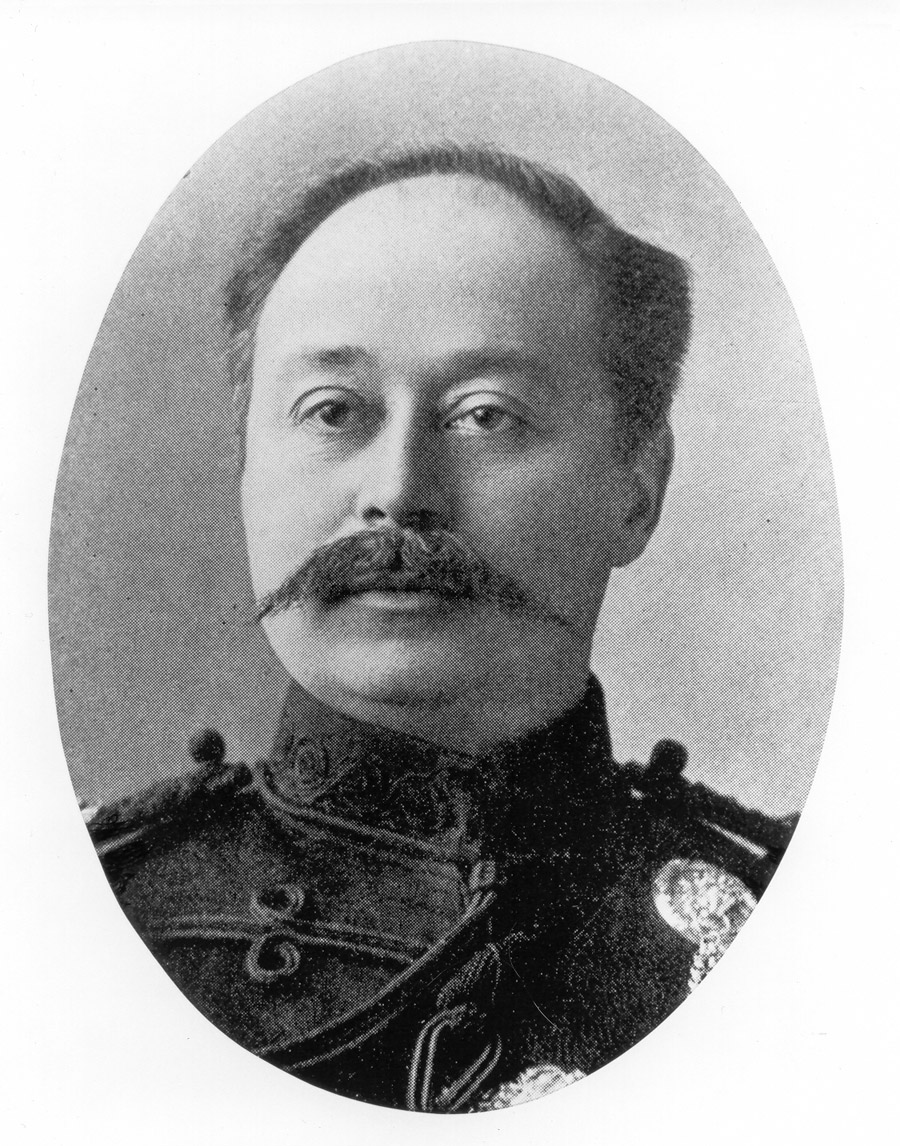
- Born: January 6, 1859; Kingston, Canada West
- Died: March 8, 1939 (aged 80); Mimico, Ontario, Canada
- Resting place: Forest Lawn Mausoleum, Toronto
- Education: Upper Canada College
- Occupations: Financier and soldier
- Known for: Casa Loma and bringing hydro-electricity to Toronto
- Spouse(s): Mary Dodgson (m. 1882–1924); Catharine Welland Merritt (m. 1927–1929)
- Children: Reginald Pellatt
- Military career
- Allegiance: Dominion of Canada
- Branch: Canadian Militia
- Service years: 1876–1911
- Rank: Major-General
- Commands: Queen's Own Rifles of Canada
- Awards: Knight Bachelor; Commander of the Royal Victorian Order

Major-General Sir Henry Mill Pellatt, CVO (January 6, 1859 – March 8, 1939) was a Canadian financier and soldier. He was involved in bringing hydro-electricity to Toronto for the first time. His château in Toronto, called Casa Loma, was the largest private residence ever constructed in Canada and became a landmark of the city. His summer home and farm in King City, Ontario, later became Marylake Augustinian Monastery.

Pellatt was also a supporter of the Boy Scouts of Canada. His first wife, Mary, was the first Chief Commissioner of the Girl Guides of Canada.

== Early life and family ==
Pellatt was born in Kingston, Canada West (now Ontario), the son of Henry Pellatt (1830–1909), a Glasgow-born stockbroker in Toronto, and Emma Mary Pellatt (née Holland). His great-grandfather was the glassmaker Apsley Pellatt.

Pellatt had three sisters and two brothers, Fred Pellatt (grandfather of Toronto-based freelance writer John Pellatt) and Mill Pellatt (father of Mary Katherine Pellatt). The latter brother was paymaster of the Toronto Electric Light Company, a job obtained for him by Pellatt. His sisters were Mary Kate, Marian Maria and Emily Mountford Pellatt. One of his nieces, Beatrix Hamilton, was married to Canadian economist and humourist Stephen Leacock.

He was educated at Upper Canada College before leaving in 1876 to join his father's stock brokerage company, Pellatt and Osler, as a clerk. In 1882, Pellatt's father and Sir Edmund Boyd Osler parted ways, and Pellatt completed his apprenticeship and became a full member of the stock exchange. In the following year, Pellatt's father set up a partnership with his son under the name Pellatt and Pellatt.

Pellatt married twice, first to Mary Dodgson in Toronto in 1882 and, after Mary's death in 1924, to Catharine Welland Merritt in Toronto in 1927 (which lasted until her death in 1929). With his first wife, he had one son, Reginald Pellatt (1885–1967), who was a Colonel and married with no children.

== Military service and honours ==
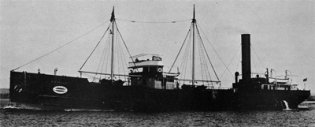
Pellatt was honoured by having a freighter named after him, in 1903.

Pellatt enlisted as a rifleman with The Queen's Own Rifles of Canada on 2 November 1876. He rose through the ranks and eventually became the commanding officer. In 1905, he was created a Knight Bachelor by King Edward VII for his service with The Queen's Own Rifles of Canada.

In 1910, Pellatt took the entire 600-man regiment (including its horses) to England for military training at his expense, to mark the Regiment's 50th anniversary. The military exercises lasted from August 13 to October 3, 1910.

Pellatt later served as the regiment's Honorary Colonel and was promoted to the rank of Major-General upon his retirement from the regiment. In addition, he was made a Commander of the Royal Victorian Order (CVO) in 1910.

From 1911 to 1923, he was the Knight Principal of the Imperial Society of Knights Bachelor.

== Later years ==
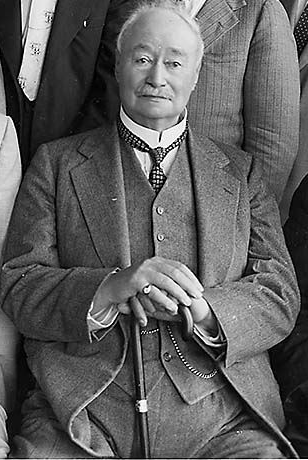
Pellatt around 1936.

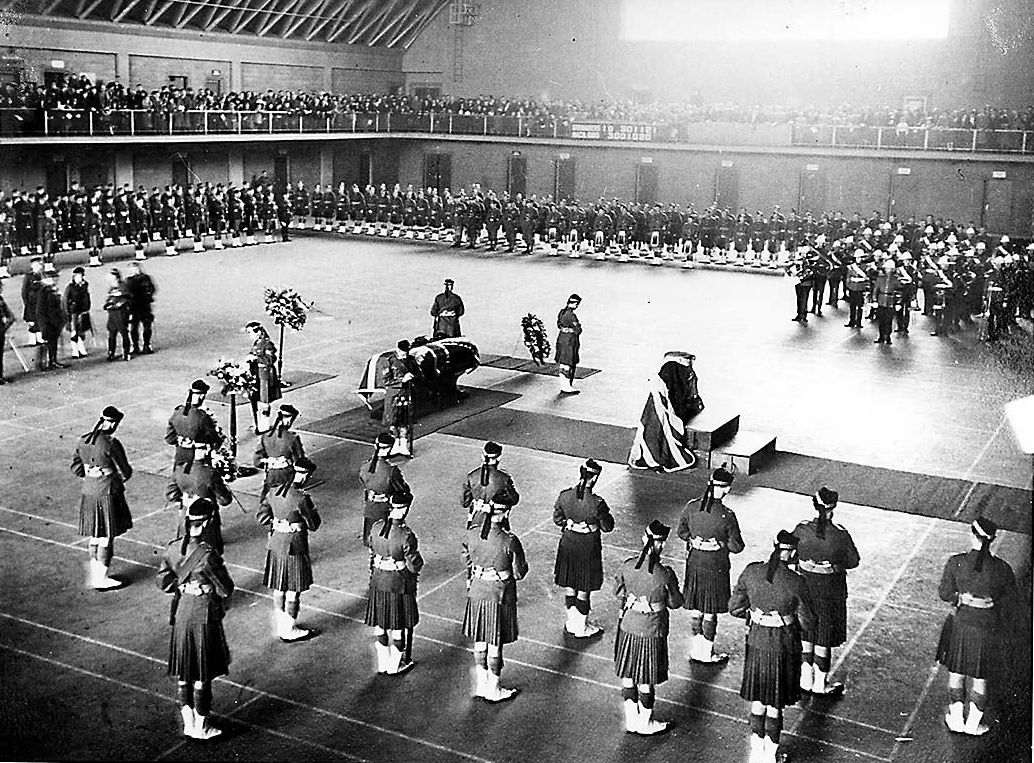
Pellatt's funeral at the Toronto Armouries in 1939.

Much of Pellatt's fortune was made through investments in the railway and hydro-electric industries in Canada, including the Toronto Electric Light Company. He also made significant investment in the Cobalt Lake Mining Company during the Cobalt silver rush of 1903. Later in around 1915, using riches from his Cobalt Lake Mining Company, he invested in the fledging McIntyre Mines in Timmins Ontario. However, legislator Adam Beck launched a campaign against the great industrialists of Canada, proclaiming that hydro power "should be as free as air". Through legislative process and by whipping up anti-rich sentiment, Beck was able to successfully appropriate Pellatt's life work and take his electric companies from him. Beck then led a populist revolt to raise Pellatt's taxes on his castle, Casa Loma, from $600 per year to $12,000. The strain of losing all of his income, coupled with the large increase in property taxes for his castle, led him to rely solely on his real estate investments, which were unsuccessful due to the beginning of the First World War. After the province expropriated his electrical power generating business, and his aircraft manufacturing business was appropriated by Beck as part of the war effort during the First World War, Pellatt was driven to near-bankruptcy, which forced him and Lady Pellatt to leave Casa Loma in 1923. They therefore moved to their farm at Marylake in King City.

Prior to building Casa Loma, Pellatt sold his summer retreat in Blantyre / Fallingbrook area of southwest Scarborough to his son Reginald and other parts of the estate to others; Chateau des Quatre Vents at 3025 Queen Street East was built in 1892 by William T. Murray on land acquired from Pellatt former summer estate. E.J. Lennox built another home in front of 3025 and signed as 3027 Queen Street East in 1910. The estate was once on land owned by Peter Patterson and before that Clergy Reserve. Only the groundskeeper home remains and rest of the estate redeveloped into residential homes. His summer estate was destroyed in a fire in the 1920s.

Pellatt later built Bailey House in Mimico, at the bend in Lake Shore near Fleeceline, overlooking the commercial stretch on Lake Shore (the house later became a Legion Hall and was demolished to make way for a roadway). He subsequently moved in with his chauffeur, Thomas Ridgway, and it was in this house that Pellatt died.

After he died on March 8, 1939, thousands of people lined Toronto streets to witness his funeral procession, and he was buried with full military honours. He is interred at Forest Lawn Mausoleum, north of Toronto.

His life has been featured in the film The Pellatt Newsreel, which aired on the Biography Channel and was nominated for a 2009 Gemini for Best Biography Documentary. The film, narrated by Colin Mochrie, is shown continuously in the theatre at Casa Loma, which is located where the swimming pool was planned to be.

Several biographies have been written about Pellatt. In particular, Carlie Oreskovich's The King of Casa Loma gives a detailed and thorough account. His first wife's great-grandniece, Trelawny Linda Howell, also curates a website dedicated to his memory, CasaLomaTrust.ca.

== See also ==
- Robert Baden-Powell, 1st Baron Baden-Powell

Preceded by Sir Bargrave Deane	Knight Principal of the Imperial Society of Knights Bachelor; 1911–1923	Succeeded by Sir William Bull, 1st Baronet
