= Robert John Fleming (Canadian politician) =

Canadian politician (1854–1925)

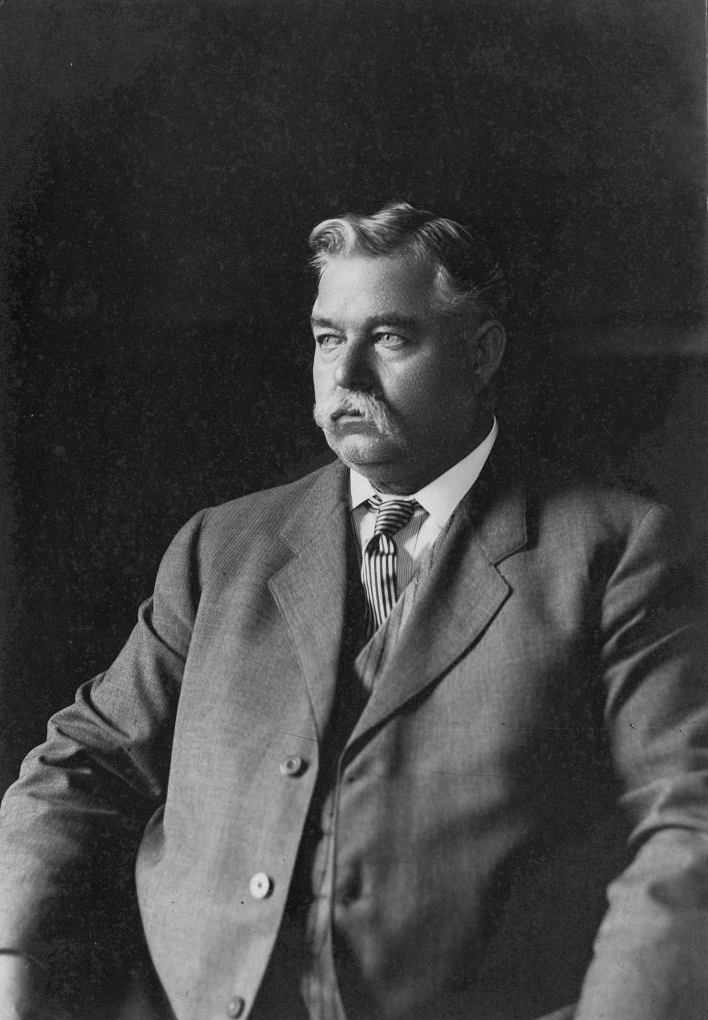

27th Mayor of Toronto
- In office 1892–1893
- Preceded by: Edward F. Clarke
- Succeeded by: Warring Kennedy
- In office 1896–1897
- Preceded by: Warring Kennedy
- Succeeded by: John Shaw

Toronto St. David's Ward Alderman
- In office 1886–1890

Personal details
- Born: November 23, 1854 Toronto, Ontario, Canada
- Died: October 26, 1925 (aged 70)
- Spouse(s): Margaret Jane Breadon (1879–1883); Lydia Jane Orford (1888–?)
- Occupation: Businessman, politician
- Profession: Businessman

Robert John Fleming (November 23, 1854 – October 26, 1925) was twice Mayor of Toronto (1892–1893 and 2nd incumbency 1896–1897)

Born in Toronto, Robert John Fleming was of Irish ancestry, the son of William and Jane (Cauldwell) Fleming. Educated in Toronto public schools he first entered the business world in real estate.

From there he moved on to the Toronto Railway Company becoming the general manager in 1905. Fleming believed every child should learn to swim to prevent drownings, and provided "free bathing cars;" special summer streetcars on every route the TRC operated to get children to swimming stations at Sunnyside, the Lower Don River, Fisherman's Island, and the Western Sandbar.

Fleming's political career began as an Alderman for the Ward of St. David's 1886 to 1890. In 1892 Toronto municipal election, he was elected mayor of Toronto. He was defeated in 1894 and 1895 but was returned to office in the 1896 Toronto municipal election and again the next year. He resigned in 1897 to accept appointment as an assessment commissioner of Toronto and held that position until 1904. In 1894, he presided over the National Exhibition Convention at Montreal. Fleming was president in 1895 of the Dominion Prohibitory Alliance. He strongly believed in the prohibition of liquor traffic.

Fleming resigned as Mayor in 1897 and ran for mayor again in the 1923 Toronto municipal election against Mayor Charles A. Maguire and was defeated.

As a businessman he was general manager of the Toronto and Niagara Power Company, general manager of the Toronto Electric Light Company and general manager of the Electrical Development Company of Ontario. He was also director of the Toronto Board of Trade. He was a member of the Toronto Harbor Commission in 1921, and a member of the Orange Order in Canada.

Fleming purchased Donlands Farm from William Findlay Maclean in 1922. The farm remained in the family until the late 1950s, when the property was incorporated into a new North York development called Flemingdon Park.

Arjay Crescent in Toronto was also named in his honour at the request of his son, G.O. Fleming.

== Personal life ==
He married (first) in December 1879 Margaret Jane Breadon, who died in March 1883; she was the daughter of Christopher Breadon of Montreal. His second marriage in October 1888 was to Lydia Jane Orford, daughter of William Orford of Toronto. He was the father of four sons and five daughters. Fleming had an active interest in thoroughbred horses.

Robert John Fleming died in 1925 and was buried in Mount Pleasant Cemetery, Toronto.
