= 1894 Toronto municipal election =

Municipal elections were held in Toronto, Canada, on January 1, 1894. Warring Kennedy was elected, defeating Mayor Robert John Fleming, who was seeking a third term. Kennedy's upset was credited to the increased turnout by Methodists due to the plebiscite on Prohibition as well as the strong organized support for Kennedy by the Protestant Protective Association and the Orange Order.

== Toronto mayor ==
Results
Warring Kennedy - 13,830
Robert John Fleming (incumbent) - 9,306

== Plebiscite ==
Under the Prohibition Plebiscite Act, a plebiscite was held across the province, in conjunction with municipal elections, on the prohibition of the importation, manufacture, and sale alcohol. For this plebiscite, unmarried women, and widows, were allowed to vote - approximately 5,000 women in Toronto - of which 1,117 did so. Men and women were given different colours, which were counted separately. The plebiscite did not result in the enactment of prohibition legislation by the province, however, as in 1896, the Judicial Committee of the Privy Council disallowed provincial authority over the importation of alcohol.

Prohibition
For - 10,532 (men); 875 (women) - 11,407 (total)
Against - 8,637 (men); 242 (women) - 8,879 (total)

== Aldermen elected to City Council ==
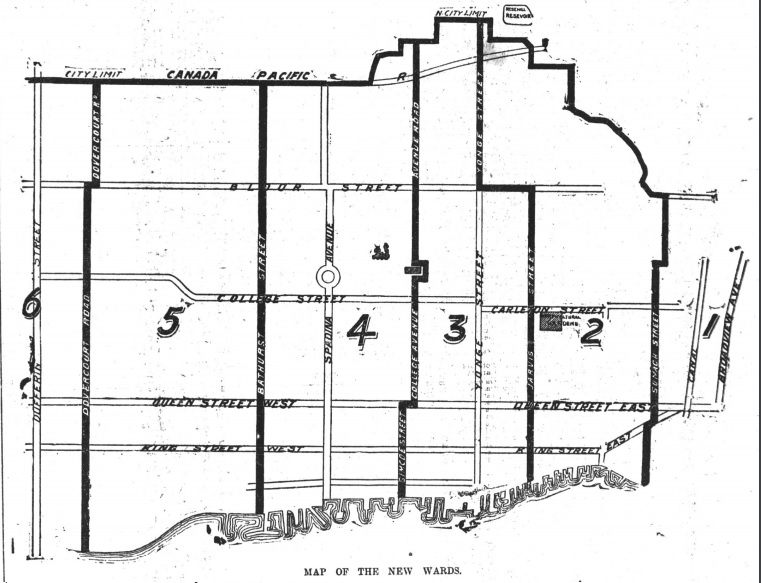
Map of Toronto's six wards (1892-1909), published in The Globe, 1 January 1892.

Four alderman were elected to sit on Toronto City Council in each of six wards. Seven aldermen from the outgoing Toronto City Council retired while 17 sought re-election. Of those, 12 were re-elected and five were defeated.

First Ward
W.T. Stewart (incumbent) - 1,098
Thomas Allen - 1,024
H.R. Frankland - 927
C.C. Small (incumbent) - 905
Peter Macdonald - 901
John Knox Leslie (incumbent) - 862
Ernest A. Macdonald - 805
E.A. Forster - 580
Thomas Davies (incumbent) - 536
S.A. Heakes - 336

Second Ward
John Hallam (incumbent) - 1,997
Daniel Lamb (incumbent) - 1,942
Thomas Hewitt (incumbent) - 1,401
P.H. Drayton - 1,065
George Anderson - 1,029
Thomas Foster - 1,027
Francis Stephens Spence - 1,020
Daniel Kelly - 936
David Carlyle - 892
Adam Beatty - 434

Third Ward
John Shaw (incumbent) - 3,649
George McMurrich (incumbent) - 2,472
J. Enoch Thompson - 2,117
O.B. Sheppard - 1,887
R.L. Fraser - 1,726
Richard John Score - 1,616
W.R. Clarke - 886
C.A. Muerrie - 305

Fourth Ward
William Burns (incumbent) - 2,011
Wm. P. Hubbard - 1,993
James Jolliffe (incumbent) - 1,600
James Crane - 1,458
George Verral (incumbent) - 1,381
W.G. Harris - 1,123
John McCaffrey - 1,014
M. B. Alison - 986
Alex R. Williamson - 960
John Ward - 511
John Dill - 340

Fifth Ward
Thomas Crawford (incumbent) - 2,671
John Bailey (incumbent) - 2,015
John Dunn - 1,960
Andrew Bates - 1,635
Daniel Kennedy - 841
Francis H. Woods - 821
Alanson Cody Winton - 481
John Aldridge - 349
William J. Smith - 282
J.B. Hay - 116
Lindsay - 30

Sixth Ward
W.F. Atkinson 1,212
John J. Graham 1,105
James Gowanlock - 897
Thomas Murray (incumbent) - 894
J.E. Verral (incumbent) - 732
John Maloney (incumbent) - 719
Sturgeon Stewart - 699
H.M. East - 643
Charles L. Denison - 592
John F. McCrae - 583

Source: and
