= 1897 Toronto municipal election =

Municipal elections were held in Toronto, Canada, on January 4, 1897. Mayor Robert John Fleming was re-elected, defeating Alderman George McMurrich. Fleming's principal campaign pledge was a promise to build a bridge to extend the street railway system to the Toronto Islands, as well as readjusting water rates and reorganizing the boards of education. This was Fleming's fourth mayoral victory, his second in a row. He pledged that this would be his final term in office

== Toronto mayor ==
Results
Robert John Fleming (incumbent) - 11,960
George McMurrich - 10,375

== Board of Control ==
The Toronto Board of Control was elected by Toronto City Council from among its members, and presided over by the mayor. At the first council meeting following the general election, council chose Aldermen Graham, Lamb, and Leslie to sit on the body, presided over by the mayor.

== Plebiscites ==
A plebiscite was held on authorizing the spending of $275,000 on the completion of the municipal court house and $26,000 for a water main on Front Street. There was also a vote on moving future elections to New Year's Day.

Court House
Yea - 4,635
Nay - 2,196

Water Main
Yea - 4,233
Nay - 2,573

New Year's Day election date
Yea - 16,465
Nay - 4,802

== Aldermen elected to City Council ==
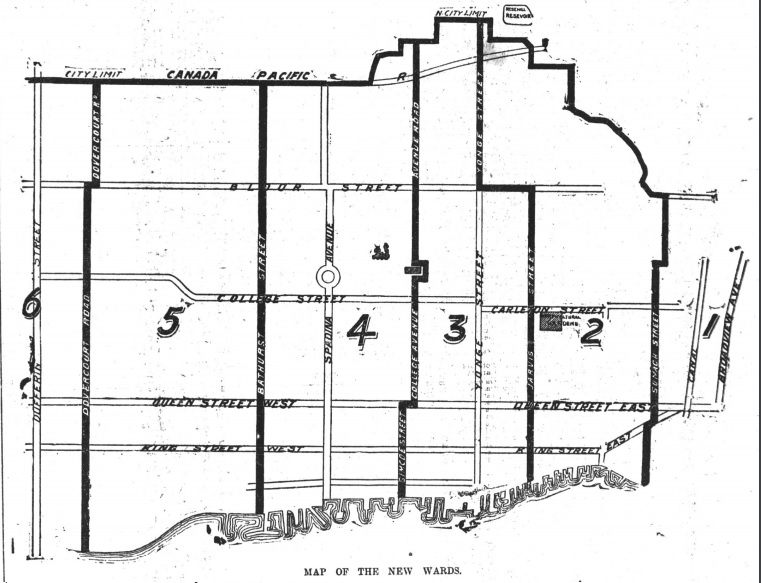
Map of Toronto's six wards (1892-1909), published in The Globe, 1 January 1892.

Four alderman were elected to sit on Toronto City Council in each of six wards. Six incumbent aldermen were defeated in the election.

First Ward
John Russell (incumbent) - 950
Thomas Allen (incumbent) - 944
John Knox Leslie (incumbent) - 936
James Frame - 907
T.S. Lobb - 886
C.C. Small (incumbent) - 728
Samuel H. Defries - 546
Elgin Schoff - 434
Ed Blong - 420
T.E. Washington - 411
George Wellings - 321
Thomas Cummings - 125

Second Ward
John Hallam (incumbent) - 1,693
Francis S. Spence (incumbent) - 1,687
Daniel Lamb (incumbent) - 1,371
William L. Beale - 1,281
Thomas Bryce - 1,242
Thomas Davies (incumbent) - 1,207
Thomas Foster - 1,131
P.H. Drayton - 1,114
Dr. Samuel Thompson - 946
David Carlyle - 814

Third Ward
A.F. Rutter - 2,856
John Shaw - 2,856
O.B. Sheppard (incumbent) - 2,827
Bernard Saunders (incumbent) - 2,718
James B. Boustead (incumbent) -2,001
Ernest A. Macdonald - 991
John S. Lucas - 686

Fourth Ward
Wm. P. Hubbard (incumbent) - 2,798
Wm. Burns (incumbent) - 2,621
James Crane (incumbent) - 1,777
William Carlyle - 1,543
James Jolliffe (incumbent) -1,354
H.E. Trent - 1,291
F.W. Unitt - 1,221
J.E. Verral - 941
Robert P. Hall - 536
James Langdon - 340
D.H. Watt - 89

Fifth Ward
Robt. H. Graham (incumbent) - 2,042
W.T.R. Preston (incumbent) - 1,778
Francis H. Woods - 1,746
John Dunn (incumbent) - 1,643
William Bell (incumbent) - 1,609
A.R. Denison - 1,412

Sixth Ward
James Gowanlock (incumbent) - 1,566
James Scott (incumbent) - 1,153
John J. Graham (incumbent) - 1,042
Adam Lynd M.D. - 947
James M. Bowman - 931
J. Harvey Hall - 834
Hugh MacMath - 751
George Gilbert Rowe (incumbent) - 518
Joseph Pocock - 500

Source: and
