= Casa Loma =

Mansion in Toronto, Canada

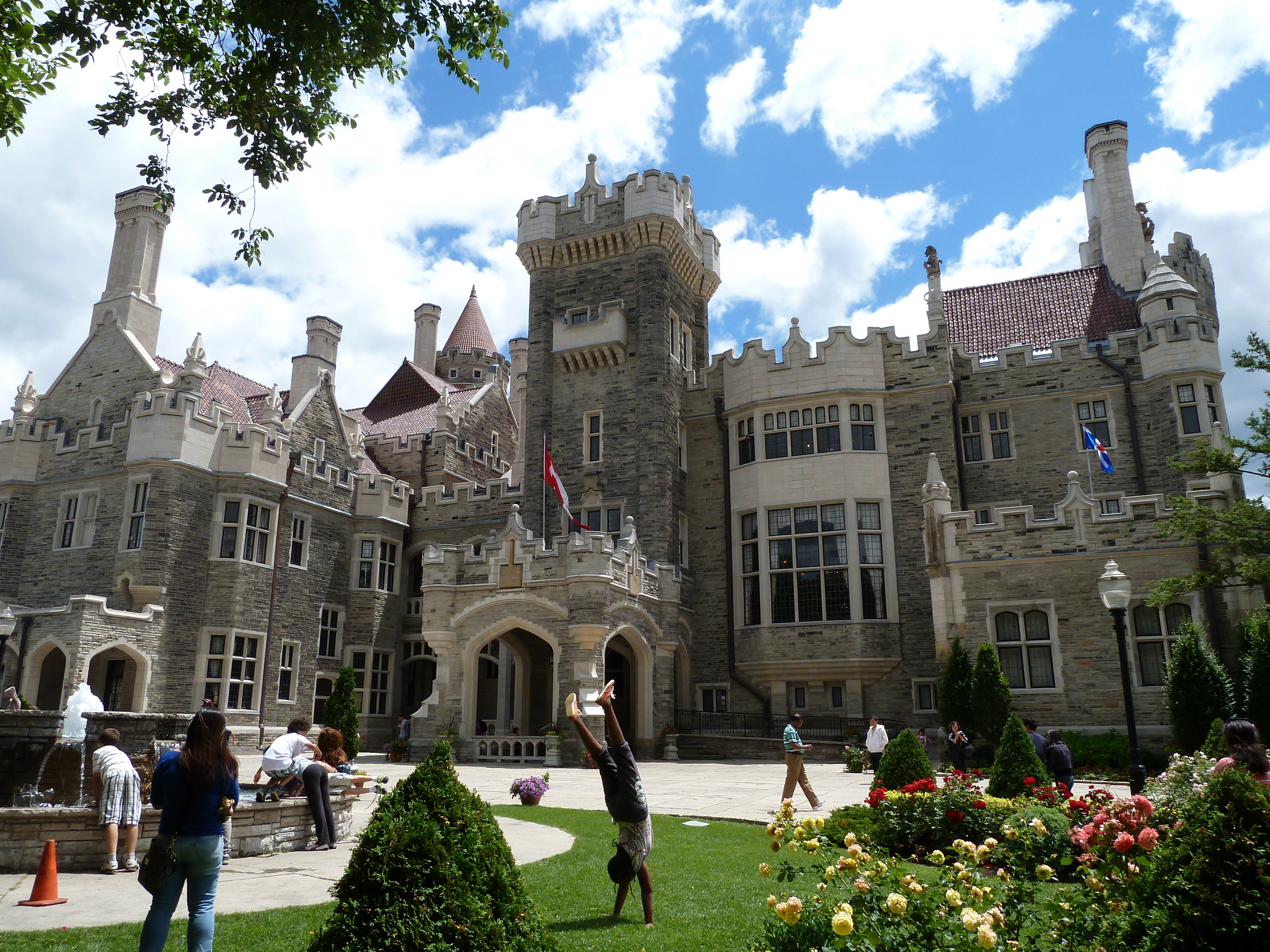
- Exterior of Casa Loma in 2012

General information
- Type: Mansion; established as a museum in 1937
- Architectural style: Gothic Revival
- Location: 1 Austin Terrace; Toronto, Ontario; M5R 1X8
- Coordinates: 43.6781°N 79.4095°W
- Current tenants: Liberty Entertainment Group (since 2014)
- Construction started: 1911
- Completed: 1914
- Cost: CA$5.4M
- Client: Sir Henry Pellatt
- Owner: City of Toronto

Dimensions
- Other dimensions: Grounds: 343,253 sqft

Technical details
- Floor count: 7 floors
- Floor area: 64,700 sq.ft.

Design and construction
- Architect: E. J. Lennox

Ontario Heritage Act
- Official name: Casa Loma
- Type: Designated Part IV (Heritage Property)
- Designated: 1987

Casa Loma (Spanish for "Hill House") is a Gothic Revival castle-style mansion and garden in midtown Toronto, Ontario, Canada, that is now a historic house museum and landmark. It was constructed from 1911 to 1914 as a residence for financier Sir Henry Pellatt. The architect was E. J. Lennox, who designed several other city landmarks. Casa Loma sits at an elevation of 140 metres (460 ft) above sea level, 66 metres (217 ft) above Lake Ontario.

Due to its unique architectural character in Toronto, Casa Loma has been a popular filming location for movies and television. It is also a popular venue for wedding ceremonies, and Casa Loma can be rented in the evenings after the museum closes to the public.

== History ==
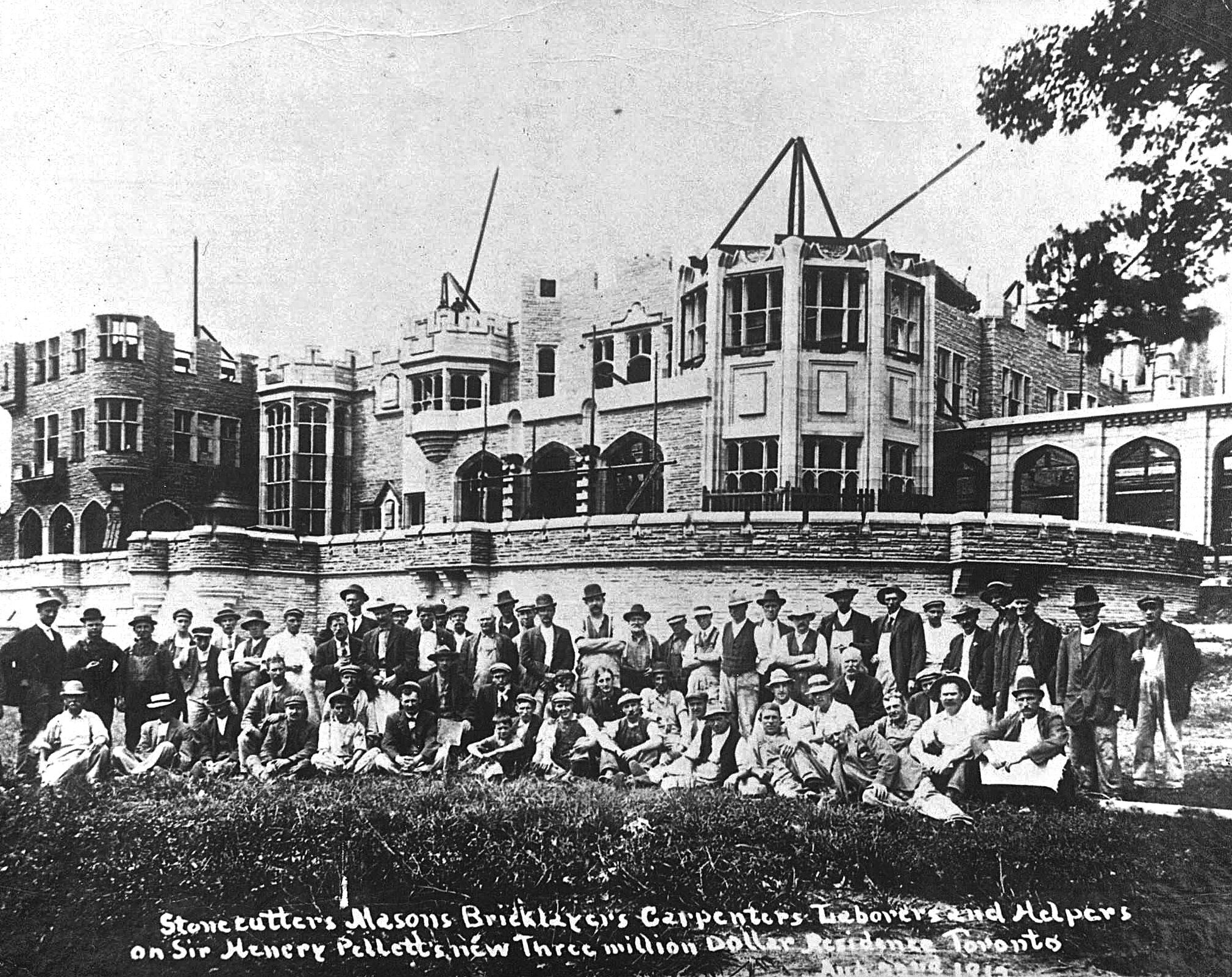
Construction of Casa Loma, c. 1912

In 1903, financier Henry Pellatt purchased 25 lots from developers Kertland and Rolf. Pellatt commissioned architect E. J. Lennox to design Casa Loma, with construction beginning in 1911, starting with the massive stables, potting shed and Hunting Lodge (a.k.a. coach-house) a few hundred feet north of the main building. The Hunting Lodge is a two-storey 4,380-square-foot (407 m^{2}) house with servants' quarters. As soon as the stable complex was completed, Pellatt sold his summer house in Scarborough (burned down in the 1920s but the Lennox designed groundskeeper's home at 12 Courcelette Road remains) to his son and moved to the Hunting Lodge. The stables were used as a construction site for the mansion (and also served as the quarters for the male servants), with some of the machinery still remaining in the rooms under the stables.

The house cost about $3.5 million (equivalent to $99.8 million in 2025) and took 299 workers three years to build. Due to the start of World War I, construction was halted. At 98 rooms covering 64,700 square feet, it was the largest private residence in Canada. Notable amenities included an elevator, an oven large enough to cook an ox, two vertical passages for pipe organs, a central vacuum, two secret passages in Pellatt's ground-floor office, a pool, and three bowling lanes in the basement (the last two were never completed).

Most of the third floor was left unfinished, and today serves as the Regimental Museum for The Queen's Own Rifles of Canada. Pellatt joined the regiment as a rifleman and rose through the ranks to become the commanding officer. He was knighted for his dedication to the regiment. Pellatt later served as the honorary colonel and was promoted to major-general upon retirement.

During the depression that followed the war, the City of Toronto increased Casa Loma's property taxes from $600 per year to $1,000 a month, and Pellatt, already experiencing financial difficulties, auctioned off $1.5 million in art and $250,000 in furnishings. Pellatt was able to enjoy life in the mansion for less than ten years, leaving in 1923.

In late 1920s, investors operated Casa Loma for a short time as a luxury hotel. During Prohibition, it became a popular nightspot for wealthy Americans. The Orange Blossoms, later known as Glen Gray and the Casa Loma Orchestra, played there for eight months in 1927–1928. Shortly thereafter, they went on a tour of North America and became a major swing era dance band.

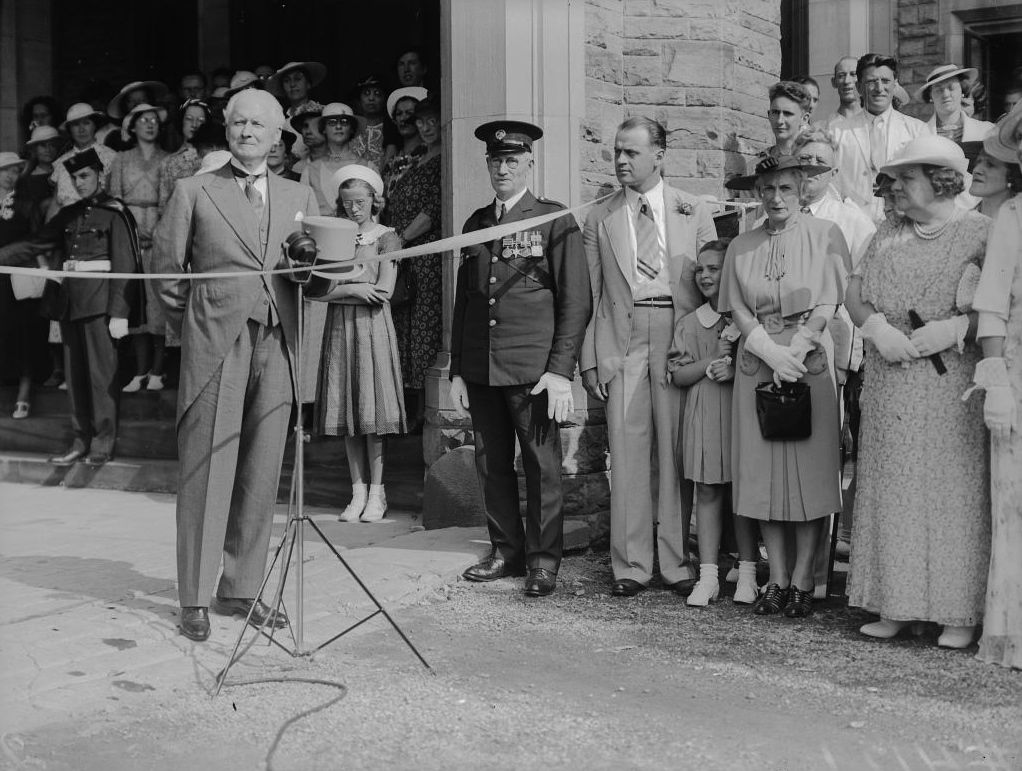
Lieutenant-Governor Herbert Bruce opens Casa Loma to the public, 1937.

The city seized Casa Loma in 1924 for unpaid taxes, and for years, the building was left vacant. In the 1930s, CFRB broadcaster Claire Wallace spent a night at Casa Loma to gather material for a story about ghosts and supernatural phenomena, and she later broadcast an appeal to save the building from demolition. Her broadcast was heard by the vice-president of a local Kiwanis Club, and subsequently Casa Loma was leased in 1937 by the Kiwanis Club of West Toronto, later the Kiwanis Club of Casa Loma (KCCL), which began operating the mansion under a sole-source contract as a tourist destination.

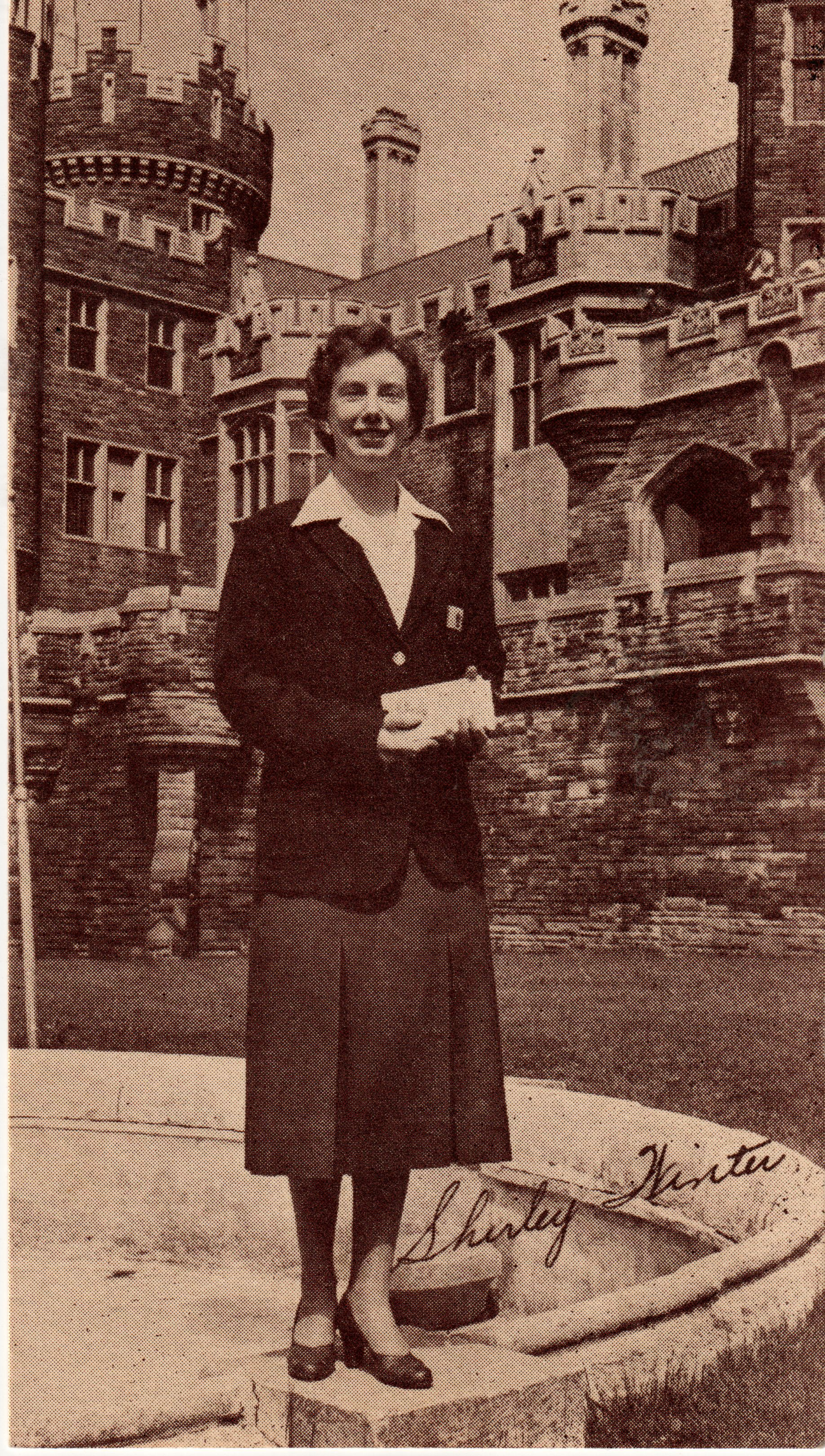
Tour guide stands in front of Casa Loma in the mid twentieth century

During World War II, the stables were used to conceal research and production of sonar, and for construction of sonar devices (known as ASDIC) for U-boat detection, according to a book about the "castle". The area was closed, behind an "Under Repairs" sign. The suggestion that the stables were under renovation allowed workers of the secret facility to come and go without suspicion. Casa Loma is often claimed to be the location of Station M that manufactured covert devices for agents, claiming that the book Inside Camp X provides this information. In 2015, however, author Lynn Philip Hodgson rejected this in an interview with the Toronto Star. "Nobody knows where Station M was. You won't read where it was in any book."

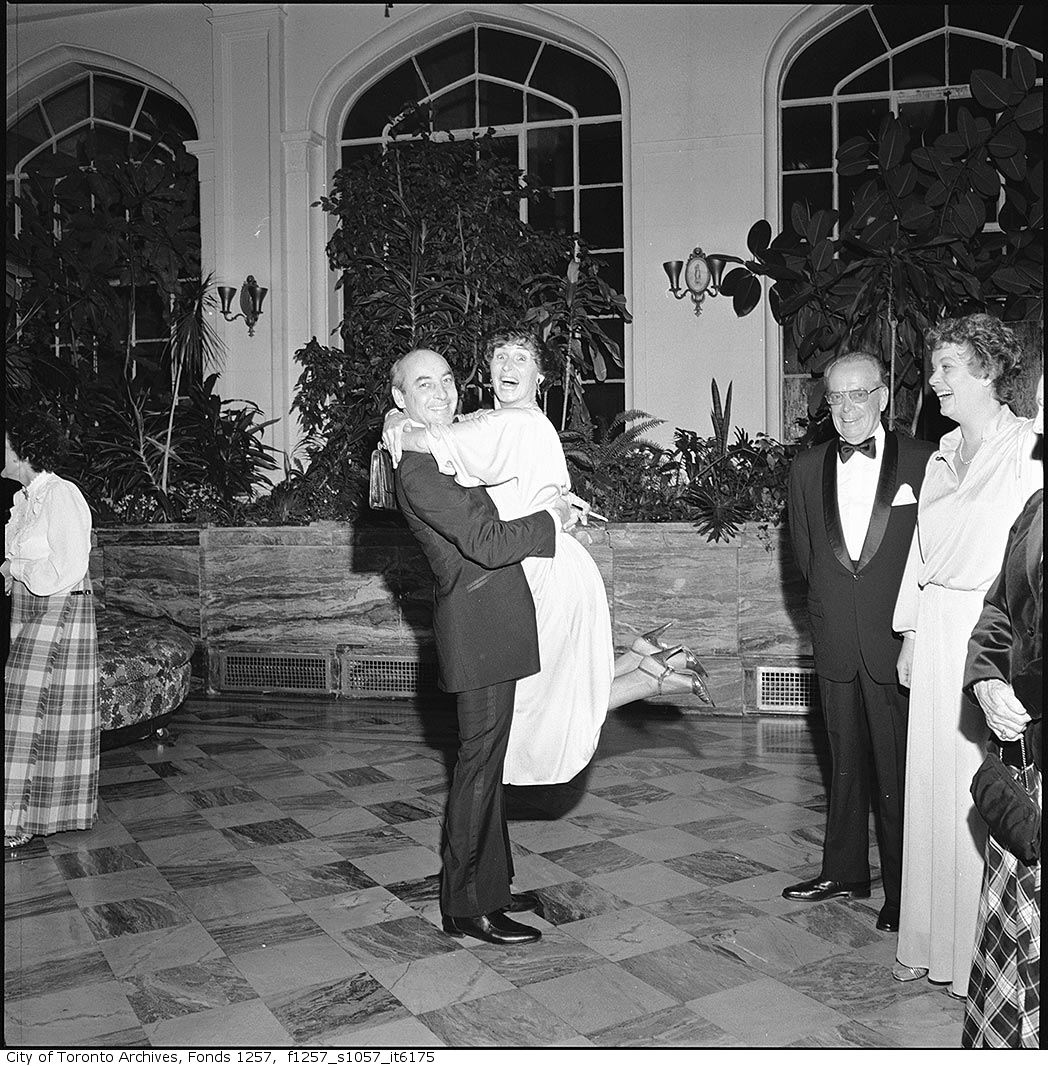
Gooderham & Worts dinner party at Casa Loma in 1976. The property was operated by the Kiwanis Club of Casa Loma from 1937 to 2011.

KCCL managed Casa Loma for 74 years, until 2011. Its tenure was not without controversy, with Pellatt's great-grandniece Trelawny Howell starting a campaign for an open-tender lease process in 2005, and the organization disputing her relationship with Pellatt in 2010. A 2006 advisory committee led by former MPP Ron Kanter, and its subsequent reports, recommended that the city turn the mansion's management over to a new "Casa Loma Trust". However, a city manager's report in 2008 recommended extending the city's lease with KCCL for 20 years, and in July 2008, it was renewed.

Meanwhile, from 1997 until 2012, the mansion underwent a 15-year, $33-million exterior restoration largely funded by the city, which also created a new board of trustees in 2008, including seven KCCL members and seven city appointees. The city's renewed management agreement included a stipulation that KCCL would use the mansion's net revenues to help pay for upgrades; however, the organization used the fund to cover operating shortfalls instead, and there was only $335,000 in the account by 2011, rather than the $1.5-million originally projected. As a result, in 2011, the city temporarily resumed management of Casa Loma and began welcoming bids from the private sector in its search for a new operator.

In January 2014, the city entered a new long-term lease and operating agreement with Liberty Entertainment Group, led by President and CEO Nick Di Donato, which agreed to spend $7.4 million to continue the mansion's upgrades. The company's plans also included a fine dining facility. The restaurant, Blueblood Steakhouse, opened in summer 2017.

== Architecture ==
Sir Henry imported artisans from Europe to design much of the furniture and other features of the mansion. Casa Loma has five acres of gardens. A tunnel connects Casa Loma to the Hunting Lodge and to the stables (garage, potting shed, stalls, carriage room, and tack rooms).

=== Oak Room ===
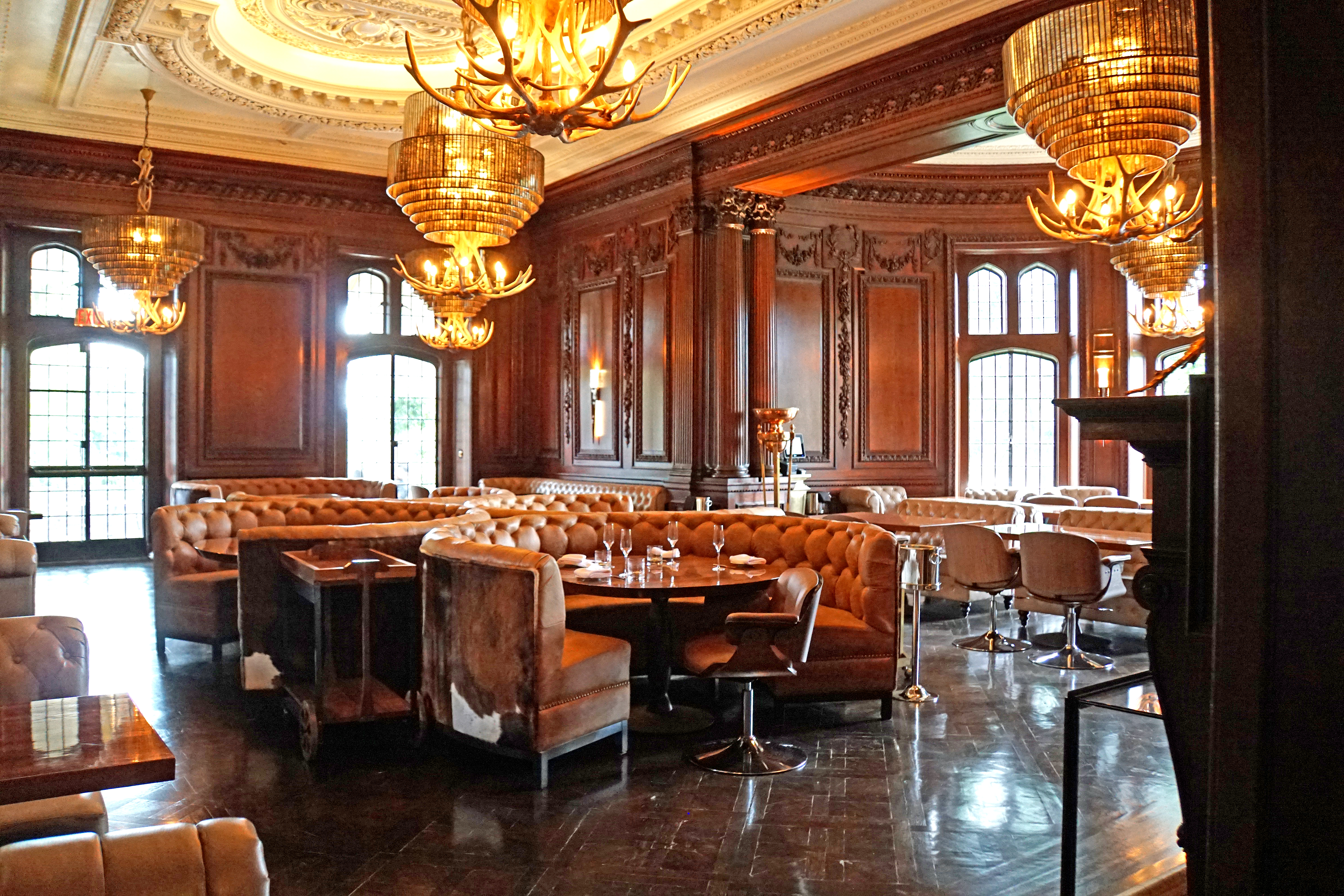
The Oak Room is considered the most decorated room in the house.

The Oak Room (originally called the Napoleon Drawing Room) is the most decorated room in the house, and was used for formal occasions. It is encased in wood panels in the style of Grinling Gibbons, which took three artisans three years to carve. The highly ornamented plaster ceiling was made by Italian craftsmen, and was enhanced by the use of indirect lighting in the ceiling. Among other fixtures, the room featured a 10 feet (3.0 m) high Louis XVI style faux-gilt carved light standard with 24 bulbs.

=== Other rooms ===
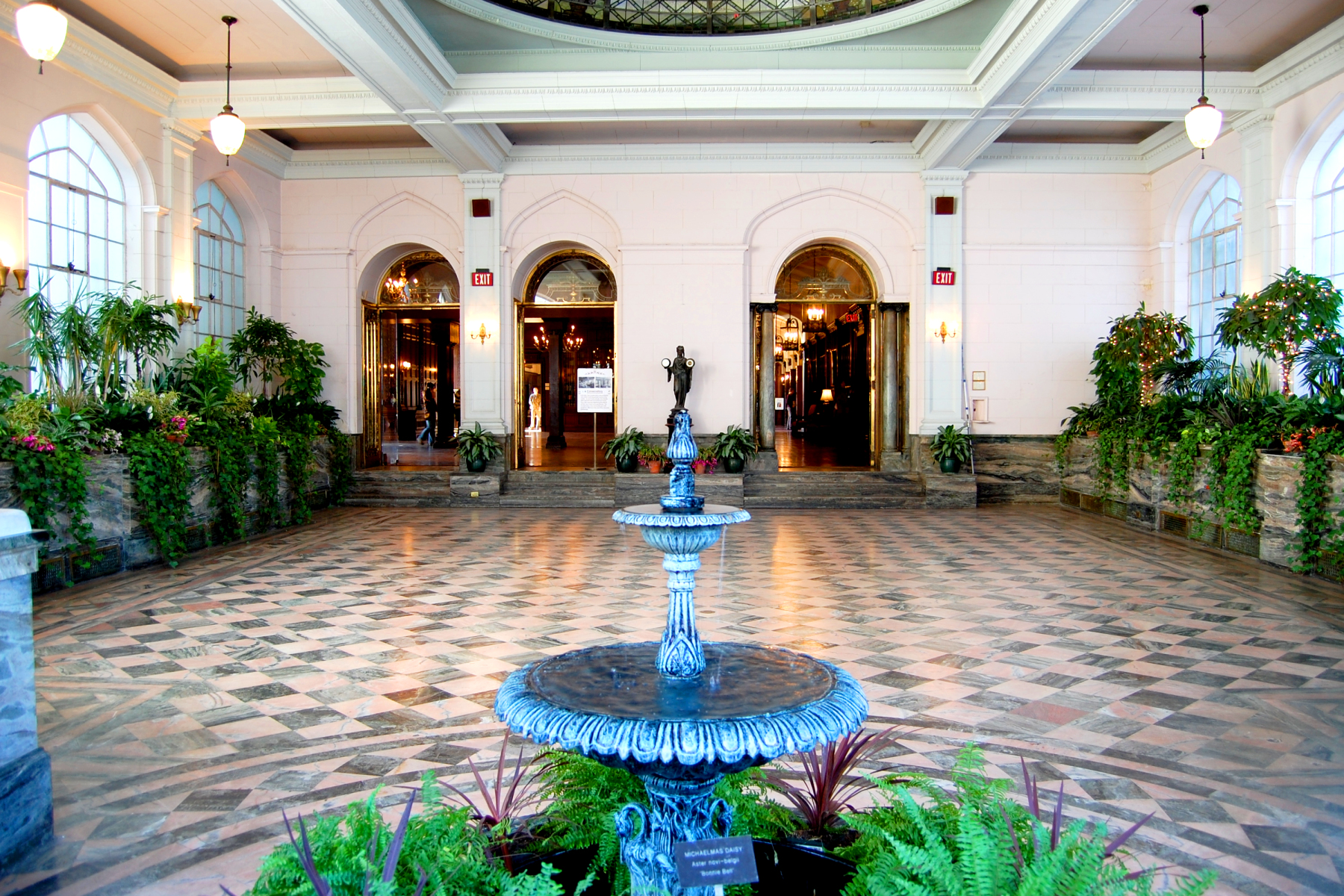
The Conservatory is located on the main floor of the building.

Other rooms in Casa Loma include The Conservatory, a room that showcases plant life. The Conservatory also includes a fountain at one end of the room. The Round Room is designed to fit beneath the mansion's tower; this room is notable for its doors and windows, which curve to follow the shape of the room.

==== Main floor ====
- Billiards Room
- The Conservatory
- Dining Room
- Great Hall
- Library
- Oak Room
- Peacock Alley
- Sir Henry's Study
- Serving Room
- Smoking Room

==== Second floor ====
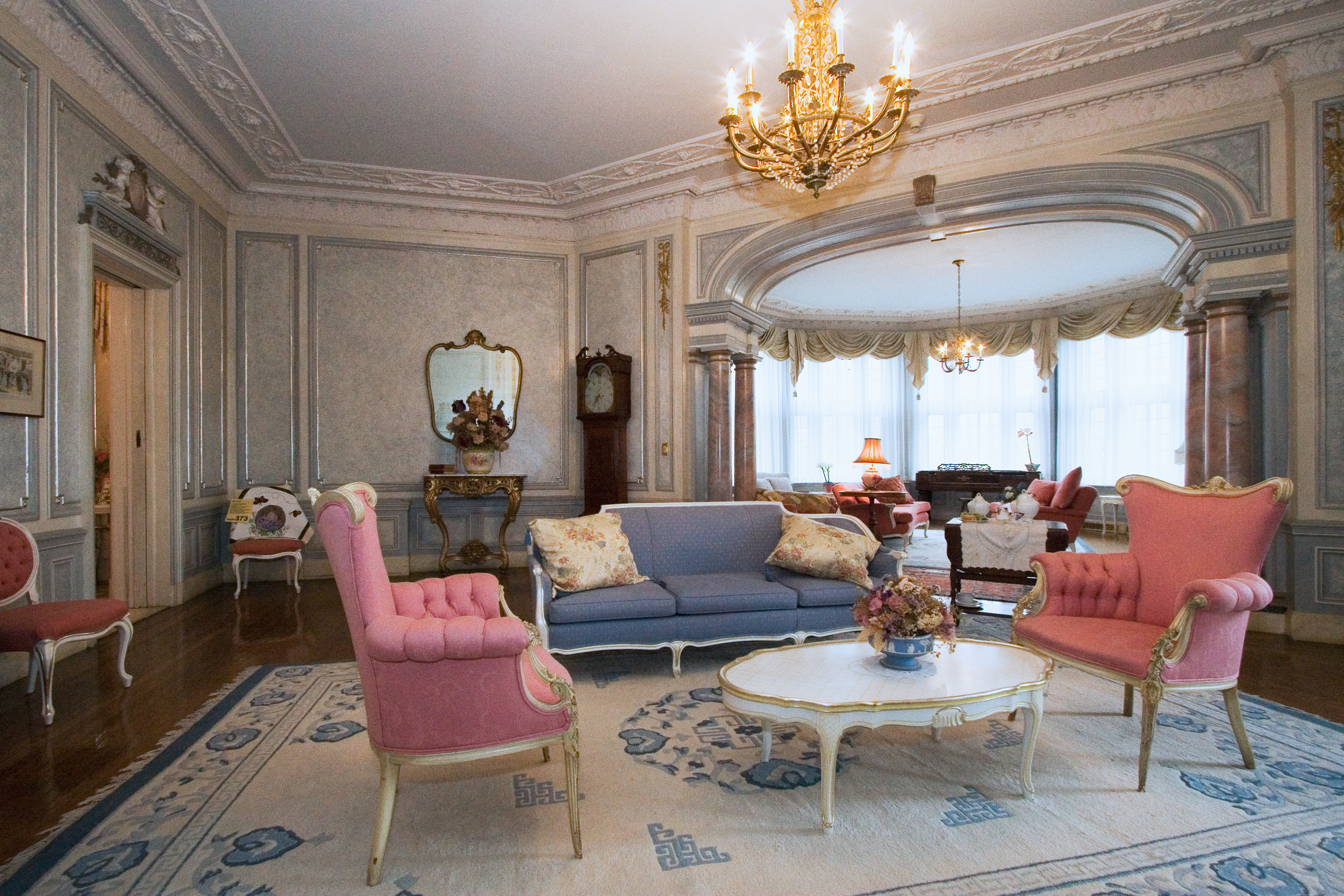
Lady Pellatt's Suite is located on the second floor of Casa Loma.

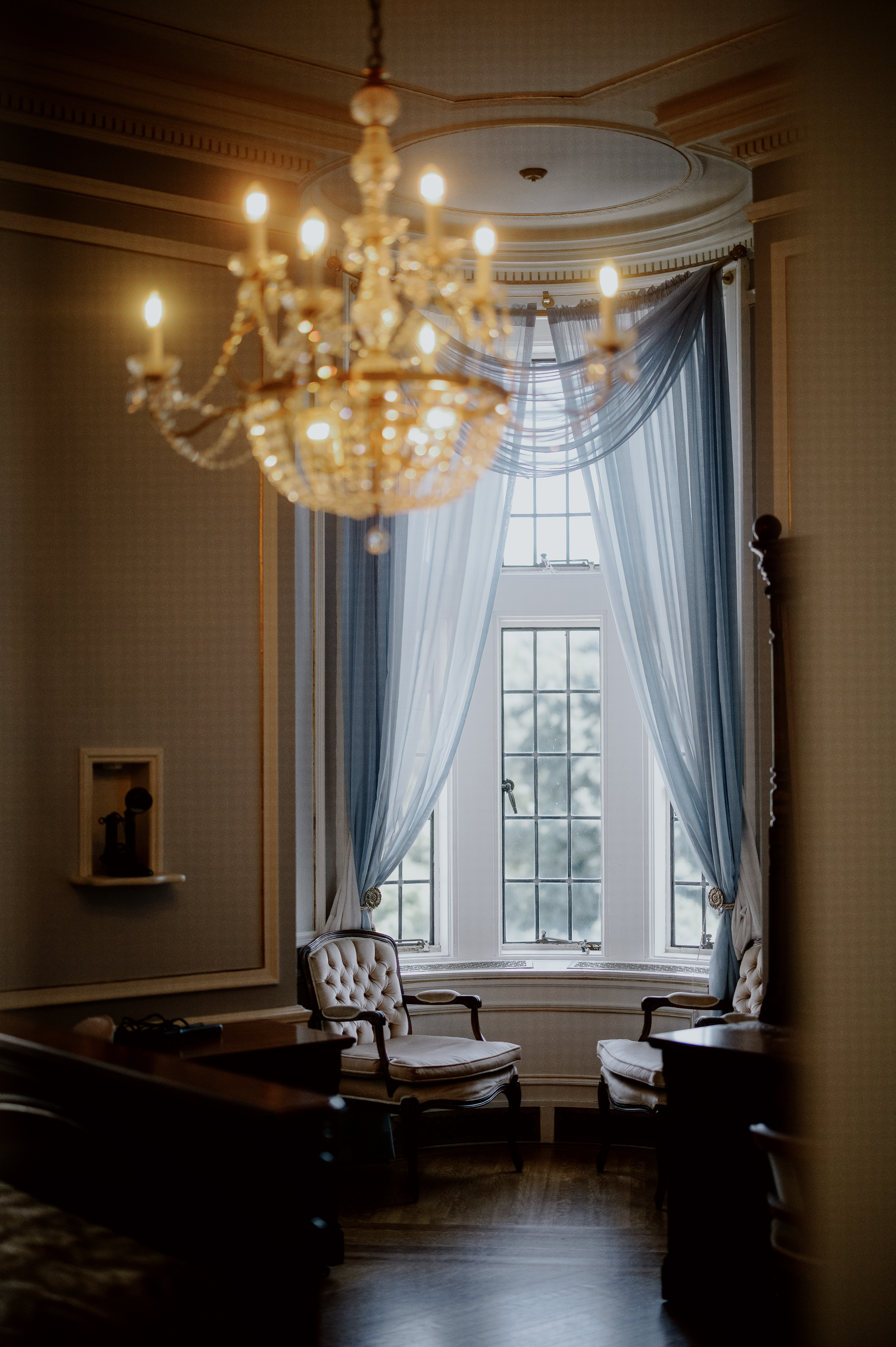
Bridal Suite at Casa Loma

- Sir Henry's Suite
- Sir Henry's Bathroom
- Lady Pellatt's Suite
- Lady Pellatt's Bathroom
- Girl Guides Exhibit
- Guest Suite
- Windsor Room
- Round Room

==== Third floor ====
- The Queen's Own Rifles of Canada Regimental Museum
- The 2 Intelligence Company and Camp X Museum
- Stairs to Towers
- The Kiwanis Room
- The Garden Room
- Servant's Room
- The Austin Room

==== Basement ====
- Gift Shop (Bowling lanes and shooting range - never completed)
- Castle Café (Gymnasium - never completed)
- Swimming Pool (Never completed)
- Wine Cellar
- Tunnel to Hunting Lodge and Stables

==== Stables ====
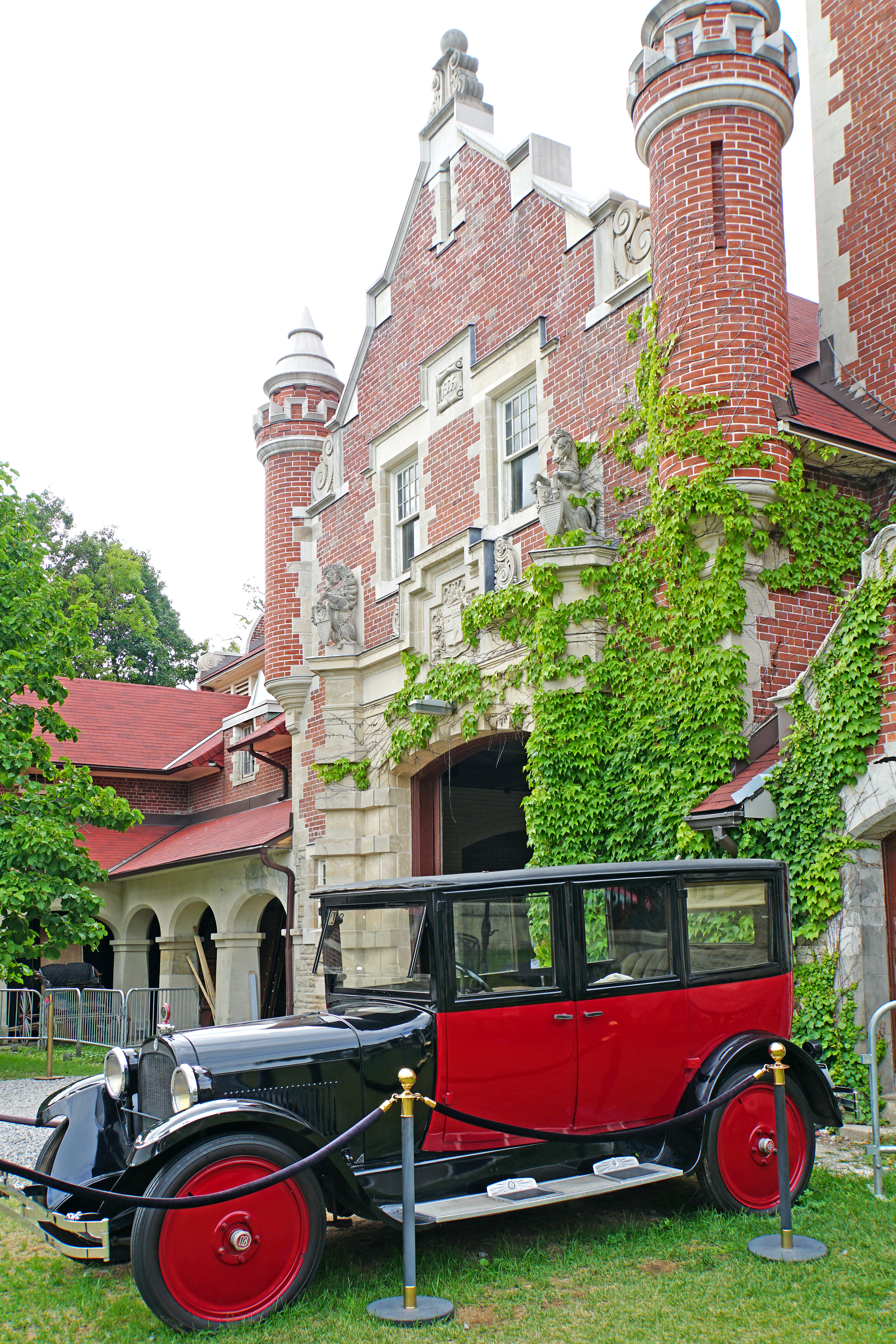
The Stables at Casa Loma hosts a vintage car exhibition in the Carriage Room.

- Garage
- Potting Shed
- Standing Stalls with horses' names and box stalls
- Carriage Room
- Tack Rooms
- Hunting Lodge

==== Exterior ====
- Gardens
- Parking lots

== Exhibits ==
=== Queen's Own Rifles of Canada Regimental Museum ===
In 1970, the regimental museum of the Queen's Own Rifles of Canada was moved from Currie Barracks, Calgary to Casa Loma in commemoration of Sir Henry Pellatt and his dedication to the regiment. The museum occupies much of the third floor of the building, with records and artifacts on display going back to the regiment's formation in 1860.

=== Girl Guide exhibit ===
The Girl Guide Exhibit was opened on the second floor of Casa Loma in 1973. The relationship between the Girl Guides and Casa Loma extends back to Lady Pellatt, who frequently invited the Girl Guides to her home. Their first visit was in 1913, when 250 girls and their leaders toured the conservatories and stables, climbed the circular staircase to the top turret and then were served tea in the Palm Room. In March 1914, Lady Pellatt watched the Guides' annual fête from her bedroom window as she was too ill to leave her room. Rallies became an annual event at the house. Guides also skated on the house's curling rink in winter. Girl Guiding events have continued in recent years, including the 75th anniversary and the 100th anniversary celebrations of Guiding in Canada were held at Casa Loma.

=== Vintage car exhibition ===
As of 2014, the garage and carriage room feature an exhibition of vintage cars from the early 1900s.

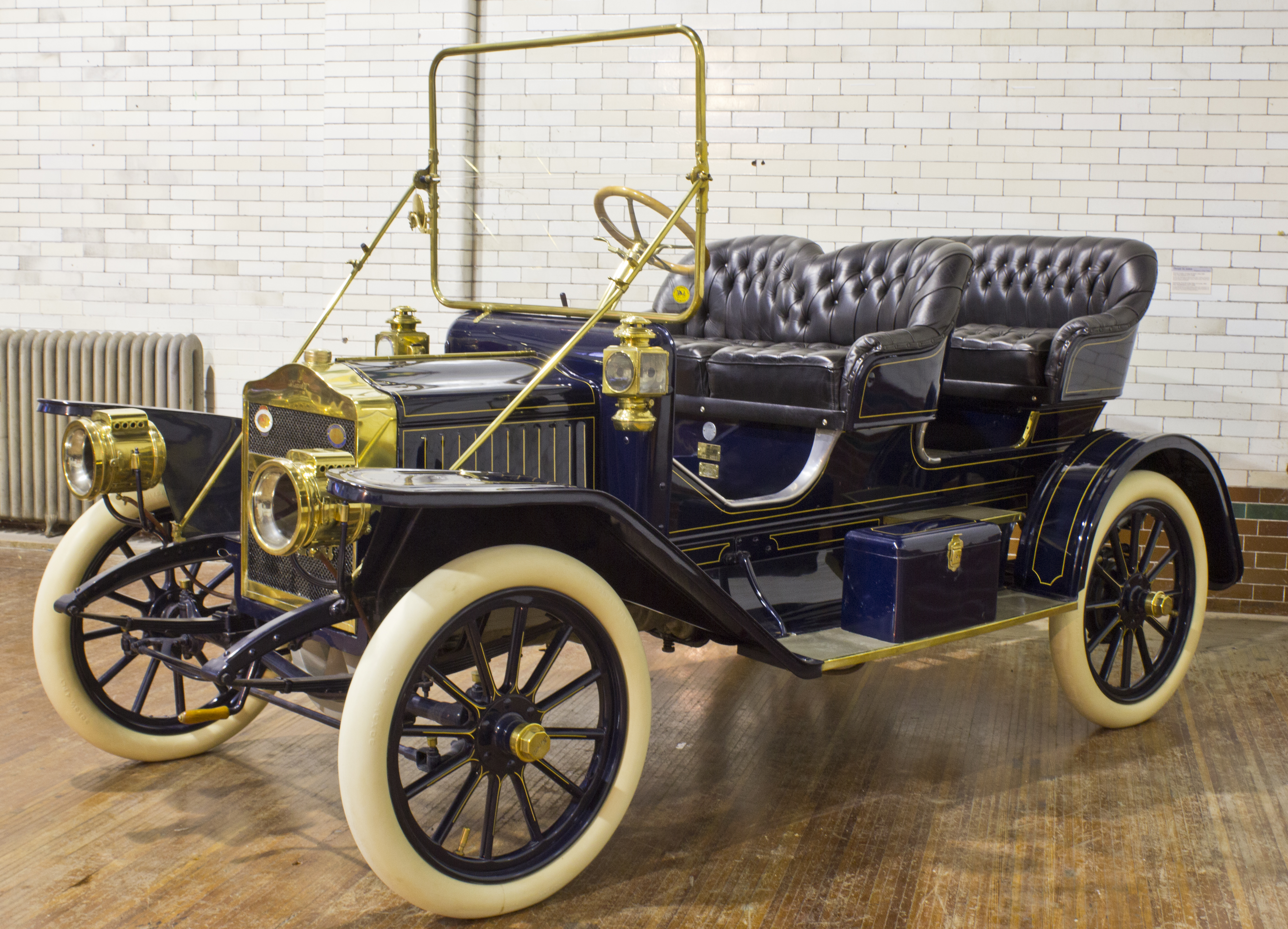
1910 Maxwell Model Q Standard

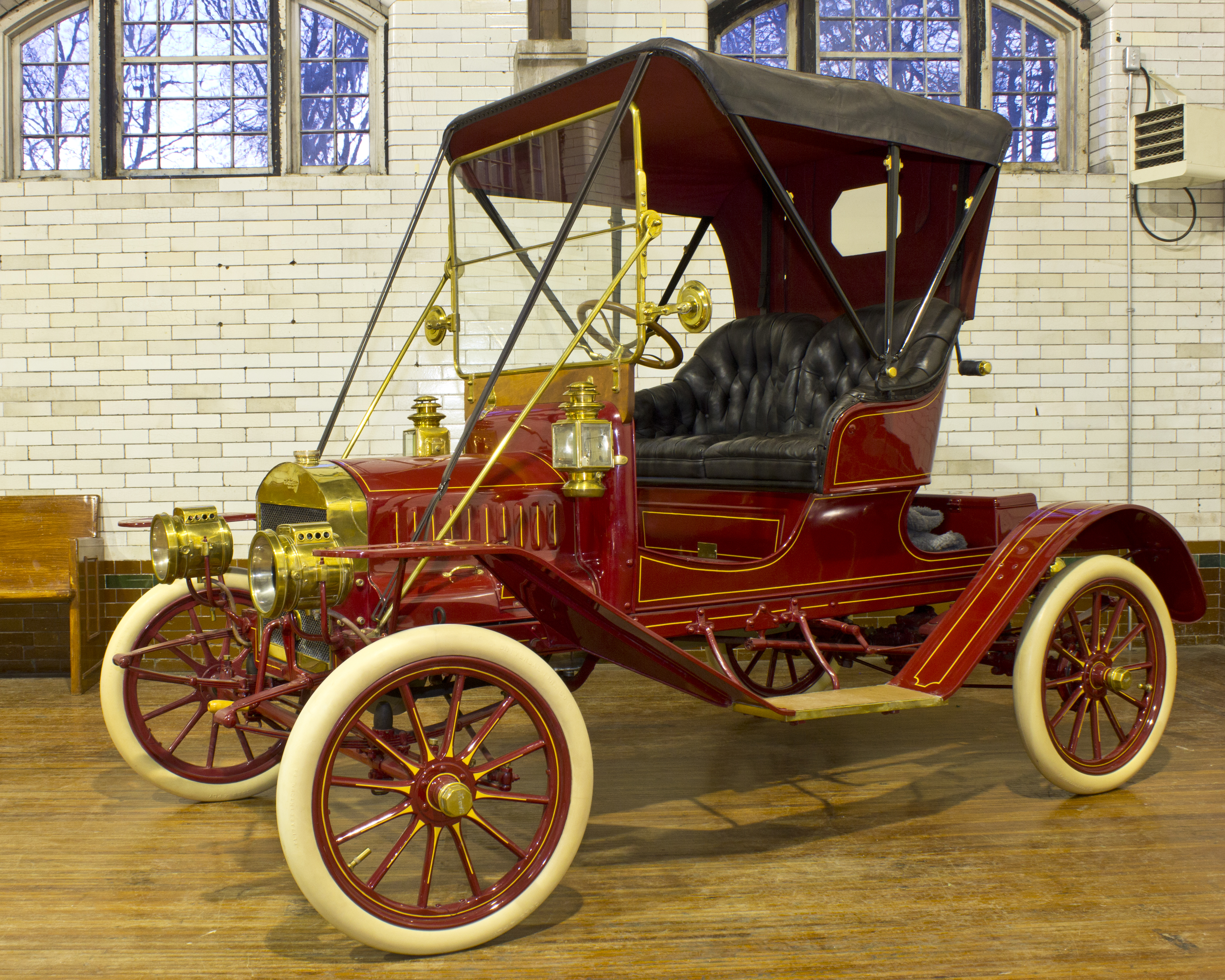
1910 Maxwell Model Q Standard

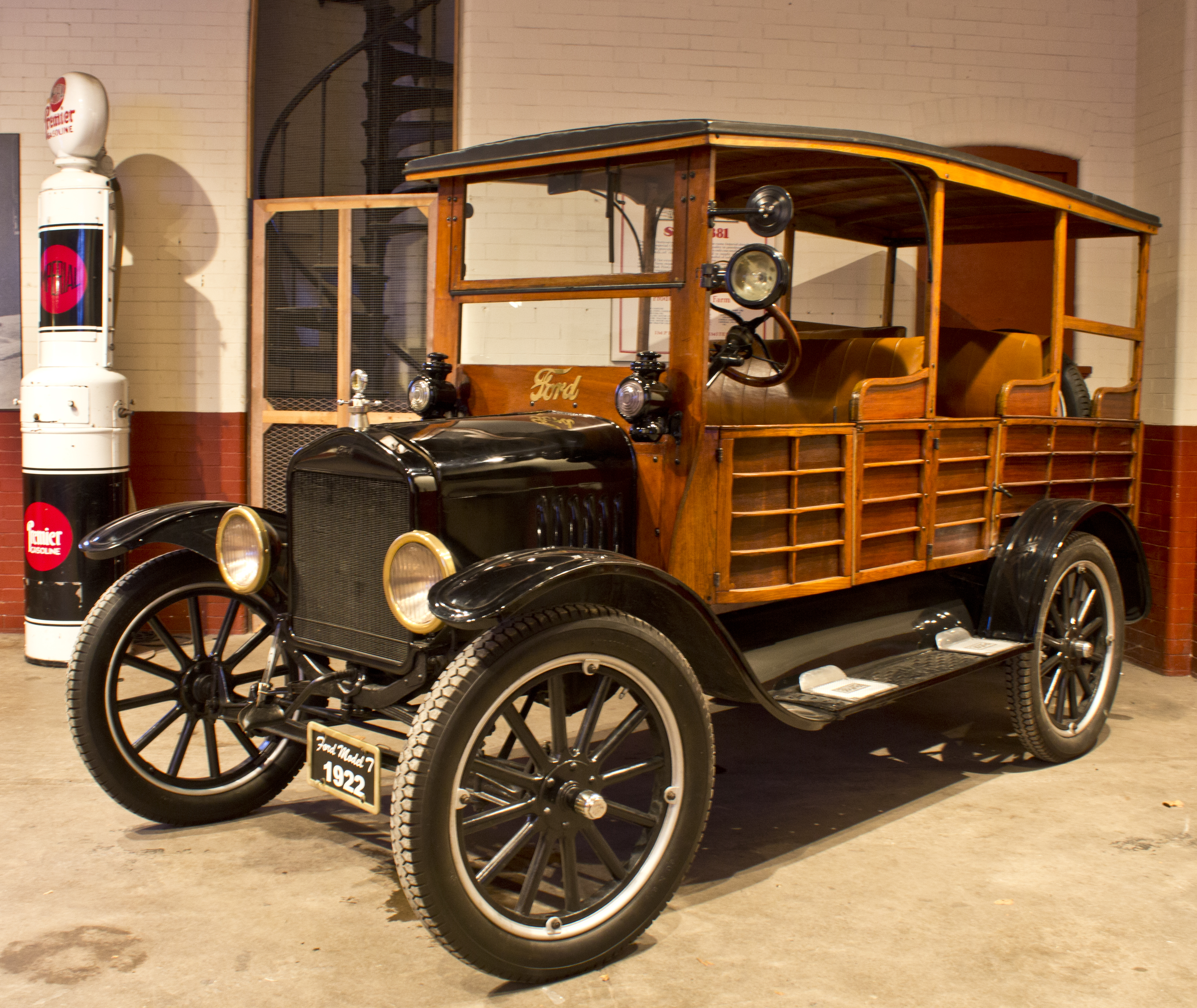
1922 Ford Model T Woody

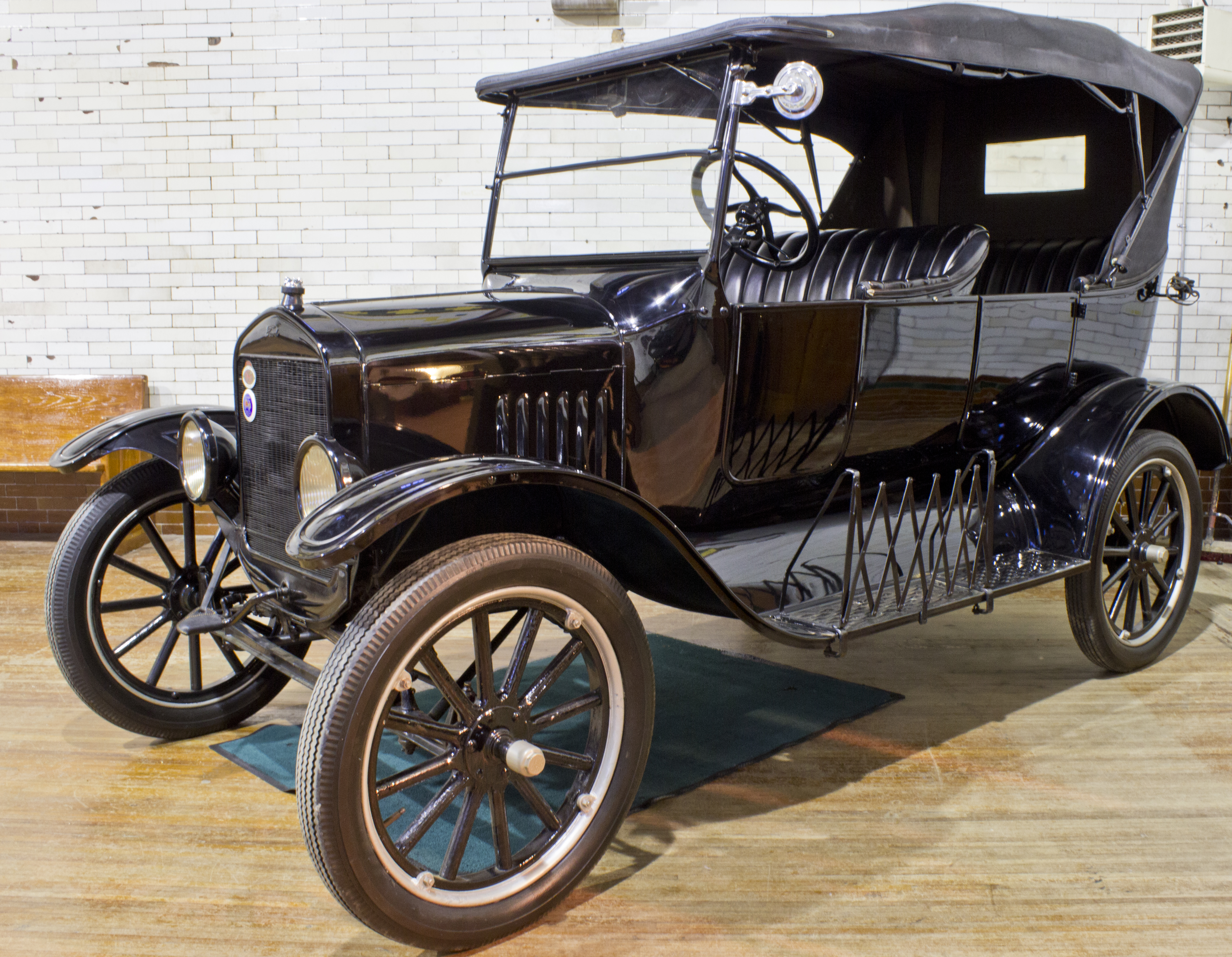
1924-1925 Ford Model T Touring

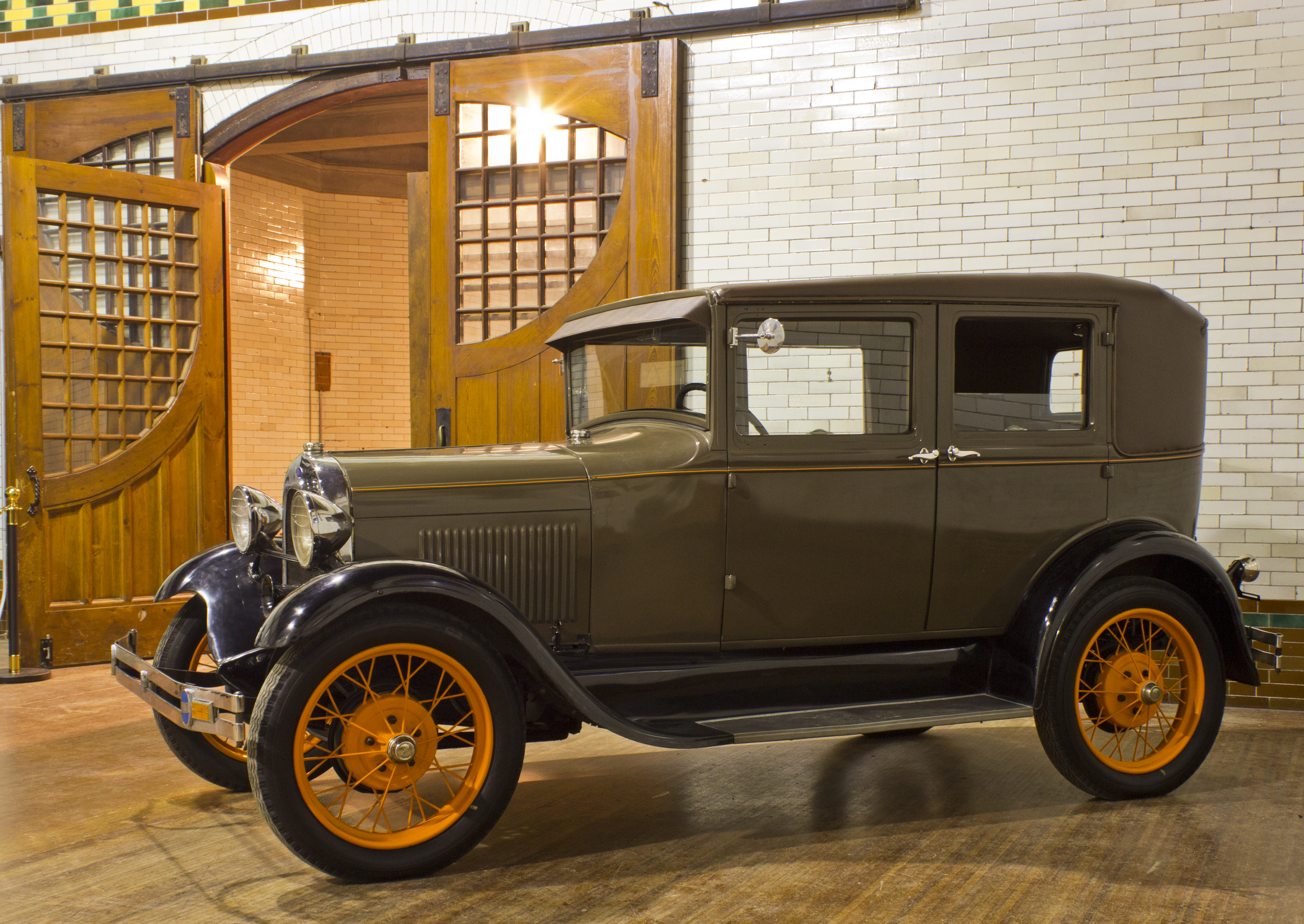
1929 Ford Model A

== Location ==
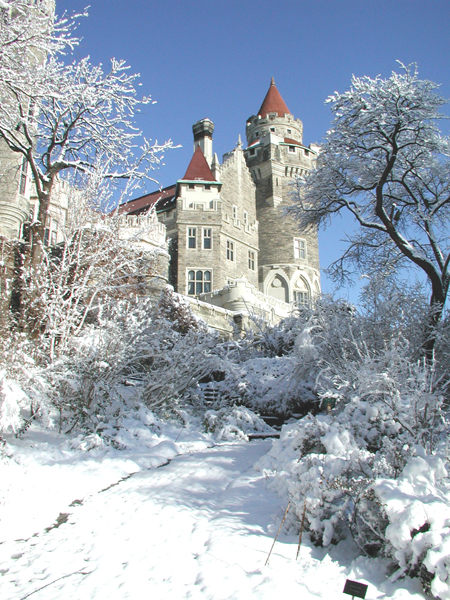
The property is located on an escarpment above Davenport Road.

Casa Loma is located on Austin Terrace at Spadina Road, on an escarpment (Davenport Hill) above Davenport Road. Davenport runs along the bottom of the escarpment, which was the shoreline of Lake Iroquois, the predecessor of Lake Ontario (coordinates 43.678°N 79.4093°W). Casa Loma affords views down the escarpment and Spadina Avenue into the heart of Toronto. The stables are located at 330 Walmer Road and the Hunting Lodge at 328 Walmer Road.

Casa Loma is served by St. Clair West Station and Dupont Station on the Yonge-University line of the Toronto subway.

== Film location ==
Casa Loma is a popular location for use in film and television. It has served as a location for movies such as Strange Brew, Chicago, The Tuxedo, Scott Pilgrim vs. the World, Warehouse 13, Crimson Peak, Twitches, Twitches Too, and The Pacifier. It has portrayed the X-Mansion in X-Men, and Wayne Manor in Titans.

Comic books and children's novels that have used it include the Scott Pilgrim series and Eric Wilson's murder mystery The Lost Treasure of Casa Loma. In the CBC Television show Being Erica, the episode "Mi Casa, Su Casa Loma" features Casa Loma prominently as the place where main character Erica Strange works.

It also appeared in the television adaptation of R. L. Stine's Goosebumps series' A Night In Terror Tower. Casa Loma also features prominently in the biography-documentary of Sir Henry Pellatt, The Pellatt Newsreel: the Man who Built Casa Loma, which was nominated for a 2009 Gemini for Best Biography Documentary. TV show Hemlock Grove was also filmed there as well as The Mortal Instruments: City of Bones and related Shadowhunters.

Exterior shots of the building were used in the Gothic TV show Strange Paradise.

It is also the filming location of the 2016 TV film The Rocky Horror Picture Show: Let's Do the Time Warp Again, where scenes at Dr. Frank N. Furter's castle and the movie theatre where the audience participated were filmed. Ivy Levan's performance of the song "Science Fiction Double Feature" was filmed at Casa Loma (a movie theatre marquee was placed at the front entrance of the castle for filming).

In 2018, Casa Loma served as a filming location for the 2019 American black comedy thriller Ready or Not.

In 2022, Casa Loma was the filming location of the music video for Wait for U by Future and Drake.

In 2025, Top Chef: Destination Canada filmed the Episode 4 Elimination challenge at Casa Loma.

In 2026, Casa Loma was one of the filming locations for the Team Challenge of the eleventh episode of MasterChef: Global Gauntlet.

== See also ==
- Mary Lake Augustinian Monastery
- List of museums in Toronto
