= Mary Malcolmson =

Canadian scouting pioneer

- Born: 1864; Ireland
- Died: 7 July 1935 (aged 70–71); St. Catharines, Canada
- Known for: Starting the first Girl Guide company in Canada

Mary Helen McKean Malcolmson was the founder of the first Girl Guide company in Canada, which she started on 1910-01-11 in St. Catharines, Ontario.

She was born in Ireland in 1864, and she later emigrated to Canada where she married A.H. Malcolmson. She became highly involved in community endeavors and was instrumental in founding the St. Catharines branch of the Women's Canadian Club, the Victorian Order of Nurses and the St. Catharines Council of Women. She was also a well-known officer of the I.O.D.E. (Imperial Order Daughters of the Empire) and convener in the National Council of Women of Canada. She died 7 July 1935.

== 1st St. Catharines ==
Malcolmson organized the first Canadian Girl Guide company to be officially registered. The Company started to meet in November 1909 in St. Catharines, Ontario and was registered on 1910-01-11. Meetings were held in the Welland House Hotel. Pamphlet A: Baden-Powell Girl Guides, a Suggestion for Character Training for Girls and Pamphlet B: Baden-Powell Girl Guides, a Suggestion for Character Training for Girls had been sent to a Scout leader in St. Catharines and he passed them on to Malcolmson.

== St. Catharines Council of Women ==
St. Catharines Council of Women was founded in 1918. Malcolmson was elected as its first president. The goals of the St. Catharines Council of Women were to improve the conditions of families, community, and the Canadian state.

== Malcolmson Park ==
A park in St. Catharines was named for Malcolmson. It is bounded to the east by the Welland Canal, to the west by Port Weller, to the north by Lake Ontario and to the south, by Lakeshore Road.

== See also ==
- Girl Guides of Canada
- Mary Pellatt
