= Marylake Augustinian Monastery =

Monastery in King City, Ontario, Canada

Coordinates: 43°57′2.47″N 79°32′36.62″W

The Marylake Augustinian Monastery, also known as Marylake Monastery, Marylake Shrine, or simply Marylake, is an Augustinian monastery in King City, Ontario, Canada. The campus is nearly 1,000 acres (4.0 km^{2}), residing on Keele Street, just north of 15th Sideroad (Bloomington). It is part of the Province of Saint Joseph, the Canadian province of Augustinians which operates under the jurisdiction of the Chicago-based Province of Our Mother of Good Counsel.

Marylake is the chief foundation of the Augustinians in Canada, and is now well known as a spiritual centre for the Catholic Archdiocese of Toronto. Marylake generally refers to the complex which includes the property, the monastery and shrine, and which operates a retreat centre. The shrine is named the Our Lady of Grace Shrine, whose title is taken from an Augustinian shrine in Lisbon, Portugal. The monastery motto is One mind and one heart unto God.

In 1999, the mendicant order established a school on the property, St. Thomas of Villanova College. It uses the house system, with houses such as St. Augustine, St. Nicholas, St. Rita, and St. Monica.

== History ==
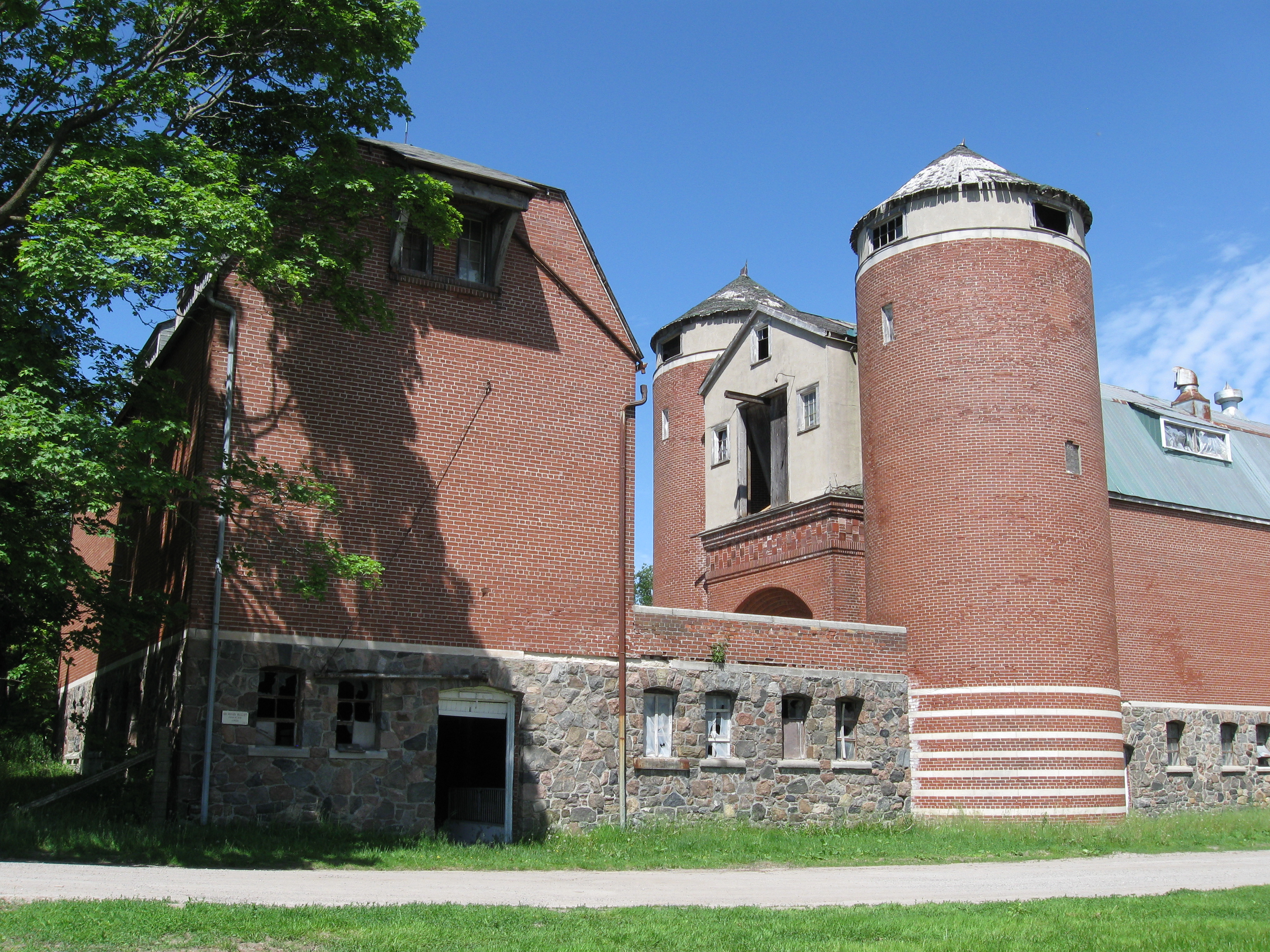
Sir Henry Pellatt's barn at Marylake.

Originally, the property was the farm and summer home of Sir Henry Pellatt, and it was named for his first wife, Mary. It has been owned by the Augustinians since 1935.

An agricultural school was established on the grounds in the 1930s by the Basilian fathers, and in 1942 the Archbishop of Toronto, Cardinal McGuigan, "invited the Augustinians to establish a shrine and to offer a program of weekend retreats for lay people" He expressed that it was his own personal dream that it was his hope that this shrine at the Marylake Centre would become not only an important place of pilgrimage in honour of our Blessed Mother Mary in this area, but that one day it would officially become the centre of Marian devotion for all Ontario. The success of this program resulted in the construction of the shrine in the 1960s, which was dedicated on November 30, 1978 by Cardinal Carter.

The building consists of split fieldstone native to Marylake, based on designs by J. Stuart Cauley.

Marylake held its first mass in 1945. It is the site for a yearly June pilgrimage by 3,000 Danube Swabians for an open-air mass paying "homage to Germans expelled from Eastern Europe".

In October 2012, the Archbishop of Toronto, Cardinal Thomas Christopher Collins, declared Marylake as one of four official archdiocesan sites of sacred pilgrimage for the Year of Faith. On February 3, 2013, in a Solemn High Mass, the Very Reverend Bernard Scianna, O.S.A., Ph.D., Prior Provincial of the Canadian and Midwest Augustinians, officially blessed and designated the main entrance to the shrine as a holy door open to all who come to Marylake seeking the special graces of the Year of Faith.

The Rosary Path at Marylake The Queen of the Holy Rosary Shrine (Lay Apostolate) gained approval from the Augustinian Friars to place an environmental sculpture of the Rosary at Marylake In 2014, ground was broken to build the largest rosary path in North America. In August 2016, Cardinal Collins blessed and Opened the rosary path. The Corpus of The Great Crucifix which is at the beginning of the rosary path was created by the world-renowned sculptor Timothy Schmaltz. In 2016, Mary's Way of the Cross was added to the pathway, and in 2017, large (7' X 4') glass panels created by Stuart Reid were added to the Way of the Cross.

The rosary path at Marylake was conceived by architect Ted Harasti of Toronto. After receiving a Marian locution on a retreat in 1974, Harasti made it his quest to build the rosary path at the request of the Blessed Mother Mary.

== Pipe organ ==
The monastery has a pipe organ built from two 1928 Aeolian-Skinner Duo-Art organs, which were obtained in 1960 from the Eaton estate and Seagram estate. Work to combine the two organs began in 1968 and was completed in 1973; it was first played for midnight mass that year. It has the original leather work, now cracked and torn, and has over 3000 pipes. Marylake plans to repair the organ and transform it to digital operation at a cost of CA$100,000.

== Filming locations ==
- The 1960s TV series The Forest Rangers used Marylake as a filming location, as it was a good match for lake scenery from Ontario's north
- 1995 film Billy Madison

== See also ==
- Casa Loma
- Eaton Hall
- Spadina House

== Notes ==
- Burchill, Aemon. "History of Marylake". Marylake Monastery.
- Pavilons, Mark (11 June 2014). "Efforts to refurbish antique organ at Marylake". King Weekly Sentinel.
- Ruprecht, Tony (2010). Toronto's Many Faces (5th ed.). Dundurn Press. ISBN 9781459718050.
- Tantalo, S.G. (John). "The Augustinian Monastery".
- Oak Ridges Moraine. STORM Coalition. Boston Mills Press. 1997. ISBN 1550461915.
- Midwest Augustinians - Province of Our Mother of Good Counsel
