= 1896 Toronto municipal election =

Municipal elections were held in Toronto, Canada, on January 6, 1896. Former mayor Robert John Fleming was elected, defeating Alderman John Shaw. Fleming was considered a reformer while Shaw was considered the candidates of the Conservative establishment.

== Toronto mayor ==
Results
Robert John Fleming - 10,281
John Shaw - 8,583

== Board of Control ==
Legislation was passed in the Ontario legislature in early April 1896 creating a Board of Control was a reform measure to serve as a cabinet or executive committee for the city. On April 20, 1896, three Controllers were elected by Toronto City Council from among its members, and presided over by the mayor. Aldermen Graham, Lamb, and McMurrich were elected to sit on the body.

== Aldermen elected to City Council ==
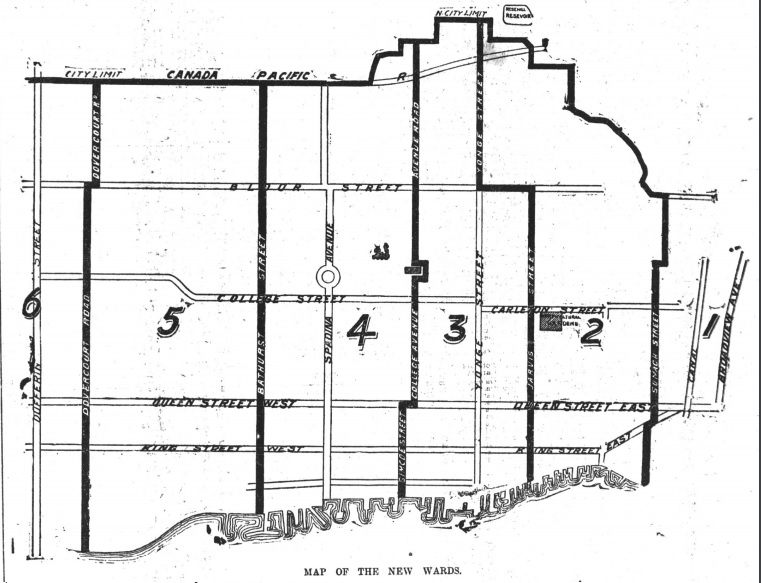
Map of Toronto's six wards (1892-1909), published in The Globe, 1 January 1892.

Four alderman were elected to sit on Toronto City Council in each of six wards. All 19 aldermen seeking re-election were successful.

First Ward
John Knox Leslie (incumbent) - 1,075
C.C. Small - 1,058
Ernest A. Macdonald - 1,035 (subsequently disqualified)
Thomas Allen (incumbent) - 1,031
J.A. Purvis - 861
W.T. Stewart -640
Elgin Schoff - 426

Macdonald was unseated by the court in March 1896 as a result of a finding that he was not a qualified candidate at the time of his election as he did not own property that qualified him to hold office in the First Ward, as required by the Municipal Act. A new election was ordered and John Russell was elected to fill the vacant sat.

Second Ward
Francis S. Spence - 1,562
John Hallam (incumbent) - 1,518
Thomas Davies (incumbent) - 1,511
Daniel Lamb (incumbent) - 1,320
Dr. Samuel Thompson - 1,150
Thomas Foster - 1,008
William L. Beale - 1,027
Isaac G. Johnson - 595
John Murphy - 39

Third Ward
Bernard Saunders (incumbent) - 2,381
O.B. Sheppard (incumbent) - 2,379
George McMurrich (incumbent) - 2,363
James B. Boustead- 1,994
Wallace Millichamp - 1,652
J. Enoch Thompson - 1,146

Fourth Ward
William Burns (incumbent) - 2,356
Wm. P. Hubbard (incumbent) - 2,058
James Crane (incumbent) - 1,835
James Jolliffe (incumbent) -1,448
John McCaffrey - 1,093
John Lester - 583
Robert P. Hall - 485
Frank Sexton -283

Fifth Ward
William Bell (incumbent) - 1,508
W.T.R. Preston - 1,441
Robert H. Graham (incumbent) - 1,388
John Dunn (incumbent) - 1,194
Arthur R. Denison - 998
Francis H. Woods - 987
Dr. William Stewart Fraleigh - 809

Sixth Ward
James Gowanlock (incumbent) - 1,075
James Scott (incumbent) - 965
G.G. Rowe - 954
John J. Graham (incumbent) - 933
Adam Lynd M.D. - 816
C.L. Denison - 781
Dr. John Hunter - 579
Thomas W. Todd - 360

Source: and
