= James Beaty Jr. =

Canadian politician

The Hon. James Beaty
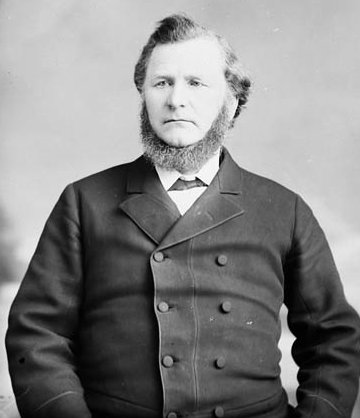

22nd Mayor of Toronto
- In office 1879–1880
- Preceded by: Angus Morrison
- Succeeded by: William Barclay McMurrich

Member of the Canadian Parliament for West Toronto
- In office August 28, 1880 – January 15, 1887
- Preceded by: John Beverley Robinson
- Succeeded by: Frederick Charles Denison

Personal details
- Born: November 10, 1831 Trafalgar, Upper Canada
- Died: March 15, 1899 (aged 67) Toronto, Ontario, Canada
- Party: Conservative

James Beaty QC (November 10, 1831 – March 15, 1899) was a mayor of Toronto from 1879 to 1880. He was then a Member of Canada's Parliament from 1880 to 1887. He was also a member of the Orange Order in Canada.

Beaty was born on Ashdale Farm, in Trafalgar Township of Halton County, Upper Canada. After schooling in Palermo, Province of Canada, he studied law in Toronto, formally becoming a lawyer in 1855. He was designated Queen's Counsel in 1872.

His father was John Beaty, an Irish emigrant. On 10 November 1858, he married a cousin, Fanny Beaty (d. 18 January 1898).

One of his uncles, a previous Canadian Member of Parliament, was also named James Beaty and therefore was referred to in some instances as "James Beaty, Sen." (senior). Conversely, the younger Beaty is sometimes referred to as "James Beaty, Jr.".

Following his terms as Toronto Mayor in 1879 and 1880, he won election to the House of Commons of Canada on 28 August 1880. He became a Conservative party member who represented the West Toronto riding. He was re-elected on 20 June 1882 to serve in the 5th Canadian Parliament.

Beaty was a prohibitionist during his time in parliament. The Globe newspaper derided him as a "boodler" and "the notorious 'Boy'", and argued that his support for prohibition was based on a hypocritical calculation for personal advantage.

He lost the West Toronto Conservative nomination to Frederick Charles Denison in the buildup to the 1887 federal election, and returned to legal practice.

He made an unsuccessful bid to return as Toronto's Mayor in the 1892 Toronto municipal election.

Beaty served as a bencher of the Law Society of Upper Canada from 1881 to 1891.

In 1899, James Beaty sustained an apparent stroke from which he would not recover. He died at the Toronto home of his son-in-law, A.J.R. Snow, husband of his only surviving child.

== Sources ==
- "Death of Ex-Mayor Beaty". The Globe. 16 March 1899. p. 4.
- Access Genealogy: James Beaty (1831-1899)
