= 1892 Toronto municipal election =

Municipal elections were held in Toronto, Canada, on January 4, 1892. Robert John Fleming, was elected to his first term in office, defeating financier and Board of Trade president Edmund Boyd Osler, John McMillan, and former mayor and Member of Parliament James Beaty.

== Toronto mayor ==
Results
Robert John Fleming - 8,581
Edmund Boyd Osler - 8,204
John McMillan - 4,652
James Beaty - 597

== Plebiscites ==
Two plebiscites were conducted; one to soften Toronto's blue laws by allowing streetcars to operate on Sundays and a second on having school books provided to students for free.

Sunday streetcars
Yea - 9,950
Nay - 13,997

Free school books
Yea - 11,346
Nay - 7,907

== Aldermen elected to City Council ==
Wards were redrawn and consolidated for this election meaning some wards had more incumbents running than there were seats. Instead of 13 wards electing three alderman each, there were now six wards, each electing four alderman to sit on Toronto City Council.

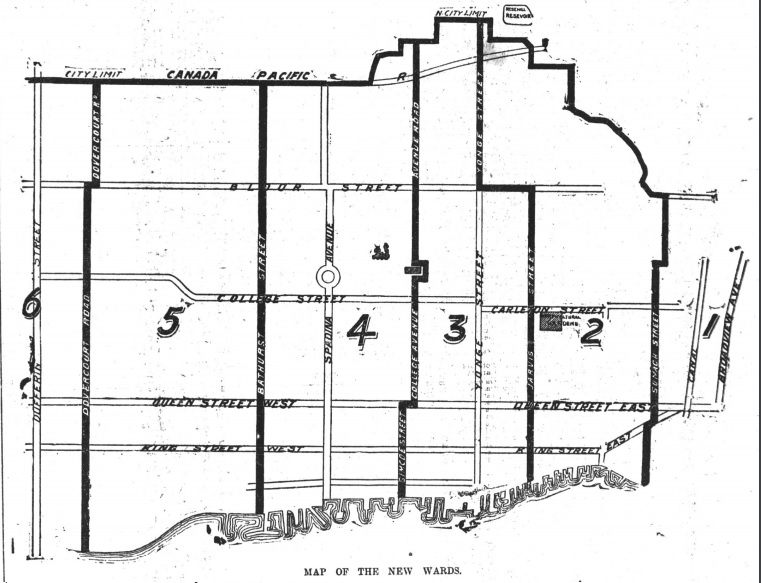
Map of Toronto's newly redrawn wards, published in The Globe, 1 January 1892.

First Ward
Charles C. Small (incumbent) - 1,311
John Knox Leslie (incumbent) - 1,272
George S. Macdonald - 944
W.T. Stewart - 896
Peter Macdonald (incumbent) - 881
T. Allen (incumbent) - 857
J. Pape (incumbent) - 763

Second Ward
John Hallam (incumbent) - 2,163
Daniel Lamb - 2,149
Thomas Foster - 1,530
David Carlyle - 1,519
Edward Hewitt (incumbent) - 1,398
P. O'Connor - 1,071
K. Farquahar (incumbent) - 947
W.W. Park - 946

Third Ward
Bernard Saunders (incumbent) - 2,940
George McMurrich (incumbent) - 2,195
Richard John Score (incumbent) - 2,136
John Shaw (incumbent) - 2,010
John Flett (incumbent) - 1,961
W.J. Hill (incumbent) - 1,944
G.M. Rose (incumbent) - 1,924
William N. Hall - 930
Ernest A. Macdonald - 523

Fourth Ward
William Carlyle - 2,795
William Burns (incumbent) - 2,451
James Jolliffe (incumbent) - 2,225
George Verral (incumbent) - 2,090
Frederick Phillips (incumbent) - 1,912
John Lucas - 1,521

Fifth Ward
William Bell (incumbent) - 2,339
Thomas Crawford - 1,870
R.H. Graham (incumbent) - 1,843
John Bailey (incumbent) - 1,635
J.E. Verral (incumbent) - 1,363
T.K Rogers - 906
Peter Whittock - 484
John Mulvey - 238
Charles T. Pearce - 160

Sixth Ward
James Gowanlock (incumbent) - 1,215
W.F. Atkinson (incumbent) - 1,201
Dr. J. O. Orr (incumbent) - 1,143
John Maloney (incumbent) - 1,096
William Crealock (incumbent) - 1,033
Hugh MacMath (incumbent) - 986
Thomas Murray - 799
George B. Boyle - 235

Source: and
