= Forest Lawn Mausoleum & Cremation Centre =

Mausoleum and cremation centre in Toronto, Canada

Coordinates: 43°45′21″N 79°24′36″W

Forest Lawn Mausoleum & Cremation Centre is a mausoleum and crematorium at 4570 Yonge Street in the North York district of Toronto, Ontario. It is operated by Park Lawn Limited Partnership, an affiliate of Park Lawn Corporation.

== History ==
Forest Lawn Mausoleum was established in the early 1910s on a 3.5-acre (1.4 ha) site in what was then the village of Lansing. The mausoleum was an early example of a public mausoleum in Toronto. Its interior features Italian marble and stained-glass windows.

Henry Pellatt was among the investors in Forest Lawn Mausoleum in 1913 and served as one of the company's early directors. He was later entombed there, as were members of the family of chocolate manufacturer William Neilson.

In 2009, the Ontario Historical Society reported that burials from the former York Mills Presbyterian cemetery were believed to have been moved to Forest Lawn Mausoleum and York Cemetery around 1927.

A crematorium was built on the site in 1980. Forest Lawn later became part of Park Lawn's operations following its 2002 acquisition of Westside Cemeteries Limited. The Commonwealth War Graves Commission records five identified First and Second World War casualties at the mausoleum.
