= Warring Kennedy =

Canadian businessman and politician

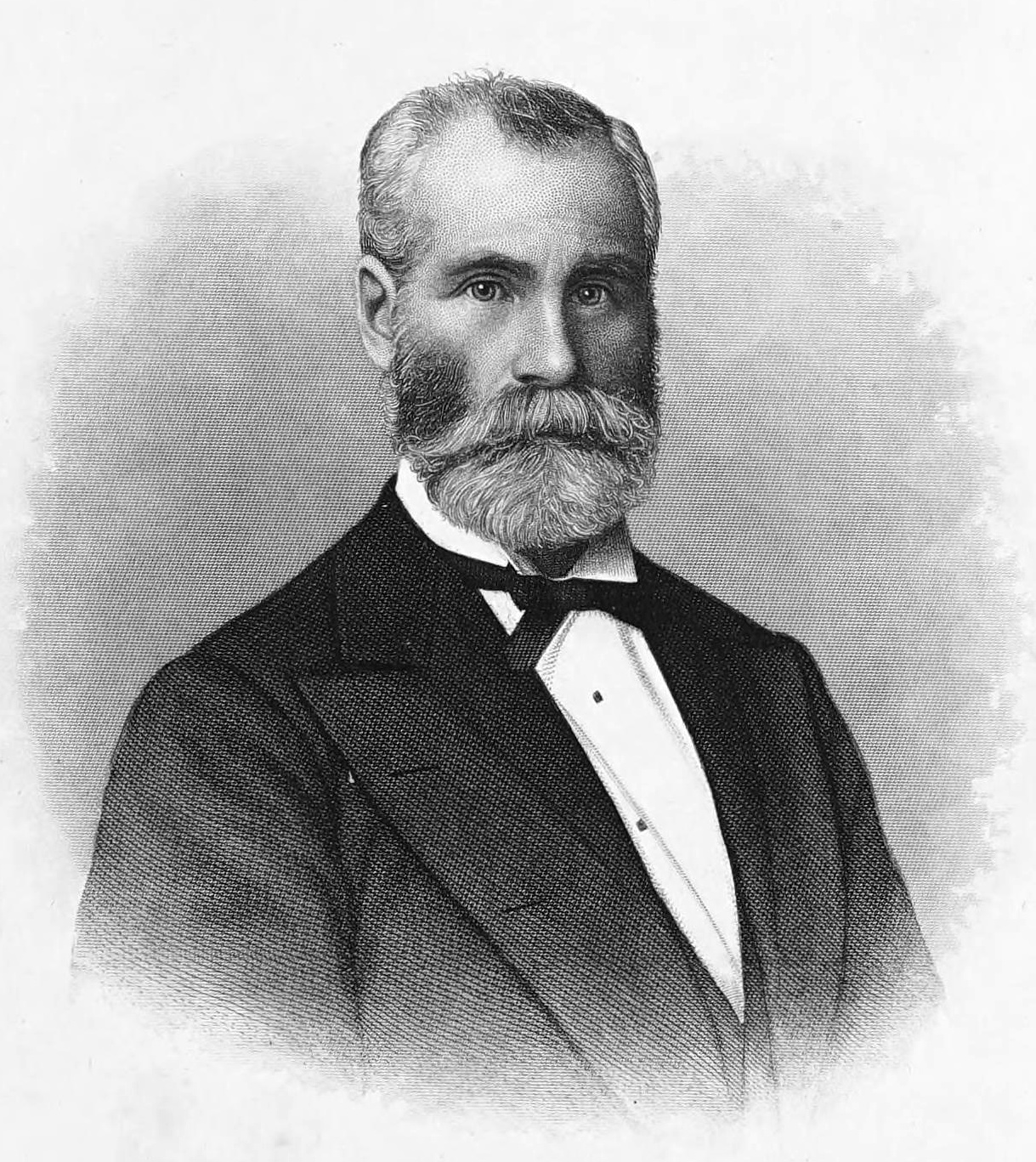
- Kennedy in an 1880 engraving

28th Mayor of Toronto
- In office 1894–1895
- Preceded by: Robert John Fleming
- Succeeded by: Robert John Fleming

Toronto St. John's Ward Alderman
- In office 1871-1877

Personal details
- Born: 12 November 1827 County Down, Ireland
- Died: 25 June 1904 (aged 76) Toronto, Ontario
- Resting place: Plot J, Lot 16, Mount Pleasant Cemetery

Warring Kennedy (12 November 1827 – 25 June 1904) was a Canadian politician and businessman who served as Mayor of Toronto from 1894 to 1895. He was born and educated in Ireland and immigrated to Toronto in 1857. He opened a dried goods company and participated in political organisastions and Methodist conferences. He was elected as alderman in the Toronto City Council, representing St. John's Ward, in 1871. He was unsuccessful in his first run for mayor in 1877, but was successful in his second attempt in 1894 and his reelection the following year. Kennedy's terms as mayor were negatively affected by an economic downturn in Toronto and allegations of corruption within the Toronto administration, including a report that accused Kennedy of improper acts. His company went bankrupt in 1895 and Kennedy left municipal office. He worked as an insurance agent and sat on the boards of various philanthropic organisations. He died in Toronto and is buried at Mount Pleasant Cemetery.

== Early life and business career ==
He was born in County Down, Ireland, on 12 November 1827, he attended a grammar school in Derry and apprenticed at a dried food business in Kilrea. He later moved to Belfast before immigrating to Toronto in 1857. He worked first for the firm of Robert Walker, known as The Golden Lion, and then for John Macdonald & Company.

In 1869, Kennedy and two others opened a wholesale dry goods firm called Sampson, Kennedy and Gemmel. It was later renamed Sampson, Kennedy & Company after the death of Gemmel. The business was located in a warehouse at Scott and Colborne Streets in Toronto and they sold fabric and sewing goods. Kennedy was the general manager of the warehouse and managed purchases. He was also involved in several political organisations including the Toronto Board of Trade, the Yorkville and Toronto Christian Temperance Mission, and the Upper Canada Bible Society. He was also secretary of the Toronto Conference of Methodists and a delegate at the 1890 Methodist ecumenical council.

== Political career ==
Kennedy was elected to Toronto City Council as alderman for St. John's Ward in 1871. In 1877, he ran for mayor but was defeated by Angus Morrison by nearly 1,000 votes. He ran again in the 1894 Toronto municipal election for mayor against the incumbent Robert John Fleming. Kennedy's style of campaigning was subdued and low-key, while Fleming was unpopular after his administration was blamed for the economic hardships Toronto was experiencing. Kennedy received the support of his fellow Methodists and the Women's Christian Temperance Union, two groups that had previously supported Fleming. Kennedy defeated Fleming by almost 4000 votes. In his first term, rumours circulated that alderman were bribed into changing their vote for awarding a street light contract. Kennedy launched a public inquiry to investigate corruption within the municipal government. Kennedy was reelected the following year, defeating Fleming in an electoral rematch by 14 votes.

Kennedy's second mayoral term was affected by a civic investigation that presented numerous reports on corruption within the administration of Toronto, including allegations that Kennedy engaged in improper conduct. This caused the public to advocate for reforms. In September, the economic downturn caused his business to enter receivership and its shares were bought by the T. Eaton Company.

== Post-political career and death ==
Kennedy left public life and from 1887 to 1889 he was an insurance agent for the Mutual Reserve Fund Life Assurance. He was also the Secretary-General of the Toronto Orthopedic Hospital. He served as the first president of the Commercial Travelers' Association and sat on various boards for social causes including the House of Industry, the Hospital for Incurables and the Irish Protestant Association, and the Toronto General Burying Ground Trust. He died early in the morning on 25 June 1904 at his sister's home in Toronto and buried in Mount Pleasant Cemetery.
