= Toronto Electric Light Company =

The Toronto Electric Light Company was an early electricity supplier in Toronto, founded and presided over by John Joseph Wright (1847–1922) and owned by Sir Henry Pellatt.

Founded in 1882, TELC opened a steam driven power plant at Scott Street and The Esplanade. The plant was used to win a contract to provide night time street lighting (50 lights), replacing the oil and kerosene lamps in the old city of Toronto on King, Queen and Yonge Streets. By 1884 it was "used by a number of prominent establishments" as well. This power plant lasted into the 1920s when it was replaced by Central Heating Plant.

TELC was eventually linked to Toronto Power Company and in 1906 TELC Toronto Power Generating Station was opened at Niagara Falls, Ontario to harness hydro electric power for Toronto.

The company was acquired by the Hydro-Electric Power Commission of Ontario in 1922, after private utilities ended in the early 1900s under the order of Sir Adam Beck.
