= Girl Guides of Canada =

National Guiding association

- Vision: A better world, by girls. Mission: To be a catalyst for girls empowering girls.
- French: Guides du Canada
- Headquarters: Toronto, Ontario
- Country: Canada
- Founded: September 7, 1910
- Membership: Girls: 76,449; Adults: 20,700; (as of 2018)
- Chair, Board of Directors: Pam Laycock
- Affiliation: World Association of Girl Guides and Girl Scouts
- Website www.girlguides.ca

Girl Guides of Canada (GGC; French: Guides du Canada) is the national Guiding association of Canada. Guiding in Canada started on September 7, 1910, and GGC was among the founding members of the World Association of Girl Guides and Girl Scouts (WAGGGS) in 1928.

== History ==
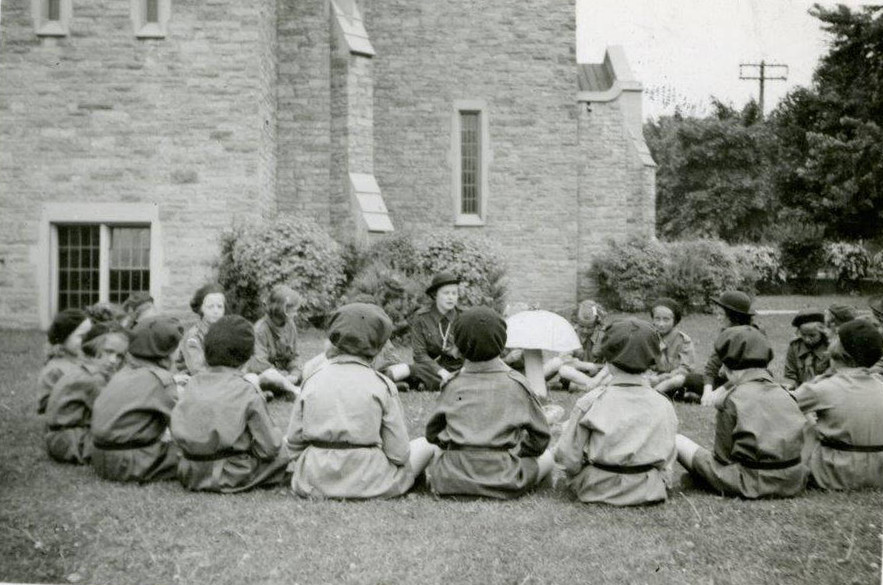
An outdoor storytelling session for the 72nd Toronto Pack, 1938

Mary Malcolmson organized the first Canadian Girl Guides Company to be officially registered in St. Catharines, Ontario; their registration is dated 1910-01-11. A park in St. Catharines was later named for Mary Malcolmson. Other Guide Companies were registered later in 1910 in Toronto, Moose Jaw and Winnipeg. The First Toronto Company held the first-recorded Girl Guide Camp in Canada on the banks of the Credit River in June 1911. By 1912, the movement had spread to all parts of Canada, and had become so popular that on 24 July 1912 Agnes Baden-Powell created Mary, Lady Pellatt "Chief Commissioner of the Dominion of Canada Girl Guides". Many Guide events were held at Lady Pellatt's home, Casa Loma, in Toronto. It is now a tourist attraction with a special Girl Guide display.

The first Canadian companies were constituted as part of the British Girl Guides Association. In 1917, the Parliament of Canada incorporated the organization under the name of "The Canadian Council of the Girl Guides Association". This Act has only been amended twice: first in 1947 to allow for the further acquisition of property, and later in 1961 to change the name to "Girl Guides of Canada" (French: Guides du Canada).

In 1918 Newfoundland's first Guide Company was formed, even though the Province did not become part of Canada until 1949.

The Salvation Army adopted Guiding as part of its program for girls in 1937 when it became officially associated with the organization. Although the Army disassociated itself from the program in 1998, it continues to offer a form of Guiding to its girls.

A recent initiative Girl Guides of Canada has undertaken is called “Thought Leadership” in which they conduct research on the challenges and issues facing girls, and use this information to develop relevant programming. Their most recent report Sexism, Feminism & Equality: What Teens in Canada Really Think, released in October 2018, highlights how young people feel about gender inequality and how this inequality impacts their lives.

=== Guides franco-canadiennes ===
In 1962 "Les Guides Catholiques du Canada (secteur français)" became a member of Girl Guides of Canada. This organization had originally been active only in the Province of Quebec but over the years had developed a small membership in other provinces. It had its own program, uniform and administration but acknowledged the Chief Commissioner of Canada as the head of Guiding in Canada and had membership in the World Association of Girl Guides and Girl Scouts. In 1992 "Les Guides Catholiques du Canada (secteur français)" became a separate, unaffiliated organization known as "Guides francophones du Canada". In 1995, they became officially affiliated with Girl Guides of Canada-Guides du Canada again, as "Les Guides franco-canadiennes". This affiliation ended in 2006.

== Program ==
Girl Guides of Canada is the largest organization for women and girls in Canada. The membership is organized into different branches according to age. These are: Sparks (ages 5 and 6), Embers (formerly known as Brownies prior to 2023) (ages 7 and 8), Guides (ages 9–11), Pathfinders (ages 12–14), and Rangers (15–17+).

The new program called Girls First was just launched in 2018 and is meant to be a catalyst for empowering girls.

There is also a program for girls who for whatever reason are not able to physically attend meetings. They are known as Lones and complete the program of their branch by correspondence with a Lone Guider.

Two of Guiding's newest initiatives are Extra Ops and Trex. These programs are for members who have more specific interests (i.e.: camping, hiking), Trex and Extra Ops programs are generally adopted by girls who are already a member of a branch of Guiding.

Adult members over the provincial age of majority are welcome in the organization as Leaders or Guiders. There are also places for volunteers in public relations, office jobs, and other important facets of the organization. A program for women ages 18–30 called Link is in place for those who wish to retain or establish their ties with Guiding, but who may not be able to give their time to the extent of being a Guider. However, Link members sometimes are Guiders or hold other positions within the organization as well. Link members choose to meet when convenient to do so, and often participate in Guiding events.

Adult members over the age of 30 have the option of joining the Trefoil Guild, which may or may not be in addition to other roles within the organization. Trefoil Guild groups usually meet once or twice a month, and often participate in Guiding events. Many Trefoil Guild members are senior citizens, some of whom have decades of Guiding experience.

=== Branches ===
==== Sparks ====
The Sparks program is for five and six-year-old girls. Like the other branches, they follow the Girls First program, which contains 8 program areas: Guide Together, Into the Outdoors, Build Skills, Explore Identities, Experiment and Create, Be Well, Connect and Question, and Take Action. Sparks participate in a wide variety of activities at weekly unit meetings. The Sparks uniform was originally a pink t-shirt with the Sparks promise: "I promise to share and be a friend" printed on it, but this has been updated to the same navy-blue t-shirts that all members of Girl Guides of Canada wear. The uniform also consists of an optional white tie with pink maple leaves and an optional navy-blue badge sash.

Sparks is the newest branch of Girl Guides, founded in 1988 and receiving the name 'Sparks' in 1989, in reference to Celtic fairy spirits associated with natural areas like forests.

==== Embers ====
Embers (previously known as Brownies) are seven and eight-year-old girls. Embers aim to develop a sense of identity and a positive relationship with others by participating in a variety of activities. Their uniforms were formerly brown, then orange and navy-blue, then the uniform blue t-shirt with brown insets at the collar and sleeves, and now the same navy-blue t-shirt as the other branches. There is an optional white tie with brown maple leaves and an optional navy-blue badge sash. Like the other branches, they follow the Girls First program, which contains 8 program areas: Guide Together, Into the Outdoors, Build Skills, Explore Identities, Experiment and Create, Be Well, Connect and Question, and Take Action. Embers can also work on optional discovery badges. The name Brownie was chosen as a reference to Celtic Fairy creatures that protect and do chores within a household or farm. In 2022, based on feedback from girls from racial minority backgrounds, the organization announced that the name would be replaced following a membership vote. In January 2023, GGC announced that the name "Embers" had won the vote. Local units were invited to adopt the new name immediately, with all web and print materials to be fully changed by September 2023.

==== Guides ====
Guides are girls between 9 and 11 years of age. Guides are encouraged to do service projects to help their communities. Guides learn about people in other countries and are encouraged to discover and explore issues which are important to them. Their uniforms -- originally navy blue, changed to sky blue and navy blue, then uniform blue shirts with navy blue insets and the collar and sleeves. They now wear the same navy-blue t-shirt as the other branches. There is an optional white tie with blue maple leaves and an optional navy-blue badge sash. Like the other branches, they follow the Girls First program, which contains 8 program areas - Guide Together, Into the Outdoors, Build Skills, Explore Identities, Experiment and Create, Be Well, Connect and Question, and Take Action. Each program area has three themes. Guides can also work on optional discovery badges. Girls can earn their Lady Baden Powell Award, the highest achievement a Guide can earn. Occasionally Guides help Sparks and Embers, earning a crests entitled "Spark/Brownie helper." Guides can go camping, canoe, have a sleepover, or help a local women's shelter.

==== Pathfinders ====
Pathfinders are girls between 12 and 14 years old. They focus on community service, leadership and camping. In Pathfinder units the girls are very independent and plan many camps, district camps, and meetings. Occasionally Pathfinders help Sparks and Embers, earning a crests entitled "Spark/Ember helper". The units are also usually very small, so the Pathfinders are usually close friends and very welcoming to new members. Their uniforms were green T-shirts, or white tee shirts, with the opposite coloured sleeves, then uniform blue with green inserts on the collar and sleeves. They now wear the same navy-blue t-shirt as the other branches. There is an optional white tie with green maple leaves and an optional navy-blue badge sash. Like the other branches, they follow the Girls First program, which contains 8 program areas - Guide Together, Into the Outdoors, Build Skills, Explore Identities, Experiment and Create, Be Well, Connect and Question, and Take Action. Each program area has three themes. Girls can earn their Citizenship Certificate, their Community Service Award, and their Canada Cord, which consists of badge work, first aid, planning and leading an event or camp, doing activities with other branches, and earning the Citizenship Certificate and Community Service Award. The Canada Cord requires a great commitment to guiding to be earned. Any girl registered in Girl Guides as a pathfinder is eligible to earn her Canada Cord award, regardless of how long she has been a member with Girl Guides of Canada.

==== Rangers ====
As of September 2008, girls between the ages of 15 and 17 (or older) are known as Rangers (prior to that date three branches of the GGC existed for youth in this age bracket: Rangers, Cadets and Junior Leaders, the latter two now defunct). They now wear the same navy-blue t-shirt as the other branches. There is an optional white tie with red maple leaves and an optional navy-blue badge sash. Like the other branches, they follow the Girls First program, which contains 8 program areas - Guide Together, Into the Outdoors, Build Skills, Explore Identities, Experiment and Create, Be Well, Connect and Question, and Take Action. Each program area has three themes. Rangers can earn their bronze, silver, or gold Trailblazer award. Rangers may also work on the Commonwealth Award or the Duke of Edinburgh Award. Adult leaders are there for guidance, but it is the Rangers who are responsible for planning and executing their activities.

==== Adults ====
Adult women can be a leader in a unit, or they can choose to be a member of Link or Trefoil Guild, depending on their age (Link 18-30 Trefoil must be 30+). Some members choose to participate in both functions.

== Principles ==
The Guiding movement is based on the principles outlined in the Promise and Law. Every Guide makes this promise when she is enrolled. The Promise and Law were renewed in 1994, and on 13 January 2010, the current Promise was unveiled.

=== Promise (current) ===
I promise to do my best,
To be true to myself, my beliefs, and Canada.
I will take action for a better world
And respect the Guiding Law.

==== Promise (1994–2010) ====
I promise to do my best,
To be true to myself, my God/faith and Canada;
I will help others,
And accept the Guiding Law.

- The word God or the word faith is chosen according to each girl's own personal convictions.
- The Brownie Promise finishes with "And respect the Brownie Law".

==== Promise Guides (pre-1994) ====
I promise, on my honour, to do my best:
To do my duty to God, the Queen, and my country,
To help other people everyday
And accept the Guiding Law.

Promise Brownies (pre-1994)
I promise to do my best:
To do my duty to God, the Queen, and my country.
To help other people everyday, especially those at home.

==== Spark Promise ====
I promise to share and be a friend.

=== Law (current) ===
The Guiding Law challenges me to:

- Be honest and trustworthy
- Use my resources wisely
- Respect myself and others
- Recognize and use my talents and abilities
- Protect our common environment
- Live with courage and strength
- Share in the sisterhood of Guiding.

==== Guide Law (pre-1994) ====
- A Guide's honour is to be trusted.
- A Guide is loyal.
- A Guide is useful and helps others.
- A Guide is a friend to all and a sister to every Guide.
- A Guide is courteous.
- A Guide is kind to animals and enjoys the beauty in nature.
- A Guide is obedient.
- A Guide smiles and sings even under difficulty.
- A Guide is thrifty.
- A Guide is pure in thought, word, and deed.

==== Brownie Law (pre-1994) ====
A Brownie is cheerful and obedient. A Brownie thinks of others before herself.

== Girl Guide Cookies ==
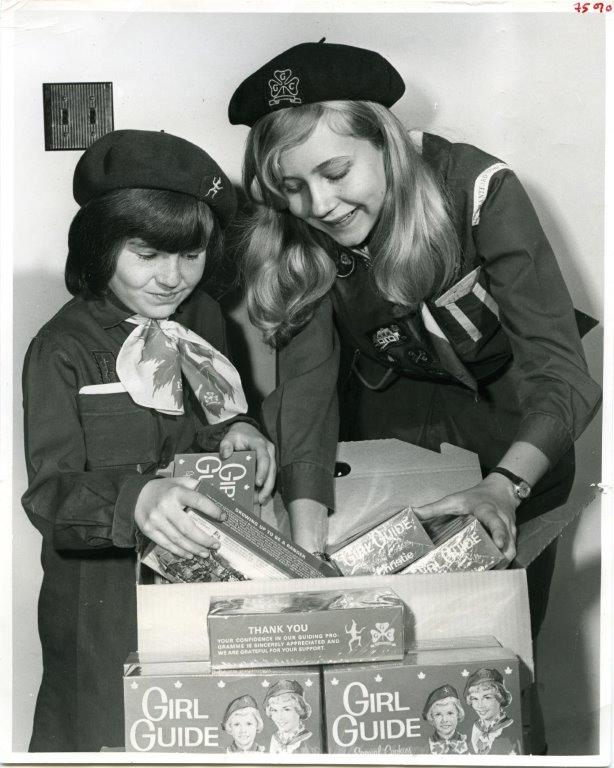
Girl guides in 1969 with cookie boxes to sell

Girl Guide Cookies are a tradition in Canada and were first baked in 1927 by a Guide leader, Christina Riepsamen, in Regina, Saskatchewan. They were sold door-to-door, with a bag of 12 cookies costing 10 cents (equivalent to CA$1.80 today), for the purpose of earning passenger rail fares for a camping trip to a lake. The sales were brisk, requiring extra batches to be baked to meet demand. It was then adopted as a simple way to raise money for uniforms and camping equipment.

In 1929, the National Headquarters began selling the cookies across Canada. Girl Guide cookies have gone through many recipe changes but the goals remain the same. Girl Guide cookies today are the largest fundraiser for the organization, and are used to help support the girls in their program and activities.

There are two different cookie campaigns, one in the fall and the other in the spring. The fall cookies are the chocolatey mint cookies, similar to the Girl Scout Thin Mints cookies sold in the United States. The classic vanilla and chocolate sandwich cookies are sold in the spring.

Manufactured by Christie's from 1960 to 2003, they are now made by Dare Foods Limited. This was due to Christie's inability to meet the Girl Guides' new "nut-free" requirement.

According to, modern Girl Guide Cookie history began in 1946:

- 1946—Introduction of vanilla crème cookie, maple cream and shortbread
- 1949—The embossed trefoil on the cookies was introduced in Ontario. The supplier was Barker-Bredin. The price is 25 cents a box (equivalent to CA$3.36 today).
- 1953—A box of 24 cookies is 35 cents (CA$4.10 today). The sandwich-type cookie, in vanilla & chocolate, is introduced
- 1955—The cookie supplier becomes Weston's, Canada. Price rises to 40 cents a box (CA$4.66 today).
- 1960—The supplier changes to Christie's. They make a special sugar-topped cookie to celebrate the 50th Jubilee of Guiding in Canada
- 1963—Girl Guides switches to plain cookies
- 1966—Vanilla & chocolate sandwich-type cookies brought back
- 1967—Canadian centennial cookies produced
- 1968—The price rises to 50 cents a box (CA$4.37 today)
- 1985—Special cookies to celebrate 75 years of Guiding in Canada
- 1993—Chocolate mint cookie introduced, starting in Ontario
- 1995—Chocolate mint cookie introduced to all provinces
- 2003—Supplier changes to Dare Foods.

== Centenary ==
Guiding Mosaic 2010 was held in from 8–17 July at Guelph Lake Conservation Area in Southern Ontario. Over 2,500 girls and women attended the camp. Participants came from across Canada as well as from many countries, including Australia, Bangladesh, Jamaica, Japan, New Zealand and the United States.

On 8 July 2010, Canada Post made a stamp to commemorate the centennial of the Girl Guides.
