= 1940 Toronto municipal election =

Municipal elections were held in Toronto, Ontario, Canada, on January 1, 1940. Incumbent Ralph Day was re-elected mayor. The election saw little change with all incumbent councillors and Board of Control members being reelected.

== Toronto mayor ==
Day was challenged for a second time by lawyer Lewis Duncan.

Results
Ralph Day - 61,480
Lewis Duncan - 38,011

== Board of Control ==
Two aldermen attempted to win seats on the Board of Control, David A. Balfour and communist Stewart Smith. Neither were successful as all four incumbents were reelected.

Results
Frederick J. Conboy (incumbent) - 78,672
Douglas McNish (incumbent) - 68,774
Fred Hamilton (incumbent) - 60,124
William J. Wadsworth (incumbent) - 55,756
David A. Balfour - 43,261
Stewart Smith - 19,641
Robert Harding - 6,548

== City council ==
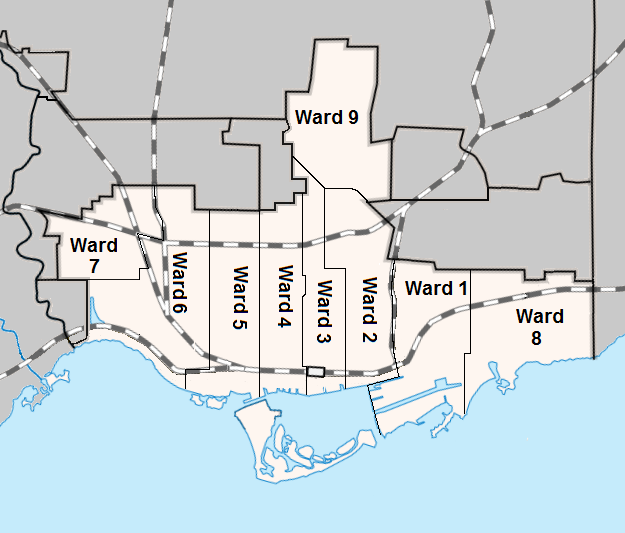
Ward boundaries used in the 1940 election

Ward 1 (Riverdale)
Gordon Millen (incumbent) - 8,901
Frank M. Johnston (incumbent) - 8,152
Charles Minett - 2,161
Harry Bell - 1,717
William Richards - 1,024

Ward 2 (Cabbagetown and Rosedale)
Louis Shannon (incumbent) - 5,593
Adelaide Plumptre (incumbent) - 5,272
Tupper Bigelow - 1,593
George Harris - 920
George A. Wilson - 559
James McCausland - 459

Ward 3 (Central Business District)
John S. Simmons (incumbent) - 3,983
Percy Quinn (incumbent) - 3,908
Jean Laing - 1,217

Ward 4 (The Annex, Kensington Market and Garment District)
Nathan Phillips (incumbent) - 5,427
Robert Hood Saunders - 4,900
Claude Pearce - 2,761
J.B. Salsberg - 2,154
Louis Zuker - 1,362
Lloyd Muritt - 381

Ward 5 (Trinity-Bellwoods
Ernest Bogart (incumbent) - 9,963
Charles Carrie - 7,556
Fred Collins - 2,686
Pat V. Roach - 1,534
Charles Lewis - 1,506
Charles Kerr - 1,149
Charles Graham - 572

Ward 6 (Davenport and Parkdale)
William V. Muir (incumbent) - 8,503
D.C. MacGregor (incumbent) - 8,213
George Robinson - 6,554
George Grannell - 5,792
Jack Bennett - 2,613
Richard Jones - 1,140
William Logie - 733

Ward 7 (West Toronto Junction)
Charles Rowntree (incumbent) - 6,395
H.M. Davy (incumbent) - 5,277
Frank Whetter - 2,893
Harold Clarke - 801
Harry Bradley - 518

Ward 8 (The Beaches)
Ernest Bray (incumbent) - 9,889
Walter Howell (incumbent) - 9,404
Hiram E. McCallum - 6,330
Ernest Woollon - 4,988

Ward 9 (North Toronto)
Donald Fleming (incumbent) - 8,154
John Innes (incumbent) - 7,186
Harry Kennedy - 6,690
William D. Ellis - 4,494
Douglas Hodder - 378

Results taken from the January 2, 1940 Globe and Mail and might not exactly match final tallies.
