= Charles Lindsey (editor) =

Canadian writer and officeholder (1820–1908)

- Born: 7 February 1820; Strubby, England
- Died: 12 April 1908 (aged 88); Toronto, Ontario, Canada
- Spouse: Janet Mackenzie

Charles Lindsey (7 February 1820 – 12 April 1908) was an English-born Canadian journalist, editor, writer, and officeholder. He was the first editor of the Toronto Leader and published a biography on his father-in-law William Lyon Mackenzie, The Life and Times of Wm. Lyon Mackenzie (1862).

== Life and career ==
Charles Lindsey was born 7 February 1820 in Strubby, England, as the third son of Charles and Susannah Lindsey. He graduated from a grammar school in Lincoln and apprenticed at a press there. At 22 he emigrated to the Province of Canada to find employment as a writer. He first joined the staff of a newspaper in Port Hope where he wrote with a Reform slant. In 1846 publisher James Lesslie hired him for the Reformist Toronto Examiner.

Lindsey became politically active and met regularly with those who were to form the Clear Grits faction in 1850, and gave voice to their views by publishing the North American with William McDougall. He was critical of Robert Baldwin and Louis-Hippolyte Lafontaine and opposed giving in to majority French-Canadian interests, writing "we shall get no real reforms from the French". The North American and Clear Grits lent its support to Francis Hincks, who became co-Premier in 1851. On 22 January 1852 Lindsey married Janet Mackenzie (d. 1906), a daughter of William Lyon Mackenzie. The couple had four sons and three daughters.

When James Beaty, Sr., founded the Toronto Leader in 1852 he hired Lindsey as editor. There, Lindsey put his support behind Hincks's government, to the consternation of many Reformers who had become disappointed with Hincks. Lindsey's politics were liberal and avoided the extremes of the Tories and the Grits. The paper came to rival Brown's Globe in influence. Lindsey was appointed an honorary commissioner to the 1855 World Exposition in Paris. In 1862 he published a biography of William Lyon Mackenzie, arguing the long-term positive effects of the Upper Canada Rebellion of 1837.

After a series of illnesses Lindsey left editorial work in 1867 to take a sinecure as registrar of deeds for Toronto, and continued to write political articles for the Mail, the Monetary Times, and the Canadian Monthly and National Review on issues such as free trade and separation of church and state. He became active in the nationalist Canada First movement, was a member of the movement's political arm, the Canadian National Association, edited the movement's organ The Nation, and named his son George Goldwin Smith after the Canada First co-founder Goldwin Smith.

Lindsey was an inaugural member of the Royal Society of Canada upon its founding in 1882. He continued as registrar of deeds of western Toronto until he retired in 1906. He died after a short illness at his son George's home on 12 April 1908 and was buried in the Mackenzie plot at the Toronto Necropolis.

== Political philosophy ==
Lindsey was a moderate reformer.

== Bibliography ==
- The Clergy Reserves (1851)
- Prohibitory Liquor Laws (1855)
- The Prairies of the Western States (1860)
- The Life and Times of Wm. Lyon Mackenzie (1862, two volumes)
- An Investigation of the Unsettled Boundaries of Ontario (1873)
- Rome in Canada (1877)

== Works cited ==
- Taylor, M. Brook (1994). "Lindsey, Charles". In Cook, Ramsay (ed.). Dictionary of Canadian Biography. Springer Science & Business Media. ISBN 978-0-8020-3998-9.
- Gray, Charlotte (1998). Mrs. King: the life and times of Isabel Mackenzie King. Toronto: Penguin Canada. ISBN 978-0-14-025367-2.
