= 1941 Toronto municipal election =

Municipal elections were held in Toronto, Ontario, Canada, on January 1, 1941. Frederick J. Conboy was elected mayor.

== Toronto mayor ==
The mayoralty was open following the retirement of Ralph Day. Two members of the Board of Control sought the seat, Frederick J. Conboy and Douglas McNish with Conboy winning by a significant margin.

Results
Frederick J. Conboy - 55,677
Douglas McNish - 33,024

== Board of Control ==
There were two open seats on the Board of Control as Conboy and McNish chose to run for mayor. These were won by former alderman and mayoral candidate Lewis Duncan and alderman Robert Hood Saunders. Finishing a close fifth was alderwoman Adelaide Plumptre, who was running to be the first woman elected to the Board. Aldermen Ernest Bray and David A. Balfour also ran for the Board, but finished some distance back.

Results
Lewis Duncan - 49,382
Fred Hamilton (incumbent) - 39,021
Robert Hood Saunders - 37,417
William J. Wadsworth (incumbent) - 33,411
Adelaide Plumptre - 33,021
Ernest Bray - 26,391
David A. Balfour - 20,849
J. Nelson Day - 4,645
Harry Bradley - 3,271
Robert Harding - 2,523

== City council ==
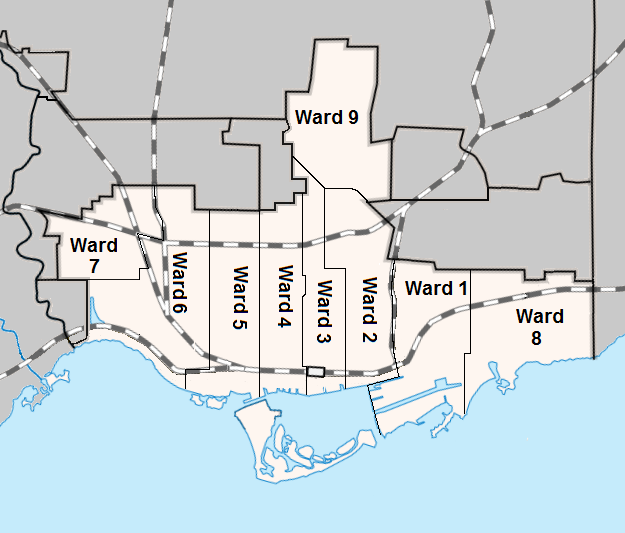
Ward boundaries used in the 1941 election

Ward 1 (Riverdale)
Gordon Millen (incumbent) - 6,240
Frank M. Johnston (incumbent) - 5,260
George Gresswell - 1,575
Harry Bell - 1,376
Charles Minett - 1,197

Ward 2 (Cabbagetown and Rosedale)
Louis Shannon (incumbent) - 4,670
William Dennison - 2,682
George A. Wilson - 2,640
W.B. Amy - 1,003
George Harris - 712

Ward 3 (Central Business District)
John S. Simmons (incumbent) - acclaimed
Percy Quinn (incumbent) - acclaimed

Ward 4 (The Annex, Kensington Market and Garment District)
Nathan Phillips (incumbent) - 3,829
Hugh Ross - 2,863
Herbert Orliffe - 1,917
David Goldstick - 1,381
Louis Zuker - 1,098
Joseph Gould - 1,009
Fred Sykes - 549

Ward 5 (Trinity-Bellwoods
Ernest Bogart (incumbent) - 7,519
Charles Carrie (incumbent) - 6,094
Gerrard McGrath - 2,082
Pat V. Roach - 1,282

Ward 6 (Davenport and Parkdale)
William V. Muir (incumbent) - 9,081
D.C. MacGregor (incumbent) - 7,411
Jack Bennett - 6,206
William Logie - 1,046
Nina Dean - 993

Ward 7 (West Toronto Junction)
Charles Rowntree (incumbent) - 5,322
H.M. Davy (incumbent) - 3,899
Frank Whetter - 2,907

Ward 8 (The Beaches)
Walter Howell (incumbent) - 7,266
Hiram E. McCallum - 4,927
Roy Cormack - 2,673
Frederick Baker - 2,484
Norman Caldwell - 2,484
Bertram Leavens - 1,854

Ward 9 (North Toronto)
John Innes (incumbent) - acclaimed
Donald Fleming (incumbent) - acclaimed

Results taken from the January 2, 1941 Globe and Mail and might not exactly match final tallies.

== Vacancy ==
Ward 1 Alderman Frank M. Johnston died on October 10, 1941, and was not replaced.
