= 1939 Toronto municipal election =

Municipal elections were held in Toronto, Ontario, Canada, on January 2, 1939. Incumbent Ralph Day was re-elected mayor over former lawyer Lewis Duncan.

== Toronto mayor ==
Day was expected to be acclaimed, but in December lawyer and Liberal Lewis Duncan entered the race. Day but won by a significant margin in a high turnout race.

Results
Ralph Day - 93,060
Lewis Duncan - 53,364

== Board of Control ==
All four Board of Control incumbents were reelected despite a group of high-profile challengers. Closest to winning a seat was Alderman William Croft in fifth place. In sixth place was communist Tim Buck and in seventh Alderman Robert Hood Saunders. Finishing surprisingly far back in eighth was former mayor William D. Robbins.

Neither were successful as all four incumbents were reelected.

Results
Frederick J. Conboy (incumbent) - 80,720
Douglas McNish (incumbent) - 73,252
Fred Hamilton (incumbent) - 54,516
William J. Wadsworth (incumbent) - 49,446
William Croft - 48,798
Tim Buck - 43,112
Robert Hood Saunders - 40,973
William D. Robbins - 24,745
Harry Bradley - 3,489

== City council ==
Ward 1 (Riverdale)
Gordon Millen (incumbent) - 9,583
Frank M. Johnston (incumbent) - 8,464
Charles Minett - 4,374
Fred Kantel - 3,063
John Francis Hughes - 1,414
Samuel Kirk - 735

Ward 2 (Cabbagetown and Rosedale)
Adelaide Plumptre (incumbent) - 6,563
Louis Shannon (incumbent) - 5,829
George A. Wilson - 4,184
D.J. Shannon - 1,434
Matthew C. Wilson - 615
Bob King - 541
Alfred Gagne - 536
Aaron Newton - 367

Ward 3 (Central Business District)
John S. Simmons (incumbent) - 5,325
Percy Quinn (incumbent) - 5,202
Jean Laing - 1,604

Ward 4 (The Annex, Kensington Market and Garment District)
Nathan Phillips (incumbent) - 7,230
David A. Balfour - 6,339
J.B. Salsberg (incumbent) - 5,830
Joseph Stewart - 1,216

Ward 5 (Trinity-Bellwoods
Ernest Bogart (incumbent) - 10,506
Stewart Smith (incumbent) - 8,121
Charles Ward - 6,519
Pat V. Roach - 2,943
Jacob Romer - 1,384
Frederick Cottrell - 697

Ward 6 (Davenport and Parkdale)
William V. Muir - 11,163
D.C. MacGregor (incumbent) - 10,319
George Grannell (incumbent) - 8,922
Neil Cameron - 7,878
Richard Jones - 1,384
William Logie - 1,166
Joseph King - 544

Ward 7 (West Toronto Junction)
Charles Rowntree (incumbent) - 8,901
H.M. Davy - 7,140
Harold Clarke - 1,858
John Whetton - 1,548

Ward 8 (The Beaches)
Ernest Bray (incumbent) - 13,175
Walter Howell (incumbent) - 10,094
Ernest Woollon - 7,104
Gifford Baker - 2,309

Ward 9 (North Toronto)
Donald Fleming - 11,340
John Innes - 10,134
William D. Ellis (incumbent) - 7,982
Basil Donnelly - 3,195

Results taken from the January 3, 1939 Globe and Mail and might not exactly match final tallies.
