= 1943 Toronto municipal election =

Municipal elections were held in Toronto, Ontario, Canada, on January 1, 1943. Incumbent Frederick J. Conboy was acclaimed as mayor. There was a very low voter turnout, but the election was a victory for the left as the Co-operative Commonwealth Federation (CCF) and Communist Party each won two seats.

== Toronto mayor ==
For the second time in a row no one chose to run against incumbent Frederick J. Conboy and he was acclaimed as mayor.

Results
Frederick J. Conboy - acclaimed

== Board of Control ==
All incumbents were re-elected Board of Control.

Results
Lewis Duncan (incumbent) - 40,060
Robert Hood Saunders (incumbent) - 33,081
Fred Hamilton (incumbent) - 28,919
William J. Wadsworth (incumbent) - 27,031
C.E. Reynolds - 26,194
Minerva Reid - 18,320
J.C. Irwin - 16,860
G.P. Granell - 5,010
Harry Bradley - 3,590

== City council ==
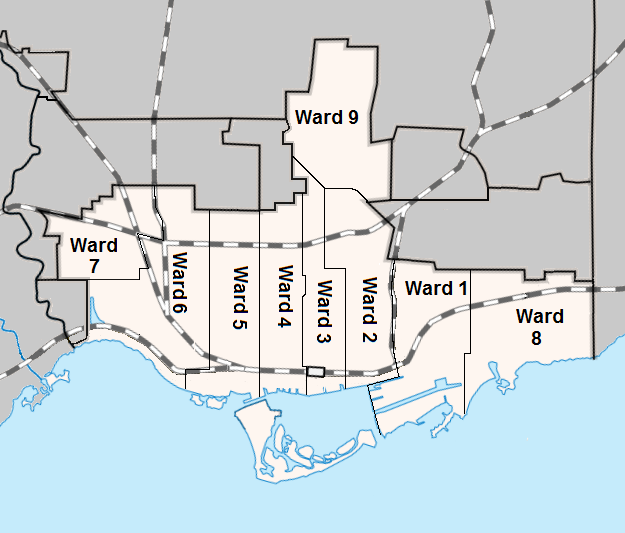
Ward boundaries used in the 1943 election

Ward 1 (Riverdale)
Leslie Saunders (incumbent) - 3,743
Gordon Millen (incumbent) - 3,715
R.E. Wright - 2,333
W.S.B. Armstrong - 1,291

Ward 2 (Cabbagetown and Rosedale)
Louis Shannon (incumbent) - 3,452
William Dennison - 2,907
Henry Glendinning (incumbent) - 2,783

Ward 3 (West Downtown and Summerhill)
John Frank - 1,648
John S. Simmons (incumbent) - 1,396
W.R. Shaw - 1,078
Marjorie Garrow - 635
Harold Fishleigh - 462

Ward 4 (The Annex, Kensington Market and Garment District)
J. B. Salsberg - 4,783
Nathan Phillips (incumbent) - 2,472
David Balfour (incumbent) - 2,432
Herbert Orliffe - 2,093
William Condle - 290

Ward 5 (Trinity-Bellwoods
Stewart Smith - 5,186
Ernest Bogart (incumbent) - 4,653
C.M. Carrie (incumbent) - 3,423
Maxwell Armstrong - 1,422

Ward 6 (Davenport and Parkdale)
William V. Muir (incumbent) - 4,413
Jack Bennett - 3,750
Kenneth Bert McKellar - 3,007
Robert Stuart - 2,439
F.G. McBrien - 2,098
George Harris - 1,514
H.E. Lister - 746
Nina Dean - 624
H.B. Branscombe - 539
R.M. Wilson - 398

Ward 7 (West Toronto Junction)
Charles Rowntree (incumbent) - 3,749
E.C. Roelofson - 2,242
William C. Davidson (incumbent) - 2,169
Eva Sanderson - 1,757

Ward 8 (The Beaches)
Hiram E. McCallum (incumbent) - 5,195
Walter Howell (incumbent) - 4,725
E.S. McGuinness - 2,606
H.L. McKinstry - 2,335

Ward 9 (North Toronto)
John Innes (incumbent) - 6,479
Donald Fleming (incumbent) - 6,301
Christine McCarty - 3,123

Results taken from the January 2, 1943 Globe and Mail and might not exactly match final tallies.
