= 1944 Toronto municipal election =

Canadian elections

Municipal elections were held in Toronto, Ontario, Canada, on January 1, 1944. Incumbent Frederick J. Conboy defeated Controller Lewis Duncan. The election was a notable defeat for the Co-operative Commonwealth Federation (CCF, a social democratic party) as it lost all representation on city council.

== Toronto mayor ==
Conboy had served as mayor since 1940 and was seeking his fourth term of office. He was opposed by CCFer Lewis Duncan who had also run and lost in 1939 and 1940.

Results
Frederick J. Conboy - 78,383
Lewis Duncan - 58,712

== Board of Control ==
The Board of Control had one open seat due to Duncan's run for mayor. Alderman William Dennison attempted to hold the seat for the CCF, but finished in distant seventh. Three other former aldermen ran for the seat Hiram E. McCallum, David Balfour, and communist Stewart Smith with Balfour winning the seat.

Results
Robert Hood Saunders (incumbent) - 73,383
Fred Hamilton (incumbent) - 52,694
William J. Wadsworth (incumbent) - 52,485
David Balfour - 50,599
Hiram E. McCallum - 50,337
Stewart Smith - 41,277
William Dennison - 30,026
William Muir - 19,061
Harry Bradley - 7,743

== City council ==
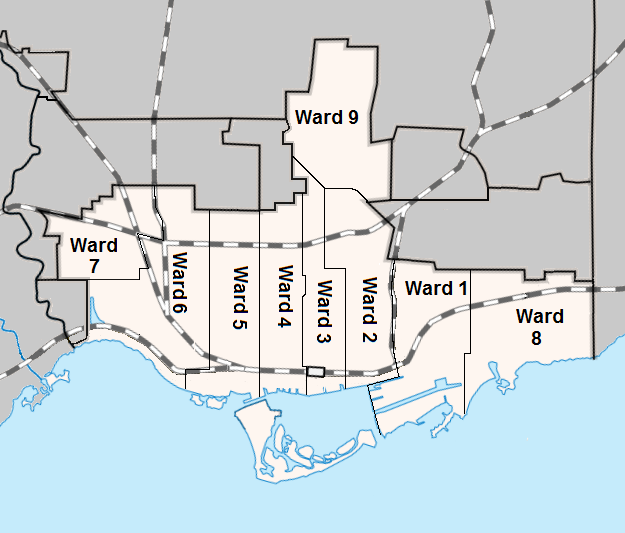
Ward boundaries used in the 1944 election

Ward 1 (Riverdale)
Leslie Saunders (incumbent) - 7,999
Gordon Millen (incumbent) - 7,758
John McGuigan - 3,444
Stanley Ryerson - 1,959
Irene Humble - 1,475

Ward 2 (Cabbagetown and Rosedale)
Louis Shannon (incumbent) - 5,798
George A. Wilson - 4,432
Henry Glendinning - 2,538
May Birchard - 2,179
Harold Toye - 1,819
Gordon W. Armstrong - 819

Ward 3 (West Downtown and Summerhill)
John S. Simmons (incumbent) - 3,132
Harold Fishleigh - 2,915
John Frank (incumbent) - 1,917
J.R. Huffman - 909
William Smith - 488
Marjorie Garrow - 439
Charles Lewis - 408
Francis Burns - 321

Ward 4 (The Annex, Kensington Market and Garment District)
Nathan Phillips (incumbent) - 4,951
Norman Freed - 4,211
H.A. Ross - 3,829
Herbert Orliffe - 2,797
Charles Hamilton - 1,569

Ward 5 (Trinity-Bellwoods
Ernest Bogart (incumbent) - 7,083
Charles Sims - 7,016
Arthur Frost - 5,337
Harold Menzies - 3,473
Maxwell Armstrong - 2,460

Ward 6 (Davenport and Parkdale)
Kenneth Bert McKellar - 8,903
Harold Timmins - 8,622
Jack Bennett (incumbent) - 6,707
George Granell - 3,749
Dewar Ferguson - 3,015
Patrick O'Donovan - 2,567
Nina Dean - 2,238
Patrick McKeown - 627
Charles Dymond - 469

Ward 7 (West Toronto Junction)
Charles Rowntree (incumbent) - 7,393
E.C. Roelofson (incumbent) - 5,542
Eva Sanderson - 2,756
Frank Cormack - 2,118

Ward 8 (The Beaches)
Walter Howell (incumbent) - 9,431
William Collings - 6,542
Murray Cotterill - 5,833
E.S. McGuinness - 5,377
H.L. McKinstry - 3,990
J.E. McMillan - 2,102

Ward 9 (North Toronto)
John Innes (incumbent) - 14,252
Donald Fleming (incumbent) - 13,948
R.M. McLean - 3,499
Christien McCarty - 2,174

Results taken from the January 3, 1944 Globe and Mail and might not exactly match final tallies.
