= 1942 Toronto municipal election =

Municipal elections were held in Toronto, Ontario, Canada, on January 1, 1942. Incumbent Frederick J. Conboy was acclaimed as mayor.

== Toronto mayor ==
For the second election in a row no one chose to run against incumbent Frederick J. Conboy and he was acclaimed as mayor.

Results
Frederick J. Conboy - acclaimed

== Board of Control ==
The Board of Control election was marked by former mayor Ralph Day attempting to return to the Board, but he placed fifth as all four incumbents were reelected.

Results
Lewis Duncan (incumbent) - 41,656
Robert Hood Saunders (incumbent) - 28,923
Fred Hamilton (incumbent) - 28,853
William J. Wadsworth (incumbent) - 27,022
Ralph Day - 24,208
Minerva Reid - 20,337
J.C. Irwin - 18,272
N. Macmillan - 5,179
Harry Bradley - 3,102

== City council ==
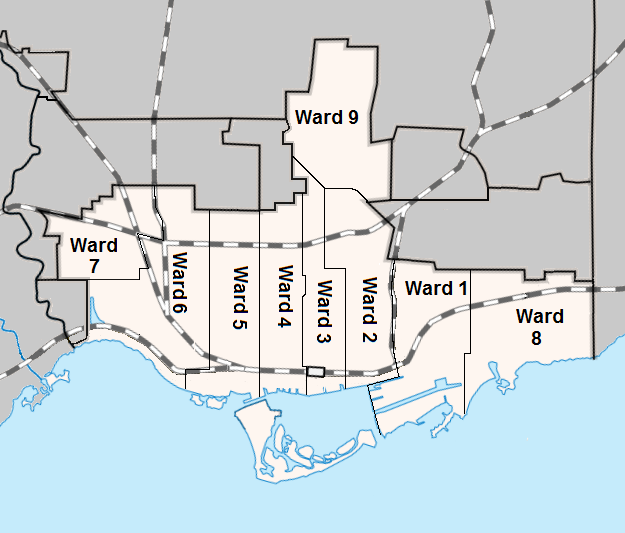
Ward boundaries used in the 1942 election

Ward 1 (Riverdale)
Leslie Saunders - 3,898
Gordon Millen (incumbent) - 3,832
W.S.B. Armstrong - 1,700
R.A. Allen - 1,512
H. Bell - 1,033
George Gresswell - 910

Ward 2 (Cabbagetown and Rosedale)
Louis Shannon (incumbent) - 3,175
Henry Glendinning - 3,148
William Dennison (incumbent) - 3,036

Ward 3 (Central Business District)
John S. Simmons (incumbent) - 1,396
Percy Quinn (incumbent) - 1,266
H.E. Wallace - 1,233
J.N. Mullholland - 530
J. Lang - 464
Harold Fishleigh - 166

Ward 4 (The Annex, Kensington Market and Garment District)
Nathan Phillips (incumbent) - 2,575
David Balfour - 1,964
Herbert Orliffe - 1,823
David Goldstick - 1,793
Hugh Ross (incumbent) - 1,123
Joseph Gould - 697
M. Kaschuck - 277

Ward 5 (Trinity-Bellwoods
Ernest Bogart (incumbent) - 5,502
C.M. Carrie (incumbent) - 4,025
Douglas Carr - 2,189

Ward 6 (Davenport and Parkdale)
William V. Muir (incumbent) - 6,022
D.C. MacGregor (incumbent) - 4,901
Jack Bennett - 4,525
George Harris - 1,672
Nina Dean - 916
R. Harding - 683

Ward 7 (West Toronto Junction)
Charles Rowntree (incumbent) - 3,707
William C. Davidson - 2,398
F.G.I Whetter - 1,605
C.V. Pratt - 1,098
H.H. Clark - 897
M. Nichols - 625

Ward 8 (The Beaches)
Hiram E. McCallum (incumbent) - 5,188
Walter Howell (incumbent) - 4,784
E.S. McGuinness - 2,483
R. Cormack - 2,247

Ward 9 (North Toronto)
John Innes (incumbent) - 4,633
Donald Fleming (incumbent) - 4,573
Christine McCarty - 3,237
L.V. Baldwin - 2,532
W.G. Ellis - 2,123

Results taken from the January 2, 1942 Globe and Mail and might not exactly match final tallies.

== Vacancy ==
Ward 6 Alderman D.C. MacGregor died on November 28, 1942, and was not replaced.
