= The Toronto Daily Telegraph =

The Toronto Daily Telegraph was a conservative newspaper founded by John Ross Robertson in 1866 after he left The Globe, a Liberal-leaning paper, to establish a Conservative-leaning paper.

Launched on May 21, 1866, it initially ran a daily and evening version and was a pro-British voice against increasing American influence a year before Confederation.

The paper was never profitable and debt led to the folding of the morning edition in May 1872. The paper's debt woes continued; unable to obtain financial support from the Conservative elite in Toronto, the broadsheet folded in June 1872.

Robertson returned to The Globe and later established the successor to the Telegraph, Toronto Telegram, in 1876.

== See also ==
Other conservative papers before and after the Telegraph:

- The Mail and Empire 1895–
  - The Toronto Mail 1872–1895
  - Toronto Empire 1887–1895
- The Toronto World 1880–1924
- Toronto Leader
- Toronto Telegram 1876–1971
- Toronto Sun 1971–present
- National Post 1998–present
