= Douglas McNish =

Toronto lawyer and politician

Joseph Douglas McNish,QC, known as J. Douglas McNish (1895-1983) was a Toronto lawyer and politician who served on Toronto City Council and the Toronto Board of Control in the 1930s and early 1940s and ran unsuccessfully for Mayor of Toronto in 1941. He later served as chairman of the Toronto Harbour Commission in the 1960s.

McNish was born in Blantyre, South Lanarkshire, Scotland in 1895 where his father was a headmaster. He emigrated to Canada in 1912, settling in Toronto. He joined the Canadian Expeditionary Force during World War I where he served with the Canadian Military Engineers for four years in Europe and was awarded the Military Medal for bravery. After the war, he studied law at Osgoode Hall Law School.

In the 1935 Toronto municipal election he was elected to Toronto city council as an alderman for Ward 9 in North Toronto and was re-elected in the January 1936 Toronto municipal election. He first stood for the Board of Control in the December 1936 Toronto municipal election but was defeated. He won a seat on the Board of Control in the 1937 Toronto municipal election and was re-elected in 1939 and 1940. in the 1941 Toronto municipal election he and fellow Controller Frederick J. Conboy both ran for mayor with Conboy winning 55,677 votes to McNish's 33,024. He retired from politics, serving as a magistrate before returning to his law practice until 1979 when he suffered a stroke. McNish was an organizer for the Liberal Party of Canada in the 1940s and 1950s. He was appointed to the Toronto Harbour Commission and served as its chairman from 1967 until 1969. He continued to serve as a commissioner until retiring in 1971.
