= Albert Edward Kemp =

Canadian politician (1858–1929)

The Honourable Sir Albert Edward Kemp PC KCMG
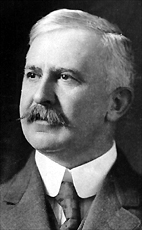

Member of Parliament for Toronto East (2nd time)
- In office 1911–1921
- Preceded by: Joseph Russell
- Succeeded by: Edmond Baird Ryckman

Member of Parliament for Toronto East (1st time)
- In office 1900–1908
- Preceded by: John Ross Robertson
- Succeeded by: Joseph Russell

Personal details
- Born: August 11, 1858 Saint-Georges-de-Clarenceville, Canada East
- Died: August 12, 1929 (aged 71) Pigeon Lake, Ontario, Canada
- Party: Liberal-Conservative
- Other political affiliations: Unionist
- Spouse(s): Cecilia Amanda Wilson; Virginia Norton Copping
- Children: 4
- Profession: Businessman

Sir Albert Edward Kemp PC KCMG (August 11, 1858 – August 12, 1929) was a Canadian businessman and politician. Kemp was a Canadian Minister of Militia and Defence and Minister of Overseas Military Forces during World War I. A Conservative and Unionist, Kemp was elected five times to the House of Commons of Canada as the Member of Parliament for electoral district of Toronto East. He was appointed to the Senate of Canada by Prime Minister Arthur Meighen in 1921.

== Background ==
Edward Kemp was born in Saint-Georges-de-Clarenceville, Quebec in what was then Canada East. Kemp's father was a farmer and country merchant who was an immigrant from Yorkshire, England; his mother was Canadian-born. He was raised near the village of Clarenceville, where he attended Clarenceville Academy, and later studied at the academy in Lacolle, excelling in mathematics, but he did not finish. Leaving home at 16, Kemp headed to Montreal and eventually gaining employment as a bookkeeper at a hardware store.

== Business ambition ==
At the age of 20, Kemp became engaged to Cecilia Wilson. Soon afterwards, he and a partner opened a manufacturing and retailing shop on St Catherine Street in Montreal. He and Cecilia moved to Toronto in 1885, where he entered into partnership with Thomas McDonald, owner of the struggling Dominion Tin and Stamping Works. In 1888 Kemp bought out McDonald and formed the Kemp Manufacturing Company with his younger brother, William Arthur, who had left the lumber trade in Quebec to apply his talents in Toronto. Kemp served as president of the Canadian Manufacturers' Association in 1895 and 1896, and as president of the Toronto Board of Trade in 1899 and 1900. The brothers expanded their operations and opened plants in Montreal and Winnipeg, eventually reorganizing their business as the Sheet Metal Products Company of Canada Limited in 1911.

== Political ambition ==
Kemp was elected five times to the House of Commons of Canada as the Member of Parliament for the Ontario electoral district of Toronto East. He was first elected in the Canadian federal election of 1900, and was re-elected in 1904. He lost in 1908 to an "independent Conservative", Joseph Russell, who had been nominated by some constituents who were unhappy with Kemp's connections to the Albany Club and Toronto's wealthy class, and who also charged that Kemp was hiring foreign workers at low wages at the expense of Canadians. Out of office, Kemp threw his efforts into rebuilding the Conservative machine in Ontario as well as paying off its debts. He used his business connections to rally opposition to the Laurier government's Naval Service Act as well as its plans for reciprocity with the United States - a campaign to which he recruited prominent Ontario Liberals. Through Kemp's efforts, he regained his seat in 1911 and helped Robert Borden defeat Laurier to become prime minister. Borden rewarded Kemp by appointing him minister without portfolio in his first Cabinet.

== World War I ==
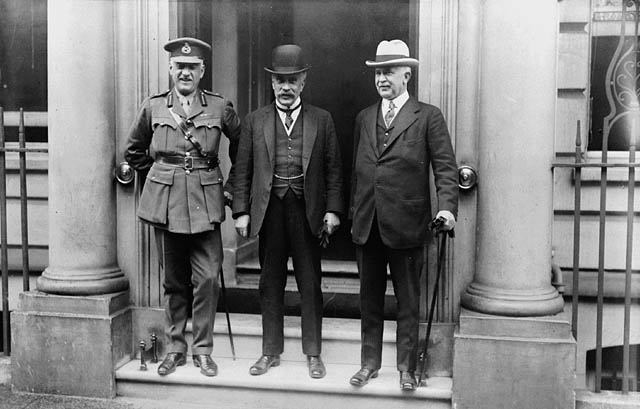
Sydney Chilton Mewburn, Robert Borden, and Albert Kemp in London, England in July 1918

During World War I Kemp sat as a Unionist in the coalition government formed under Robert Borden. Kemp played an increasingly important part in the government of Canada during the war years. In 1915 he was appointed chairman of the War Purchasing Commission; in 1916, he succeeded Sam Hughes as Minister of Militia and Defence; and in 1917 he went to London as Minister of Overseas Military Forces of Canada, a portfolio which he retained until the demobilization of the Canadian overseas forces was completed. In 1918 he was a member of the Imperial War Cabinet; and in 1919 he was one of the commissioners representing Canada at the Paris Peace Conference. For his service during World War I, he was made a Knight Commander of the Order of St Michael and St George in 1917.

On November 4, 1921, Kemp was appointed to the Senate of Canada on the recommendation of Prime Minister Arthur Meighen. He represented the senatorial division of Toronto, Ontario until his death.

== Personal ==
Kemp married Cecilia Amanda Wilson (1858–1924) in 1879 and had three daughters: Alice Irene (Mrs. Walter Scott Waldie), Hazel Beatrice (Mrs. Francis Chattan Stephens), and Florence Evelyn (Mrs. Albert Henry Proctor).

Hazel married Captain F. Chattan Stephens of Montreal, who was a son of liberal politician George Washington Stephens and half-brother to Saar president George Washington Stephens Jr. Their only son, John H. C. Stephens, and F. Chattan's mother, Frances McIntosh Stephens, perished in the sinking of the RMS Lusitania in 1915.

After the death of his first wife Kemp remarried to Virginia Norton Copping on March 3, 1925. By her first marriage to Norman Judson Copping she had two daughters, Cynthia Dana Copping and Virginia Norton Copping. Norman Copping's parents, George R. and Emma (Black) Copping, were victims of the RMS Lusitania as well. With Virginia, Kemp had another daughter, Katharine Edward Hanley Kemp Cross (1926–2001).

Albert Edward Kemp died at Pigeon Lake in 1929 and was buried in Mount Pleasant Cemetery, Toronto.

He was a member of the Orange Order.

Coat of arms of Albert Edward Kemp
Crest A dexter arm embowed in armour fesswise the hand holding a broken sword proper hilt and pommel Or between two roses Argent barbed and seeded proper. Escutcheon Per fess wavy Gules and barry wavy Argent and Azure, in chief a lion rampant between two garbs Or. Motto PER ARDUA STABILIS ESTO

== Archives ==
There are Albert Edward Kemp fonds at Library and Archives Canada and the University of Toronto.

== Electoral record ==
1904 Canadian federal election: Toronto East
Party	Candidate	Votes	%	±%
Conservative	Albert Edward Kemp	4,125		
Liberal	John Knox Leslie	1,993		

1908 Canadian federal election: Toronto East
Party	Candidate	Votes	%	±%
Independent	Joseph Russell	4,039		
Conservative	Albert Edward Kemp	3,246		

1911 Canadian federal election: Toronto East
Party	Candidate	Votes	%	±%
Conservative	Albert Edward Kemp	7,082		
Independent	Joseph Russell	2,281		
Liberal	James Pearson	1,878		
Labour	James Richards	463		

By-election: On Mr. Kemp being appointed Minister of Militia and Defence, 14 December 1916: Toronto East
Party	Candidate	Votes	%	±%
Conservative	Albert Edward Kemp	acclaimed		

1917 Canadian federal election: Toronto East
Party	Candidate	Votes	%	±%
Government	Albert Edward Kemp	15,894		
Opposition	John Tristam Vick	4,399		

10th Canadian Ministry (1917–1920) – Unionist cabinet of Robert Borden
Cabinet posts (3)
Predecessor	Office	Successor
George Halsey Perley	Minister of Overseas Military Forces; 1917–1920	none
Sam Hughes	Minister of Militia and Defence; 1916–1917	Sydney Chilton Mewburn
none	Minister Without Portfolio; 1911–1916	none
