= 1961 Progressive Conservative Party of Ontario leadership election =

- Date: October 25, 1961
- Convention: Varsity Arena, Toronto
- Resigning leader: Leslie Frost
- Won by: John Robarts
- Ballots: 6
- Candidates: 7

A Progressive Conservative Party of Ontario leadership election was held on October 25, 1961 to replace retiring Progressive Conservative leader and incumbent premier Leslie Frost. The party selected John Robarts on the sixth ballot.

First ballot:

- ROBERTS, Kelso 352
- ROBARTS, John 345
- MACAULAY, Robert 339
- ALLAN, James 332
- DOWNER, A.W. 149
- DYMOND, Matthew 148
- WARDROPE, George 45

Second ballot:

- ROBARTS, John 423
- ROBERTS, Kelso 385
- MACAULAY, Robert 363
- ALLAN, James 324
- DOWNER, A.W. 104
- DYMOND, Matthew 93

Third ballot:

- ROBARTS, John 498
- ROBERTS, Kelso 380
- MACAULAY, Robert 372
- ALLAN, James 344
- DOWNER, A.W. 93

Fourth ballot:

- ROBARTS, John 533
- ROBERTS, Kelso 419
- MACAULAY, Robert 377
- ALLAN, James 336

Fifth ballot:

- ROBARTS, John 746
- ROBERTS, Kelso 479
- MACAULAY, Robert 438

Sixth ballot:

- ROBARTS, John 976
- ROBERTS, Kelso 633

See also: Progressive Conservative Party of Ontario leadership conventions
