= William Summerville =

Canadian politician

Ontario MPP
- In office 1937–1943
- Preceded by: Robert Allen
- Succeeded by: Leslie Wismer
- Constituency: Riverdale

Member of Toronto Board of Control
- In office 1929–1930

Toronto Ward 1 Alderman
- In office 1922-1929, 1935-1937

Personal details
- Born: July 8, 1879 Cargill, Bruce County, Ontario
- Died: November 19, 1958 (aged 79) Toronto, Ontario
- Party: Progressive Conservative
- Spouse: Alberta White
- Children: 3
- Occupation: Real estate manager, musician

William Arthur Summerville (July 8, 1879 – November 19, 1958) was a municipal and provincial politician in Ontario, Canada. He was a Progressive Conservative member of the Legislative Assembly of Ontario from 1937 to 1943 who represented the downtown Toronto riding of Riverdale. From 1922 to 1937 he was a municipal politician in Toronto.

== Background ==
Summerville was born in Cargill, Bruce County on July 8, 1879 and moved with his family to Toronto at age three. His first career was as a musician. He played cornet for the 48th Highlanders and toured North America with different theatre orchestras. He also became a locally popular songwriter, with tunes like "Yes, Danforth".

He settled in the east part of Toronto and became active in the theatre and real estate business. He became the owner of a small chain of theatres that presented both vaudeville shows and movies. He built structures such as the Prince of Wales Theatre at Woodbine and Danforth. He was also into real estate beginning in 1908 and founded his own firm (Summerville Properities) in 1912. He and his wife, Alberta, raised three children.

== Politics ==
Summerville's first election victory was as a Toronto Board of Education trustee in 1920 and then elected as Toronto City Council Ward 1 (Riverdale) alderman from 1922 to 1929. Summerville was elected to the Toronto Board of Control in 1929. His election caused controversy when it was discovered he was on arrears on some of his municipal taxes, and was thus ineligible to run and to take his seat on the board. As a result, a by-election was called. Summerville, having paid his taxes, was allowed to run and he won the seat by a considerable margin. He stayed on the Board of Control for two years but lost his seat in 1930. He returned to council as Ward 1 alderman in 1935 and remained for two years until he was elected to the provincial legislature.

In 1937 he was elected as the Conservative MPP for the riding of Riverdale. He served until 1943 when he was defeated by Leslie Wismer of the CCF.

Summerville's son Donald Summerville was elected to city council in 1955 for Ward 1 and was elected mayor in 1963, but died suddenly only months after his term in office. Donald's older brother William's grandson Paul Summerville was an NDP candidate in the 2006 federal election.
