= Riverdale (provincial electoral district) =

Former provincial electoral district in Ontario, Canada

Ontario electoral district
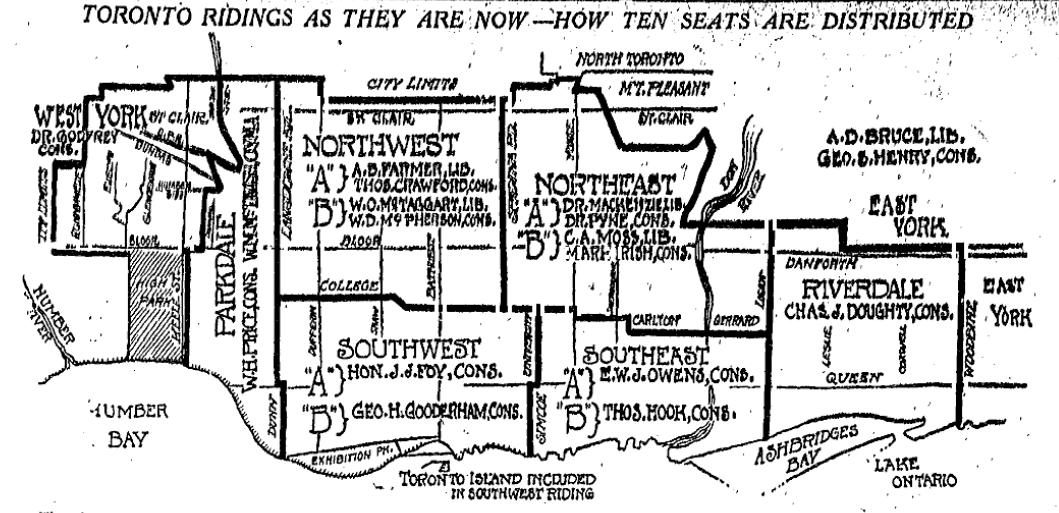
- Riverdale, in relation to the other Toronto ridings, after the 1914 redistribution.

Defunct provincial electoral district
- Legislature: Legislative Assembly of Ontario
- District created: 1914
- District abolished: 1996
- First contested: 1914
- Last contested: 1995

Riverdale was a provincial riding in Ontario, Canada that existed from 1914 to 1999. It occupied an area east of the Don River from the city limits just north of Danforth Avenue south to Lake Ontario. It was named after the neighbourhood of Riverdale. In 1999 a major reduction in Ontario seats resulted in Riverdale being merged with part of East York into a larger riding called Broadview-Greenwood.

The 1964 by-election in this riding is well known for being among the first elections in Canadian history where a party (the NDP) used door to door canvassing and a get out the vote effort.

== Boundaries ==
In 1914 the riding was created out of the Toronto East riding. Its initial borders were Logan Avenue from Ashbridges Bay to the city limits just north of the Danforth. The northern boundary followed the city limits with East York east to Woodbine Avenue. The eastern boundary followed this road south to the lake.

In 1926 five ridings were added to Toronto. Three new ridings were created to the east of Riverdale called Greenwood, Woodbine and Beaches. The borders of Riverdale were altered to accommodate the new ridings. The western boundary was moved west to the Don River and this encompassed parts of the old Toronto Southeast and Toronto Northeast ridings. The eastern boundary was moved to Carlaw Avenue which bordered Greenwood riding.

Prior to the 1934 election, the riding of Greenwood was dissolved and split between Beaches riding to the east and Riverdale to the west. The new western boundary became Jones Avenue from Queen Street East to Danforth Avenue. North of Danforth Avenue the boundary continued along Dewhurst Avenue and south of Queen Street the boundary continued along Berkshire Avenue and south to the lake.

In 1966 the boundaries on the east and west sides were altered. To the west it was moved east from the banks of the Don River. Instead it started on the south where Carlaw Avenue met Toronto Harbour. It went north along Carlaw to Queen Street East, then west along Queen to DeGrassi St. It went north along DeGrassi until Gerrard, west along Gerrard until Broadview Avenue, north along Broadview until Sparkhall Avenue, east along Sparkhall until Hampton Avenue and north along Hampton until it reached Danforth Avenue. North of Danforth it continued along Jackman Avenue until it reached the city limits. On the east side, next to the neighbouring riding of Beaches-Woodbine, the border started at the lake and went north along Coxwell Avenue to Queen Street East. A one block jog west and then it went north along Rhodes Avenue to the Danforth. At Danforth it jogged back east to Coxwell and then followed this street north to the city limits.

In 1974 the eastern boundary with Beaches-Woodbine was altered. The new border consisted of Coxwell Avenue from Lake Ontario north to the railway right-of-way just south of Hanson Street. The boundary followed the right-of-way west until Greenwood Avenue. It then went north along Greenwood until it met the city limits.

The boundaries were further altered in 1987. The western boundary was moved back to the Don River. This was followed north to the Toronto city limits. Going east it followed the city limits to Coxwell Avenue. It turned south following Coxwell to the Canadian National Railway right-of-way. It went west along the right-of-way turning south following Greenwood Avenue to Queen Street East, then west to Leslie Street, and then south to Lake Ontario.

It was merged into the riding of merged into the Toronto-Danforth in 1996 prior to the election in 1999.

== Members of Provincial Parliament ==
Riverdale
Assembly	Years	Member	Party
prior to 1914 part of the Toronto East riding
14th	1914–1919	Joseph Russell	Conservative
15th	1919–1923	Joseph McNamara	Soldier
16th	1923–1926	George Oakley	Conservative
17th	1926–1929	George Oakley	Conservative
18th	1929–1934	George Oakley	Conservative
19th	1934–1937	Robert Allen	Liberal
20th	1937–1943	William Summerville (Note: In 1938, the title of Member of the Legislative Assembly was officially changed to Member of Provincial Parliament. Previously, it was unofficially used in the media and in the Legislature.)	Progressive Conservative
21st	1943–1945	Leslie Wismer	Co-operative Commonwealth
22nd	1945–1948	Gordon Millen	Progressive Conservative
23rd	1948–1951	Leslie Wismer	Co-operative Commonwealth
24th	1951–1955	Robert Macaulay (Note: Macaulay resigned his seat midway through the 25th legislature which forced a by-election.)	Progressive Conservative
25th	1955–1959	Robert Macaulay	Progressive Conservative
26th	1959–1963	Robert Macaulay	Progressive Conservative
27th	1963–1964	Robert Macaulay	Progressive Conservative
27th	1964–1967	Jim Renwick (Note: Renwick died in office 28 November 1984 but the 1985 election was held before a by-election could be called.)	New Democratic
28th	1967–1971	Jim Renwick	New Democratic
29th	1971–1975	Jim Renwick	New Democratic
30th	1975–1977	Jim Renwick	New Democratic
31st	1977–1981	Jim Renwick	New Democratic
32nd	1981–1984	Jim Renwick	New Democratic
33rd	1985–1987	David Reville	New Democratic
34th	1987–1990	David Reville	New Democratic
35th	1990–1995	Marilyn Churley	New Democratic
36th	1995–1999	Marilyn Churley	New Democratic
Sourced from the Ontario Legislative Assembly
Merged into the Broadview-Greenwood after 1999

== Election results ==
=== 1987 electoral boundaries ===
1995 Ontario general election
Party	Candidate	Votes	%	±%
New Democratic	Marilyn Churley	10,948	46.88	–15.09
Progressive Conservative	John Gamble	6,348	27.18	+20.24
Liberal	Frank Lowery	5,443	23.31	–1.21
Independent	Pat Marquis	273	1.17	–23.35
Green	Marianna Tzabiras	217	0.93	–2.64
Natural Law	Loucas Café	124	0.53	–
Total valid votes		23,353	98.45	
Total rejected, unmarked and declined ballots		367	1.55	–0.52
Turnout		23,720	64.66	+2.21
Eligible voters		36,682		
New Democratic hold		Swing		–17.67
Source: Elections Ontario

1990 Ontario general election
Party	Candidate	Votes	%	±%
New Democratic	Marilyn Churley	14,086	61.97	+17.08
Liberal	Pat Marquis	5,572	24.51	–12.68
Progressive Conservative	John Ruffolo	1,578	6.94	–7.35
Green	Leanne Haze	811	3.57	+2.13
Libertarian	Daniel (Danny) Hunt	682	3.00	+1.73
Total valid votes		22,729	97.93	
Total rejected, unmarked and declined ballots		480	2.07	+1.22
Turnout		23,209	62.45	+1.61
Eligible voters		37,162		
New Democratic hold		Swing		+14.88
Source: Elections Ontario

1987 Ontario general election
Party	Candidate	Votes	%	±%
New Democratic	David Reville	10,321	44.89	–7.26
Liberal	Jim Karygiannis	8,552	37.20	+16.33
Progressive Conservative	Bob Dodd	3,285	14.29	–9.97
Green	Debora Bojman	330	1.44	+0.42
Libertarian	Byron J. Garby	292	1.27	–
Communist	Maggie Bizzell	210	0.91	–0.79
Total valid votes		22,990	99.15	
Total rejected ballots		197	0.85	–0.12
Turnout		23,187	60.84	–0.73
Eligible voters		38,110		
New Democratic hold		Swing		–11.80
Source: Elections Ontario

=== 1974 electoral boundaries ===
1985 Ontario general election
Party	Candidate	Votes	%	±%
New Democratic	David Reville	9,869	52.16	+5.42
Progressive Conservative	Bret Snider	4,590	24.26	–3.96
Liberal	Doug DeMille	3,949	20.87	–1.48
Communist	Maggie Bizzell	322	1.70	+0.61
Green	Michael Tegtmeyer	192	1.01	–
Total valid votes		18,922	99.03	
Total rejected ballots		186	0.97	–0.13
Turnout		19,108	61.57	+12.09
Eligible voters		31,033		
New Democratic hold		Swing		+4.69
Source: Elections Ontario

1981 Ontario general election
Party	Candidate	Votes	%	±%
New Democratic	Jim Renwick	6,770	46.73	–9.06
Progressive Conservative	Peter Hesky	4,088	28.22	+3.39
Liberal	Ed Schofield	3,237	22.35	+6.02
Independent	Thelma R. Forsyth	233	1.61	–
Communist	Anna Sideris	158	1.09	–0.15
Total valid votes		14,486	98.89	
Total rejected ballots		162	1.11	+0.23
Turnout		14,648	49.48	–6.82
Eligible voters		29,602		
New Democratic hold		Swing		–6.23
Source: Elections Ontario

1977 Ontario general election
Party	Candidate	Votes	%	±%
New Democratic	Jim Renwick	9,639	55.79	+5.52
Progressive Conservative	Nola Sam Crewe	4,289	24.83	–1.95
Liberal	Dennis Drainville	2,821	16.33	–4.33
Communist	Gordon Massie	214	1.24	–0.35
Libertarian	Walter Belej	196	1.13	+0.80
Independent	Barry Weisleder	117	0.68	–
Total valid votes		17,276	99.13	
Total rejected ballots		152	0.87	+0.22
Turnout		17,428	56.30	–3.05
Eligible voters		30,954		
New Democratic hold		Swing		+3.74
Source: Elections Ontario

1975 Ontario general election
Party	Candidate	Votes	%	±%
New Democratic	Jim Renwick	9,133	50.27	+1.00
Progressive Conservative	Dick Perdue	4,865	26.78	–11.34
Liberal	Nick Kapelos	3,754	20.66	+9.59
Communist	Ed McDonald	288	1.59	–
Independent	Walter Belej	60	0.33	–
Independent	George Shand	36	0.20	–
Social Credit	Armand Siksna	31	0.17	–1.36
Total valid votes		18,167	99.34	
Total rejected ballots		120	0.66	–0.13
Turnout		18,287	59.35	–5.69
Eligible voters		30,811		
New Democratic hold		Swing		+6.17
Source: Elections Ontario

=== 1966 electoral boundaries ===
1971 Ontario general election
Party	Candidate	Votes	%	±%
New Democratic	Jim Renwick	11,132	49.27	–4.69
Progressive Conservative	J. J. Richards	8,614	38.12	+7.07
Liberal	Gordon W. Potts	2,503	11.08	–2.47
Social Credit	Victoria (Vicki) Andrews	346	1.53	–
Total valid votes		22,595	99.22	
Total rejected ballots		178	0.78	–0.59
Turnout		22,773	65.04	+4.93
Eligible voters		35,012		
New Democratic hold		Swing		–5.88
Source: Elections Ontario

1967 Ontario general election
Party	Candidate	Votes	%	±%
New Democratic	Jim Renwick	10,716	53.96	+15.45
Progressive Conservative	Ying Hope	6,167	31.05	+0.54
Liberal	Joseph Breglia	2,690	13.54	–16.95
Socialist Labor	William Blackwood Hendry	287	1.45	–
Total valid votes		19,860	98.62	
Total rejected ballots		277	1.38	–0.39
Turnout		20,137	60.11	–5.51
Eligible voters		33,500		
New Democratic hold		Swing		+7.45
Source: Elections Ontario

=== Pre-1966 electoral boundaries ===
Ontario provincial by-election, September 10, 1964 Resignation of Robert Macaulay
Party	Candidate	Votes	%	±%
New Democratic	Jim Renwick	7,287	38.51	+15.92
Progressive Conservative	Kenneth Waters	5,774	30.51	–18.93
Liberal	Charles Templeton	5,771	30.50	+4.01
Independent	Frederick Graham	91	0.48	–0.36
Total valid votes		18,923	98.24	
Total rejected ballots		340	1.77	+0.40
Turnout		19,263	65.62	+9.35
Eligible voters		29,357		
New Democratic gain from Progressive Conservative		Swing		+5.96
Source: Elections Ontario

1963 Ontario general election
Party	Candidate	Votes	%	±%
Progressive Conservative	Robert Macaulay	8,047	49.45	–1.80
Liberal	Barry Allen	4,311	26.49	+3.34
New Democratic	Gerry Gallagher	3,676	22.59	–3.01
Independent	Fred Graham	137	0.84	–
Socialist Labor	Alan L. Sanderson	103	0.63	–
Total valid votes		16,274	98.63	
Total rejected ballots		226	1.37	–0.23
Turnout		16,500	56.26	+8.18
Eligible voters		29,327		
Progressive Conservative hold		Swing		–2.57
Source: Elections Ontario

1959 Ontario general election
Party	Candidate	Votes	%	±%
Progressive Conservative	Robert Macaulay	7,814	51.25	+4.11
Co-operative Commonwealth	Edward Theobald	3,903	25.60	–2.07
Liberal	Carl Lewis	3,530	23.15	+0.39
Total valid votes		15,247	98.40	
Total rejected ballots		248	1.60	–0.09
Turnout		15,495	48.09	–5.36
Eligible voters		32,223		
Progressive Conservative hold		Swing		+3.09
Source: Elections Ontario

1955 Ontario general election
Party	Candidate	Votes	%	±%
Progressive Conservative	Robert Macaulay	8,771	47.14	+1.56
Co-operative Commonwealth	Herbert Gargrave	5,148	27.67	–2.75
Liberal	Fred Beavis	4,236	22.76	+0.33
Labor–Progressive	Hector Harold MacArthur	329	1.77	–
Socialist Labor	Alan L. Sanderson	124	0.67	–0.91
Total valid votes		18,608	98.31	
Total rejected ballots		320	1.69	+0.21
Turnout		18,928	53.44	–6.85
Eligible voters		35,417		
Progressive Conservative hold		Swing		+2.16
Source: Elections Ontario

1951 Ontario general election
Party	Candidate	Votes	%	±%
Progressive Conservative	Robert Macaulay	10,736	45.57	+6.28
Co-operative Commonwealth	Carroll Langford Coburn	7,166	30.42	–17.13
Liberal	A. Roy Cadwell	5,285	22.43	+10.21
Socialist Labor	Alan L. Sanderson	371	1.57	+0.64
Total valid votes		23,558	98.52	
Total rejected ballots		353	1.48	+0.53
Turnout		23,911	60.29	–5.03
Eligible voters		39,661		
Progressive Conservative gain from Co-operative Commonwealth		Swing		+11.71
Source: Elections Ontario

1948 Ontario general election
Party	Candidate	Votes	%	±%
Co-operative Commonwealth	Leslie Wismer	12,429	47.55	+14.60
Progressive Conservative	Charles A. Walton	10,270	39.29	–8.24
Liberal	Joseph McNamara	3,195	12.22	–3.98
Socialist Labor	William Blackwood Hendry	245	0.94	–
Total valid votes		26,139	99.05	
Total rejected ballots		250	0.95	+0.04
Turnout		26,389	65.32	–1.38
Eligible voters		40,401		
Co-operative Commonwealth gain from Progressive Conservative		Swing		+11.42
Source: Elections Ontario

1945 Ontario general election
Party	Candidate	Votes	%	±%
Progressive Conservative	Gordon Millen	12,620	47.53	+4.64
Co-operative Commonwealth	Leslie Wismer	8,749	32.95	–11.19
Liberal	William Allen	4,302	16.20	+3.24
Labor–Progressive	Harry Bell	683	2.57	–
Independent (Socialist Labour)	Richard Dunk	197	0.74	–
Total valid votes		26,551	99.09	
Total rejected ballots		244	0.91	+0.35
Turnout		26,795	66.69	+17.76
Eligible voters		40,176		
Progressive Conservative gain from Co-operative Commonwealth		Swing		+7.92
Source: Elections Ontario

1943 Ontario general election
Party	Candidate	Votes	%	±%
Co-operative Commonwealth	Leslie Wismer	7,640	44.15	+25.47
Progressive Conservative	William Summerville	7,422	42.89	–3.34
Liberal	William Allen	2,244	12.97	–21.74
Total valid votes		17,306	99.44	
Total rejected ballots		97	0.56	–0.42
Turnout		17,403	48.93	–17.26
Eligible voters		35,567		
Co-operative Commonwealth gain from Conservative		Swing		+23.61
Source: Elections Ontario

1937 Ontario general election
Party	Candidate	Votes	%	±%
Conservative	William Summerville	11,082	46.23	–0.27
Liberal	Robert Allen	8,321	34.71	–14.19
Co-operative Commonwealth	John W. Buckley	4,477	18.67	–
Labour	Edward Farrell	94	0.39	–4.21
Total valid votes		23,974	99.02	
Total rejected ballots		237	0.98	+0.04
Turnout		24,211	66.19	+2.48
Eligible voters		36,580		
Conservative gain from Liberal		Swing		+6.96
Source: Elections Ontario

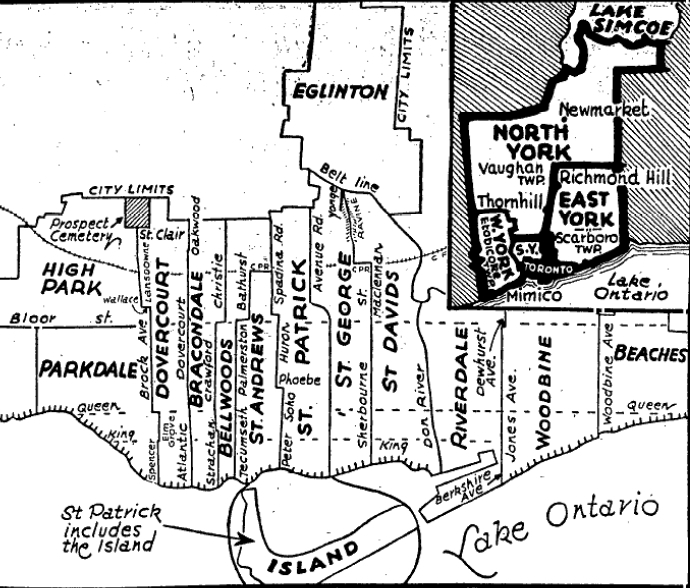
Toronto riding boundaries after 1934 redistribution

1934 Ontario general election
Party	Candidate	Votes	%	±%
Liberal	Robert Allen	10,898	48.90	+21.60
Conservative	George Oakley	10,363	46.50	–26.20
Socialist Labor	Edward Farrell	1,025	4.60	–
Total valid votes		22,286	99.06	
Total rejected ballots		211	0.94	+0.36
Turnout		22,497	63.70	+26.73
Eligible voters		35,316		
Liberal gain from Conservative		Swing		+23.90
Source: Elections Ontario

=== 1926 electoral boundaries ===
Toronto riding boundaries after 1926 redistribution

1929 Ontario general election
Party	Candidate	Votes	%	±%
Conservative	George Oakley	5,604	72.70	+3.58
Liberal	James McLaughlin	2,104	27.30	–3.58
Total valid votes		7,708	99.42	
Total rejected ballots		45	0.58	–0.05
Turnout		7,753	36.98	–24.99
Eligible voters		20,968		
Conservative hold		Swing		+3.58
Source: Elections Ontario

1926 Ontario general election
Party	Candidate	Votes	%	±%
Conservative	George Oakley	8,832	69.12	–9.94
Liberal	A. R. Hassard	3,946	30.88	+18.28
Total valid votes		12,778	99.37	
Total rejected ballots		81	0.63	–1.34
Turnout		12,859	61.96	+26.13
Eligible voters		20,753		
Conservative hold		Swing		–14.11
Source: Elections Ontario

=== 1914 electoral boundaries ===
1923 Ontario general election
Party	Candidate	Votes	%	±%
Conservative	George Oakley	11,074	79.05	+49.40
Liberal	Harold G. Farrell	1,765	12.60	–
Labour	Alexander Lyon	1,169	8.35	–22.18
Total valid votes		14,008	98.03	
Total rejected ballots		281	1.97	+1.97
Turnout		14,289	35.83	–
Eligible voters		39,879		
Conservative gain from Soldier		Swing		+24.70
Source: Elections Ontario

1919 Ontario general election
Party	Candidate	Votes	%	±%
Soldier	Joseph McNamara	7,472	38.84	–
Labour	John Tristam Vick	5,873	30.52	–
Conservative	Williams D. Robbins	5,706	29.66	–39.40
Socialist	George Lockhart	189	0.98	–1.97
Total valid votes		19,240	100.00	
Total rejected ballots		–		
Turnout		19,240	–	–
Eligible voters				
Soldier gain from Conservative		Swing		–
Source: Elections Ontario

1914 Ontario general election
Party	Candidate	Votes	%	±%
Conservative	Joseph Russell	3,299	69.06	–
Temperance	W. W. Hiltz	1,337	27.99	–
Socialist	Thomas David Black	141	2.95	–
Total valid votes		4,777	98.66	
Total rejected ballots		65	1.34	–
Turnout		4,842	61.01	–
Eligible voters		7,936		
Conservative gain from		Swing		+0.00
Source: Elections Ontario

== See also ==
- List of Ontario provincial electoral districts
- Canadian provincial electoral districts
