= John Small (Canadian MP) =

Canadian politician

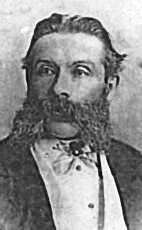

Member of the Canadian Parliament for Toronto East
- In office 1882–1891
- Preceded by: Samuel Platt
- Succeeded by: Emerson Coatsworth

Personal details
- Born: October 8, 1831 York Township, Upper Canada
- Died: February 10, 1909 (aged 77)
- Party: Conservative

John Small (October 8, 1831 – February 10, 1909) was a Canadian politician.

Born in York Township, Upper Canada, Small was educated in his home district schools and at the Upper Canada College.

Both Small's grandfather, also named John Small, and his father Charles Coxwell Small had been the Chief Clerk of Upper Canada's Privy Council.

In 1855 he was elected to the Parliament of the Province of Canada for East Toronto Riding.

From 1855 to 1882, he was a taxing officer of the Court of the Queen's Bench. From 1878 to 1879, he was a member of the Toronto City Council. He was elected to the House of Commons of Canada for Toronto East in the 1882 federal election. A Conservative, he was re-elected in 1887. He did not run in 1891 and was appointed collector of customs in Toronto.
