= Robert Macaulay =

Canadian politician

Robert William Macaulay

Ontario MPP
- In office 1951–1964
- Preceded by: Leslie Wismer
- Succeeded by: Jim Renwick
- Constituency: Riverdale

Personal details
- Born: May 25, 1921 Toronto, Ontario
- Died: August 17, 2010 (aged 89) Toronto, Ontario
- Party: Progressive Conservative
- Spouse: Joy Wecker
- Relations: Leopold Macaulay, father
- Children: 2
- Profession: Lawyer
- Portfolio: Minister without portfolio, 1958-1959

Military service
- Allegiance: Canadian
- Branch/service: 48th Highlanders
- Years of service: 1940-1945

Robert William Macaulay (May 25, 1921 – August 17, 2010) was a Canadian politician.

== Background ==
Macaulay was born in Toronto in 1921 to Hazel and Leopold Macaulay. His father served as an MPP and a cabinet minister in the government of George Henry in the 1930s. He attended Upper Canada College before enlisting in the army during World War II where he served with the 48th Highlanders. After the war, he studied at the University of Toronto and graduated with a degree in law from Osgoode Hall. He was called to the bar in 1948 and worked in the field for over 50 years. He and his wife Joy raised two children.

== Politics ==
Macaulay was elected to the Legislative Assembly of Ontario as the Progressive Conservative Member of Provincial Parliament (MPP) for the Toronto riding of Riverdale in the 1951 Ontario election. He was re-elected three times and served for 13 years.

In 1958, Premier of Ontario Leslie Frost appointed him to the cabinet as minister without portfolio with responsibilities in the Treasury Board. He was also appointed as a vice-chairman of Ontario Hydro. In 1959, he was promoted to the new position of Minister of Energy Resources.

When Frost retired, Macaulay ran to succeed him in the 1961 Progressive Conservative leadership convention finishing third on the fifth ballot. The victor, John Robarts, made Macaulay his Minister of Economics and Development. Macaulay retained his seat in the 1963 Ontario election, but he resigned from cabinet shortly afterwards citing health reasons. He remained in the legislature until May 1964 when he resigned his seat and returned to private life.

=== Cabinet positions ===
Robarts ministry, Province of Ontario (1961–1971)
Cabinet posts (2)
Predecessor	Office	Successor
Ray Connell	Minister of Economics and Development; 1961-1963	James Allan
New position	Minister of Energy Resources; 1959-1963	John Simonett
