= Samuel Platt =

Canadian politician

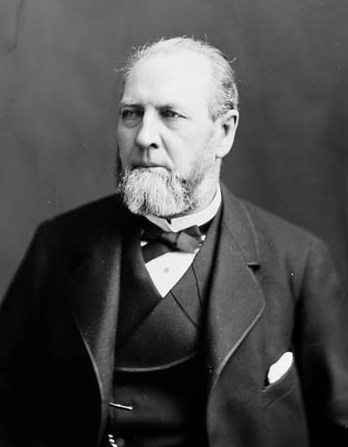

Member of the Canadian Parliament for Toronto East
- In office 1875–1882
- Preceded by: John O'Donohoe
- Succeeded by: John Small

Personal details
- Born: 1812 Armagh, Ireland
- Died: May 5, 1887 (aged 74–75) Toronto, Ontario
- Party: Independent

Samuel Platt (1812 – May 5, 1887) was a Canadian brewer and politician. He was born in Ireland in 1812 and immigrated to Canada in 1827.

He worked as a clerk at Enoch Turner's brewery for four years and then erected a distillery of his own at Berkeley and Front Streets.

Platt married a Miss Lockett in 1836.

He served as a councillor for St. Lawrence Ward from 1845 to 1851, followed by a two-year term as an alderman for St. David's Ward in 1853 and 1854.

In 1872, Platt was one of four citizens appointed to the Water Commission, which supervised the construction of the city's waterworks before disbanding in 1877.

He was elected as an Independent to represent the federal riding of Toronto East in 1875 and 1878.

Platt also served as a director of the Consumers Gas Company.
