= Robert Allen (Ontario politician) =

Canadian businessman and politician

Ontario MPP
- In office 1934–1937
- Preceded by: George Oakley
- Succeeded by: William Summerville
- Constituency: Riverdale

Personal details
- Born: April 21, 1888; England
- Died: August 21, 1969 (aged 81); Toronto, Ontario
- Political party: Liberal
- Spouse: Julien McDonnell (m. 1919-1951)
- Children: 2
- Occupation: Businessman

Robert Aloysius Allen (April 21, 1888 – August 21, 1969) was a Canadian businessman and politician in Ontario. He was a Liberal member in the Legislative Assembly of Ontario from 1934 to 1937 who represented the downtown Toronto riding of Riverdale.

== Background ==
The son of William Allen and Mary Badger, he came to Canada in 1904. In 1919, Allen married Julien McDonnell, the daughter of Randall McDonnell. Together, they raised two sons. His elder son, William, later served as Metro Toronto Chairman. Allen was president of Allen Drugs Ltd.

== Politics ==
Allen served on Toronto city council from 1927 to 1930, and in 1933. He ran unsuccessfully for the Toronto East seat in the Canadian House of Commons in 1930 as a Liberal, losing to Conservative Edmond Baird Ryckman.

In the 1934 provincial election, he ran as the Liberal candidate in the riding of Riverdale. He defeated incumbent Conservative candidate George Oakley by 535 votes. He served as a backbench supporter of Premier Mitchell Hepburn. In the 1937 election, he was defeated by Conservative candidate William Summerville by 2,761 votes.
