= Toronto East (federal electoral district) =

Former federal electoral district in Ontario, Canada

Ontario electoral district
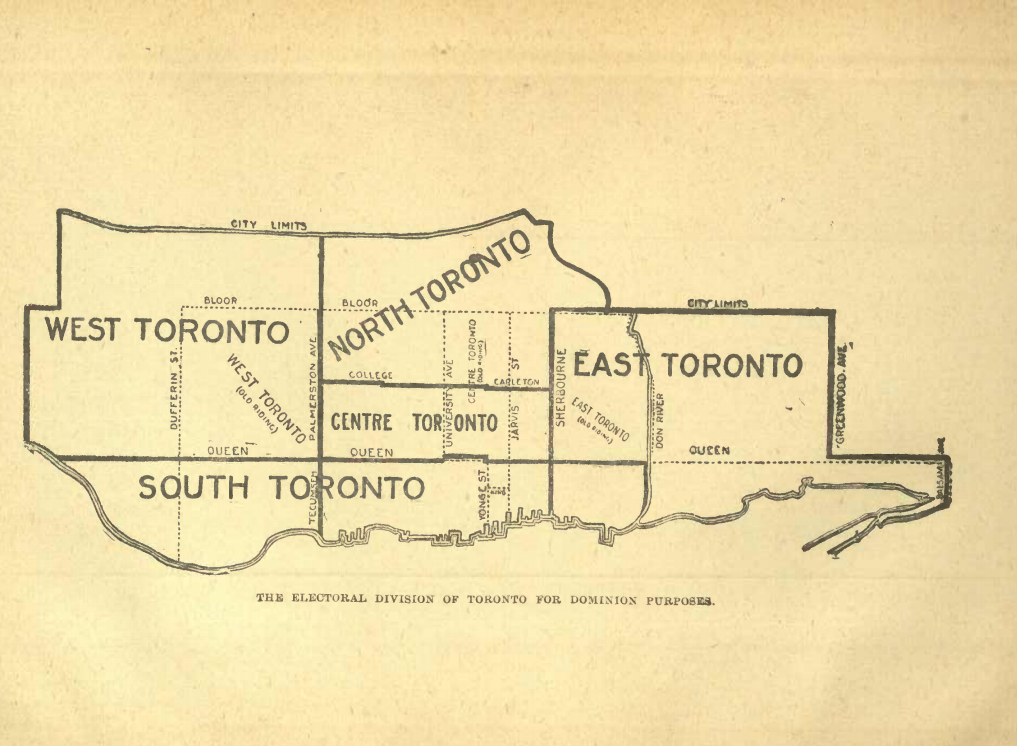
- Toronto East riding, in 1904

Defunct federal electoral district
- Legislature: House of Commons
- District created: 1867
- District abolished: 1933
- First contested: 1867
- Last contested: 1934

Toronto East (called East Toronto until 1903) was a federal electoral district represented in the House of Commons of Canada from 1867 to 1935. It was located in the city of Toronto in the province of Ontario. It was created by the British North America Act 1867.

East Toronto initially consisted of St. Lawrence, St. Davids and St. James Wards of the city of Toronto. In 1872, St. James Ward was excluded from the riding. After 1903, the boundaries varied, but generally included the part of the city east of Sherbourne Street.

The electoral district was abolished in 1933 when it was redistributed between Broadview and Greenwood ridings.

== Boundaries ==
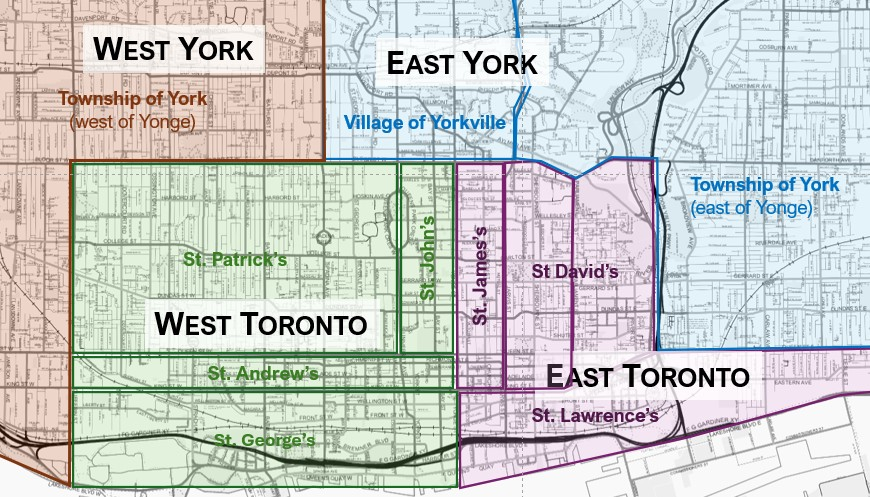
1860-1872

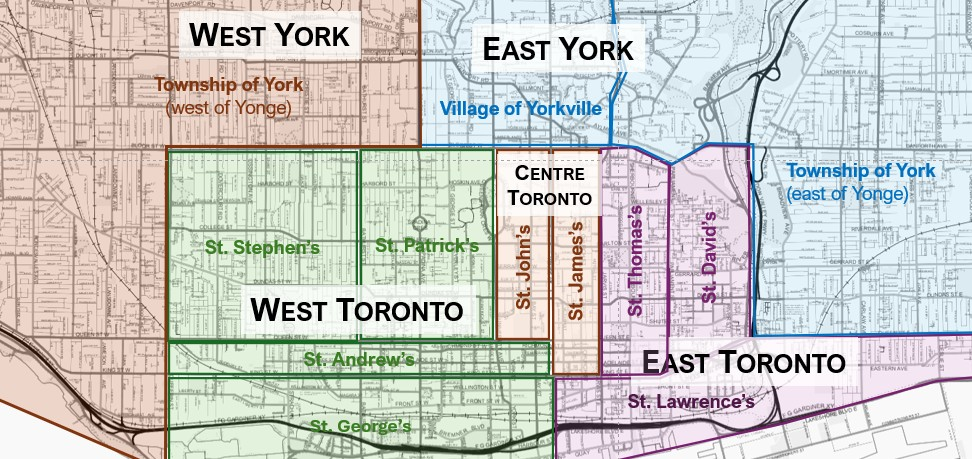
1872-1904

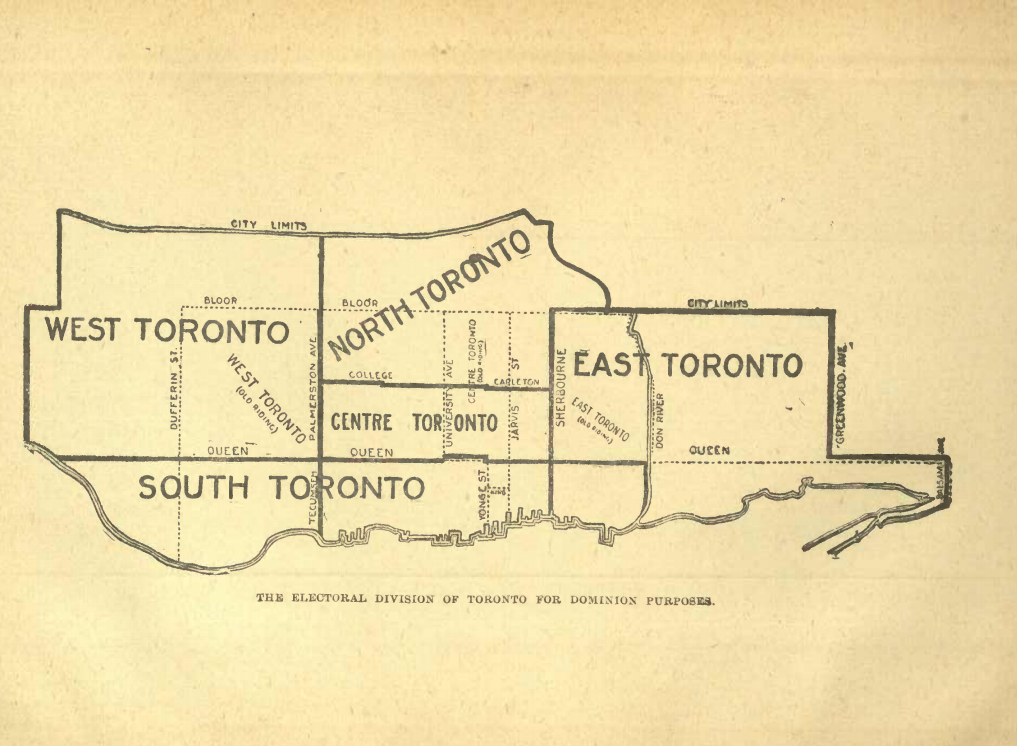
1904–1917

== Members of Parliament ==
This riding has elected the following members of Parliament:

Parliament	Years	Member	Party
East Toronto
1st	1867–1872	James Beaty Sr.	Conservative
2nd	1872–1874	James Beaty Sr.	Conservative
3rd	1874–1875	John O'Donohoe	Liberal
3rd	1875–1878	Samuel Platt	Independent
4th	1878–1882	Samuel Platt	Independent
5th	1882–1887	John Small	Conservative
6th	1887–1891	John Small	Conservative
7th	1891–1896	Emerson Coatsworth	Conservative
8th	1896–1900	John Ross Robertson	Independent Conservative
9th	1900–1904	Albert Edward Kemp	Conservative
Toronto East
10th	1904–1908	Albert Edward Kemp	Conservative
11th	1908–1911	Joseph Russell	Independent
12th	1911–1916	Albert Edward Kemp	Conservative
12th	1916–1917	Albert Edward Kemp	Conservative
13th	1917–1921	Albert Edward Kemp	Government (Unionist)
14th	1921–1925	Edmond Baird Ryckman	Conservative
15th	1925–1926	Edmond Baird Ryckman	Conservative
16th	1926–1930	Edmond Baird Ryckman	Conservative
17th	1930–1930	Edmond Baird Ryckman	Conservative
17th	1930–1934†	Edmond Baird Ryckman	Conservative
17th	1934–1935	Thomas Langton Church	Conservative
Riding dissolved into Broadview and Greenwood

== Election history ==
=== East Toronto ===
1867 Canadian federal election
Party	Candidate	Votes	%	±%
Conservative	James Beaty	1,113		
Liberal	William Thomas Aikins	980		
Unknown	Mr. Allen	1		

1872 Canadian federal election
Party	Candidate	Votes	%	±%
Conservative	James Beaty, Sr.	872		
Liberal	John O'Donohoe	775		
Source: Canadian Elections Database

1874 Canadian federal election
Party	Candidate	Votes	%	±%
Liberal	John O'Donohoe	1,289		
Liberal-Conservative	Emerson B. Coatsworth	1,152		
Source: Canadian Elections Database; Party affiliation per news reporting of the day

By-election: On Election being declared void, 18 January 1875: East Toronto
Party	Candidate	Votes	%	±%
Independent	Samuel Platt	1,396		
Unknown	John O'Donohoe	982		

1878 Canadian federal election
Party	Candidate	Votes	%	±%
Independent	Samuel Platt	1,743		
Unknown	Ed Galley	1,052		

1882 Canadian federal election
Party	Candidate	Votes	%	±%
Conservative	John Small	1,922		
Unknown	Thomas Thompson	1,496		

1887 Canadian federal election
Party	Candidate	Votes	%	±%
Conservative	John Small	2,858		
Liberal	Alfred Young	1,603		
Independent	Ernest A. Macdonald	164		

1891 Canadian federal election
Party	Candidate	Votes	%	±%
Conservative	Emerson Coatsworth	3,520		
Liberal	Alex E. Wheeler	2,056		

1896 Canadian federal election
Party	Candidate	Votes	%	±%
Independent Conservative	John Ross Robertson	4,631		
Conservative	Emerson Coatsworth	3,012		

1900 Canadian federal election
Party	Candidate	Votes	%	±%
Conservative	Albert E. Kemp	4,074		
Liberal	George Anderson	2,830		
Labour	Andrew McFarren	93		

=== Toronto East ===
1904 Canadian federal election
Party	Candidate	Votes	%	±%
Conservative	Albert Edward Kemp	4,125		
Liberal	John Knox Leslie	1,993		

1908 Canadian federal election
Party	Candidate	Votes	%	±%
Independent	Joseph Russell	4,039		
Conservative	Albert Edward Kemp	3,246		

1911 Canadian federal election
Party	Candidate	Votes	%	±%
Conservative	Albert Edward Kemp	7,082		
Independent	Joseph Russell	2,281		
Liberal	James Pearson	1,878		
Labour	James Richards	463		

By-election: On Mr. Kemp being appointed Minister of Militia and Defence, 14 December 1916: Toronto East
Party	Candidate	Votes	%	±%
Conservative	Albert Edward Kemp	acclaimed		

1917 Canadian federal election
Party	Candidate	Votes	%	±%
Government	Albert Edward Kemp	15,894		
Opposition	John Tristam Vick	4,399		

1921 Canadian federal election
Party	Candidate	Votes	%	±%
Conservative	Edmond Baird Ryckman	5,392		
Progressive	Walter Leigh Rayfield	3,984		
Independent	Thomas Foster	3,680		
Labour	John William Bruce	1,822		
Liberal	Elizabeth Bethune Kiely	52		

1925 Canadian federal election
Party	Candidate	Votes	%	±%
Conservative	Edmond Baird Ryckman	17,663		
Liberal	Gerald Farrell	4,036		

1926 Canadian federal election
Party	Candidate	Votes	%	±%
Conservative	Edmond Baird Ryckman	13,789		
Liberal	Kathleen Bennett	3,299		

1930 Canadian federal election
Party	Candidate	Votes	%	±%
Conservative	Edmond Baird Ryckman	13,423		
Liberal	Robert A. Allen	6,348		

By-election: On Mr. Ryckman being appointed Minister of National Revenue, 25 August 1930: Toronto East
Party	Candidate	Votes	%	±%
Conservative	Edmond Baird Ryckman	acclaimed		

By-election: On Mr. Ryckman's death, 24 September 1934: Toronto East
Party	Candidate	Votes	%	±%
Conservative	Thomas Langton Church	13,227		
Liberal	Harold Proctor Snelgrove	10,721		
Co-operative Commonwealth	Graham Spry	4,649		

== See also ==
- List of Canadian electoral districts
- Historical federal electoral districts of Canada
