= Emerson Coatsworth =

Canadian politician (1854–1943)

Emerson Coatsworth KC
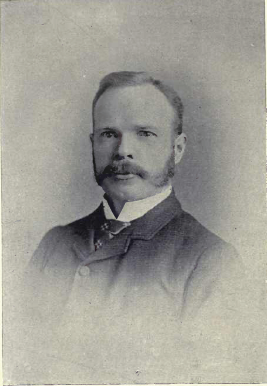

33rd Mayor of Toronto
- In office 1906–1907
- Preceded by: Thomas Urquhart
- Succeeded by: Joseph Oliver

Member of the Canadian Parliament for Toronto East
- In office 1891–1896
- Preceded by: John Small
- Succeeded by: John Ross Robertson

Personal details
- Born: March 9, 1854 Toronto, Canada West
- Died: May 11, 1943 (aged 89) Toronto
- Party: Conservative

Emerson Coatsworth Jr., KC (March 9, 1854 – May 11, 1943) was a Canadian lawyer and politician. He was also a member of the Orange Order in Canada.

Born in Toronto, Coatsworth was educated at the public schools, and studied privately for matriculation into the Law Society. Afterwards he attended Osgoode Hall Law School and graduated in law in University of Toronto in 1886. A practicing lawyer, he was elected to the House of Commons of Canada for the riding of Toronto East in the 1891 federal election. A Conservative, he was defeated in the 1896 election by Independent Conservative John Ross Robertson. In 1904, he was elected an alderman for the Toronto City Council. From 1906 to 1907, he was the 33rd Mayor of Toronto.
