= Walnut Hall =

Building in Toronto, Canada

Coordinates: 43.655691°N 79.373099°W

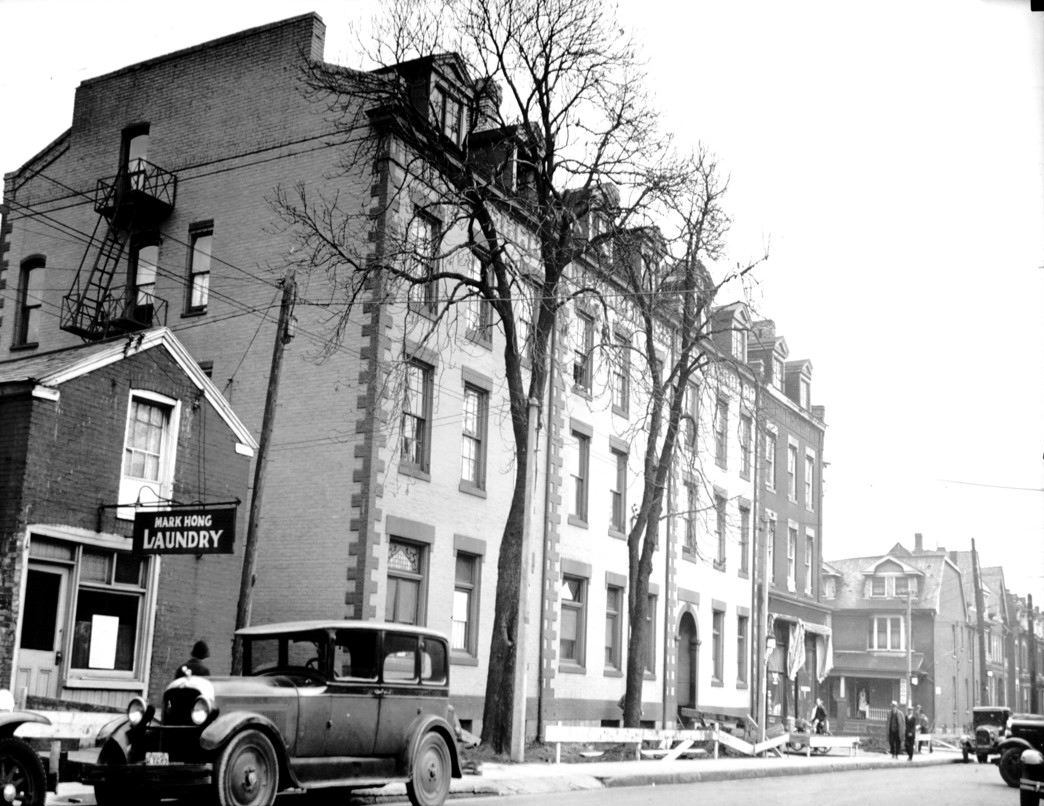
- Walnut Hall in 1934
- Former names: O'Donohoe Row

General information
- Type: Residential
- Architectural style: Georgian
- Location: Shuter Street, Toronto, Ontario, Canada
- Completed: 1856
- Demolished: May 19, 2007
- Owner: Trisan Realty Corp (at demolition)

Technical details
- Floor count: 3.5

Design and construction
- Architect: John Tully

Ontario Heritage Act
- Designated: 1997
- Delisted: 2007

Walnut Hall was a row of four Georgian-style terraced homes in Toronto, Ontario, Canada. Constructed in 1856, it was recognized by both the Government of Canada and the City of Toronto as being of historic significance, but portions of it collapsed and it had to be demolished in 2007 due to neglect. At the time of its demolition, it was Toronto's last remaining complete row of 19th century Georgian townhomes.

== O'Donohoe Row ==
John O'Donohoe, a local politician, auctioneer and land speculator, purchased a lot on Shuter Street in Toronto in 1853. A four-unit terrace, known as O'Donohoe Row, was designed by architect John Tully and completed on the lot in 1856. At three and half storeys, the building featured buff brick with decorative brickwork and stone detailing, a symmetrical façade, a gabled roof and dormer windows.

At the time, Shuter Street was located in a prestigious residential neighbourhood. Given its location and the quality of its construction, O'Donohoe Row was intended to cater to the affluent middle class, and was representative of the Georgian-style brick row houses which flourished in Toronto in the 1850s.

The character of the neighbourhood changed, and the building was renamed Walnut Hall Apartment House in 1903. In 1949, the interior was converted to a rooming house, and a number of changes were made to the exterior, including the conversion of the southeast corner to a storefront.

The Royal Canadian Mounted Police purchased the building in the 1970s, as part of a land assembly for a new Ontario Division headquarters building. In 1983, the Government of Canada designated it as a Recognized Federal Heritage Building. It was also during the 1980s that Walnut Hall was vacated, left unheated and boarded up. The building was sold to a private developer in 1996. Once it was privately owned, the City designated Walnut Hall under the Ontario Heritage Act in 1997.

== Demolition ==
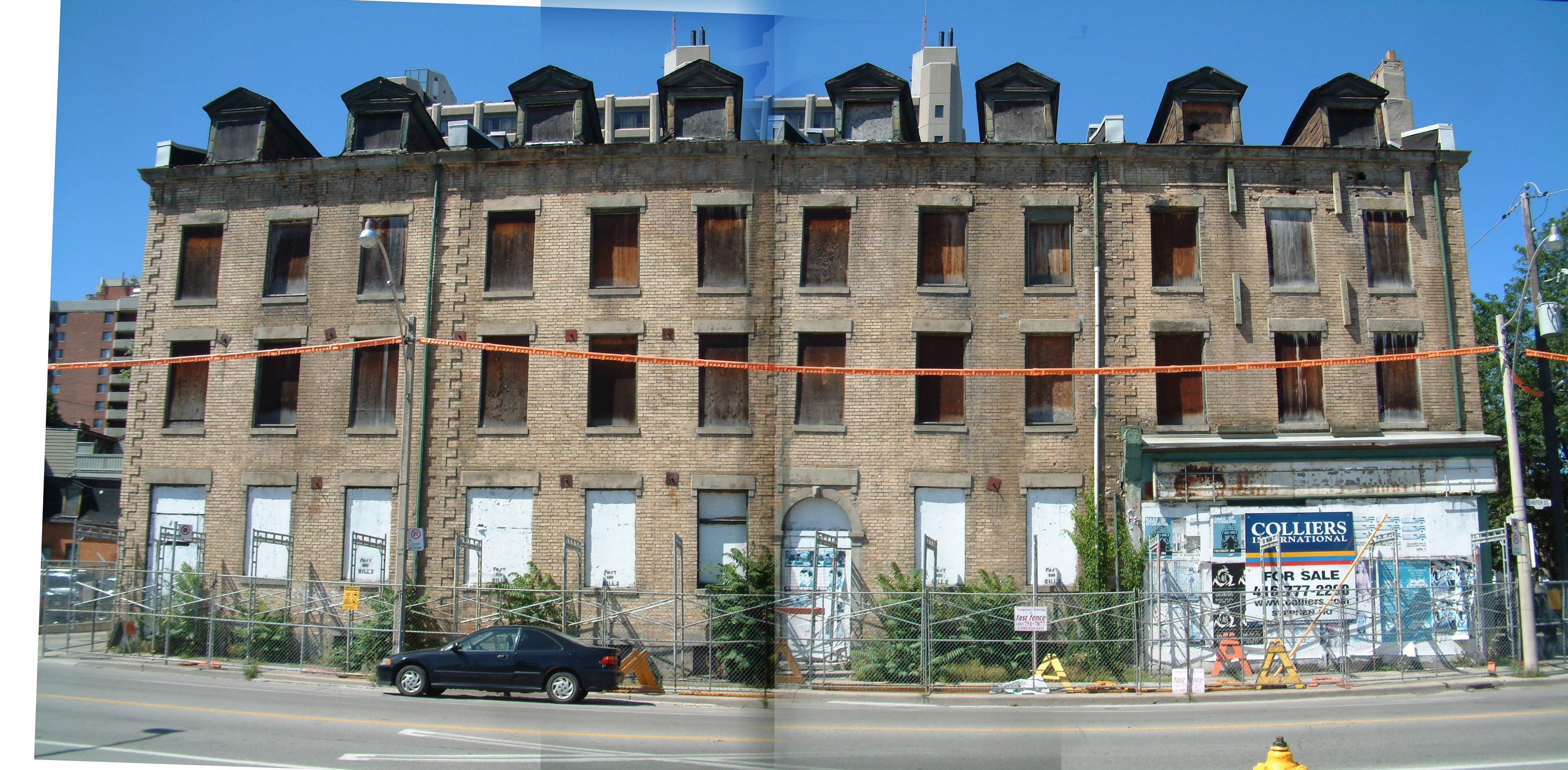
Walnut Hall in 2006

Walnut Hall was the subject of a number of demolition proposals and redevelopment schemes from the 1970s onwards, ranging from a proposed parking lot to residential developments that would have incorporated the heritage building. None of the proposals was achieved, however, and Walnut Hall remained vacant and unheated. In 1999, the City of Toronto issued an order to the landowner to correct a number of growing structural deficiencies in the building.

In 2004, Walnut Hall appeared in the film Cinderella Man when the derelict building was used to portray a 1930s New York City-streetscape.

In March 2007, Trisan Realty Corp. purchased the property with the intention of restoring Walnut Hall. On May 19, 2007, however, police and fire officials were called to the site when pedestrians noticed bricks falling from the second and third storeys. By the end of the afternoon, parts of the rear walls had begun to cave in. That evening, a city building inspector recommended that Walnut Hall be demolished for safety reasons, and the demolition was undertaken that night.

In 2008, Heritage Canada included Walnut Hall in its annual list of "Worst Losses", referring to the building's neglect and demolition as "a case of architectural euthanasia". Michael McClelland, a heritage architect and a founding member of the Canadian Association of Professional Heritage Consultants, described the loss of Walnut Hall as being emblematic of a "broken" heritage preservation system in Toronto.
