= Joseph Russell (Canadian politician) =

Canadian politician

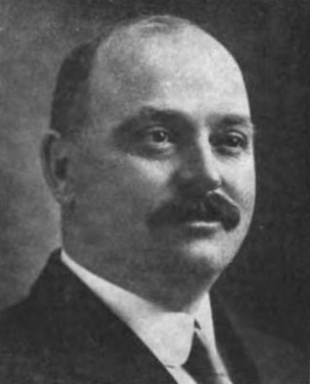

Ontario MPP
- In office 1914–1919
- Preceded by: New riding
- Succeeded by: Joseph McNamara
- Constituency: Riverdale

Member of Parliament for Toronto East
- In office 1908–1911
- Preceded by: Albert Edward Kemp
- Succeeded by: Albert Edward Kemp

Personal details
- Born: 1 October 1868 Toronto, Ontario
- Died: 14 December 1925 (aged 57) Toronto, Ontario
- Party: Independent, 1908-1911; Conservative, 1914-1919
- Occupation: Businessman

Joseph Russell (1 October 1868 – 14 December 1925) was a Toronto businessman and politician.

The eldest son of John Russell, who was a brick maker and stone cutter, Joseph Russell was a brick manufacturer owning the brickworks at 1308 Queen Street East at Alton Avenue. He provided much of the supplies used in the original construction of the Toronto Railway Company's paintshop in 1913 and it is thought the Toronto Transit Commission's Russell Carhouse may be named after him.

Russell was a candidate for the Ontario legislature in 1908 but was unsuccessful. He was then nominated as an Independent candidate against incumbent Conservative MP Albert Edward Kemp in Toronto East. Kemp's opponents accused him of neglecting constituents as well as hiring foreign workers at poor pay at the expense of Canadian workers. Russell, by contrast, was a brick manufacturer and was praised for offering rates of pay that allowed workers to "live in houses of their own, and not herd a dozen into a room." Russell defeated Kemp by almost 800 votes in a two man contest in the 1908 federal election. Kemp poured his efforts into rebuilding the Conservative Party and defeated Russell three years later in the 1911 election.

He returned to provincial politics and won a seat in the 1914 provincial election. Russell served as the Conservative member for Riverdale from 1914 until 1919.
