= Joseph McNamara (Ontario politician) =

Canadian politician

Ontario MPP
- In office 1919–1923
- Preceded by: Joseph Russell
- Succeeded by: George Oakley
- Constituency: Riverdale

Personal details
- Born: June 19, 1888; Preston, England
- Died: July 14, 1957 (aged 69)
- Political party: Soldier Party
- Occupation: Police officer

Joseph McNamara (June 18, 1888 – July 14, 1957) was an Ontario political figure. He represented Riverdale in the Legislative Assembly of Ontario from 1919 to 1923 as the only member of the Soldier Party and supported the United Farmers of Ontario-Independent Labour Party government of E.C. Drury that took office following the election. However, McNamara remained independent and, in 1921, made an alliance with M.M. MacBride, a dissenting member of the Independent Labour Party who had left the governing caucus, to move a Bill which would have introduced an eight-hour day. This was seen as an attempt to embarrass the rest of the ILP who opposed the measure in deference to the farmer base of the United Farmers who saw it as a threat to their ability to afford farm workers.

McNamara did not run for re-election in 1923. A quarter-century later, he attempted to return to politics by contesting Riverdale in the 1948 provincial election as a Liberal but placed third behind the Co-operative Commonwealth Federation and Progressive Conservative candidates.

McNamara was born in Preston, England, the son of Thomas McNamara, and came to Canada in 1902. He served as a member of the Royal North-West Mounted Police from 1914 to 1915, and prior to this had served four years in the United States Artillery in Wyoming. On September 24, 1915, McNamara enlisted with the 38th Battery, CFA in Regina, Saskatchewan, serving as a sergeant-major. He lost his right arm due to a shell explosion at Vimy on March 28, 1918.
