= Soldier (party) =

During and following the First World War, several people ran in Canadian elections as soldiers. They had themselves listed on the ballot as Soldier Party, "Soldier-Farmer Party", "Soldier-Labour Party", or “Independent Soldier”.

One such candidate, Joseph McNamara, was elected in the riding of Riverdale (in Toronto) in the 1919 Ontario election. His mandate lasted from October 20, 1919 to May 10, 1923 and he generally supported the United Farmers of Ontario-Independent Labour Party government of Ernest C. Drury in the legislature.

Politics in the interwar period were hugely influenced by the societal impacts of veterans, in Canada as in other countries that were participants from the start in that war.

== See also ==
- Veterans Coalition Party of Canada, founded 2019
