= John Ross Robertson =

Canadian newspaper publisher, politician, and philanthropist (1841–1918)

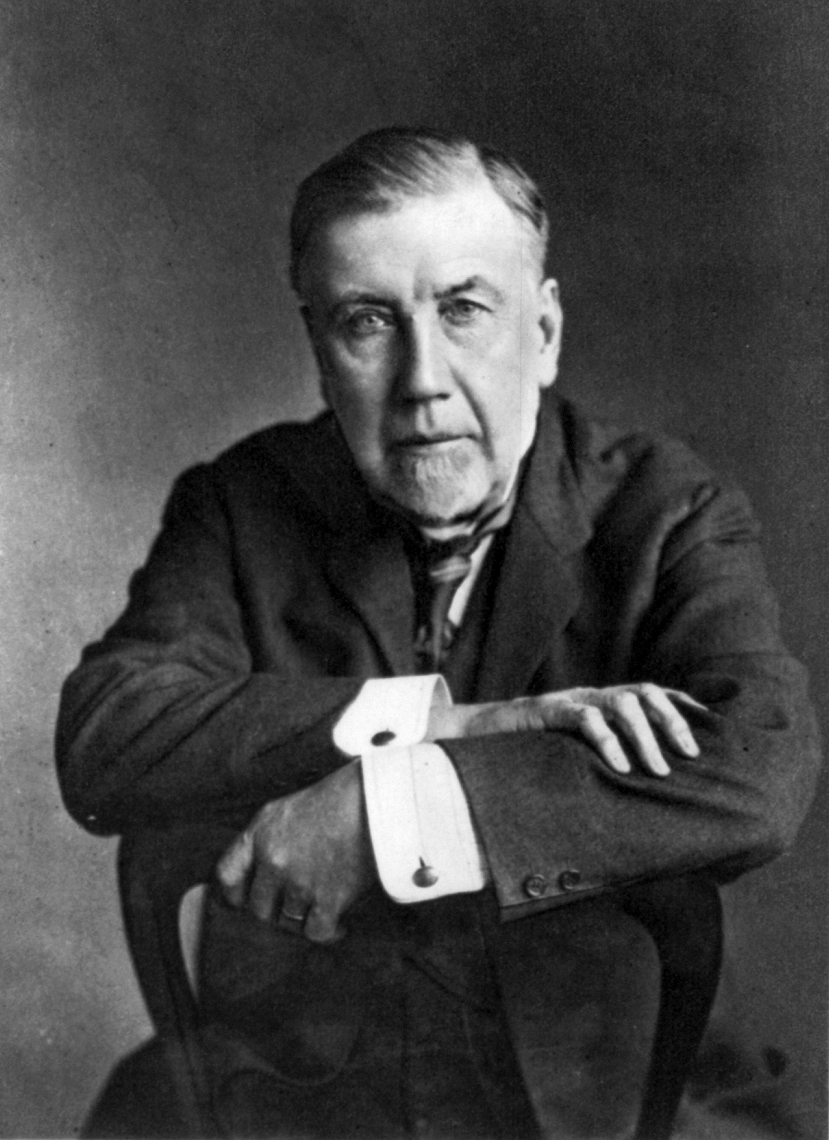

Member of the Canadian Parliament for Toronto East
- In office 1896–1900
- Preceded by: Emerson Coatsworth
- Succeeded by: Albert Edward Kemp

Personal details
- Born: December 28, 1841 Toronto, Canada West
- Died: May 31, 1918 (aged 76) Toronto, Ontario
- Party: Independent Conservative

John Ross Robertson (December 28, 1841 – May 31, 1918) was a Canadian newspaper publisher, politician, and philanthropist in Toronto, Ontario.

== Career ==
Born in 1841, in Toronto, the son of John Robertson, a Scottish wholesale merchant, and Margaret Sinclair, Robertson was educated at Upper Canada College, a private high school in Toronto. As a young man, he started a newspaper at UCC called Young Canada and a satirical weekly magazine, The Grumbler, published in 1864.

He was hired as a reporter and then city editor at The Globe in Toronto, but left The Globe to found The Toronto Daily Telegraph in 1866. That paper lasted five years, and Robertson went to England as a reporter for The Globe. He returned to Toronto in 1876 and convinced his friend and former colleague, Goldwin Smith, to loan him $10,000 to enable him to launch the Toronto Evening Telegram. In the Toronto Evening Telegram he wrote a recurring column on Toronto landmarks. The Evening Telegram was a success from the start and Robertson was soon a wealthy man. Eventually these columns were published in a book called Robertson's Landmarks of Toronto which consists of six volumes.

He was elected to the House of Commons of Canada for the electoral district of Toronto East in the 1896 federal election defeating the incumbent Conservative MP, Emerson Coatsworth. An Independent Conservative, he did not run for re-election in 1900.

== Sports ==
The world of sports was also a focus for Robertson’s public-spiritedness. A fervent advocate of amateur sport, he served as president of the Ontario Hockey Association (OHA) from 1899 to 1905, which was a critical time period in the history of the sport. His battle to protect hockey from the influence of professionalism caused him to be called the "father of Amateur Hockey in Ontario." During his term as president, the OHA was able to set rules defining professionalism in hockey. He worked especially hard to rid hockey of increasing violence both on and off the ice. Robertson donated three similarly named trophies to the OHA for its annual playoffs champions, which included the first J. Ross Robertson Cup for the senior division, the second J. Ross Robertson Cup for the intermediate division, and the third J. Ross Robertson Cup for the junior division. His donation of silver trophies to hockey, cricket, and bowling further encouraged amateur competition. He was inducted into the Hockey Hall of Fame in 1947.

== Personal life ==
In 1881, Robertson’s daughter Helen and niece Gracie died of scarlet fever on the same day.

In 1883, Robertson, at his own expense, build The Lakeside Home for Little Children, on Toronto Islands.

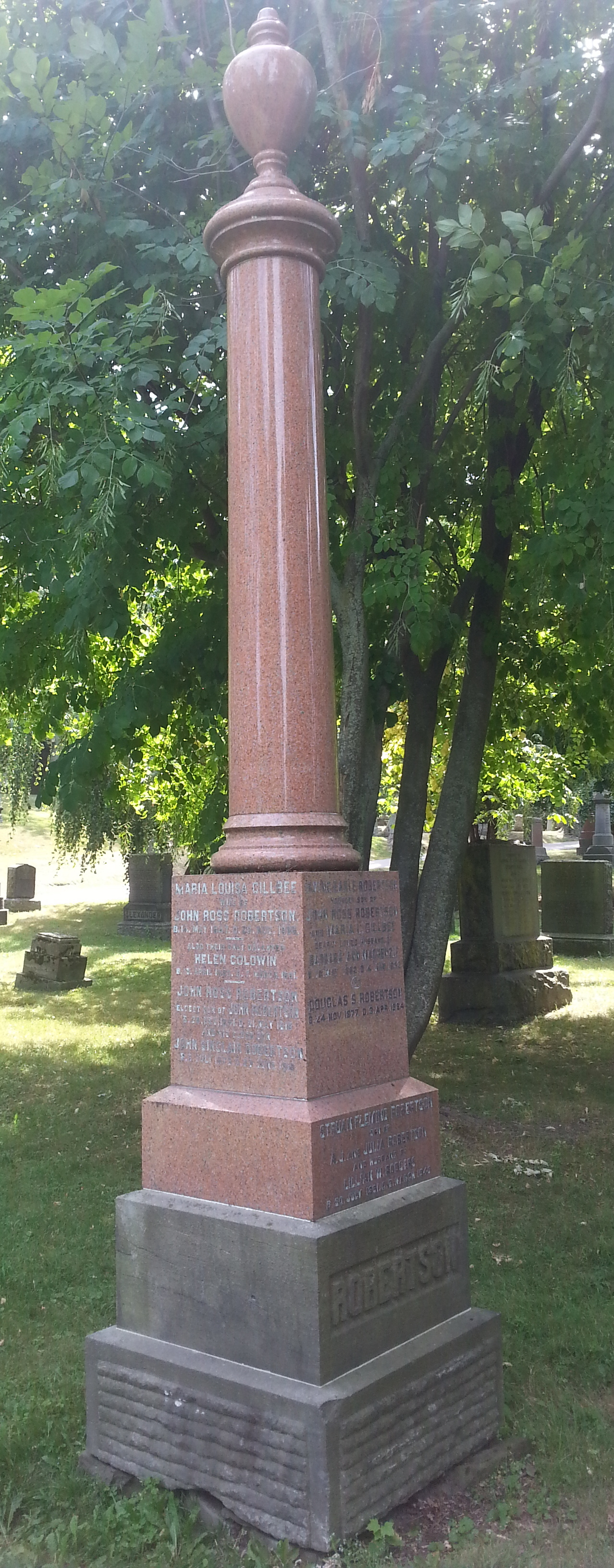
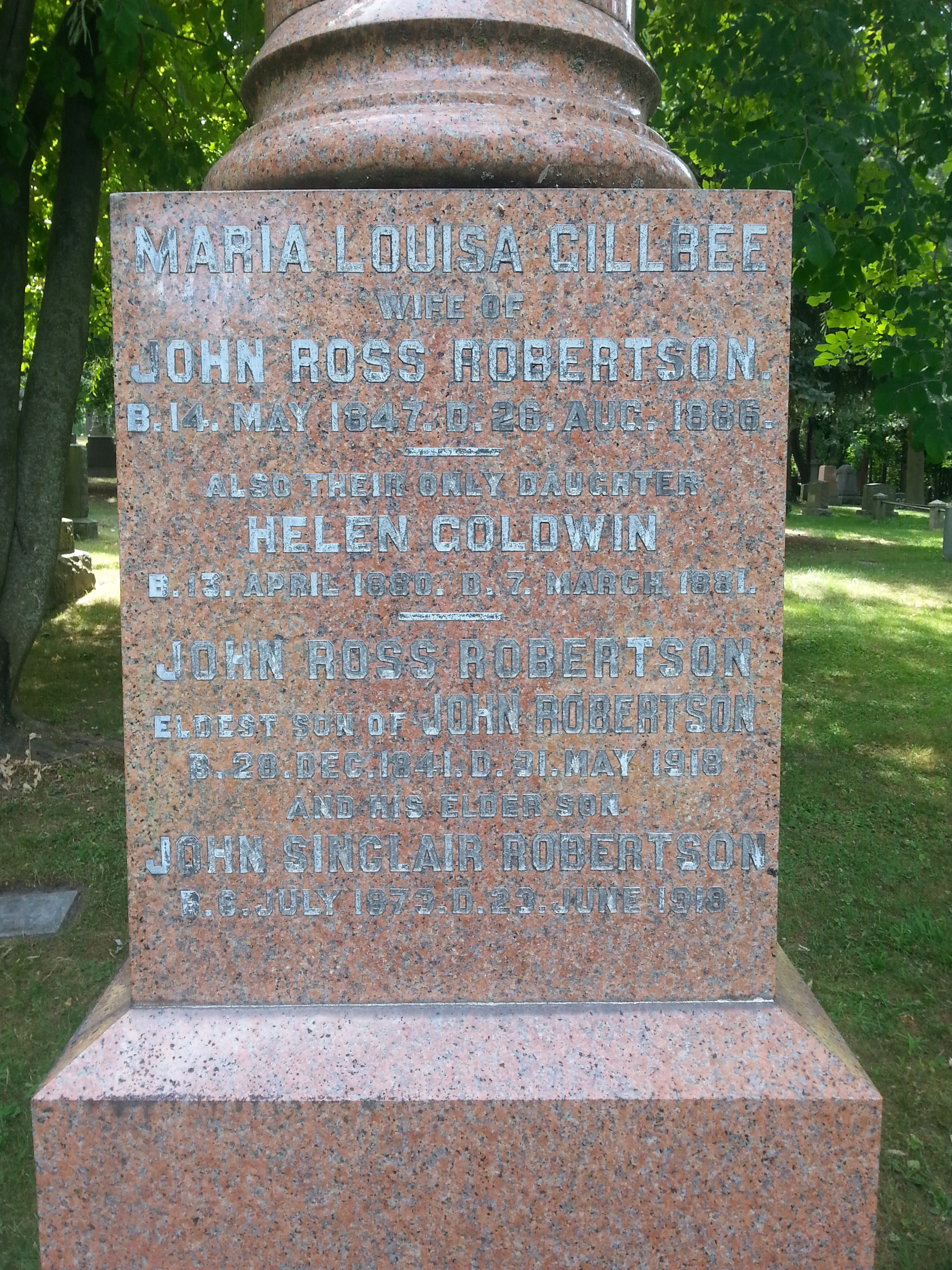
Robertson family grave stone at Toronto Necropolis

Robertson joined the masonic order in 1867 and was elected Grand Master of the Grand Lodge of Canada in the Province of Ontario in 1890. In 1902, Robertson was appointed Grand Junior Warden of England.

In 1889, he became president of the inaugural Canadian Copyright Association.

In 1916, Robertson turned down offers by Prime Minister Borden of both a seat in the Senate of Canada and a knighthood.

Robertson bequeathed his book collection to the Toronto Public Library and left an annuity to the Toronto Hospital for Sick Children. The John Ross Robertson Public School, an elementary school of the Toronto District School Board is named after Robertson.
