= Leslie Wismer =

Canadian trade unionist

Ontario MPP
- In office 1948–1951
- Preceded by: Gordon Millen
- Succeeded by: Robert Macaulay
- Constituency: Riverdale
- In office 1943–1945
- Preceded by: William Summerville
- Succeeded by: Gordon Millen
- Constituency: Riverdale

Personal details
- Born: February 21, 1909 Lincoln County, Ontario
- Died: July 8, 1978 (aged 69) Winchester, Ontario
- Party: Co-operative Commonwealth Federation
- Profession: Trade unionist

Leslie Emery Wismer (February 21, 1909 – July 8, 1978) was a trade union official and a member of the Ontario legislature representing Riverdale for the Co-operative Commonwealth Federation (CCF) from 1943 to 1945 and again from 1948 until 1951.

== Background ==
Wismer was born in Louth Township of Lincoln County, Ontario to parents of Dutch and German descent. He went to the University of Toronto. He began his career selling bonds and also served as editor of the Monetary Times. During World War II, Wismer served as an officer in the Royal Canadian Air Force with the rank of flight lieutenant. He flew as a navigator on Lancaster bombers and later served as a flight instructor at Malton airport. In 1946, he was hired by Kalmen Kaplansky to lead the Joint Labour Committee whose goal was to combat racial intolerance in the workplace. He also served as the public relations director of the Canadian Congress of Labour.

Wismer married Margaret Rutherford.

== Politics ==
He was elected to the legislature in the 1943 provincial election by defeating incumbent Conservative MPP William Summerville but was defeated in 1948 by Gordon Millen. Wismer was again elected for a second, and final, term in 1948. During his first term he acted as the party's financial critic.

In 1951, Wismer took exception to a $6,000 grant to the Art Gallery of Toronto for the purchase of two busts by Picasso and Matisse. He appraised the busts as showing "just how hideous some things can be." He also said that such art could be interpreted as a set of symbols that lead one to believe that "our Christian civilization is disappearing." He went further to say that he didn't want the legislature to decide on the aesthetic value of art but just to find out what the gallery paid for these two pieces before granting the money. Wismer's stand was criticized by Labor-Progressive (Communist) MPP Joseph Salsberg who proclaimed "it will be a sorry day when politicians assume the role of arbiters in art." The house voted to allow the grant.

At the end of his second term he decided not to run again. He said that his work responsibilities with the Canadian Labour Congress did not leave him enough time to devote to legislature and riding activities.

== Later life ==
After leaving the legislature following the 1951 election, Wismer moved to Ottawa, Ontario where he served as president of the Ottawa Trades and Labour Council, president of Mooretown Housing Inc. and as public relations director and then research director of the Trades and Labour Congress of Canada. Upon the creation of the Canadian Labour Congress in 1956, he became the new body's legislative director. Wismer was expelled by the Ottawa Labour Council and resigned from his position with the CLC due to a spending and conflict of interest scandal related to Wismer's role at Mooretown Housing, a labour council owned housing development. In 1957, Wismer was appointed head of organizing for the National Defence Employees Association.

He died in Winchester General Hospital at the age of 69.
