= Edmond Baird Ryckman =

Canadian politician

The Hon. Edmond Baird Ryckman

Member of the Canadian Parliament for Toronto East
- In office 1921–1934
- Preceded by: Albert Edward Kemp
- Succeeded by: Thomas Langton Church

Personal details
- Born: April 15, 1866 Huntingdon, Canada East
- Died: January 11, 1934 (aged 67)
- Party: Conservative
- Cabinet: Minister of Public Works (1926); Minister of National Revenue (1930–1933)

Edmond Baird Ryckman, PC (April 15, 1866 – January 11, 1934) was a Canadian politician.

Born in Huntingdon, Canada East, he moved with his family to Kingston, Canada West, and then Guelph. He was educated at Brantford Collegiate Institute, the University of Toronto, and Osgoode Hall. His father, E.B. Ryckman, was a Methodist minister.

After graduating from law school, Ryckman formed the commercial and corporate law firm Ryckman, Kirkpatrick, Kerr and MacInnes, which represented Canadian companies including Molson Bank.

He was first elected to the House of Commons of Canada for the riding of Toronto East in the 1921 federal election. A Conservative, he was re-elected in 1925, 1926, and 1930.

In 1926, he was the Minister of Public Works in the short lived cabinet of Arthur Meighen; when he accepted the post he resigned his position as president of the Dunlop Tire and Rubber Goods Company.

From 1930 to 1933, he was the Minister of National Revenue.

1921 Canadian federal election: Toronto East
Party	Candidate	Votes	%	±%
Conservative	Edmond Baird Ryckman	5,392		
Progressive	Walter Leigh Rayfield	3,984		
Independent	Thomas Foster	3,680		
Labour	John William Bruce	1,822		
Liberal	Elizabeth Bethune Kiely	52		

1925 Canadian federal election: Toronto East
Party	Candidate	Votes	%	±%
Conservative	Edmond Baird Ryckman	17,663		
Liberal	Gerald Farrell	4,036		

1926 Canadian federal election: Toronto East
Party	Candidate	Votes	%	±%
Conservative	Edmond Baird Ryckman	13,789		
Liberal	Kathleen Bennett	3,299		

1930 Canadian federal election: Toronto East
Party	Candidate	Votes	%	±%
Conservative	Edmond Baird Ryckman	13,423		
Liberal	Robert A. Allen	6,348		
