= John O'Donohoe =

Canadian politician (1824–1902)

The Honourable John O'Donohoe
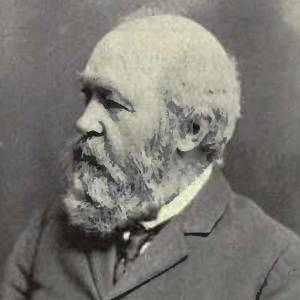

Member of Parliament for Toronto East
- In office March 26, 1874 – November 26, 1874
- Preceded by: James Beaty, Sr.
- Succeeded by: Samuel Platt

Canadian Senator from Ontario
- In office May 21, 1882 – December 7, 1902

Personal details
- Born: April 18, 1824 Tuam, Galway, Ireland
- Died: December 7, 1902 (aged 78) Toronto, Ontario, Canada
- Party: Liberal

John O'Donohoe (April 18, 1824 – December 7, 1902) was a Canadian politician.

== Background ==
Born at Tuam in County Galway, Ireland, O'Donohoe was educated at St. Jarlath's College. In 1839, he emigrated to Toronto and married Charlotte Josephine Bradley in 1848. He was called to the Bar of Ontario in 1869 and was appointed Q.C. in 1880. O'Donohoe practised law in Toronto and served as crown attorney for York County and the City of Toronto.

Before entering politics, O'Donohoe was an auctioneer and a land speculator. On one piece of land on Shuter Street in Toronto, O'Donohoe had constructed in 1856 a row of terrace homes named O'Donohoe Row. Although renamed Walnut Hall in 1903, the building survived until 2007.

== Political career ==
O'Donohoe served as an alderman on Toronto City Council in 1857 and 1859.

O'Donohoe ran unsuccessfully for the Legislative Assembly of Ontario in the 1871 election and in an 1872 by-election. He ran for the House of Commons of Canada in the 1872 federal election for the riding of Toronto East and was defeated. He was elected in the 1874 election but was unseated on petition in November 1874 and lost the resulting 1875 by-election. He was appointed to the Senate on the advice of John Alexander Macdonald in May 1882 representing the senatorial division of Erie, Ontario. A Liberal-Conservative, he served 21 years until his death in 1902.
