= George Oakley =

Canadian politician

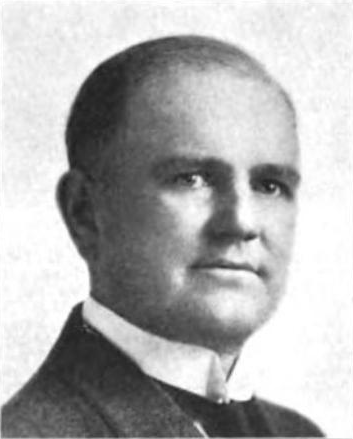

Ontario MPP
- In office 1923–1934
- Preceded by: Joseph McNamara
- Succeeded by: Robert Allen
- Constituency: Riverdale

Personal details
- Born: April 25, 1877; Toronto, Ontario
- Died: December 3, 1934 (aged 57); Hamilton, Ontario
- Political party: Conservative
- Spouse: Ethel Priestman
- Occupation: Businessman

George Oakley (April 25, 1877 – December 3, 1934) was a building contractor, sports team president and political figure in Ontario. He represented Riverdale in the Legislative Assembly of Ontario from 1923 to 1934 as a Conservative member.

He was born in Toronto, the son of George D. Oakley and Ann Todd, both natives of England, and was educated in Toronto. He began work as a stone cutter with his father and later went to England to gain additional experience. After his return, Oakley joined his father's company and, after his father's death, became president of George Oakley & Son Limited. Oakley was also president of the Central Canada Cut Stone Company. He served on the Board of Education. Oakley married Ethel Priestman. In 1934, it was alleged that Oakley was part of a price fixing agreement related to building stone supplied for construction on the East Block of Queen's Park. He was president of the Toronto Maple Leafs baseball team from 1931 until his death. Oakley died in Hamilton at the age of 57.
