= Strubby =

Village in the East Lindsey district of Lincolnshire, England

Coordinates: 53.317814°N 0.180393°E

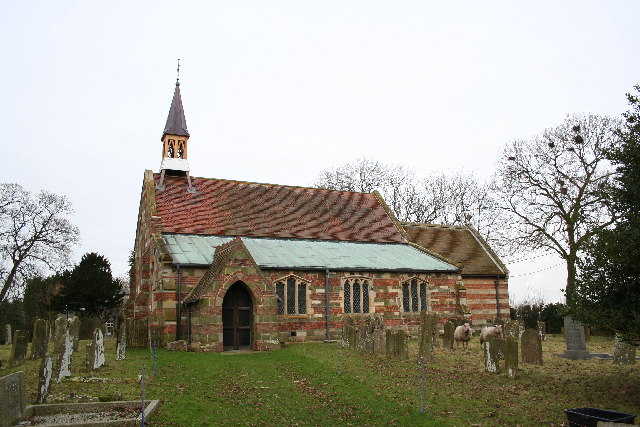
- St Oswald's Church, Strubby

- Location within Lincolnshire
- Population: 116 (2011)
- OS grid reference: TF453823
  - London: 125 mi (201 km) S
- Civil parish: Strubby with Woodthorpe
- District: East Lindsey
- Shire county: Lincolnshire
- Region: East Midlands
- Country: England
- Sovereign state: United Kingdom
- Post town: Alford
- Postcode district: LN13
- Police: Lincolnshire
- Fire: Lincolnshire
- Ambulance: East Midlands
- UK Parliament: Louth and Horncastle

Strubby is a village in the East Lindsey district of Lincolnshire, England. It is situated just north of the A157 road, 8 miles (13 km) south-east from Louth and 4 miles (6.4 km) north from Alford. The village forms part of Strubby and Woodthorpe civil parish, with the nearby hamlet of Woodthorpe.

== History ==
The parish church is a Grade II* listed building dedicated to Saint Oswald, dating from the 13th century, although it was largely rebuilt in 1857 by Maughan and Fowler, with exception of the chancel which was built in 1874 by Ewan Christian. It is an edifice of brick and stone in the early Decorated and Perpendicular styles. The font is 15th century. In the nave is a small tablet to William Ballett who died in 1648 aged 99, of Woodthorpe Hall.

Thomas Wilson, the author of Logique (1551) and The Arte of Rhetorique (1553) was the eldest son of Thomas Wilson, a farmer of Strubby, and his wife Anne. As well as a scholar and author, Wilson was a diplomat and judge, and held the position of privy councillor in the government of Elizabeth I. The Wilson family were originally from Yorkshire and settled in Strubby in the mid-15th century.

== Airfield ==
Opened in 1944, RAF Strubby was the most easterly of Lincolnshire's airfields. Operating from RAF Strubby were:

- 280 Squadron – May 1944 – Sept 1944
- 144 Squadron – July 1944 – Sept 1944
- 404 Squadron – July 1944 – Sept 1944
- 619 Squadron – Autumn 1944 – June 1945
- 227 Squadron – Summer 1945

Strubby Gliding Club opened at the now Strubby Airfield in 1978. It changed its name to the Lincolnshire Gliding Club in the 1990s. Woodthorpe Kart Club is also based at the airfield.

== Woodthorpe ==
Woodthorpe is a hamlet belonging to Strubby, and is situated about 2 miles (3.2 km) south. There was a school here erected in 1878.

Woodthorpe Hall is a substantial red brick Tudor moated mansion formerly the seat of the Ballett family, and is a Grade II listed building.
