= James Beaty Sr. =

Irish-Canadian politician

James Beaty
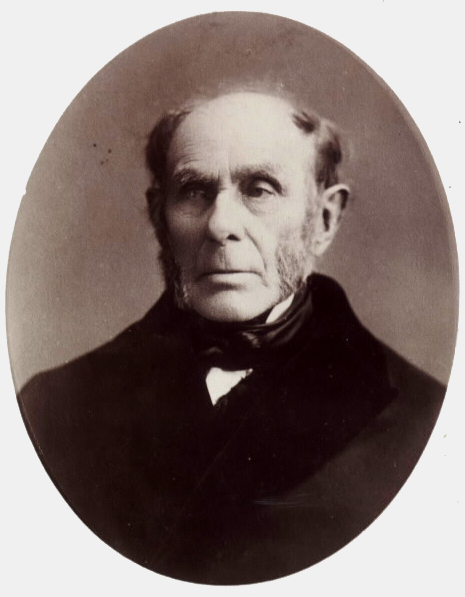

Member of the Canadian Parliament for Toronto East
- In office 6 November 1867 – 2 January 1874
- Succeeded by: John O'Donohoe

Personal details
- Born: 2 October 1798 Killeshandra, County Cavan, Ireland
- Died: 5 March 1892 (aged 93) Toronto, Ontario
- Party: Conservative

James Beaty (2 October 1798 – 5 March 1892) was a Member of Canada's Parliament from 1867 to 1874, and published the Toronto Leader newspaper.

Beaty was born in Killeshandra, County Cavan, Ireland, emigrating to Canada in 1818. He married Sarah Ann Armstrong (1799–1829) on 26 December 1822. He never remarried after her death.

He was elected to the 1st Canadian Parliament on 20 September 1867 under the Conservative Party. He was re-elected in 1872 for the 2nd Canadian Parliament, his final term in federal politics.

A member of the Disciples of Christ Christian denomination, he was active in establishing new congregations.

In 1852, Beaty established the Toronto Leader newspaper. He would also be active in other businesses.

Beatty positioned himself as a champion of unions, when the typographers of Toronto went on strike in 1872. This put him in direct opposition to George Brown and the Globe newspaper.

He was sometimes referred to as James Beaty, Sen. (senior). A nephew of the same name, James Beaty (1831-1899), would also serve as a Member of Parliament from 1880 to 1887.

Beaty died in Toronto (Parkdale). His funeral was conducted at his residence on Fuller Street.
