= Frederick J. Conboy =

Canadian politician

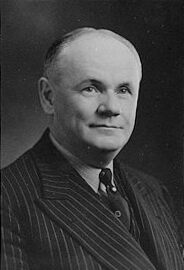
- Conboy, c. 1944

47th Mayor of Toronto
- In office 1941–1944
- Preceded by: Ralph Day
- Succeeded by: Robert Saunders

Personal details
- Born: Frederick Joseph Conboy; January 1, 1883 Toronto, Ontario, Canada
- Died: March 29, 1949 (aged 66) Toronto, Ontario, Canada
- Profession: Dental surgeon

Frederick Joseph Conboy (January 1, 1883 – March 29, 1949) was a Canadian politician, who served as mayor of Toronto, Ontario from 1941 to 1944. He was also a member of the Orange Order in Canada.

Before entering politics, Conboy was a dental surgeon, served as a professor at the Royal College of Dental Surgeons, secretary of the Ontario Dental Association and editor of the association's journal.

== Background ==
Frederick Conboy was born in Toronto to James and Sarah Conboy, the youngest of seven children. He attended the Toronto public schools (Dovercourt, Dewson and Givens Public Schools and Humberside Collegiate) and graduated from the Royal College of Dental Surgeons of Ontario. In 1904, Conboy opened his office at Bloor and Westmoreland Street, a short distance from the farm where he grew up. He was a professor of dental praxis at the School of Dentistry beginning in 1917.

Conboy was a member of the Masonic Order, Orange Order and the Odd Fellows. A charter member and elder of Westmoreland United Church, he was superintendent of the Sunday school for more than twenty years. It was believed he was one of the first members of the church.

"The church," he often said, "never fails in the matter of relief for needy citizens and there is no better place where young people can fit themselves for future citizenship than in promoting its welfare work."

Conboy had a variety of hobbies. He belonged to two golf clubs and maintained an extensive victory garden.

In 1924, while summering at Wasaga Beach, he discovered a cannonball at the edge of the Nottawasaga River. Conboy spent the next two seasons prowling around and discovered the hull of a sunken ship buried in a large island that had formed around the wreck. He had discovered the remains of HMS Nancy, a British armed schooner sunk by the Americans on August 11, 1814, during the War of 1812. Conboy interested the Ontario government in the preservation of the historic relic and, thanks to his persistence, the hull was excavated, raised, placed on the island and made available for public inspection. In recognition of his enterprise, his friends presented him with a model of the ship carved from her original timber.

== Dentistry ==
He was a doctor of dental science at the University of Toronto. He served on the faculty of the dental college and was a member of the executive of the health section of the Ontario Educational Association.

In 1925, Conboy was appointed director of dental services for the province of Ontario. He contributed much to the advancement of the profession and devoted one day a week to organizing dental services in Toronto schools.

In 1926 he became director of dental service for the province, a position he held for ten years. He also served for twenty years as secretary and treasurer of the Ontario Dental Association. In 1935 he was appointed a professor at the School of Optometry.

In May 1943, Conboy was honored at a convention of the Ontario Dental Association. He was presented with an oil portrait of himself (painted by Cleeve Horne), which Conboy in turn presented to the University of Toronto to be hung in the Dental Faculty Building. At this presentation, Dr. E. W. Paul, said that Conboy was born in Toronto of humble, sturdy, but highly regarded Irish parents, who instilled in him the fear of God and the importance of hard work.

== Politics ==
Conboy first entered civic government a member of the Board of Education from 1909 to 1914, and served a term as chairman.

In the 1935 Toronto municipal election, he was elected as alderman for Ward 6, polling the largest vote of any alderman-elect. Also elected as aldermen at same time were future mayors Allan Lamport, Nathan Phillips and Robert Saunders.

Conboy immediately introduced resolutions which keynoted his public career: resolutions on unemployment, slum clearance, youth placement, city planning, relief works programs, street lighting, public health education. He was elected to the board of control one year later. As a member of city council, Conboy campaigned for the development of an island airport and harbour facilities.

After serving two terms as alderman, Conboy stood for the Board of Control in the December 1936 election. He was re-elected in 1939.

Conboy stood for mayor in the 1941 election, and won with a majority of 22,000 votes. The following day, he modestly confessed that, because of the light poll, he figured he was unlikely to be re-elected. Responding to an appeal to boost Canada's Reserve Army, he joined The Queen's Own Rifles of Canada as a Private and later accompanied his unit to camp at Niagara as Corporal Conboy.

During his wartime years in office as Mayor, Conboy began a campaign for better housing, which has resulted in such projects as Regent Park. He was also responsible for the introduction of resolutions connected with unemployment, slum clearance, relief words programs, public health education, street lighting and city planning. As an impetus to the city plan to raise $1,000,000 for war equipment in 1941, he gave one-fifth of his controller's salary.

Conboy faced no opponents and was elected by acclamation in 1942 and 1943. In 1944, he defeated Lewis Duncan. During his fourth term, he was elected president of the Federation of Canadian Municipalities. He was defeated by Robert Hood Saunders in the election of 1945.

== Post-politics ==
He was a member of the Board of Education from 1909 to 1914, and served a term as chairman.

Conboy was a member of the board of directors of the Social Service Council of Ontario and had been prominent as organizer in social welfare, particularly in his own profession.

A president of the Community Welfare Council of Ontario, Conboy many times stated he felt public officials should be part of a church community. "I know my work there has been a worthwhile task", he said, regarding his position as Sunday school superintendent at Westmoreland church. "Never did a church school have as much responsibility as it has today in these troublous times."

His Irish Protestant heritage was again noted on January 4, 1945, by Controller Saunders in his motion to record in the city records an appreciation of Conboy's work. The council stated that "A great measure of his (Conboy's) success may be attributed to his background of Irish ancestry and the instilling into his youthful mind by his God-fearing parents, the importance in life of those attributes of honesty, perseverance, sympathy and tolerance and the lesson that men do not break down from overwork but from worry and dissipation.. ...His fine discriminating mind and broad and sympathetic outlook on life have been a tower of strength to his fellow colleagues in Council during the past four years of war fraught with such gave potentiality to the continuance of our present civilization. .....To him this Council gives the assurance that the citizens of Toronto will remember him always with pleasant recollections, as a true Canadian, who has done his full duty as a citizen of Toronto."

In April 1948, Conboy was struck by a car, at the corner of St. Clair and Oakwood. Two months later he was in the thick of the provincial election as Progressive Conservative candidate in Bracondale and he campaigned with vigor. But the accident had shaken him more than he would admit.

In the fall of 1948, his health began to fail rapidly. He carried on without complaint until March 19, 1949, when he went to hospital for observation and rest. Two weeks previously his wife was taken to the same hospital for surgical treatment. He died on March 29, 1949, aged 66.

His death concluded a career in public service. Toronto city council expressed its regret regarding his death. The council noted that Conboy participated in various organizations focused on social cooperation, civil rights, and religious matters. Conboy was a resident of his native city who participated in various fields and was a member of municipal government.
