= Toronto Leader =

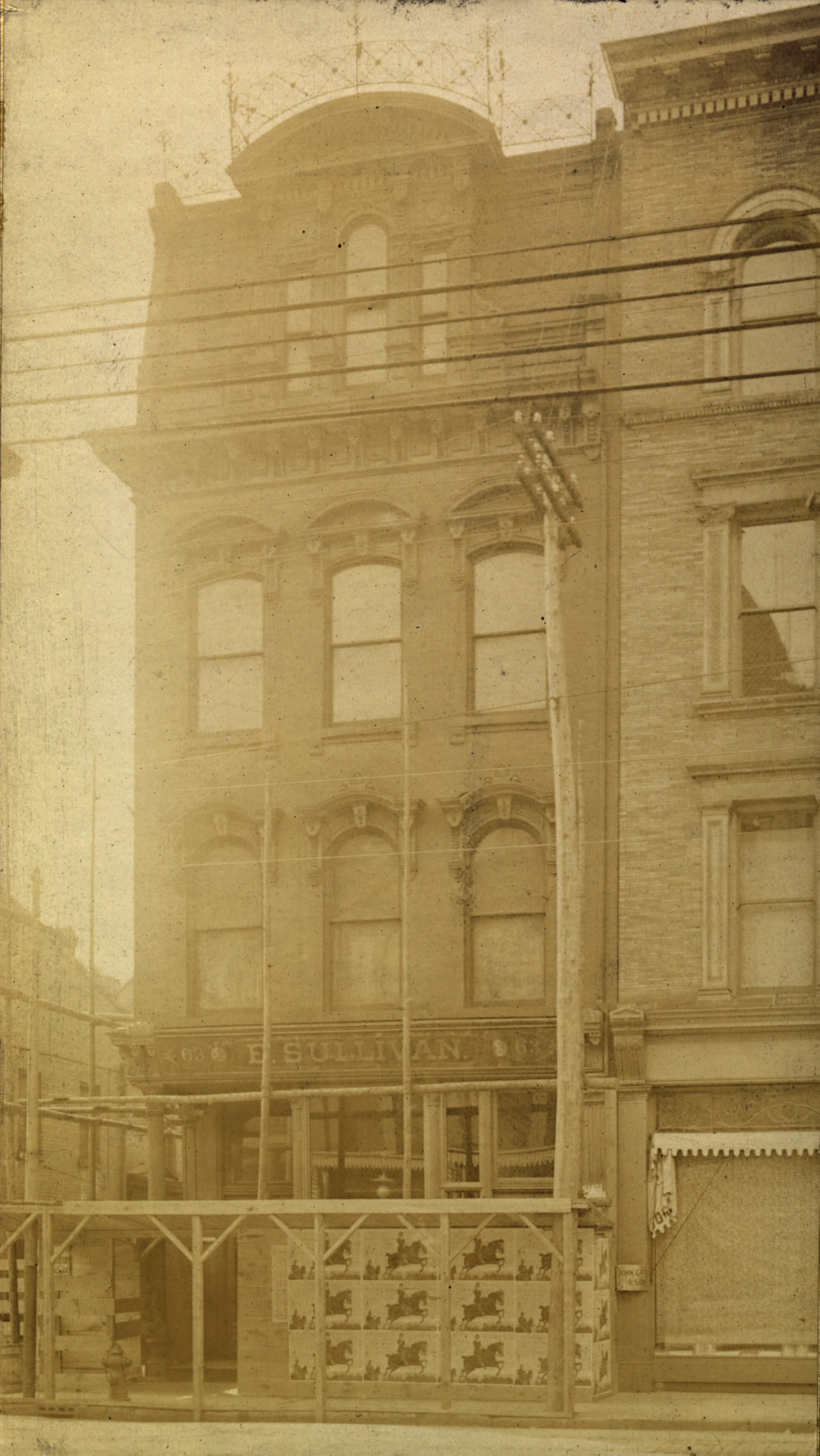
Offices of the Toronto Leader.

The Toronto Leader was a newspaper published in Toronto, Ontario, Canada in the 19th century. The paper was published by James Beaty, a wealthy leather merchant. Its office were located on what is now Leader Lane from 1852 to 1878.

An article published in The New York Times in 1861 called the paper the "recognized Government organ of Canada West." The archives of several other newspapers quote or otherwise reference the Toronto Leader.
