= Gordon Millen =

Canadian politician

Ontario MPP
- In office 1945–1948
- Preceded by: Leslie Wismer
- Succeeded by: Leslie Wismer
- Constituency: Riverdale

Personal details
- Born: September 8, 1899 Toronto, Ontario, Canada
- Died: April 10, 1948 (aged 48)
- Party: Progressive Conservative
- Profession: Dentist

Gordon James Millen (September 8, 1899 – April 10, 1948) was a politician from Toronto, Ontario, Canada. He served several years on city council before being elected as a Member of Provincial Parliament.

== Background ==
Millen was a dentist by profession, and served in the First World War with the Canadian Army Dental Corps. In Toronto he set up a practice on Danforth Avenue and became involved in the local community. He served as president of the Danforth Business Association.

== Politics ==
In 1932 he ran for city council but failed to get elected. He was finally successful in the 1937 election, winning a seat in Ward 1.

In 1945 he won the provincial Progressive Conservative nomination for the riding of Riverdale in a close contest against his fellow Ward 1 alderman Leslie Saunders. In the 1945 Ontario election Millen won the seat, defeating incumbent Leslie Wismer of the CCF.

Part way through his first term Millen fell ill and died in April 1948. The baseball stadium that then stood in Riverdale Park was named Millen Memorial Stadium in his honour.

1945 Ontario general election: Riverdale
Party	Candidate	Votes	%
Progressive Conservative	Gordon Millen	11,769	39.8
Co-operative Commonwealth	Leslie Wismer	7,851	31.2
Liberal	Capt. W.R. Allen	3,722	27.4
Labor–Progressive	Harry Bell	611	1.3
Socialist Labor	Richard Dunk	186	0.3
Total		28,501	
Canadian Press (1945-06-05). "How Ontario Electors Voted in all 90 Ridings". The Toronto Daily Star. Toronto. p. 5.
