= Lewis Duncan =

Canadian politician and lawyer (1892–1960)

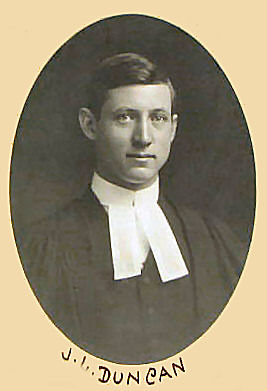
- Born: James Lewis Duncan; 1892; Toronto, Ontario, Canada
- Died: April 8, 1960 (aged 67–68); Toronto, Ontario, Canada
- Education: University of Toronto
- Occupation: Lawyer

James Lewis Duncan (1892 – 8 April 1960) was a Canadian politician and lawyer.

== Early life ==
Duncan was the son of a physician and grandson of a Presbyterian minister. He studied at the University of Toronto and in Paris and won a silver medal as a student at Osgoode Hall Law School. He fought in the First World War at the Somme, Vimy Ridge and Passchendaele. He was appointed military administrator of occupied Bonn, Germany and ended the war with the rank of Major.

== Career ==
Returning to Canada he was appointed chair of a Fair Price Commission on milk, wrote a book on bankruptcy law and sat on a royal commission investigating farm fraud in British Columbia and helped write Canada's Combines Investigation Act.

In the 1930s, Ontario Hydro retained Duncan for a two-year investigation, leading him to be criticized by the Ontario Premier Mitchell Hepburn for charging $17,000 in legal fees. Duncan was expelled from the ruling Ontario Liberal Party and responded by comparing Hepburn to Adolf Hitler and Hepburn called Duncan "a rat."

He was elected to Toronto City Council in the 1930s and ran for Mayor of Toronto in 1939 but was defeated by Ralph C. Day by a margin of 39,000 votes and again in 1940 by only 4,000 votes. He returned to city council as a member of the Board of Control in 1941 topping the polls in the election for the four-person executive body (the Mayor sat ex officio as the Chairman) and sat on the body until 1944. As Vice-Chairman of the Board of Control, Duncan charged the city with being run as a family compact and accused the Toronto Transit Commission of not disclosing its books. Duncan also started a major investigation in 1942 when he charged that a child receiving relief had died of malnutrition.

Duncan ran as a federal Liberal candidate for the House of Commons of Canada in the 1940 election in the Danforth electoral district. He was defeated in a two-way race against Conservative Joseph Henry Harris.

Duncan then joined the Co-operative Commonwealth Federation (Ontario Section), and ran again for Mayor of Toronto in 1944 but was defeated by Frederick J. Conboy by 20,000 votes. He also ran in the 1945 Ontario election as the CCF's candidate in the riding of High Park against George Drew, accusing him of being financed by "beer barons", but was defeated. He then challenged Ontario CCF Ted Jolliffe for the party's leadership, but was defeated by Jolliffe at the 1946 Ontario CCF convention in Hamilton, Ontario.

Duncan had a colourful reputation as a lawyer. He once challenged a Supreme Court justice to step out of his courtroom and repeat his statements in the hallway and was fined $2,000 in 1957 for "scandalizing the court" when he asked a Supreme Court justice to withdraw himself from a hearing without giving a reason. He never paid the fine but was barred thereafter from arguing cases before the Supreme Court.

== Death ==
Duncan died aged 68, on 8 April 1960, when he shot himself in the washroom of a downtown Toronto department store. According to The Globe and Mail, Duncan was "long disturbed over the death of his only son, John, in the Second World War."
