= 1920 Toronto municipal election =

Municipal elections were held in Toronto, Ontario, Canada, on January 1, 1920. Mayor Tommy Church was elected to his sixth consecutive term in office. The most notable feature of the election was Constance Hamilton winning a seat in Ward 3. She became the first woman elected to as high a post in any government in Ontario.

== Toronto mayor ==
Church had first been elected mayor in 1915 and had been reelected every year since. He was opposed by Controller Sam McBride and James M.H. Ballantyne who was Labour's candidate. Church was reelected, but not by an overwhelming margin.

Results
Tommy Church (incumbent) - 25,689
Sam McBride - 20,775
James M.H. Ballantyne - 5,573

== Board of Control ==
Two new members of the Board of Control were elected. J. George Ramsden and Joseph Gibbons. One of the vacancies was created by McBride's decision to run for mayor. Sitting Controller William D. Robbins was the only incumbent defeated.

Results
Charles A. Maguire (incumbent) - 28,438
Joseph Gibbons - 23,269
R.H. Cameron (incumbent) - 21,055
J. George Ramsden - 18,473
William D. Robbins (incumbent) - 17,716
Herbert Henry Ball - 16,506
James Simpson - 10,832
Jesse Green Wright - 7,927

== City council ==
Ward 1 (Riverdale)
Frank Marsden Johnson (incumbent) - 3,737
Richard Honeyford (incumbent) - 3,508
W. W. Hiltz (incumbent) - 3,507
A.H. Wagstaff - 2,329
Arthur J. Stubbings - 1,699
William J. Story - 1,340

Ward 2 (Cabbagetown and Rosedale)
J.R. Beamish (incumbent) - 2,884
John Winnett (incumbent) - 2,675
Charles A. Risk - 2,661
Clara Brett Martin - 1,314
Frederick Hogg - 1,286
Joseph Kent - 988
John N. Day - 668
Harry Hine - 463

Ward 3 (Central Business District and The Ward)
F.W. Johnston (incumbent) - 1,835
Alfred Burgess - 1,825
Constance Hamilton - 1,626
Charles W. Mugridge (incumbent) - 1,388
George Rose - 1,369
John W. Beatty - 1,284
William Harper - 945
Harry Winberg - 943
William Stevenson - 383

Ward 4 (Kensington Market and Garment District)
Joseph Singer - 2,791
Arthur Russell Nesbitt (incumbent) - 2,609
John Cowan (incumbent) - 2,227
Adam G. McIntyre - 2,142
Lewis LeGrow - 1,165
George J. Castle - 486

Ward 5 (Trinity-Bellwoods)
Clifford Blackburn (incumbent) - 3,630
W.R. Plewman (incumbent) - 3,624
James Phinnemore - 2,510
George H. Gustar - 2,449
A.E. Hacker - 1,596
William B. Hunter - 1,253
J.J. Hubbard - 1,157
John W. Huggins - 1,010

Ward 6 (Davenport and Parkdale)
George Birdsall (incumbent) - 6,454
D.C. MacGregor (incumbent) - 6,217
Brook Sykes (incumbent) - 5,678
Alvin L. Gadsby - 2,214
O. Earl Hodgson - 1,131
William C. Dicks - 946
William Brant - 606

Ward 7 (West Toronto Junction)
Samuel Ryding (incumbent) - 1,697
Frank Whetter (incumbent) - 1,418
William Maher (incumbent) - 1,327
George T. Bond - 1,166
Ernest A. Dalton - 773

Ward 8 (East Toronto)
Frederick Baker (incumbent) - 2,285
Frances Maxwell- 2,147
William M. Miskelly (incumbent) - 2,118
Walter Brown - 1,884
