= 1922 Toronto municipal election =

Municipal elections were held in Toronto, Ontario, Canada, on January 2, 1922. Incumbent mayor Tommy Church did not run for reelection. Charles A. Maguire was the only candidate who ran to succeed him and he was acclaimed.

== Toronto mayor ==
Results
Charles A. Maguire - acclaimed

== Board of Control ==
Former Controller returned to the Toronto Board of Control after a four-year absence, after spending a term as a Member of Parliament. The three incumbent Controllers were re-elected.

Results
Thomas Foster - 23,355
Wesley Hiltz (incumbent) - 20,001
Joseph Gibbons (incumbent) - 18,647
A.R. Nesbitt (incumbent) - 16,453
William D. Robbins - 16,814
R.H. Cameron - 15,403
J. George Ramsden - 14,721
Clifford Blackburn - 12,950
William Varley - 3,419

== City council ==
Ward 1 (Riverdale)
W.A. Summerville - 4,282
F.M. Johnson (incumbent) - 3,829
Robert Luxton - 2,587
A.J. Stubbings - 1,893

Ward 2 (Cabbagetown and Rosedale)
John Winnett (incumbent) - 2,523
Charles A. Risk (incumbent) - 2,520
J.R. Beamish (incumbent) - 2,413
Herbert Henry Ball - 2,243
J.N. Day - 912
W.J. Street - 803
Andrew Ruppert - 486

Ward 3 (Central Business District and The Ward)
Harry W. Hunt - 2,742
Alfred Burgess (incumbent) - 1,547
C.A. Reed - 1,547
Andrew Carrick - 1,423
F.W. Johnston - 1,808
George Rose (incumbent) - 1,088
Aubrey Bond - 877
Constance Boulton - 814
C.W. Mogridge - 433
Joseph Kent - 413
W.H. Scott - 168

Ward 4 (Kensington Market and Garment District)
Joseph Singer (incumbent) - 2,179
John Cowan (incumbent) - 2,146
Ethel Small (incumbent) - 2,060
Claude Pearce - 1,707
Lewis LeGrow - 1,007
Harry Winberg - 862
A. Draimin - 725
J.J. Higgins - 586
P.W. Benner - 452

Ward 5 (Trinity-Bellwoods)
W.R. Plewman - 2,900
A.E. Hacker (incumbent) - 2,895
Wesley Benson - 2,117
James Phinnemore (incumbent) - 2,110
Thomas Jones - 1,896
Ben Spence - 1,233
George Gustar - 1,113
Robert Prince - 885
Caroline Brown - 866
Albert Plenty - 692
Water Boon - 231

Ward 6 (Davenport and Parkdale)
George Birdsall (incumbent) - 5,991
Brook Sykes (incumbent) - 5,629
D.C. MacGregor (incumbent) - 5,389
John A. Austin - 3,269
Earl Hodgson - 1,203
James Stockley - 928

Ward 7 (West Toronto Junction)
Samuel Ryding (incumbent) - 1,991
H. M. Davy (incumbent) - 1,880
Frank Whetter (incumbent) - 1,576
William Maher - 1,852
Thomas Bond - 782

Ward 8 (East Toronto)
Robert Baker (incumbent) - 2,301
George Cruise (incumbent) - 2,168
Francis Maxwell (incumbent) - 1,997
J.T. Turner - 1,286
J.V. Conroy - 971
A.H. Chambers - 971
W.H. Ford - 880
Hector Demers - 612
Isaac Pimblett - 443
Thomas Scott - 382

Results taken from the January 1, 1922 Toronto Daily Star and might not exactly match final tallies.
