= 1923 Toronto municipal election =

Municipal elections were held in Toronto, Ontario, Canada, on January 1, 1923. Charles A. Maguire was reelected to his second term as mayor.

== Toronto mayor ==
Charles A. Maguire had been acclaimed as mayor the election previously. The 1923 campaign focused on Sir Adam Beck's proposal of an electrical radial railway along the length of the Toronto water front and further into the neighbouring cities. Maguire was in favour of the controversial plan. His main opponent was R.J. Fleming who opposed the scheme. Fleming had previously served as mayor of Toronto several decades previously. The radial plan was voted down in a referendum that accompanied the vote, but Maguire was reelected mayor.

Results
Charles A. Maguire - 46,362
R.J. Fleming - 38,961

== Board of Control ==
One new member was elected to the Board of Control: Alderman Joseph Singer.

Results
Thomas Foster (incumbent) - 36,040
Joseph Gibbons (incumbent) - 33,740
Wesley Hiltz (incumbent) - 32,551
Joseph Singer - 32,033
Sam McBride - 30,606
A.R. Nesbitt (incumbent) - 29,947
Alfred Burgess - 24,876
J.R.I. Starr - 25,931

== City council ==
Other than Ward plus number, the names are not official, and given here only as a guide to current-day places.

Ward 1 (Riverdale)
W.A. Summerville (incumbent) - 5,236
William D. Robbins - 4,987
Robert Luxton (incumbent) - 3,916
F.M. Johnston (incumbent) - 3,682
James Burry - 2,743
William Varley - 2,063

Ward 2 (Cabbagetown and Rosedale)
J.R. Beamish (incumbent) - 4,939
Charles A. Risk (incumbent) - 4,249
W.H. Shaw - 4,173
Bert Wemp - 3,503
John Winnett (incumbent) - 3,281
Herbert Henry Ball - 3,080
Wallace - 208

Ward 3 (Central Business District and The Ward)
Frank Stollery - 5,786
Andrew Carrick - 5,190
H.G. Stanton - 4,942
Harry W. Hunt (incumbent) - 3,537
C.A. Reed (incumbent) - 3,086
F.W. Johnston - 3,662
William Harper - 587

Ward 4 (Kensington Market and Garment District)
Ethel Small (incumbent) - 4,878
R.H. Cameron - 3,879
Claude Pearce - 3,382
John Cowan (incumbent) - 2,608
John McMulkin - 2,305
Harry Winberg - 1,947
E.B. Westwood - 1,878
P.W. Benner - 458

Ward 5 (Trinity-Bellwoods)
Clifford Blackburn - 5,540
A.E. Hacker (incumbent) - 5,391
Wesley Benson (incumbent) - 5,061
James Phinnemore - 4,107
C.W. Mogridge - 2,915
William Faragher - 2,909
Abraham Goldberg - 1,061

Ward 6 (Brockton and Parkdale)
Fred McBrien - 8,637
D.C. MacGregor (incumbent) - 7,738
George Birdsall (incumbent) - 6,942
Brook Sykes (incumbent) - 6,684
Edmund Atkinson - 5,783
W.H. Price - 5,222

Ward 7 (West Toronto Junction)
Frank Whetter (incumbent) - 2,937
H.M Davy (incumbent) - 2,762
Samuel Ryding (incumbent) - 2,546
W.A. Baird - 2,536
Hain - 2,410

Ward 8 (East Toronto)
Robert Baker (incumbent) - 4,337
George S. Shields - 3,992
Francis Maxwell (incumbent) - 3,392
William Miskelly - 3,266
Walter Brown - 2,571
Isaac Pimblett - 1,481

Results taken from the January 1, 1923 Toronto Daily Star and might not exactly match final tallies.
