= 1921 Toronto municipal election =

Municipal elections were held in Toronto, Ontario, Canada, on January 1, 1921. Mayor Tommy Church was elected to an unprecedented seventh consecutive term in office.

== Toronto mayor ==
Church had first been elected mayor in 1915 and had been reelected every year since. He was opposed by Sam McBride, who had also challenged Church for the mayoralty in the previous election.

Results
Tommy Church - 35,959
Sam McBride - 19,966

== Board of Control ==
Two sitting members of the Board of Control were defeated: J. George Ramsden and R.H. Cameron.

Results
Charles A. Maguire (incumbent) - 34,141
Wesley Hiltz - 22,615
Joseph Gibbons (incumbent) - 18,612
A.R. Nesbitt - 19,202
William D. Robbins - 18,015
R.H. Cameron (incumbent) - 17,872
J. George Ramsden (incumbent) - 17,393
Herbert Henry Ball - 16,911

== City council ==
Ward 1 (Riverdale)
Richard Honeyford (incumbent) - 3,637
F.M. Johnson (incumbent) - 3,829
A.H. Wagstaff - 2,807
W.A. Summerville - 2,447
W.J. Story - 1,106
A.J. Stubbings - 944
J.E. Barnett - 872
W.J. Carmichael - 275
T. Rennick - 257
W.S.B. Armstrong - 195

Ward 2 (Cabbagetown and Rosedale)
John Winnett (incumbent) - 3,436
Charles A. Risk (incumbent) - 3,086
J.R. Beamish (incumbent) - 2,836
J.M. Day - 1,402
Frederick Hogg - 1,190
W.J. Street - 966
Andrew Ruppert - 535
K. Frawley - 494

Ward 3 (Central Business District and The Ward)
Alfred Burgess (incumbent) - 2,685
George Rose - 1,867
Constance Hamilton (incumbent) - 1,815
F.W. Johnston (incumbent) - 1,614
C.A. Reed - 1,608
Aubrey Bond - 1,604
Andrew Carrick - 1,182
Robert Morse - 211

Ward 4 (Kensington Market and Garment District)
John Cowan (incumbent) - 2,698
Ethel Small - 2,616
Joseph Singer (incumbent) - 2,413
A.G. McIntyre - 2,063
C.W. Mogridge - 811
Lewis LeGrow - 431

Ward 5 (Trinity-Bellwoods)
Clifford Blackburn (incumbent) - 4,699
James Phinnemore (incumbent) - 4,103
A.E. Hacker - 3,619
W.R. Plewman (incumbent) - 3,448
R.H. Palmer - 1,040
J.J. Hubbard - 1,033
A. Plenty - 818

Ward 6 (Davenport and Parkdale)
George Birdsall (incumbent) - 7,289
D.C. MacGregor (incumbent) - 6,919
Brook Sykes (incumbent) - 6,581
Earl Hodgson - 1,900
Hattie Stevens - 1,706
R.J. Bradfield - 1,456
R.J. Kirk - 1,305

Ward 7 (West Toronto Junction)
Samuel Ryding (incumbent) - 2,257
Frank Whetter (incumbent) - 2,130
H.M Davy - 1,894
A. Chisholm - 1,418
James Simpson - 1,142

Ward 8 (East Toronto)
Frederick Baker (incumbent) - 3,069
George Cruise - 2,745
Frances Maxwell (incumbent) - 2,499
W.H. Ford - 1,673
H. Ingram - 960
Hector Demers - 931
F.P. England - 608

Results taken from the January 2, 1921 Toronto Daily Star and might not exactly match final tallies.
