= 1918 Toronto municipal election =

Municipal elections were held in Toronto, Ontario, Canada, on January 1, 1918. Mayor Tommy Church was elected to his fourth consecutive term in office.

== Toronto mayor ==
Church had first been elected mayor in 1915 and had been reelected every year since. His opponent was Controller R.H. Cameron, who finished some ten thousand votes behind.

Results
Tommy Church (incumbent) - 27,605
R.H. Cameron - 17,995

== Board of Control ==
There was considerable change to the Board of Control in this election. Three new members were elected: Cameron created one vacancy by choosing to run for mayor, and Thomas Foster had also decided to not run again. Incumbent William Henry Shaw was defeated.

John O'Neill (incumbent) - 24,952
William D. Robbins - 19,000
Sam McBride - 17,850
Charles A. Maguire - 17,711
William Henry Shaw (incumbent) - 14,255
D.C. MacGregor - 14,468
Garnet Archibald - 8,992
Miles Vokes - 2,720
Edward Meek - 2,262

== City council ==
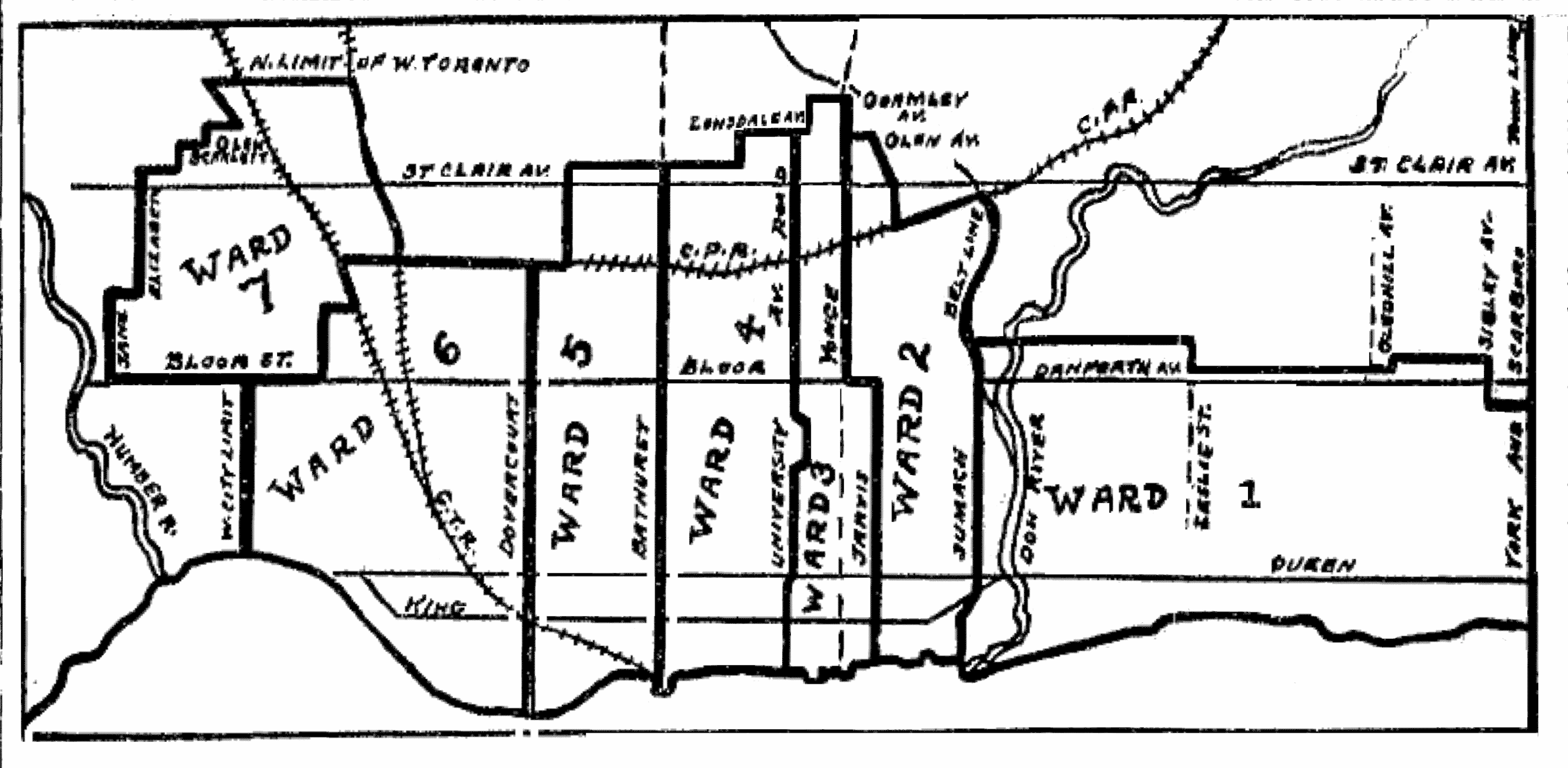
A map of Toronto's seven municipal wards as they existed from 1910 until the 1919 election when Ward 8 (East Toronto) would be added. (Source: Toronto Daily Star, 18 December 1909)

Ward 1 (Riverdale)
W. W. Hiltz (incumbent) - 4,744
Frank Marsden Johnson - 4,387
Richard Honeyford - 4,068
William Fenwick (incumbent) - 2, 866
Walter Brown - 1,961
James Jones - 1,024
Arthur J. Stubbings - 918

Ward 2 (Cabbagetown and Rosedale)
Herbert Henry Ball (incumbent) - acclaimed
J.R. Beamish (incumbent) - acclaimed
Charles A. Risk (incumbent) - acclaimed

Ward 3 (Central Business District and The Ward)
J. George Ramsden (incumbent) - 2,313
Fred McBrien (incumbent) - 2,186
F.W. Johnston - 1,857
Walter Garwood - 1,185
Charles W. Mugridge - 1,012
Thomas Vance - 915

Ward 4 (Kensington Market and Garment District)
Arthur Russell Nesbitt (incumbent) - 2,813
John Cowan - 2,468
John C. McMulkin (incumbent) - 2,400
Louis Singer (incumbent) - 2,365

Ward 5 (Trinity-Bellwoods)
R.H. Graham (incumbent) - 4,347
W.R. Plewman - 4,228
Clifford Blackburn - 2,203
James Phinnemore - 1,799
James Coughlin - 965
Joseph Hubbard - 841
Thomas Vallentyne - 775
Albert Plenty - 649
Lewis Jarvis - 515

Ward 6 (Brockton and Parkdale)
Joseph Gibbons (incumbent) - 5,951
George Birdsall - 4,411
Brook Sykes - 3,789
Alvin L. Gadsby - 3,701

Ward 7 (West Toronto Junction)
Samuel Ryding (incumbent) - 1,461
William Henry Weir - 1,151
William Maher - 733
Peter Grant - 880
Robert Agnew - 1,095

Results taken from the January 1, 1919 Toronto Daily Star and might not exactly match final tallies.

== Vacancy ==
Ward 7 Alderman William Henry Weir dies December 11, 1918 and is not replaced.
