= 1919 Toronto municipal election =

Municipal elections were held in Toronto, Ontario, Canada, on January 1, 1919. Mayor Tommy Church was elected to his fifth consecutive term in office. This election marked the creation of Ward 8, covering the recently annexed areas of East Toronto. The representation of Ward 7 was also increased to have three alderman like every other ward.

== Toronto mayor ==
Church had first been elected mayor in 1915 and had been reelected every year since. He was opposed by several credible opponents, most notably by Controller John O'Neill who was trying to become the first Roman Catholic to be elected mayor of Toronto. Two other prominent candidates also ran, but failed to win much support. MP and future mayor Thomas Foster and former controller William Henry Shaw.

Results
Tommy Church (incumbent) - 26,020
John O'Neill - 16,230
William Henry Shaw - 3,772
Thomas Foster - 2,180

== Board of Control ==
O'Neill's decision to run for mayor opened one vacancy on the Board of Control. It was filled by former Controller R.H. Cameron who had run unsuccessfully for mayor the year previous.

Results
Charles A. Maguire (incumbent) - 19,963
R.H. Cameron - 19,094
Sam McBride (incumbent) - 18,476
William D. Robbins (incumbent) - 19,270
Joseph Gibbons - 16,397
Garnet Archibald - 15,603
Fred McBrien - 13,570

== City council ==
Ward 1 (Riverdale)
Frank Marsden Johnson (incumbent) - 3,559
Richard Honeyford (incumbent) - 3,555
W. W. Hiltz (incumbent) - 3,533
William Feawick - 2,478
Arthur J. Stubbings - 1,623

Ward 2 (Cabbagetown and Rosedale)
J.R. Beamish (incumbent) - 2,997
John Winnett - 2,582
Herbert Henry Ball (incumbent) - 2,401
Charles A. Risk (incumbent) - 2,060
Joseph Kent - 866

Ward 3 (Central Business District and The Ward)
J. George Ramsden (incumbent) - 3,113
F.W. Johnston (incumbent) - 1,886
Charles W. Mugridge - 1,687
William Harper - 1,463

Ward 4 (Kensington Market and Garment District)
Arthur Russell Nesbitt (incumbent) - 3,644
John Cowan (incumbent) - 2,448
John C. McMulkin (incumbent) - 3,349
Harry Winberg - 1,862
William Brant - 614

Ward 5 (Trinity-Bellwoods)
R.H. Graham (incumbent) - 3,908
W.R. Plewman (incumbent) - 3,185
Clifford Blackburn (incumbent) - 2,853
Angus Beaton - 2,371
James Phinnemore - 1,249
James Coughlin - 1,159
Thomas Ballentyne - 919

Ward 6 (Brockton and Parkdale)
D.C. MacGregor - 5,113
George Birdsall (incumbent) - 4,225
Brook Sykes (incumbent) - 4,098
James M.H. Ballantyne - 2,710
Michael Manley - 1,624
Alex Williamson - 1,360
Alvin L. Gadsby - 869
Richard Holmes - 916

Ward 7 (West Toronto Junction)
Samuel Ryding (incumbent) - 1,435
William Maher - 1,359
Frank Whetter - 1,352
Alexander Chisholm - 1,146
Robert Agnew - 1,095

Ward 8 (East Toronto)
William Williamson - 1,747
William M. Miskelly - 1,548
Frederick Baker - 1,483
Walter Brown - 1,202
John Lennox - 766
Alfred Dunnett - 567
William Ford - 558

Results taken from the January 1, 1920 Toronto Daily Star and might not exactly match final tallies.
