= 1924 Toronto municipal election =

Municipal elections were held in Toronto, Ontario, Canada, on January 1, 1924. Wesley Hiltz was elected mayor defeating two prominent challengers.

== Toronto mayor ==
Incumbent mayor Charles A. Maguire had chosen to retire prior to the election. Three high-profile candidates attempted to succeed him. Tommy Church had served as mayor from 1915 to 1921, longer than any other person prior to him. Wesley Hiltz was chair of the Toronto Board of Education. Controller Joseph Singer had been nominated as a candidate for mayor but decided to withdraw in order not to split the anti-Tommy Church vote. Col. John Allister Currie was a leader of Canadian forces during the Boer War and a sitting Conservative Party MPP. Hiltz was victorious by a significant margin.

Results
Wesley Hiltz - 44,265
Tommy Church - 33,875
John Allister Currie - 4,312

== Board of Control ==
There were two new members of the Board of Control returned in this election: A.E. Hacker and R.H. Cameron.

Results
Joseph Gibbons (incumbent) - 42,778
Thomas Foster (incumbent) - 34,435
A.E. Hacker - 32,689
R.H. Cameron - 30,621
D.C. MacGregor - 26,637
William D. Robbins - 26,594
F.M. Johnston - 22,542
J.R. Beamish - 20,161

== City council ==
Ward 1 (Riverdale)
W.A. Summerville (incumbent) - 7,762
Robert Luxton (incumbent) - 5,129
George J. Smith - 5,082
L.W. Trull - 3,497
W.H. Fenwick - 2,803
C.H. Stock - 573

Ward 2 (Cabbagetown and Rosedale)
John Winnett - 4,295
Bert Wemp - 3,776
Charles A. Risk (incumbent) - 3,614
Herbert Henry Ball - 3,407
A.E. Brocklesby - 2,400
S.C. Parks - 1,873
J.N. Day - 694

Ward 3 (Central Business District and The Ward)
Frank Fenton - 4,522
Harry W. Hunt - 4,001
Andrew Carrick (incumbent) - 3,172
J. George Ramsden - 3,059
F.W. Johnston - 2,608
C.A. Reed - 2,062
W. Harper - 594

Ward 4 (Kensington Market and Garment District)
Sam McBride - 3,426
Nathan Phillips - 2,908
Claude Pearce (incumbent) - 2,728
E.B. Westwood - 2,190
L.A. Maldover - 1,999
C.W. Mogridge - 982
Sam Brown - 632
P.W. Benner - 399

Ward 5 (Trinity-Bellwoods)
Clifford Blackburn (incumbent) - 6,464
William James Stewart - 5,155
Benjamin Miller - 4,381
J. Phinnemore - 3,939
John Macdonald - 2,035
Arthur E. Fegan - 813

Ward 6 (Davenport and Parkdale)
Brook Sykes - 9,138
Samuel Thomas Wright - 7,849
John Laxton - 6,290
W.M. Maltby - 5,394
Guy Roach - 4,559
Richard Tuthill - 2,838
James Gill - 794

Ward 7 (West Toronto Junction)
Samuel Ryding (incumbent) - 3,743
Frank Whetter (incumbent) - 3,407
H.M Davy (incumbent) - 3,227
W.A. Baird - 3,157

Ward 8 (East Toronto)
Robert Baker (incumbent) - 5,886
Robert Dibble - 4,459
Joseph T. Turner - 3,781
J.H. Lennox - 2,591
William Robertston - 1,149
John Doggett - 1,135
C.G. Dawkes - 833

Results taken from the January 1, 1924 Toronto Daily Star and might not exactly match final tallies.
