= 1916 Toronto municipal election =

Canadian election

Municipal elections were held in Toronto, Ontario, Canada, on January 1, 1916. Mayor Tommy Church was elected to his second term in office.

== Toronto mayor ==
Church had first been elected mayor the year previous. In the words of the Toronto Daily Star the mayoral contest "was something of a joke" as Church was only opposed by Harry Winberg, who had never before held elected office. Church ignored his opponent during the campaign, and was easily returned.

Results
Tommy Church (incumbent) - 28,541
Harry Winberg - 9,880

== Board of Control ==
There was one change to the Board of Control. R.H. Cameron won a seat while Frank S. Spence was defeated.

Joseph Elijah Thompson (incumbent) -18,209
John O'Neill (incumbent) - 17,572
Thomas Foster (incumbent) - 16,085
R.H. Cameron - 15,391
James Simpson - 13,080
Frank S. Spence (incumbent) - 12,652
John Dunn - 11,009

== City council ==
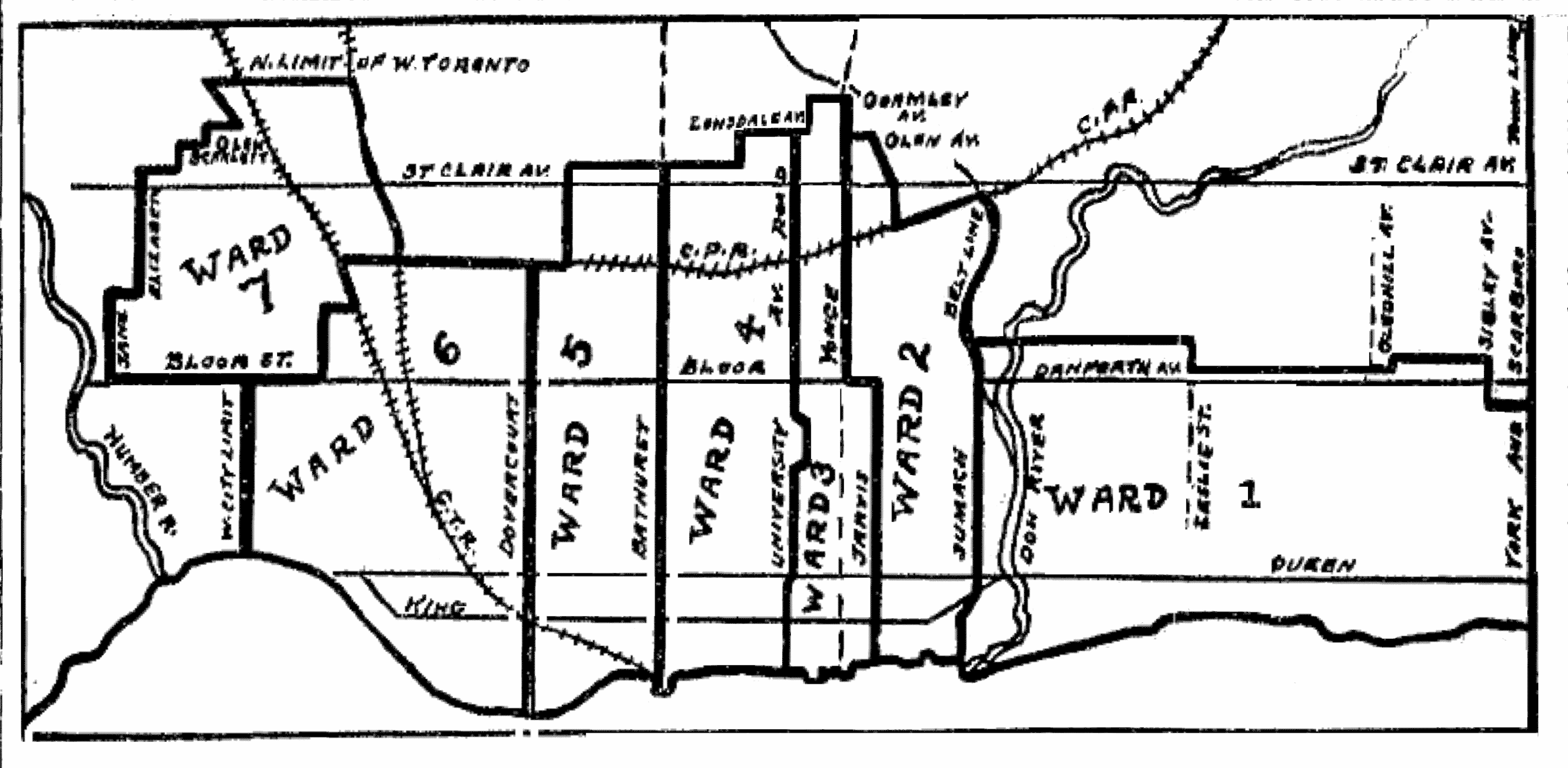
A map of Toronto's seven municipal wards as they existed for elections for elections from 1910 until 1918, inclusive. (Source: Toronto Daily Star, 18 December 1909)

Ward 1 (Riverdale)
William D. Robbins (incumbent) - 4,283
A.H. Wagstaff - 4,011
W. W. Hiltz - 3,657
Albert Walton (incumbent) - 2,866
Robert Yeomans (incumbent) - 2,590
Walter Brown - 913

Ward 2 (Cabbagetown and Rosedale)
Charles A. Risk (incumbent) - 2,550
J.R. Beamish - 2,499
Herbert Henry Ball (incumbent) - 2,093
Charles Beavis - 1,946
Thomas Barber - 729

Ward 3 (Central Business District and The Ward)
Charles A. Maguire (incumbent) - 3,397
J. George Ramsden (incumbent) - 2,154
Sam McBride (incumbent) - 1,971
Thomas Vance - 1,666

Ward 4 (Kensington Market and Garment District)
Arthur Russell Nesbitt - 2,652
John Cowan (incumbent) - 2,374
Louis Singer (incumbent) - 2,177
A.W. Miles - 1,954

Ward 5 (Trinity-Bellwoods)
Garnet Archibald - 2,808
R.H. Graham - 2,789
W.R. Plewman - 2,006
John Warren (incumbent) - 1,860
Joseph May - 1,571
John Wesley Meredith (incumbent) - 1,439
George Hagar - 1,373
James Thompson - 1,290
Alfred Moore - 388

Ward 6 (Brockton and Parkdale)
Fred McBrien - 4,512
Joseph Gibbons (incumbent) - 4,414
D.C. MacGregor - 4,006
George Birdsall - 3,890
Thomas Roden (incumbent) - 2,319

Ward 7 (West Toronto Junction)
Samuel Ryding (incumbent) - 1,420
Frank Whetter - 1,252
William Henry Weir (incumbent)- 1,106

Results taken from the January 1, 1916 Toronto Daily Star and might not exactly match final tallies.
