= 1917 Toronto municipal election =

Municipal election of Toronto

Municipal elections were held in Toronto, Ontario, Canada, on January 1, 1917. Mayor Tommy Church was acclaimed to his third consecutive term in office.

== Toronto mayor ==
Church had first been elected mayor in 1915. No one chose to run against him and he won by acclamation.

Results
Tommy Church (incumbent) - acclaimed

== Board of Control ==
Three incumbent members of the Board of Control ran for reelection and were successful. Joseph Thompson retired to fight in the war, and his seat was filled by William Henry Shaw.

R.H. Cameron (incumbent) - 15,615
John O'Neill (incumbent) - 15,141
Thomas Foster (incumbent) - 13,939
William Henry Shaw - 11,967
James Simpson - 10,779
Sam McBride - 10,085
Frank S. Spence - 9,281

== City council ==
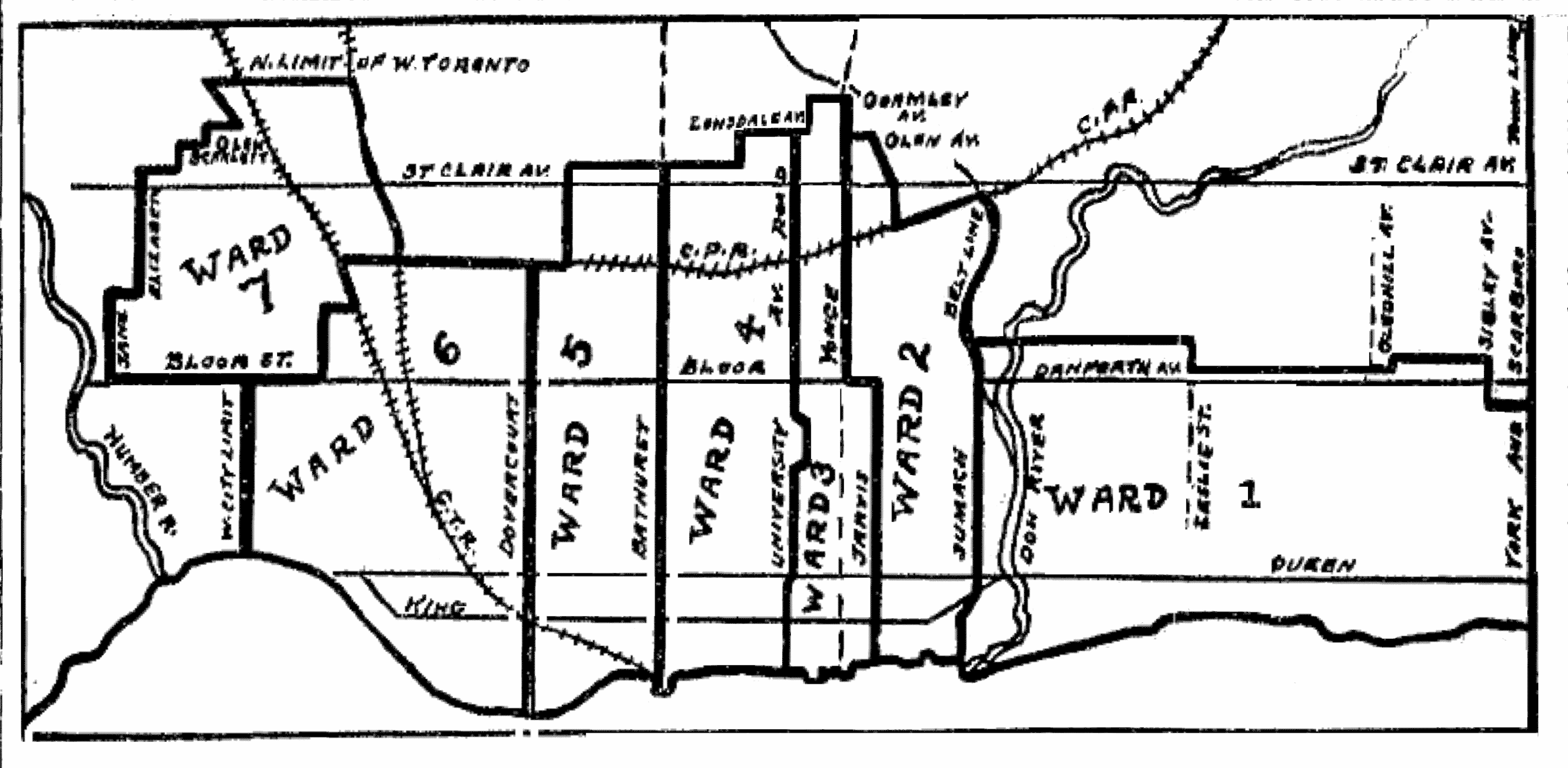
A map of Toronto's seven municipal wards as they existed for elections for elections from 1910 until 1918, inclusive. (Source: Toronto Daily Star, 18 December 1909)

Ward 1 (Riverdale)
William D. Robbins (incumbent) - 4,858
W. W. Hiltz (incumbent) - 4,201
William Fenwick - 3,778
A.H. Wagstaff (incumbent) - 2,301
Walter Brown - 1,961

Ward 2 (Cabbagetown and Rosedale)
Herbert Henry Ball (incumbent) - 2,472
J.R. Beamish (incumbent) - 2,472
Charles A. Risk (incumbent) - 2,186
O'Leary - 1,484

Ward 3 (Central Business District and The Ward)
Charles A. Maguire (incumbent) - 2,924
J. George Ramsden (incumbent) - 1,991
Alfred Burgess - 1,900
Thomas Vance - 886

Ward 4 (Kensington Market and Garment District)
Arthur Russell Nesbitt (incumbent) - 2,218
John C. McMulkin - 2,180
Louis Singer (incumbent) - 1,840
John Cowan (incumbent) - 2,468

Ward 5 (Trinity-Bellwoods)
R.H. Graham (incumbent) - 3,188
Garnet Archibald (incumbent) - 3,187
John Dunn - 3,072
W.R. Plewman (incumbent) - 2,848

Ward 6 (Brockton and Parkdale)
Fred McBrien (incumbent) - acclaimed
Joseph Gibbons (incumbent) - acclaimed
D.C. MacGregor (incumbent) - acclaimed

Ward 7 (West Toronto Junction)
Samuel Ryding (incumbent) - acclaimed
Frank Whetter (incumbent) - acclaimed

Results taken from the January 1, 1917 Toronto Daily Star and might not exactly match final tallies.
