= 1915 Toronto municipal election =

Municipal elections were held in Toronto, Ontario, Canada, on January 1, 1915. Tommy Church was elected mayor defeating Jesse O. McCarthy.

== Toronto mayor ==
Incumbent mayor H.C. Hocken chose not to run for re-election. Two prominent members of the Board of Control ran to replace him: Tommy Church and Jesse O. McCarthy, with Church the victor. As with most races of the period, it was also a contest between the two newspapers with the Toronto Daily Star supporting McCarthy and the Toronto Telegram supporting Church.

Results
Tommy Church - 26,041
Jesse O. McCarthy - 19,573

== Board of Control ==
The decision of both Church and McCarthy to run for mayor opened two vacancies on the Board of Control. A third opening was created by the defeat of labour leader James Simpson, who had been elected to the Board the year before. The spots were filled by Thomas Foster, Frank S. Spence, and Joseph Elijah Thompson.

John O'Neill (incumbent) - 20,751
Thomas Foster - 18,608
Frank S. Spence - 17,747
Joseph Elijah Thompson - 16,505
James Simpson (incumbent) - 16,349
Fred McBrien - 15,447
John Wanless - 13,044

== City council ==
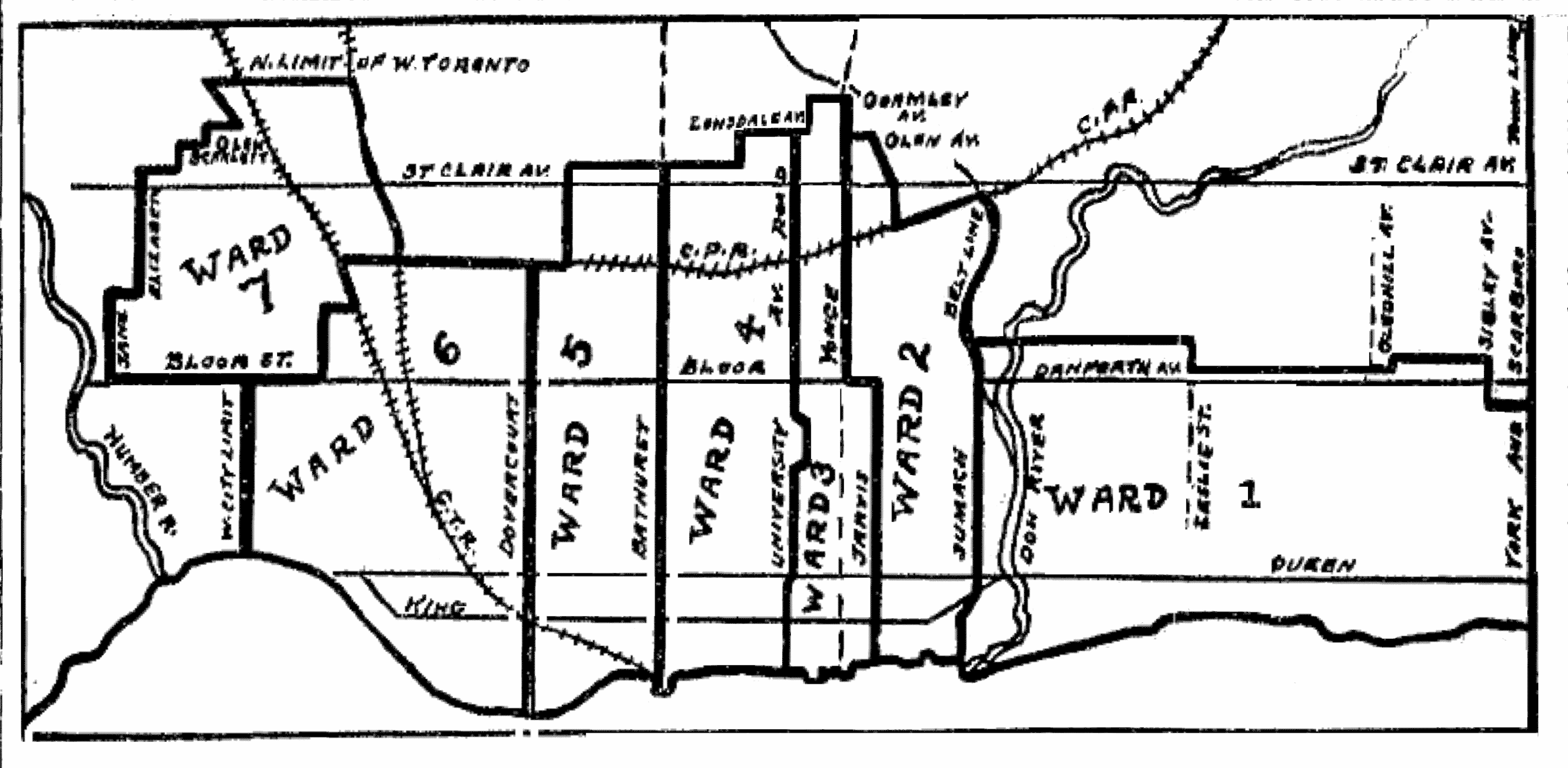
A map of Toronto's seven municipal wards as they existed for elections for elections from 1910 until 1918, inclusive. (Source: Toronto Daily Star, 18 December 1909)

Ward 1 (Riverdale)
William D. Robbins (incumbent) - 3,987
Albert Walton (incumbent) - 3,353
Robert Yeomans - 2,922
W. W. Hiltz (incumbent) - 2,900
A.H. Wagstaff - 2,754
William Orr - 1,700
George Smith - 1,148
George Daniels - 765
George Wellings - 325

Ward 2 (Cabbagetown and Rosedale)
Samuel Wickett (incumbent) - 3,028
Charles A. Risk (incumbent) - 2,586
Herbert Henry Ball - 2,134
Charles Beavis - 2,009
John Cooper - 1,789

Ward 3 (Central Business District and The Ward)
Charles A. Maguire (incumbent) - 4,356
Sam McBride (incumbent) - 3,993
J. George Ramsden - 2,107
John Skelton - 1,783
Albert Hassard - 884
Rudolph Paulich - 150

Ward 4 (Kensington Market and Garment District)
R.H. Cameron (incumbent) - 3,286
Louis Singer (incumbent) - 2,865
John Cowan - 2,339
Robert McLeod - 1,673
Henry Dworkin - 1,281

Ward 5 (Trinity-Bellwoods)
John Dunn (incumbent) - 6,298
John Warren - 3,578
John Wesley Meredith (incumbent) - 3,498
Joseph May - 3,138
Alfred Moore - 964

Ward 6 (Brockton and Parkdale)
David Spence (incumbent) - 5,727
Thomas Roden - 2,319
Joseph Gibbons - 3,724
George Birdsall - 2,524
D.C. MacGregor - 2,198
Albert Chamberlain - 1,491
Arthur Atkinson - 819
John Brown - 538
Kenneth McKenzie - 544
Richard Holmes - 417
George Pettit - 304

Ward 7 (West Toronto Junction)
Samuel Ryding (incumbent) - 1,218
William Henry Weir - 1,141
Frank Whetter (incumbent) - 1,026
Alexander Chisholm - 400
Maxwell Armstrong - 292

Results taken from the January 2, 1915 Toronto Daily Star and might not exactly match final tallies.

== Vacancy ==
Ward 2 Alderman Samuel Wickett dies December 7, 1915 and is not replaced.
