= 1914 Toronto municipal election =

Canadian election

Municipal elections were held in Toronto, Ontario, Canada, on January 1, 1914. H.C. Hocken was reelected mayor defeating Fred McBrien. The election was also notable for the victory of Louis Singer, the first representative of Toronto's large Jewish community elected to city council.

== Toronto mayor ==
Hocken had been mayor since 1912, as a founder of the Toronto Daily Star he was strongly supported by that newspaper and opposed by its rival the Toronto Telegram. In the 1914 election the Telegram supported Alderman McBrien, but Hocken won by a significant margin. Two other candidates ran, but received little support: Alderman Alfred Burgess and Birks.

Results
H.C. Hocken (incumbent) - 21,218
Fred McBrien - 16,641
Alfred Burgess - 3,725
James Birks - 1,511

== Board of Control ==
The Board of Control election was also a victory for the Star. Most notably labour leader James Simpson was elected at the top of the poll while incumbent Telegram favourite Thomas Foster was defeated.

James Simpson - 20,695
J.O. McCarthy (incumbent) - 17,490
Tommy Church (incumbent) - 17,085
John O'Neill (incumbent) - 14,597
Joseph Elijah Thompson - 14,233
Thomas Foster (incumbent) - 13,929
Robert Yeomans - 11,708
A. J. H. Eckardt - 7,755

== City council ==
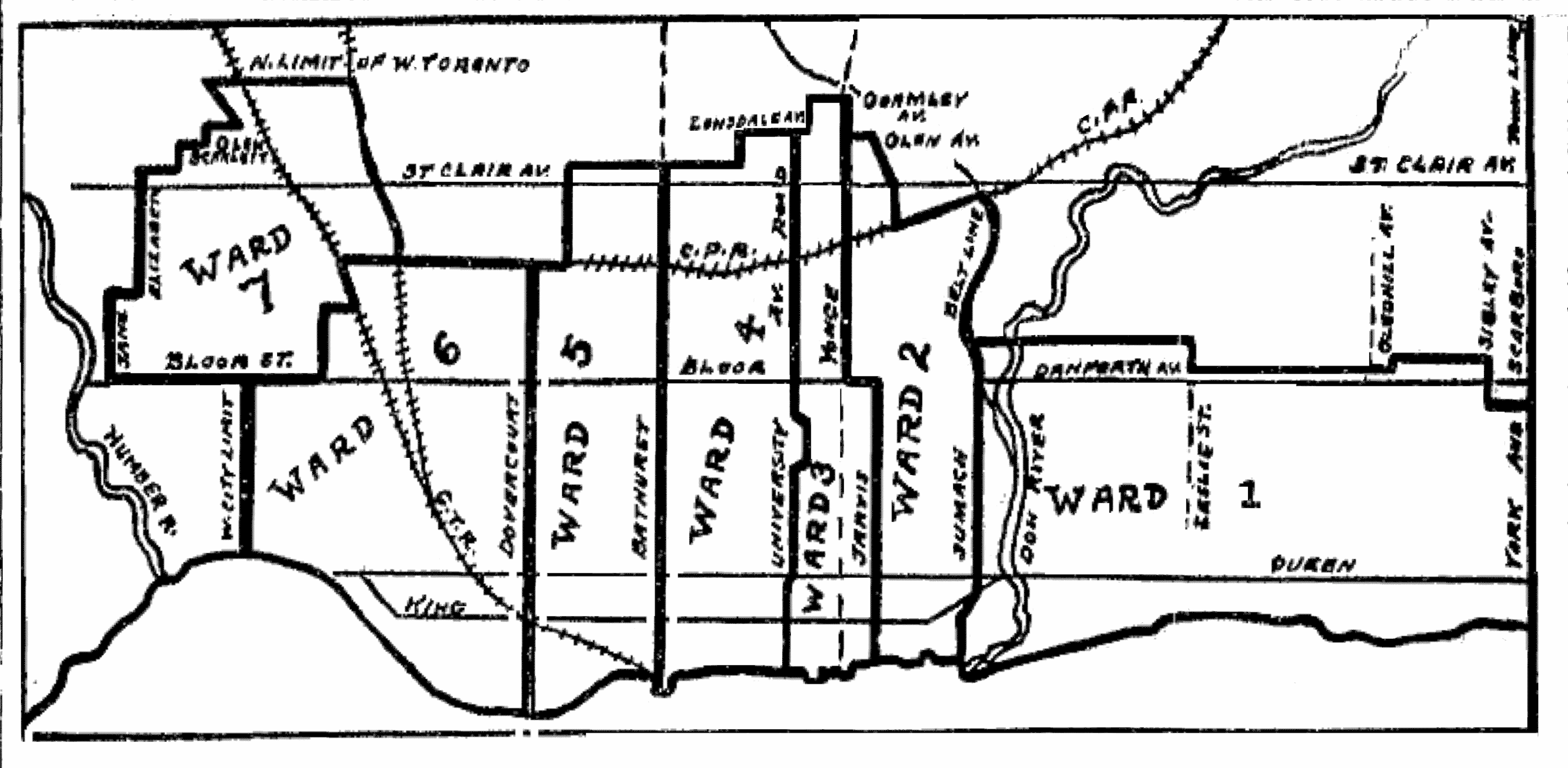
A map of Toronto's seven municipal wards as they existed for elections for elections from 1910 until 1918, inclusive. (Source: Toronto Daily Star, 18 December 1909)

Ward 1 (Riverdale)
William D. Robbins (incumbent) - acclaimed
Albert Walton (incumbent) - acclaimed
W. W. Hiltz - acclaimed

Ward 2 (Cabbagetown and Rosedale)
H.A. Rowland (incumbent) - 3,732
Samuel Wickett (incumbent) - 2,267
Charles A. Risk (incumbent) - 2,813
James Lindala - 866

Ward 3 (Central Business District and The Ward)
Charles A. Maguire - 4,245
F.S. Spence - 2,918
Sam McBride (incumbent) - 2,806
Marmaduke Rawlinson (incumbent) - 2,770
G.J. Castle - 809
Rudolph Paulich - 135

Ward 4 (Kensington Market and Garment District)
J. Wanless (incumbent) - 2,667
R.H. Cameron - 2,101
Louis Singer - 1,842
A.B. Farmer - 1,571
Robert McLeod - 1,308
A.E. Hacker - 1,002
A.R. Williamson - 995
G.R. Sweeny - 906
Harry Winberg - 240
G.H. Pettit - 211

Ward 5 (Trinity-Bellwoods)
John Dunn (incumbent) - 3,087
R.H. Graham - 3,076
John Wesley Meredith (incumbent) - 3,023
Joseph May (incumbent) - 2,754
G.S.C. Garrett - 2,416
R.W. Dockeray - 2,115
Alfred Moore - 452

Ward 6 (Brockton and Parkdale)
David Spence (incumbent) - 5,822
C.H. Maybee (incumbent) - 5,200
W.H. Smith - 4,847
T.J. Ryan - 2,669
S.H. Hurst - 1,472
Richard Holmes - 592
W.H. Stevens - 343

Ward 7 (West Toronto Junction)
Frank Whetter - 750
Samuel Ryding (incumbent) - 678
J.G. Wright - 539
W.J. Dalton - 525
Alexander Chisholm - 390
William Henry Weir - 294
Maxwell Armstrong - 164
A.M. Wilson - 166
J.A. Macdonald - 120
J.C. McClelland - 82

Results taken from the January 2, 1914 Toronto Daily Star and might not exactly match final tallies.
