= 1925 Toronto municipal election =

Municipal elections were held in Toronto, Ontario, Canada, on January 1, 1925. Thomas Foster was elected mayor ousting incumbent Wesley Hiltz. The election included a referendum where voters passed a motion in favour of building a new water plant. This eventually became the R. C. Harris Water Treatment Plant.

== Toronto mayor ==
Hilz had been elected to office the year previously. he was challenged for the mayoralty by long serving politician Thomas Foster. Foster won by a narrow margin in what was a very low turnout election. Two fringe candidates with no previous elected office also ran.

Results
Thomas Foster - 32,885
Wesley Hiltz - 31,408
Harry Winberg - 2,263
Samuel Fieldhouse - 282

== Board of Control ==
There were two new members of the Board of Control returned in this election: D.C. MacGregor and labour leader William D. Robbins. Defeated was R.H. Cameron, a close ally of the mayor.

Results
Joseph Gibbons (incumbent) - 39,299
A.E. Hacker (incumbent) - 34,369
William D. Robbins - 33,172
D.C. MacGregor - 30,326
R.H. Cameron (incumbent) - 29,086
James Simpson - 14,573
James Birks - 4,321

== City council ==
Ward 1 (Riverdale)
Robert Luxton (incumbent) - acclaimed
George J. Smith (incumbent) - acclaimed
W.A. Summerville (incumbent) - acclaimed

Ward 2 (Cabbagetown and Rosedale)
Bert Wemp (incumbent) - 4,059
John Winnett (incumbent) - 3,482
Charles A. Risk (incumbent) - 3,293
Herbert Henry Ball - 2,913
A.E. Brocklesby - 3,301

Ward 3 (Central Business District and The Ward)
Harry W. Hunt (incumbent) - 3,458
J. George Ramsden - 2,974
Joseph Singer - 2,685
Andrew Carrick (incumbent) - 2,476
John Boland - 1,887
John R. Beamish - 1,790
Charles Mogrdige - 613

Ward 4 (Kensington Market and Garment District)
Nathan Phillips (incumbent) - 3,282
Sam McBride (incumbent) - 2,889
Claude Pearce (incumbent) - 2,827
Ian Macdonnell - 2,479
James Muldowney - 516

Ward 5 (Trinity-Bellwoods)
Clifford Blackburn (incumbent) - 5,262
Benjamin Miller (incumbent) - 3,934
William James Stewart (incumbent) - 3,703
Wesley Benson - 2,567
Sumner Graham - 2,280
John Macdonald - 1,349
Arthur E. Fegan - 754

Ward 6 (Davenport and Parkdale)
Brook Sykes (incumbent) - 8,477
Samuel Thomas Wright (incumbent) - 7,488
John Laxton (incumbent) - 5,676
Guy Roach - 4,716
Richard Tuthill - 2,318
James Gill - 825

Ward 7 (West Toronto Junction)
Samuel Ryding (incumbent) - 3,646
Frank Whetter (incumbent) - 3,385
W.A. Baird - 3,303
Robert Hall - 398
James Morrow -375

Ward 8 (East Toronto)
Robert Dibble (incumbent) - 5,846
Robert Baker (incumbent) - 5,427
William Robertston - 3,993
Joseph Turner (incumbent) - 3,867
Florence Custance - 819

Results taken from the January 1, 1925 Toronto Daily Star and might not exactly match final tallies.
