= 1926 Toronto municipal election =

Canadian elections

Municipal elections were held in Toronto, Ontario, Canada, on January 1, 1926. Thomas Foster was reelected mayor.

== Toronto mayor ==
Thomas Foster had first been elected to city council in 1891 and was running for his second consecutive term as mayor. He was opposed by former Controller R.H. Cameron, but won easy reelection. The central issue was whether the suburban radial lines, such as the Toronto and York Radial Railway, should be taken away from Toronto Hydro and merged into the Toronto Transportation Commission. While Cameron, the main advocate of the position, lost the election the policy was enacted in 1927.

Results
Thomas Foster - 47,771
R.H. Cameron - 38,045
Samuel Fieldhouse - 916

== Board of Control ==
There was one change in the membership of the Board of Control. Alderman Sam McBride made his first run for the Board and finished second. This pushed William D. Robbins into fifth and off the board.

Results
Joseph Gibbons (incumbent) - 37,608
Sam McBride - 36,211
A.E. Hacker (incumbent) - 31,427
D.C. MacGregor (incumbent) - 30,975
William D. Robbins (incumbent) - 30,320
William C. McBrien - 29,923
Bert Wemp - 28,024
Frank Whetter - 21,722
W.E. Hamilton - 2,590

== City council ==
Ward 1 (Riverdale)
W.A. Summerville (incumbent) - 6,359
George J. Smith (incumbent) - 6,252
Robert Luxton (incumbent) - 5,158
Richard Honeyford - 4,179
Robert Allen - 2,548

Ward 2 (Cabbagetown and Rosedale)
John Winnett (incumbent) - 5,857
Charles A. Risk (incumbent) - 5,606
John R. Beamish - 5,501
Charles Reed - 3,753

Ward 3 (Central Business District and The Ward)
Harry W. Hunt (incumbent) - 5,463
J. George Ramsden (incumbent) - 4,785
Andrew Carrick - 4,262
William Beaton - 3,716
Wallace Kennedy - 1,916

Ward 4 (Kensington Market and Garment District)
Ian Macdonnell - 4,588
Nathan Phillips (incumbent) - 4,292
Samuel Factor - 2,570
William Hevey - 2,577
John Young - 811

Ward 5 (Trinity-Bellwoods)
Clifford Blackburn (incumbent) - 6,539
William James Stewart (incumbent) - 6,125
Benjamin Miller (incumbent) - 5,191
Phinnemore - 3,407
John Macdonald - 1,596

Ward 6 (Davenport and Parkdale)
Samuel Thomas Wright (incumbent) - 8,951
John Laxton (incumbent) - 6,791
John Boland - 6,312
William Willard - 5,121
William Maltby - 4,712
Richard Tuthill - 3,028
James Black - 829
James Muldowney - 667

Ward 7 (West Toronto Junction)
W.A. Baird (incumbent) - 4,451
Samuel Ryding (incumbent) - 4,283
William C. Davidson - 3,989
Alexander Chisholm - 3,219
Hall - 398
Barnetson - 252

Ward 8 (East Toronto)
Robert Baker (incumbent) - 6,900
Walter Howell - 5,587
Robert Dibble (incumbent) - 5,587
William Robertston (incumbent) - 4,994
Joseph Turner - 2,779
Isaac Pimblett - 2,195
Albert Burnese - 3,348

Results taken from the January 2, 1926 Toronto Daily Star and might not exactly match final tallies.
