= 1929 Toronto municipal election =

Municipal elections were held in Toronto, Ontario, Canada, on January 1, 1929. Sam McBride, who had been elected the year previous, was reelected mayor defeating former Alderman Brook Sykes by a large margin.

== Toronto mayor ==
The central issue of the campaign was a plan to extend University Avenue south to connect to Front Street. McBride supported the plan, with Sykes opposing it due to the expense of buying a demolishing a large number of buildings.

Results
Sam McBride - 47,931
Brook Sykes - 30,329

== Board of Control ==
There was only one change in the membership of the Board of Control. William D. Robbins lost his seat while W.A. Summerville gained one. This result was later overturned when it was discovered that Summerville was in arrears on his municipal taxes, and thus ineligible to hold office. He was not allowed to take his seat on the board, and a by-election was called for February. Summerville paid his taxes, and was then eligible to run. He won the by-election by a considerable margin, once again besting Cameron, Pearce, and Robbins.

Results
Bert Wemp (incumbent) - 43,464
Joseph Gibbons (incumbent) - 32,734
W.A. Summerville - 30,292
A.E. Hacker (incumbent) - 28,667
R.H. Cameron - 27,266
Claude Pearce - 27,245
William D. Robbins (incumbent) - 23,796
James Simpson - 12,816

== City council ==
Ward 1 (Riverdale)
Robert Siberry (incumbent) - 7,283
Robert Allen - 5,180
Frank M. Johnston - 5,128
Robert Luxton (incumbent) - 5,097

Ward 2 (Cabbagetown and Rosedale)
John R. Beamish (incumbent) - acclaimed
John Winnett (incumbent) - acclaimed
James Cameron (incumbent) - acclaimed

Ward 3 (Central Business District and The Ward)
Harry W. Hunt (incumbent) - 3,562
Andrew Carrick (incumbent) - 4,286
Percy Quinn (incumbent) - 3,557
Hodgson - 2,103
Wallace Kennedy - 1,266

Ward 4 (Kensington Market and Garment District)
Nathan Phillips (incumbent) - 3,557
Joseph Gordon (incumbent) - 2,477
Samuel Factor - 2,420
Charles Ward - 2,169
John McMulkin - 3,086
Saunders - 2,033
Reuben Rodness - 342

Ward 5 (Trinity-Bellwoods)
William James Stewart (incumbent) - 5,015
Wesley Benson (incumbent) - 4,203
Fred Hamilton - 5,035
Clifford Blackburn (incumbent) - 3,523
Robert Leslie - 2,875
Mary McNab - 1,154
MacDonald - 939

Ward 6 (Davenport and Parkdale)
Joseph Wright (incumbent) - 9,122
John Laxton (incumbent) - 6,614
John Boland (incumbent) - 6,281
D.C. MacGregor - 5,421
Tuthill - 2,048
Robinson - 1,110
James Gill - 912

Ward 7 (West Toronto Junction)
William J. Wadsworth (incumbent) - 4,199
Frank Whetter (incumbent) - 3,785
Alexander Chisholm - 3,366
Samuel Ryding (incumbent) - 3,065

Ward 8 (East Toronto)
Walter Howell (incumbent) - 5,922
Robert Baker (incumbent) - 4,962
Albert Burnese - 4,283
Ernest Bray - 4,012
William Robertston - 2,820
Turner - 2,672

Results are taken from the January 2, 1929 Toronto Globe and may not exactly match final tallies.

== Changes ==
The Board of Control by-election was held February 23, 1929:

W.A. Summerville - 20,353
Claude Peace - 9,973
R.H. Cameron - 8,304
James Simpson - 2,411
William D. Robbins - 1,356
Thomas Foster - 1,057
John MacDonald - 539

Controller Joseph Gibbons resigned November 4, 1929 upon appointment as a Toronto Hydro Commissioner. Ward 7 Alderman Frank Whetter was appointed Controller on November 8; Samuel Ryding was appointed Alderman on November 12
