= 1912 Toronto municipal election =

Municipal elections in Toronto 1912

Municipal elections were held in Toronto, Ontario, Canada, on January 1, 1912. Mayor George Reginald Geary faced no opponents and was acclaimed for reelection.

== Toronto mayor ==
Mayor Geary had been elected mayor in 1910 and re-elected in 1911. No one chose to run against him and he was acclaimed. Part way through his term he would resign and be replaced by Horatio Clarence Hocken.

Results
George Reginald Geary (incumbent) - acclaimed

== Board of Control ==
Two incumbent members of the Board of Control were defeated. Noted Liberal and prohibitionist Frank S. Spence lost his seat, but he was replaced by fellow Liberal Jesse O. McCarthy. J.J. Ward, considered a representative of labour also lost his seat. The other new arrival was Thomas Foster who had lost his board the seat the year previous.

Horatio Clarence Hocken (incumbent) - 16,904
J.O. McCarthy - 14,897
Thomas Foster - 14,462
Tommy Church (incumbent) - 12,149
Frank S. Spence (incumbent) - 12,003
J.J. Ward (incumbent) - 11,735
J.G. O'Donoghue - 4,022
George R. Sweeny - 3,921

== City council ==
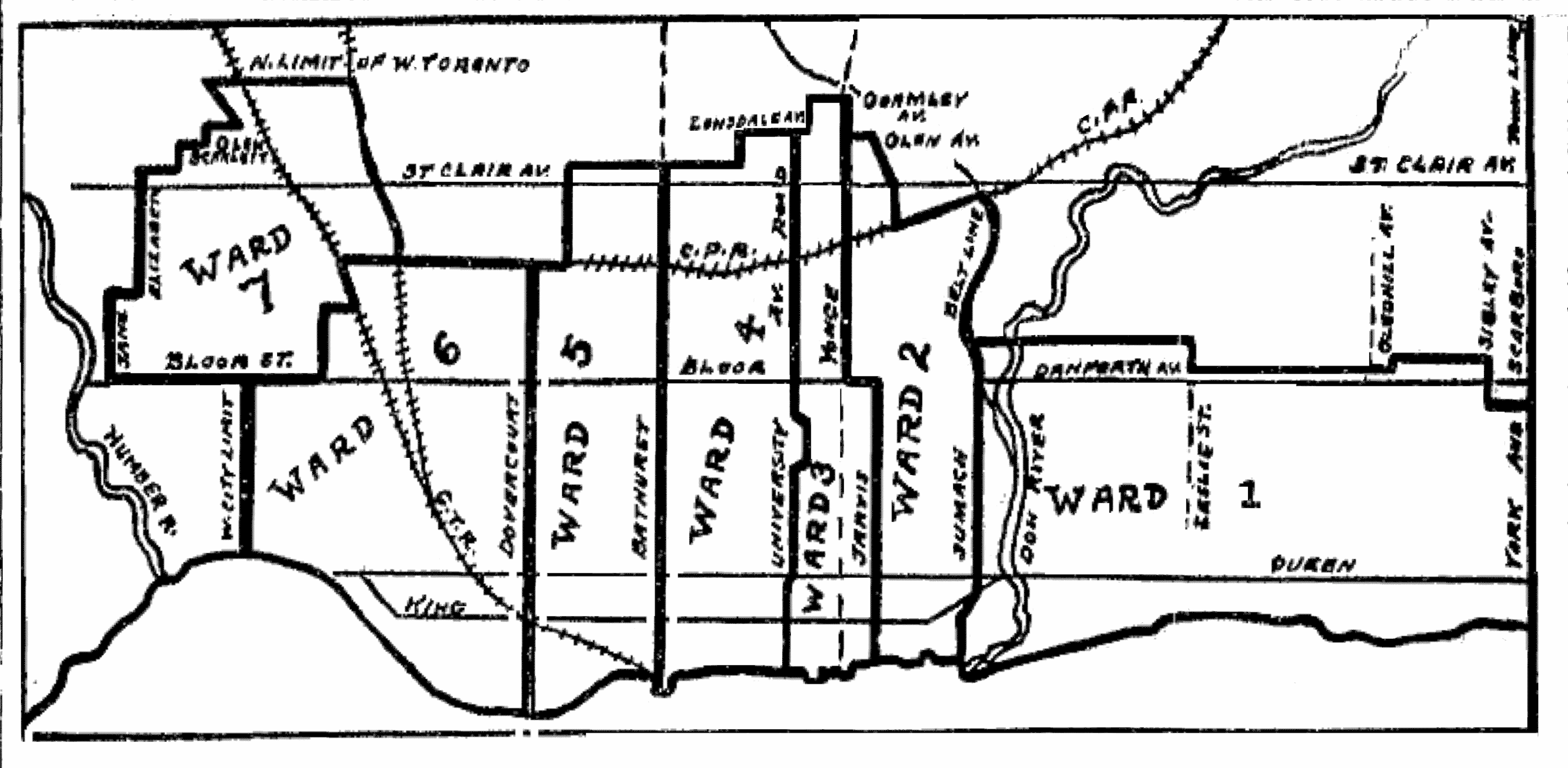
A map of Toronto's seven municipal wards as they existed for elections for elections from 1910 until 1918, inclusive. (Source: Toronto Daily Star, 18 December 1909)

Ward 1 (Riverdale)
Daniel Chisholm (incumbent) - 3,563
Zephaniah Hilton (incumbent) - 2,647
William J. Saunderson - 2,255
William D. Robbins - 2,245
Fred Gibbons - 884
Samuel Fieldhouse - 441
Ernest Cook - 390

Ward 2 (Cabbagetown and Rosedale)
John O'Neill (incumbent) - 2,922
H.A. Rowland (incumbent) - 2,642
Robert Yeomans (incumbent) - 2,071
Charles A. Risk - 1,845

Ward 3 (Central Business District and The Ward)
Charles A. Maguire (incumbent) - acclaimed
Marmaduke Rawlinson (incumbent) - acclaimed
Sam McBride - acclaimed

Ward 4 (Kensington Market and Garment District)
George Weston (incumbent) - 2,476
John Wanless - 2,427
George McMurrich (incumbent) - 1,931
James Commeford - 1,478
John Shayne - 1,172

Ward 5 (Trinity-Bellwoods)
John Dunn (incumbent) - 3,304
R.H. Graham (incumbent - 3,110
Joseph May (incumbent) - 3,091
John Wesley Meredith - 1,975
R.P. Powell - 1,412

Ward 6 (Brockton and Parkdale)
Fred McBrien (incumbent) - 4,633
David Spence - 4,446
John A. Austin - 2,489
Walter Mann - 1,335
H.M. Mulholland - 1,319
James Stewart - 942
William Hevey - 627
R.W. Holmes - 425
Thomas Earls - 224

Ward 7 (West Toronto Junction)
A.J. Anderson (incumbent) - 1090
Samuel Ryding - 876
W.A. Baird (incumbent) - 657
Noble Scott - 323

Results taken from the 2 January 1912 The Globe and might not exactly match final tallies.

== Changes ==
Ward 1 Alderman Daniel Chisholm resigns on July 23, 1912 in order to be appointed Civic Property Commissioner. A by-election was held August 17, 1912:

Ward 1 (Riverdale)
William D. Robbins - 1,151
Frank Britton: 224
Fred Gibbons - 120
Samuel Fieldhouse - 19

Mayor George Reginald Geary resigns October 21, 1912 to become Corporation Counsel; Controller Horatio Clarence Hocken is unanimously appointed Mayor. Ward 3 Alderman Charles A. Maguire is appointed to fill the Board of Control vacancy; the aldermanic seat is left vacant.
