= 1911 Toronto municipal election =

Municipal elections were held in Toronto, Ontario, Canada, on January 2, 1911. Mayor George Reginald Geary was easily reelected mayor. Four members of the Board of Control and seven councillors also were elected, through block voting and first past the post, respectively.

== Toronto mayor ==
Mayor George Reginald Geary had been elected mayor the year previous 1910. His only opposition were two candidates who had never before held elected office. Herbert Capewell, who finished second, had no intention of winning and declared his campaign a protest against the city taking over public transit in the city from private companies.

Results
George Reginald Geary (incumbent) - 30,931
Herbert Capewell - 2,671
Robert Buist Noble - 530

== Board of Control ==
There was one change to the Board of Control as Toronto Daily Star founder Horatio Clarence Hocken won a seat at the expense of incumbent Thomas Foster.

Horatio Clarence Hocken - 22,761
Frank S. Spence (incumbent) - 16,187
J.J. Ward (incumbent) - 15,999
Tommy Church (incumbent) - 15,760
Thomas Foster (incumbent) - 15,540
Thomas Davies - 3,285

== City council ==
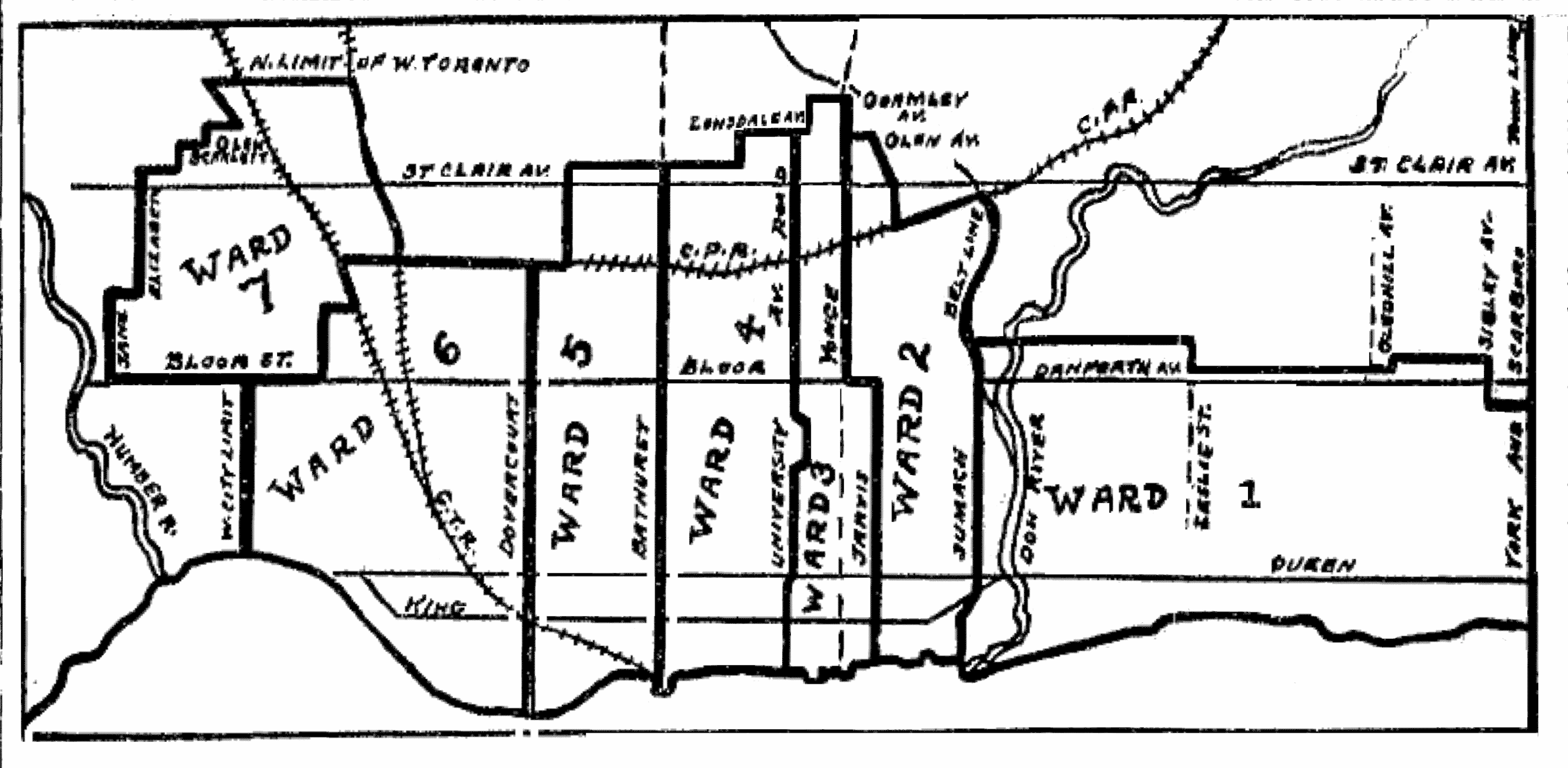
A map of Toronto's seven municipal wards as they existed for elections for elections from 1910 until 1918, inclusive. (Source: Toronto Daily Star, 18 December 1909)

Ward 1 (Riverdale)
Daniel Chisholm (incumbent) - 3,627
Zephaniah Hilton (incumbent) - 3,292
Thomas N. Phelan (incumbent) - 3,200
William J. Saunderson - 2,722
Samuel Fieldhouse - 386

Ward 2 (Cabbagetown and Rosedale)
John O'Neill (incumbent) - 2,741
Henry Adams Rowland (incumbent) - 2,472
Robert Yeomans - 1,394
Charles A. Risk - 1,376
J.W. Siddall - 1,072

Ward 3 (Central Business District and The Ward)
Charles A. Maguire (incumbent) - 3,436
Norman Heyd (incumbent) - 2,580
Marmaduke Rawlinson - 2,559
Sam McBride (incumbent) - 2,530
John Kirk - 780

Ward 4 (Kensington Market and Garment District)
George R. Sweeny - 3,146
George McMurrich (incumbent) - 3,064
George Weston (incumbent) - 2,814
James Commeford - 2,452

Ward 5 (Trinity-Bellwoods)
Joseph May (incumbent) - 3,428
John Dunn (incumbent) - 3,422
R.H. Graham (incumbent) - 3,224
R.W. Dockeray - 2,777

Ward 6 (Brockton and Parkdale)
J.O. McCarthy (incumbent) - 3,724
James Arthur McCausland (incumbent) - 3,712
Fred McBrien - 3,697
David Spence (incumbent) - 3,561

Ward 7 (West Toronto Junction)
A.J. Anderson (incumbent) - 1,452
W.A. Baird (incumbent) - 966
Edward Wakefield - 452

Results taken from the January 3, 1911 Toronto Globe and might not exactly match final tallies.
