= Toronto Board of Control =

Former part of municipal government of Toronto, Canada

The Board of Control of Toronto, Ontario, Canada, was a part of its municipal government until it was abolished in 1969. It served as the executive committee of the Toronto City Council. When it was initially created in 1896 by mandate of the provincial government, it consisted of three Controllers appointed from and by the aldermen, and presided over by the Mayor of Toronto. Beginning in 1904, the Board of Control was directly elected by the city's electorate using cumulative voting and consisted of four Controllers, presided over by the Mayor. Each voter could cast up to four votes, which could go four candidates or be lumped on one candidate. The four with the most votes were elected. By tradition the controller who received the most votes was given the powerful budget chief position.

== Functions ==
Under the Municipal Act, the Board of Control had the following duties and powers:

1. the preparation and certification of all estimates for expenditures
2. the preparation of specifications for tenders, and making awards thereon
3. the nomination to council of all heads of departments and related staff, and the recommendation of appropriate salaries
4. the inspection and reporting (at least monthly) on all municipal works carried on or in progress
5. the submission of by-laws to the council
6. the authority to amalgamate departments and sub-departments
7. other powers as the council has delegated by-law or resolution

With respect to the first three items, the board's actions could only be overturned by a two-thirds vote of the council.

== History ==
From 1896 until 1904, the Toronto Board of Control was an executive branch of Council, chaired by the Mayor. It handled all daily business of Council and reported to Council.

In the early 20th century, elected Boards of Control were introduced as a reform measure for all cities in Ontario. The board was designed to be the equivalent of a cabinet for municipal governments. It had certain specific duties such as issuing tenders and appointing department heads. In Toronto it often did not function as such. Since the controllers were elected separately from the mayor, there was no guarantee they would be allied. Moreover, since controller candidates contested citywide elections they were often seen as the natural contenders for the mayoralty and as challengers to the incumbent mayor. Many controllers thus had a self-interest in blocking the mayor from succeeding. Relations between the Board of Control and council were also sometimes difficult, with the Board often acting as an independent council at odds with the larger body.

In 1961 the provincial government allowed cities with more than 100,000 people to abolish the Board of Control. Toronto City Council voted to do so in December 1968 after a long debate. Mayor William Dennison and three of the sitting controllers opposed the move, but it was passed by a significant majority of council.

The Board of Control was replaced with a new executive committee that was composed of and elected by city council members. The size of city council was expanded by four to retain the same overall number of councillors.

William Peyton Hubbard, the son of U.S. slaves who had escaped to Canada through the Underground Railroad, was elected to the first Board of Control in 1904 and served for four terms - he would be the only Black person or person of colour to sit on the body;

Joseph Singer became the first Jewish candidate to win citywide office in 1923;

Jean Newman was the first woman elected to the Board and served from 1957 to 1960.

== City of Toronto Controllers ==
Names in boldface indicate Controllers that became Mayor of Toronto in other years. Names in italics are individuals who only sat on the Board of Control as mayor.

X = elected as Controller
M = sitting as Mayor
B = elected as Controller in a by-election
A = appointed Controller to fill a vacancy

=== From 1896 to 1903 ===
Municipal Boards of Control were created by the provincial government as a reform measure. From 1896 to 1903 the Toronto Board of Control was appointed by vote of Toronto City Council from among its own members and acted as an executive committee or municipal cabinet. Controllers were chosen at the first council meeting in January after the annual municipal election. Three Controllers sat on the Board, in addition to the Mayor, until 1901 when the number of Controllers was increased to four.

Appointments to the Board of Control for the City of Toronto (1896-1903)
Controller	1896	1897	1898	1899	1900	1901	1902	1903
William Burns			A	A				A
James Crane							A	
**Robert Fleming***	M	M						
James Frame					A	A		
John James Graham	A	A					A	
**Oliver Aiken Howland**						M	M	
William Peyton Hubbard			A			A		
Daniel Lamb	A	A				A		
John Leslie		A	A					
John Francis Loudon							A	A
Adam Lynd				A				
**Ernest A. Macdonald**					M			
George McMurrich	A						A	
**Joseph Oliver**								A
Fred H. Richardson								A
**John Shaw***		M	M	M				
Oliver Barton Sheppard					A	A		
Francis Stephens Spence					A			
**Thomas Urquhart**								M
Francis H. Woods				A				

*Fleming resigned as mayor on August 6, 1897. Council elected Shaw to complete his term.

=== From 1904 to 1929 ===
Originally, the Board of Control was appointed by the city council. In 1903, the Ontario legislature passed a law requiring municipal boards of control to be chosen through direct election by the municipality's voters. This requirement became effective in Toronto with the 1904 municipal election. Cumulative voting was brought in to elect the Board, starting in 1904.

Elections to the Board of Control for the City of Toronto (1904-1929)
Controller	1904	1905	1906	1907	1908	1909	1910	1911	1912	1913	1914	1915	1916	1917	1918	1919	1920	1921	1922	1923	1924	1925	1926	1927	1928	1929
R.H. Cameron													X	X		X	X				X					
**Emerson Coatsworth**			M	M																						
**Tommy Church**							X	X	X	X	X	M	M	M	M	M	M	M								
**Thomas Foster**							X		X	X		X	X	X					X	X	X	M	M	M		
**George Reginald Geary**						X	M	M	M																	
Joseph Gibbons																	X	X	X	X	X	X	X	X	X	X
Albert Hacker																					X	X	X	X	X	X
William Spence Harrison				X	X	X																				
**Wesley Hiltz**																		X	X	X	M					
**Horatio Clarence Hocken**				X	X	X		X	X	M	M															
William Peyton Hubbard	X	X	X	X																						
S. Alfred Jones			X																							
John F. Loudon	X																									
**Charles A. Maguire**															X	X	X	X	M	M						
**Sam McBride**															X	X							X		M	M
J.O. McCarthy									X	X	X															
D.C. MacGregor																						X	X	X		
John O'Neill										X	X	X	X	X	X											
A.R. Nesbitt																		X	X							
**Joseph Oliver**					M	M																				
J. George Ramsden																	X									
Fred H. Richardson*	X																									
**William D. Robbins**															X	X						X			X	
**John Shaw***	B	X	X																							
William Henry Shaw														X												
**James Simpson**											X															
Joseph Singer																				X						
Francis Stephens Spence	X	X			X		X	X				X														
W.A. Summerville																										X
Joseph Elijah Thompson												X	X													
**Thomas Urquhart**	M	M																								
John J. Ward		X	X	X	X	X	X	X																		
**Bert Wemp**																								X	X	X

* Richardson resigned after his election agent was charged with bribery. Shaw was elected to replace him in a by-election.

=== 1930s and 1940s ===
Elections to the Board of Control for the City of Toronto (1930-1949)
Controller	1930	1931	1932	1933	1934	1935	Jan 1936	Dec 1936	1937	1939	1940	1941	1942	1943	1944	1945	1946	1947	1948	1949
David Balfour															X	X	X	X	X	X
**Frederick J. Conboy**								X	X	X	X	M	M	M	M					
**Ralph Day**						X	X	X	M	M	M									
Lewis Duncan												X	X	X						
Albert Hacker		X																		
Fred Hamilton								X	X	X	X	X	X	X	X					
John Innes																		X	X	X
**Allan Lamport**																				X
**Sam McBride**			X	X	X	X	M													
**Hiram E. McCallum**																X	X	X	X	M
Kenneth Bert McKellar																	X	X	X	
Douglas McNish									X	X	X									
Claude Pearce	X																			
J. George Ramsden		X	X	X	X		X													
**William D. Robbins**	X	X	X	X	X	X	X	M												
**Leslie Saunders**																				X
**Robert Hood Saunders**												X	X	X	X	M	M	M	M	
**James Simpson**	X	X	X	X	X	M														
Stewart Smith																X	X			
**William James Stewart**		M	M	M	M															
W.A. Summerville	X																			
William J. Wadsworth						X	X	X	X	X	X	X	X	X	X	X				
**Bert Wemp**	M																			

=== From 1950 to abolition ===
With the formation of Metropolitan Toronto in April 1953, the two most senior controllers, in terms of votes at the municipal election, also sat on Metropolitan Toronto Council along with the Mayor of Toronto, the senior alderman from each of Toronto's nine wards, and mayors and reeves elected from the suburbs.

Elections to the Board of Control for the City of Toronto (1950-1966)
Controller	Jan 1950	Dec 1950	1951	1952	1953	1954	1955	1956	1958	1960	1962	1964	1966
William Allen							X	X	X	X			
William Archer*											A	X	
David Balfour	X	X	X	X	X	X							
Roy E. Belyea**					A	X							
Ford Brand			X	X	X	X	X	X					
Margaret Campbell												X	X
Joseph Cornish						X	X	X					
**William Dennison**									X	X	X	X	M
**Philip Givens***										X	X/M	M	
John Innes	X	X											
**Allan Lamport*****	X		M	M	M						X		X
Ross Lipsett ***					A								
June Marks													X
**Hiram E. McCallum**	M	M											
Jean Newman								X	X				
Herbert Orliffe											X	X	X
**Nathan Phillips**						M	M	M	M	M			
**Leslie Saunders*****	X	X	X	X	X/M		X						
Louis Shannon**		X	X	X	X								
**Donald Summerville***									X	X	M		

* Mayor Summerville died in office, Givens was appointed mayor in his place. Archer was appointed to the Board of Control to fill the vacancy.

** In 1954, Controller Shannon died and Ward 9 Alderman Roy E. Belyea was appointed in his place.

*** Mayor Lamport resigned as mayor to become vice-chairman of the Toronto Transit Commission, Saunders was appointed mayor in his place and Ward 8 Alderman Ross Lipsett was appointed to the Board of Control to fill the vacancy.

== Election results ==
1966
Margaret Campbell - 88,036
June Marks - 77,655
Herbert Orliffe - 76,412
Allan Lamport - 67,677
George Ben - 63,206
Joseph Piccininni - 58,122
Phyllis Clarke - 10,162
Arthur Young - 9,550
John Charles Ewing - 6,071
Dorothy Cureatz - 4,262
Shaba Musa - 2,399

1964
William Dennison - 68,892
Herbert Orliffe - 66,280
William Archer - 65,593
Margaret Campbell - 60,900
George Ben - 59,751
Richard Horkins - 47,906
Harry Bradley - 12,949
Phyllis Clarke - 10,284
Fred Graham - 9,673
Patricia Mitchell - 6,750

1962
Philip Givens - 88,629
Allan Lamport - 84,902
William Dennison - 76,504
Herbert Orliffe - 73,118
Margaret Campbell - 72,108
Ken Waters - 62,019
Phyllis Clarke - 16,151
Frederick Graham - 10,475
Dorothy Cureatz - 6,752

1960
Donald Summerville - 110,893
William Allen - 110,256
William Dennison - 76,169
Philip Givens - 66,972
Herbert Orliffe - 65,418
Francis Chambers - 30,696
William Harris - 14,493
Jessie Jackson - 14,062
Burke - 13,240

1958
Jean Newman - 59,243
William Allen- 52,462
Donald Summerville - 49,476
William Dennison - 33,612
Leslie Saunders - 33,469
Roy E. Belyea - 27,024
Ross Parry - 25,195
James Karfilis - 10,971
Harry Bradley - 10,499
Ross Dowson - 4,539
George Rolland - 3,834

1956
Jean Newman - 54,785
Ford Brand - 54,178
William Allen - 54,038
Joseph Cornish - 49,385
Leslie Saunders - 47,048
Harry Bradley - 16,450
Charles Sims - 6961
George Rolland - 5,632

1955
Ford Brand - 59,264
Joseph Cornish - 55,162
William Allen - 53,455
Leslie Saunders - 46,528
Arthur J. Brown - 41,351
Harry Bradley - 14,802
Alex Hodgins - 13,503
Harry Hunter - 9,493
George Rolland - 3,923
George Stanton - 3,863

1954
Ford Brand - 69,540
Roy E. Belyea - 66,223
David Balfour - 62,871
Joseph Cornish - 55,277
Ross Lipsett - 45,385
Harry Bradley - 20,488
Harry Hunter - 14,114
Nobleman - 9,413
George Rolland - 5,280

1953
Leslie Saunders - 62,397
Louis Shannon - 57,635
Ford Brand - 54,635
David Balfour - 51,393
Joseph Cornish - 46,701
Harry Bradley - 18,686
Harry Hunter - 14,194

1952
Leslie Saunders - 71,597
Louis Shannon - 61,154
David Balfour - 58,898
Ford Brand - 58,648
Joseph Cornish - 41,086
John McMechan - 30,219
Stewart Smith - 19,061
Harry Bradley - 17,480
Frederick Vacher - 7,065
Mahoney - 7,046

1951
Leslie Saunders - 95,838
Ford Brand - 92,725
David Balfour - 91,474
Louis Shannon - 87,440
Stewart Smith - 31,317
Frederick Vacher - 20,039

December 1950
John Innes - 93,656
David Balfour - 81,577
Leslie Saunders - 80,703
Louis Shannon - 74,859
Ford Brand - 66,235
W.H. Collings - 59,380
Stewart Smith - 28,309
Mahoney - 8,210
Frederick Vacher - 7,653

January 1950
John Innes - 96,139
Leslie Saunders - 87,799
David Balfour - 78,090
Allan Lamport - 72,436
Louis Shannon - 72,059
Stewart Smith - 45,251
Harry Bradley- 21,719
Frederick Vacher - 9,850

1949
John Innes - 53,599
Leslie Saunders - 57,746
David Balfour - 55,271
Allan Lamport - 52,037
Stewart Smith - 43,364
Kenneth Bert McKellar (incumbent) - 41,846
Leonard Reilly - 20,756
E.C. Roelofson (incumbent) - 11,905
Harry Bradley- 9,701

1948
Hiram E. McCallum - 83,812
John Innes - 80,834
David Balfour - 77,087
Kenneth Bert McKellar - 75,356
Stewart Smith - 47,791
Harry Bradley - 15,711
Harry Clairmont - 4,858

1947
Hiram E. McCallum - 58,524
John Innes - 53,137
David Balfour - 51,578
Kenneth Bert McKellar - 49,680
Stewart Smith - 42,106
M.A. Sanderson - 26,136
Harry Bradley - 10,749
Harry Clairmont - 4,858

1946
Hiram E. McCallum - 42,126
Stewart Smith - 41,637
David Balfour - 40,632
Kenneth Bert McKellar - 35,627
William J. Wadsworth - 35,477
Leslie Saunders - 22,040
Harry Bradley - 6,796

1945
David Balfour - 47,931
William J. Wadsworth - 45,942
Stewart Smith - 41,691
Hiram E. McCallum - 41,201
Leslie Saunders - 34,587
E.C. Bogart - 34,258
C.D Millen - 30,235
Harry Bradley - 9,589

1944
Robert Hood Saunders (incumbent) - 73,383
Fred Hamilton (incumbent) - 52,694
William J. Wadsworth (incumbent) - 52,485
David Balfour - 50,599
Hiram E. McCallum - 50,337
Stewart Smith - 41,277
William Dennison - 30,026
William Muir - 19,061
Harry Bradley - 7,743

1943
Lewis Duncan - 40,060
Robert Hood Saunders - 33,081
Fred Hamilton - 28,919
William J. Wadsworth - 27,031
C.E. Reynolds - 26,194
Minerva Reid - 18,320
J.C. Irwin - 16,860
G.P. Granell - 5,010
Harry Bradley - 3,590

1942
Lewis Duncan - 41,656
Robert Hood Saunders - 28,923
Fred Hamilton - 28,853
William J. Wadsworth - 27,022
Ralph Day - 24,208
Minerva Reid - 20,337
J.C. Irwin - 18,272
N. Macmillan - 5,179
Harry Bradley - 3,102

1941
Lewis Duncan - 49,382
Fred Hamilton - 39,021
Robert Hood Saunders - 37,417
William J. Wadsworth - 33,411
Adelaide Plumptre - 33,021
Ernest Bray - 26,391
David A. Balfour - 20,849
Day - 4,645
Harry Bradley - 3,271
Harding - 2,523

1940
Frederick J. Conboy - 78,672
Douglas McNish - 68,774
Fred Hamilton - 60,124
William J. Wadsworth - 55,756
David A. Balfour - 43,261
Stewart Smith - 19,641
Harding - 6,548

January 1939
Frederick J. Conboy - 80,720
Douglas McNish - 73,252
Fred Hamilton - 54,516
William J. Wadsworth - 49,446
William Croft - 48,798
Tim Buck - 43,112
Robert Hood Saunders - 40,973
William D. Robbins - 24,745
Harry Bradley - 3,489

December 1937
Frederick J. Conboy - 60,665
William J. Wadsworth - 53,766
Fred Hamilton - 47,493
Douglas McNish - 44,402
Tim Buck - 44,248
Robert Hood Saunders - 41,817
Robert Allen - 15,283
Harry Bradley - 4,623

December 1936
Ralph Day - 56,847
Frederick J. Conboy - 48,976
William J. Wadsworth - 48,047
Fred Hamilton - 39,003
Douglas McNish - 32,265
Tim Buck - 31,342
Alfred Burgess - 3,983
Harry Bradley - 3,295

January 1936
Ralph Day - 68,335
William J. Wadsworth - 62,838
J. George Ramsden - 52,170
William D. Robbins - 51,465
Joseph Enoch Thompson - 31,546
Miller - 30,613
Tim Buck - 20,873
Harry Bradley - 4,986

1935
Sam McBride - 71,177
William J. Wadsworth - 58,783
William D. Robbins - 44,820
Ralph Day - 41,515
Claude Pierce - 34,064
Adelaide Plumptre - 32,872
A.E. Hacker - 29,110
Frank Regan - 26,242
Tim Buck - 9,938

1934
Sam McBride - 54,855
J. George Ramsden - 48,152
James Simpson - 47,358
William D. Robbins - 37,714
William J. Wadsworth - 36,289
Claude Pierce - 31,156
Percy Quinn - 26,872
Alice Buck - 9,767
Harry Bradley - 2,623

1933
J. George Ramsden - 55,503
Sam McBride - 55,323
James Simpson - 54,218
William D. Robbins - 48,061
Albert Hacker - 37,019
John Boland - 36,645
William Miller - 18,836
Cotton - 11,871
Alice Buck - 10,155
W.J. Haire - 3,066
J.H.H. Ballantyne - 2,183

1932
James Simpson - 42,010
J. George Ramsden - 38,200
Sam McBride - 31,939
William D. Robbins - 31,067
Albert Hacker - 30,348
Claude Pearce - 23,659
Cotton - 6,440
Tim Buck - 5,974
Harry Bradley - 1,726

1931
J. George Ramsden - 51,043
William D. Robbins - 50,801
James Simpson - 48,105
Albert Hacker - 43,763
John Boland - 41,779
Claude Pearce (incumbent) - 40,431
W.A. Summerville (incumbent) - 19,087
Foster - 13,491
Cotton - 9,014
King - 3,154
Tim Buck - 3,010

1930
W.A. Summerville (incumbent) - 47,418
Claude Pearce - 46,692
James Simpson - 44,921
William D. Robbins - 39,023
Benjamin Miller - 37,156
Frank Whetter (incumbent) - 31,772
Brook Sykes - 28,043
Wesley Benson - 25,054
Harry Bradley - 2,617

1929
Bert Wemp (incumbent) - 43,464
Joseph Gibbons (incumbent) - 32,734
W.A. Summerville - 30,292
A.E. Hacker (incumbent) - 28,667
R.H. Cameron - 27,266
Claude Pearce - 27,245
William D. Robbins (incumbent) - 23,796
James Simpson - 12,816

1928
Bert Wemp (incumbent) - 47,153
Joseph Gibbons (incumbent) - 45,655
A.E. Hacker (incumbent) - 33,433
William D. Robbins - 29,359
D.C. MacGregor (incumbent) - 28,858
Brook Sykes - 24,427
Miller - 18,122
James Simpson - 12,954

1927
Joseph Gibbons (incumbent) - 48,739
A.E. Hacker (incumbent) - 43,153
D.C. MacGregor (incumbent) - 34,813
Bert Wemp - 34,450
J. George Ramsden - 26,489
Clifford Blackburn - 22,959
Frank Whetter - 21,878
James Simpson - 10,946

1926
Joseph Gibbons (incumbent) - 37,608
Sam McBride - 36,211
A.E. Hacker (incumbent) - 31,427
D.C. MacGregor (incumbent) - 30,975
William D. Robbins - 30,320
William C. McBrien - 29,923
Bert Wemp - 28,024
Frank Whetter - 21,722
W.E. Hamilton - 2,590

1925
Joseph Gibbons (incumbent) - 39,299
A.E. Hacker (incumbent) - 34,369
William D. Robbins - 33,172
D.C. MacGregor - 30,326
R.H. Cameron (incumbent) - 29,086
James Simpson - 14,573
Birks - 4,321

1924
Joseph Gibbons (incumbent) - 42,778
Thomas Foster (incumbent) - 34,435
A.E. Hacker - 32,689
R.H. Cameron - 30,621
D.C. MacGregor - 26,637
William D. Robbins - 26,594
F.M. Johnston - 22,542
J.R. Beamish - 20,161

1923
Thomas Foster (incumbent) - 36,040
Joseph Gibbons (incumbent) - 33,740
Wesley Hiltz (incumbent) - 32,551
Joseph Singer - 32,033
Sam McBride - 30,606
A.R. Nesbitt (incumbent) - 29,947
Alfred Burgess - 24,876
James Russell Lovett Starr - 25,931

1922
Thomas Foster - 23,355
Wesley Hiltz (incumbent) - 20,001
Joseph Gibbons (incumbent) - 18,647
A.R. Nesbitt (incumbent) - 16,453
William D. Robbins - 16,814
R.H. Cameron - 15,403
J. George Ramsden - 14,721
Clifford Blackburn - 12,950
William Varley - 3,419

1921
Charles A. Maguire (incumbent) - 34,141
Wesley Hiltz - 22,615
Joseph Gibbons (incumbent) - 18,612
A.R. Nesbitt - 19,202
William D. Robbins - 18,015
R.H. Cameron (incumbent) - 17,872
J. George Ramsden (incumbent) - 17,393
Herbert Henry Ball - 16,911

1920
Charles A. Maguire (incumbent) - 28,438
Joseph Gibbons - 23,269
R.H. Cameron (incumbent) - 21,055
J. George Ramsden - 18,473
William D. Robbins (incumbent) - 17,716
Herbert Henry Ball - 16,506
James Simpson - 10,832
Wright - 7,927

1919
Charles A. Maguire (incumbent) - 19,963
R.H. Cameron - 19,094
Sam McBride (incumbent) - 18,476
William D. Robbins (incumbent) - 19,270
Joseph Gibbons - 16,397
Garnet Archibald - 15,603
Fred McBrien - 13,570

1918
John O'Neill (incumbent) - 24,952
William D. Robbins - 19,000
Sam McBride - 17,850
Charles A. Maguire - 17,711
William Henry Shaw (incumbent) - 14,255
D.C. MacGregor - 14,468
Garnet Archibald - 8,992
Miles Vokes - 2,720
Edward Meek - 2,262

1917
R.H. Cameron (incumbent) - 15,615
John O'Neill (incumbent) - 15,141
Thomas Foster (incumbent) - 13,939
William Henry Shaw - 11,967
James Simpson - 10,779
Sam McBride - 10,085
Francis Stephens Spence - 9,281

1916
Joseph Elijah Thompson (incumbent) -18,209
John O'Neill (incumbent) - 17,572
Thomas Foster (incumbent) - 16,085
R.H. Cameron - 15,391
James Simpson (incumbent) - 13,080
Francis Stephens Spence (incumbent) - 12,652
John Dunn - 11,009

1915
John O'Neill (incumbent) - 20,751
Thomas Foster - 18,608
Francis Stephens Spence - 17,747
Joseph Elijah Thompson - 16,505
James Simpson (incumbent) - 16,349
Fred McBrien - 15,447
John Wanless - 13,044

1914
James Simpson - 20,695
J.O. McCarthy (incumbent) - 17,490
Tommy Church (incumbent) - 17,085
John O'Neill (incumbent) - 14,597
Joseph Elijah Thompson - 14,233
Thomas Foster (incumbent) - 13,929
Robert Yeomans - 11,708
Eckardt - 7,755

1913
Thomas Foster (incumbent) - 15,861
John O'Neill - 14,600
J.O. McCarthy (incumbent) - 14,036
Tommy Church (incumbent) - 12,765
Francis Stephens Spence (incumbent) - 11,976
Robert Yeomens - 10,713
James Simpson - 10,122
Charles A. Maguire - 9,388
J.J. Ward - 9,278
George R. Sweeny - 1,643
Richard Woods - 498

1912
Horatio Clarence Hocken (incumbent) - 16,904
J.O. McCarthy - 14,897
Thomas Foster - 14,462
Tommy Church (incumbent) - 12,149
Francis Stephens Spence (incumbent) - 12,003
J.J. Ward (incumbent) - 11,735
O'Donohue - 4,022
George R. Sweeny - 3,921

1911
Horatio Clarence Hocken - 22,761
Francis Stephens Spence(incumbent) - 16,187
J.J. Ward (incumbent) - 15,999
Tommy Church (incumbent) - 15,760
Thomas Foster (incumbent) - 15,540
Thomas Davies - 3,285

1910
Francis Stephens Spence - 13,879
J.J. Ward (incumbent) - 13,401
Tommy Church - 12,657
Thomas Foster - 10,841
William Spence Harrison (incumbent) - 9,946
William Peyton Hubbard - 9,498
Mark Bredin - 8,708
James Henry McGhie - 7,511
James Hales - 5,852
Albert Chamberlain - 2,730

1909
George Reginald Geary - 19,027
Horatio Clarence Hocken (incumbent) - 17,380
J.J. Ward (incumbent) - 15,782
William Spence Harrison (incumbent) - 13,509
Francis Stephens Spence (incumbent) - 12,933
William Peyton Hubbard - 11,275
Hales - 8,171
Robert Buist Noble - 1,287
James O'Hara - 779

1908
Horatio Clarence Hocken (incumbent) - 16,844
Francis Stephens Spence - 11,512
William Spence Harrison (incumbent) - 10,312
J.J. Ward (incumbent) - 10,075
William Peyton Hubbard (incumbent) - 9,203
John Shaw - 6,385
Robert Fleming - 5,640
Oliver Sheppard - 5,099
John Dunn - 4,434
John Enoch Thompson - 1,291
James Lindala - 1,220
Hugh MacMath - 1,013
Robert Buist Noble - 745
James O'Hara - 367
Joel Marvin Briggs - 232

1907
J.J. Ward (incumbent) - 9,362
William Spence Harrison - 9,054
Horatio Clarence Hocken - 8,639
William Peyton Hubbard (incumbent) - 8,483
Robert Fleming - 7,077
S. Alfred Jones (incumbent) - 6,710
John Shaw (incumbent) - 6,465
John Dunn - 5,038
Davies - 1,390
Joel Marvin Briggs - 496

1906
William Peyton Hubbard (incumbent) - 14,081
S. Alfred Jones - 14,039
J.J. Ward (incumbent) - 13,770
John Shaw (incumbent) - 12,524
Hastings - 11,308

1905
Francis Stephens Spence (incumbent) - 13,032
J.J. Ward - 12,993
William Peyton Hubbard (incumbent) - 12,880
John Shaw - 12,436
James Russell Lovett Starr - 9,823
Joseph Oliver - 8,141
Thomas Foster - 6,395
G.R. Ramsden - 5,839
Frank Moses - 5,048
A.R. Denison - 4,925
Edward Hanlan - 2,178

1904
Francis Stephens Spence - 12,294
John F. Loudon - 11,121
William Peyton Hubbard - 8,950
Fred H. Richardson - 8,923
William Burns - 8,641
James Russell Lovett Starr - 8,639
Joseph Oliver - 8,598
John Shaw - 7,184

== Suburban Boards of Control ==
Several other municipalities in Metropolitan Toronto also created Boards of Control. Etobicoke created its Board of Control in the 1962 municipal election and North York first elected its Board of Control in the 1964 municipal election. Scarborough and York launched their boards at the 1966 election. North York, and Scarborough had 5 person boards consisting of their respective mayors and four controllers elected at large while York's board consisted of a mayor and two Controllers. East York never created a Board of Control. Etobicoke's board consisted of the reeve and two Controllers until the 1966 election when it expanded to four Controllers and the mayor.

The top two candidates from the Toronto Board of Control also sat on, Metro Toronto Council. Beginning with the 1966 municipal election, several members of suburban Boards of Control sat on Metro Council as well as their borough's council - the number depended on the number of seats on Metro Council that borough was allocated.

With the 1988 municipal election, the suburban Boards of Control were abolished and Metro Councillors were instead directly elected from special Metro Wards (consisting of two local wards).

=== Etobicoke ===
Beginning in 1966, the top three candidates for Etobicoke's Board of Control also sat on Metro Council.

Names in boldface indicate Controllers that were or became Reeve or Mayor of Etobicoke in other years. Italics indicate those who only sat on the Board of Control as mayor.

X = elected as Controller
A = appointed Controller to fill a vacancy
M = sitting as Reeve or Mayor

Elections to the Board of Control for Etobicoke (1962-1985)
Controller	1962	1964	1966	1969	1972	1974	1976	1978	1980	1982	1985
**John Palmer MacBeth**	M	M									
Murray Johnson	X	X									
John Carroll	X	X	X	X							
**Edward Austin Horton**			M	M							
Donald Russell			X	X							
David Lacey			X	X					X		
W. Kenneth Robinson			X								
John Allen				X	X	X					
**Dennis Flynn***					M	M	M	M	M	M	
**Bruce Sinclair***					X	X	X	X	X	X/M	M
Winfield (Bill) Stockwell					X	X	X	X	X		
E. H. (Pete) Farrow					X	X	X				
Nora Pownall						X	X	X			
Morley Kells								X			X
Dick O'Brien									X	X	X
Leonard Braithwaite										X	X
Christopher Stockwell										X	
Lois Griffin*										A	X

*Dennis Flynn resigned as mayor as a result of his appointment as Metro Chairman in August 1984. On September 4, 1984, Etobicoke City Council appointed Controller Bruce Sinclair to replace Flynn as mayor and appointed Lois Griffin to fill the Controller position vacated by Sinclair.

=== North York ===
Names in boldface indicate Controllers that were or became Mayor of North York in other years. Italics indicate those who only sat on the Board of Control as mayor. Beginning in 1966, all of North York's Controllers also sat on Metro Council.

X = elected as Controller
A = appointed Controller to fill a vacancy
M = sitting as Reeve or Mayor

Elections to the Board of Control for North York (1964-1985)
Controller	1964	1966	1969	1972	1974	1976	1978	1980	1982	1985
**James Ditson Service**	M	M								
G. Gordon Hurlburt	X	X								
Irving Paisley	X		X				X			
Frank Watson	X	X								
**Basil H. Hall**	X	X	M							
Paul Hunt		X	X							
**Mel Lastman**			X	M	M	M	M	M	M	M
John Booth*			X							
Paul Godfrey*			A	X						
John Williams				X						
Alex McGivern				X	X					
Barbara Greene				X	X	X	X		X	
William Sutherland*				A	X			X	X	
Joseph Markin					X					
Esther Shiner**						X	X	X	X	X
Ron Summers						X				
Robert Yuill						X	X	X	X	X
Norm Gardner								X		X
Howard Moscoe										X
Mario Gentile**										A

* Booth died in 1970 and was replaced by Paul Godfrey who served out the balance of his term. Godfrey was reelected in 1972, but resigned when he was elected Metro Chairman in 1973 following the death of Metro Chairman Albert Campbell. North York Council elected Alderman William Sutherland to replace Godfrey on the Board of Control on July 23, 1973.

**Shiner died on December 19, 1987. Councillor Mario Gentile was appointed to the Board of Control in February 1988 to fill Shiner's seat.

=== Scarborough ===
All of Scarborough's Controllers also sat on Metro Council.

X = elected as Controller
A = appointed Controller to fill a vacancy
M = sitting as Mayor

Elections to the Board of Control for Scarborough (1966-1985)
Controller	1966	1969	1972	1974	1976	1978	1980	1982	1985
**Albert Campbell***	M								
**Robert W. White***	X/M	M							
**Gus Harris**	X	X	X	X	X	M	M	M	M
Brian Harrison	X	X	X	X	X	X	X	X	
Karl Mallette	X	X	X						
**Ken Morrish*** **	A	X	X	X	X/M		X		X
**Paul Cosgrove****			M	M	M				
**Joyce Trimmer*****				X	X	X	X	X	X
**Frank Faubert**** ***					A	X		X	X
Carol Ruddell						X	X	X	
Bill Belfontaine									X

*Albert Campbell resigned as mayor after being elected Metro Chairman on October 1, 1969. Scarborough Council appointed Robert W. White to fill the vacancy as mayor and, on October 6, 1969, appointed Alderman Ken Morrish to the Board of Control to fill White's vacant position as Controller.

**Paul Cosgrove resigned as mayor after being elected to the House of Commons of Canada in an October 16, 1978 by-election. Ken Morrish was appointed acting mayor in Cosgrove's place and Frank Faubert was appointed to the Board of Control to fill Morrish's vacated Controller position. Morrish was defeated by Gus Harris in the mayoral election a month later.

***Trimmer served as mayor from 1988 to 1993; Faubert was mayor from 1994 to 1997

=== York ===
York's two Controllers also sat on Metro Council.

Names in boldface indicate Controllers that were or became Mayor of York in other years. Italics indicate those who only sat on the Board of Control as mayor.

X = elected as Controller
A = appointed Controller to fill a vacancy
M = sitting as Reeve or Mayor

Elections to the Board of Control for York (1966-1985)
Controller	1966	1969	1972	1974	1976	1978	1980	1982	1985
C. Wesley Boddington	X								
**Fergy Brown***						X	X	X	X
**Gayle Christie**						M	M		
**Jack Mould**	M								
Doug Saunders		X	X	X	X				
**Alan Tonks**					X	X		M	M
James Trimbee		X	X	X					
**Philip White**	X	M	M	M	M		X	X	X

*Brown served as mayor from 1988 to 1994

== See also ==
- Board of Control (municipal government)
