= 1907 Toronto municipal election =

Municipal elections were held in Toronto, Ontario, Canada, on January 1, 1907. Incumbent Mayor of Toronto Emerson Coatsworth was re-elected to a second one-year term, defeating Socialist Party of Canada candidate James Lindala and Robert Buist Noble, who was also a socialist. Lindala's strong showing and the mayor's reduced vote total was seen as a repudiation of Coatsworth with The Globe newspaper declaring on its front page "that an unknown Socialist tailor of foreign birth should poll over eight thousand votes for the Mayoralty of Toronto against a barrister of irreproachable personal character, who at one time represented his native city in Parliament... proves how utterly repugnant has been the jellyfish administration of the past year." Coatsworth did not run for a third term the following year.

== Toronto mayor ==
Results
Emerson Coatsworth - 13,698
James Lindala - 8,286
Robert Buist Noble - 1,330

== Board of Control ==
Two incumbent members of the Toronto Board of Control were re-elected, while Controllers S. Alfred Jones and John Shaw were defeated. William Spence Harrison and Horatio Clarence Hocken joined the Board.

John J. Ward (incumbent) - 9,362
William Spence Harrison - 9,054
Horatio Clarence Hocken - 8,639
William Peyton Hubbard (incumbent) - 8,483
Robert Fleming - 7,077
S. Alfred Jones (incumbent) - 6,710
John Shaw (incumbent) - 6,465
John Dunn - 5,038
Thomas Davies - 1,390
Joel Marvin Briggs - 496

Source: and

== Plebiscites ==
Four plebiscites were held. Proposals for $3 million to be spent on a trunk sewer, $110,000 to build a bridge over Yonge Street to accommodate streetcars and $125,000 for a new entrance to the Exhibition grounds were defeated. A proposal was approved to allow the city to enter into negotiations to purchase electricity from the new public Hydro-Electric Power Commission of Ontario rather than private electricity companies, despite the criticisms of the mayor and the opposition of private electric companies.

Power by-law
For -10,696
Against -2,905

Exhibition by-law
For - 4,015
Against - 8,841

Trunk sewer by-law
For - 5,427
Against - 7,515

Yonge Street Bridge by-law
For - 4,354
Against - 7,812

== City council ==
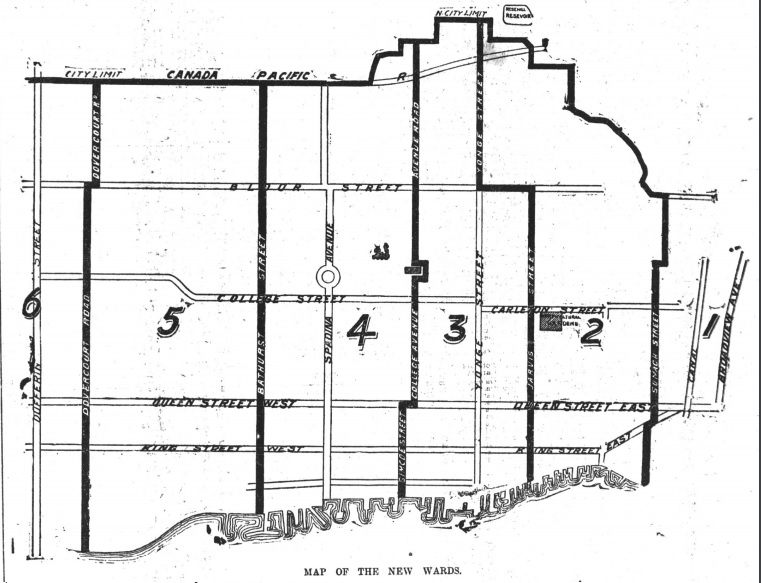
Map of Toronto's six wards (1892-1909), published in The Globe, 1 January 1892.

Three aldermen were elected to Toronto City Council per ward.

First Ward (Riverdale)
Daniel Chisholm (incumbent) - 1,758
Edward Hales - 1,402
James Wilson - 1,282
William Temple Stewart (incumbent) - 1,142
William John Saunderson - 1,107

Second Ward (Cabbagetown and Rosedale)
Thomas Foster - 1,719
James Hales - 1,402
Tommy Church (incumbent) - 1,653
Dr. John Noble (incumbent) - 1,172
Edward Strachan Cox - 1,065
Frederick Hogg - 816
Patrick O'Connor - 725

Third Ward (Central Business District and The Ward)
George Reginald Geary (incumbent) - 2,608
John Wilson Bengough - 2,389
Sam McBride (incumbent) - 1,058
J.A. Humphrey - 936
Francis William Johnston - 883
John Harris - 755
John Solomon Granatstein - 409
Abraham Friedman - 135

Fourth Ward (Spadina)
George McMurrich (incumbent) - 2,507
Robert Crawford Vaughan (incumbent) - 2,501
Thomas Alexander Lytle - 1,862
Harry Lovelock - 1516
Alexander R. Williamson - 1,062
Dr. Charles E. Stacey - 940

Fifth Ward (Trinity-Bellwoods)
Albert James Keeler (incumbent) - 1,953
Robert Henry Graham - 1,559
Peter Whytock - 1,479
John Aldridge - 1,173
William Carlyle - 1,063
Blayney Harvey Scott- 969
William J. Bell - 645
Henry Egbert Hurd - 622
John Albert Couch - 500
Henry T. Meredith - 463

Sixth Ward (Brockton and Parkdale)
James Henry McGhie (incumbent) - 2,654
John James Graham (incumbent) - 2,176
John Henry Adams (incumbent) - 1,850
Thomas Hurst - 1,415

Source: and
