= Mariano Vélez =

Filipino boxer (1925–2004)

Personal information
- Nationality: Filipino
- Born: 1925 Cagayan de Oro, Misamis Oriental, Philippine Islands
- Died: 2004 (aged 78–79)

Sport
- Sport: Boxing
- Weight class: Welterweight

Mariano M. Vélez Jr. (1925–2004) was a Filipino amateur boxer. He competed in the men's welterweight event at the 1948 Summer Olympics. At the 1948 Summer Olympics, he lost to Clifford Blackburn of Canada.
