= Adelaide Plumptre =

English-born Canadian activist, diplomat and politician (1874–1948)

Adelaide Wilson Plumptre CBE (1874 – 1948) was an English-born Canadian activist, diplomat and politician.

== Biography ==
She was born Adelaide Proctor in Surrey, England, and studied at Somerville College, Oxford University. There she met and married Henry Pemberton Plumptre, the vice-principal of the theological college. They moved to Toronto in 1901 when he accepted the position of principal at Wycliffe College. Upon arrival she took a job at Havergal College, an elite Anglican girls' school.

H. P. Plumptre became an important figure in the local Anglican church, rising to become rector of St. James Cathedral. Adelaide Plumptre became a committed activist in an array of different causes. She was active in the YWCA, a founding member of Girl Guides of Canada, and active in the women's movement and the Canadian Council of Women. She was most involved with the Red Cross. She became Director of Supplies of the Canadian Red Cross in September 1914 and remained in that role for the whole of the First World War. She took the lead in organizing the logistics of the Red Cross' wartime relief efforts across Canada and overseas. She also directed the communications and recruitment of the Red Cross, writing much of the material herself. She was the first woman named to the executive of the Canadian Red Cross. In 1918, she was appointed by the federal government to be chair of the Woman's War Council.

In 1926, she was elected to the school board. She served on the board for nine years, and became the first woman elected chair of the Toronto Board of Education. In 1931, she was made Canada's delegate to the League of Nations in Geneva, one of only two women to be a delegate to the league. She was also the Canadian delegate to the International Red Cross meeting held in Tokyo in 1934.

In 1936, she became the third woman elected to Toronto City Council. On city council she was a committed activist for the city's poor. In 1941, she attempted to become the first woman to win a seat on the powerful Board of Control, but lost by a few hundred votes. During the Second World War she resumed her work with the Red Cross and led the Prisoner of War Bureau. She was appointed CBE in 1943.
