= Joseph Singer (politician) =

Joseph Singer, K.C., (1890 – November 22, 1967) was a Toronto city councillor, lawyer and prominent figure in the city's Jewish community. He was the third Jewish candidate to be elected to Toronto City Councillor, and the first Jew to win citywide election to the Toronto Board of Control.

Singer was born in Toronto, Ontario in 1890. He was educated at Osgoode Hall Law School where he was a gold medallist and also won the first VanKoughnet scholarship in 1911. A lawyer, he was vice-president of the Federated Jewish Philanthropies in Toronto.

In 1915, Singer was elected the first president of the Jewish Political Association, an organization which attempted to encourage Jews to become involved in mainstream political parties as well as promote issues relating to immigration and civil rights.

He was first elected to Toronto City Council in 1920 representing Ward 4 which included the predominantly Jewish neighbourhood of Kensington Market. He was re-elected as an alderman in the 1921 and 1922 municipal elections. In 1923 he won citywide office by being elected to the powerful Toronto Board of Control. He was nominated as a candidate to be Mayor of Toronto but did not run in order not to split the opposition to Tommy Church and did not run for any office in the January 1924 municipal election. He returned to City Council in the 1925 municipal election as Alderman for Ward 3 which included the original Jewish neighbourhood of The Ward. He ran in the 1925 federal election as a Liberal but was defeated in the riding of Toronto West Centre and returned to his legal practice.

He remained active in the Liberal Party and ran for the party's nomination in Toronto West Centre prior to the 1930 federal election but withdrew in favour of Alderman Sam Factor who went on to be elected to parliament.

His brother, Abraham Singer, ran for city council from Ward 4 in 1931 but was defeated.

His son, Vernon Singer, served as reeve of North York, Ontario, ran for the leadership of the Ontario Liberal Party and served as a member of the Ontario legislature from 1959 to 1977, including a period as deputy leader in the early 1970s.

Singer died at the age of 77 at Toronto's Mount Sinai Hospital.

== See also ==
- Louis Singer
