= Ethel Small =

Canadian politician

Ethel Small (née Ethel Dallas Horstmann) in 1921 became the second woman elected to the Toronto city council. She was the younger daughter of Ferdinand Oden Horstmann (1846–1894) and Harriett Kelley Horstmann. The Horstmann family were wealthy Philadelphia manufacturers and merchants of military garment trimmings (passementerie) and military regalia.

Until she married Sidney Small of Toronto November 22, 1905 in Washington, D.C., Ethel Horstmann lived the life of a wealthy socialite in Philadelphia and Washington, D.C. attending races, presidential balls and diplomatic receptions. At the time of 1911 census, Ethel and Sidney Small were residing at 70 Walmer Road, Toronto, in the wealthy Annex. Sidney Small was a successful commercial real estate agent with offices on Adelaide Street.

Ethel Small's interest in politics may derive from her mother's side of the family. Her maternal grandfather William D. Kelley was a founder of the U.S. Republican Party and a lifelong advocate of civil rights, social reform, and labor protection.
