= Harry Winberg =

Harry Winberg (also known as Harry Wineberg) was an entrepreneur and politician in Toronto, Canada. Winberg was born in the late-19th century to a Jewish family in the Kovno, Lithuania which was then part of the Russian Empire. His father was a wheat merchant. At the age of 10, Harry Winberg decided to leave and join his sister who was living in Toronto running a grocery store with her husband. After Winberg arrived in Toronto, via Hamburg, and New York City, he spoke Yiddish, Russian, Polish, and German but no English. He worked in his brother-in-law's store before becoming a street peddler. He eventually saved enough money to open his own store and then a dry goods wholesale business and then at the age of 24 he opened a jewellery store.

He later entered real estate and in 1907 built Toronto's first tenement apartment building, the Wineberg Apartments, situated in The Ward district at Elizabeth Street and what is now Dundas Street. The housing development consisted of three storeys in an E shape with rooms opening off of long corridors running the length of the building. The building housed 28 four-room apartments as well as 11 shops, which were on the ground floor. The commercial rents charged to shopkeepers were meant to subsidize the lower rents charged to residential tenants providing better housing than the often slum conditions that were common in the Ward at a reasonable price. In 1911, 90 percent of the families living in the development were Jewish, with two-thirds being immigrants from Russia or Eastern Europe. Winberg sold the building around 1911. By the end of World War I the composition of the building had changed with more tenants being Chinese immigrants and fewer residents being women or children.

Winberg, while no longer a peddler himself, lobbied on behalf of the Hebrew Peddlers Union for better conditions for Jewish peddlers in Toronto and was involved with advocacy for the Jewish community generally.

He entered publishing, purchasing the Yiddisher Zhurnal (known in English as the Hebrew Journal), a daily Yiddish newspaper. Winberg ran for Mayor of Toronto in the 1916 Toronto municipal election and came in second place behind Tommy Church winning 9,880 votes compared to Church's 28,541. He ran again in the 1925 Toronto municipal election and came in third.

In the 1925 Canadian federal election, Winberg ran for the nomination to be the Liberal Party of Canada candidate in Toronto West Centre but withdrew his candidacy.
