= Horatio Clarence Hocken =

Canadian politician (1857–1937)

The Honourable Horatio Clarence Hocken
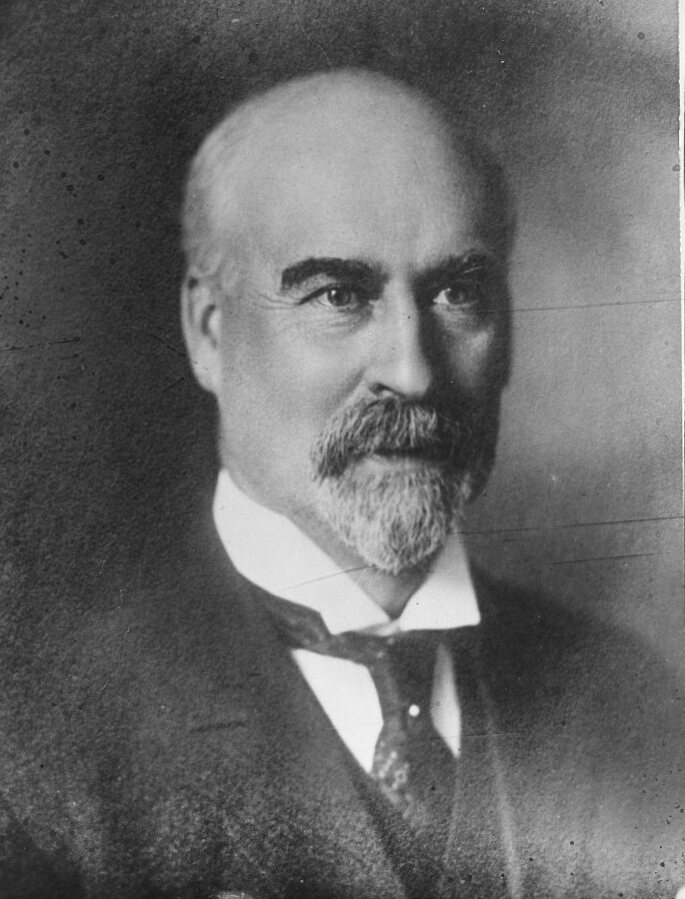
- Hocken, c. 1925

Canadian Senator from Ontario
- In office December 30, 1933 – February 18, 1937
- Appointed by: R. B. Bennett

Member of Parliament for Toronto West Centre
- In office 1925–1930
- Preceded by: The riding was created in 1924.
- Succeeded by: Samuel Factor

Member of Parliament for Toronto West
- In office 1917–1925
- Preceded by: Edmund Boyd Osler
- Succeeded by: The riding was abolished in 1924.

36th Mayor of Toronto
- In office 1912–1914
- Preceded by: George Reginald Geary
- Succeeded by: Thomas Langton Church

Personal details
- Born: October 12, 1857 Toronto, Canada West
- Died: February 18, 1937 (aged 79) Toronto, Ontario, Canada
- Party: Unionist Party; Conservative Party
- Spouse: Isabella Page (m. 1880, d.1937)
- Children: 4

Horatio Clarence Hocken (October 12, 1857 – February 18, 1937) was a Canadian politician, Mayor of Toronto, social reformer, a founder of what became the Toronto Star and Grand Master of the Grand Orange Lodge of British America from 1914 to 1918.

== Early life ==
Born in Toronto in what was pre-Confederation Canada West, Hocken had a media career as a printer, publisher and journalist. After working as a typesetter at the Toronto Globe, where he led a strike, Hocken, in 1892, Hocken was a foreman in the print room of the Toronto News when the Typographical Union went on strike. He and 20 other strikers founded the Evening Star as a strike paper with Hocken as the new paper's business manager. He subsequently left the Star and returned to the News where he became city editor. In 1905 he purchased The Orange Sentinel, a weekly newspaper serving supporters of the Orange Order.

== Local politics ==
He served on the Toronto Board of Control from 1907 until 1910 when he made his first unsuccessful bid for the mayor's office and again from 1911 until 1912. He served as mayor from 1912 to 1914. He is credited with approving the Bloor Viaduct. As mayor, Hocken supported opening city parks to public use rather than being restricted to the use of athletic societies arguing that parks are for "walking in, not for athletic sports". He built public baths, installed a sewage treatment plant and a filtration plant, and the extension of the sewer system.

Hocken's term also saw the distribution of free milk to children living in slums and the establishment of a public health nursing program. His reforms saw the death rate from communicable diseases drop from 114 per 100,000 to 27 per 100,000. Hocken also supported the creation of a public housing company that built houses and rented them for a cost. The city, under his stewardship, also purchased an abattoir and cold storage facility to help keep small butchers from being driven out of business by "the great meat trust."

== Federal politics ==
Hocken's career in federal politics began when he was elected to the House of Commons of Canada for the Unionist Party at the Toronto West riding in the 1917 federal election. He was re-elected in Toronto West in the 1921 federal election, this time under the Conservative Party. When the riding boundaries were changed in 1924, he was re-elected in the Toronto West Centre riding in the 1925 and 1926 federal elections. He served in the 13th to the 16th Canadian Parliaments consecutively until he left federal politics in 1930.

Hocken was appointed a member of the Senate of Canada on 30 December 1933 and remained in that office until his death.

== Personal life ==
He married Isabella Page in 1880. They had four children. He died two days after she did.
