= John Winnett =

American equestrian

Personal information
- Full name: John Winfield Winnett Jr.
- Born: December 22, 1928 Los Angeles, California
- Died: October 5, 2007 (aged 78) Wellington, Florida
Medal record
Equestrian
Representing the United States
Pan American Games
Gold medal – first place	1975 Mexico City	Team dressage
Silver medal – second place	1975 Mexico City	Individual dressage

John Winfield Winnett Jr. (December 22, 1928, in Los Angeles, California – October 5, 2007, in Wellington, Florida ) was an American equestrian who competed in the 1972 Summer Olympics.

Winnett spent much of his early years in Europe where he had access to an outstanding equestrian education from which he benefitted. In 1945, he was the Junior National Champion of France in show jumping.

== Coaches ==
He studied dressage in the 1960s and ‘70s with Fritz Steken, one of the greatest dressage riders in Europe, Dr. Reiner Klimke, a German six time Olympic gold medalist, and Herbert Rehbein. One of his best known coaches was likely his 1976 American Olympic Dressage Team coach, Colonel Bengt Ljungquist of Sweden, former Cavalry officer, Dressage competitor and Olympic fencing athlete, who helped American dressage break a 28-year Olympic medal drought that year.

== World championships ==
In August 1974, John captained and rode with the American dressage team at the World Championships in Copenhagen. The team also competed at Falsterbo, Sweden a week earlier, and then after the Worlds, Rotterdam, Holland, and Aachen, West Germany.

== 1972 Olympics ==
He competed as a member and as Captain of the United States Equestrian Dressage team in the 1972 Olympics in Munich, Germany and as a reserve rider in the 1976 Olympics held in Montreal, Canada. In 1980 Winnett qualified for the U.S. Olympic team but did not compete due to the Olympic Committee's boycott of the 1980 Summer Olympics in Moscow, Russia. He was one of 461 athletes to receive a Congressional Gold Medal instead.

=== Pan Am Games ===
He made one of his strongest showings, competing in the American Dressage Team trials, for the 1975 Pan Am Games finishing first with 1,289 points, well ahead of American team's Hilda Gurney. He won a gold medal in team dressage for America at the Pan American games in Mexico City, as well as an individual silver medal in dressage. His mounts included Leopardi, Mario and Sovereign.

Retiring from competition in 1990, he and his wife, Roanne Denny, settled in Wellington, Florida in 1996 where they taught students and trained horses to Grand Prix.

Winnett wrote the book Dressage as Art in Competition, first published in 1993.

He died after an illness on October 5, 2007, at the Hospice of Palm Beach at West Palm Beach. He was married and had a wife, son, and daughter.
