= John O'Neill (Canadian politician) =

Canadian politician

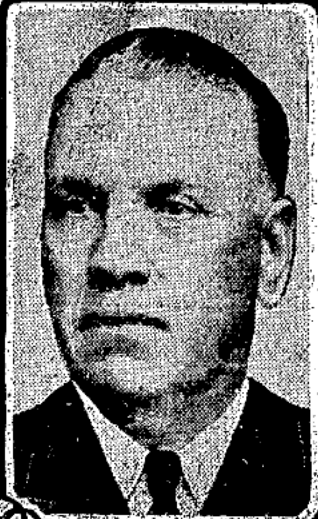

Ontario MPP
- In office 1919–1922
- Preceded by: Edward William James Owens
- Succeeded by: John Allister Currie
- Constituency: Toronto Southeast - Seat A

Personal details
- Born: c. 1858 Toronto, Canada West
- Died: January 6, 1922 (aged 63) Toronto, Ontario
- Party: Liberal

John O'Neill (c. 1858 – January 6, 1922) was a municipal and provincial politician from Toronto, Ontario, Canada.

O'Neill was born to a family of Irish immigrants in the Cabbagetown neighbourhood of Toronto, an area that was then one of the poorest in Canada and home to thousands of working class Irish immigrants. His father delivered milk to the local neighbourhood, and this was also O'Neill's first career. He then became owner of a small hotel at the corner of Queen and Parliament St. From this he moved into the property business, where he made his fortune.

He was elected to Toronto City Council and served there four years before being elected to the Board of Control. He championed causes to help the city's poor and his own neighbourhood of Cabbagetown. These included new parks and playgrounds, city owned farms to provide work for the unemployed, and an old aged home. O'Neill was one of only a few Catholics in a Toronto politics that was then dominated by members of the Orange Order, but he gained enough interdenominational support to top the Board of Control vote on several occasions. In the 1919 election O'Neill chose to run for mayor against incumbent, fellow Cabbagetowner, Tommy Church. Church prevailed by a large margin and O'Neill left municipal politics.

He chose instead to run provincially for the Ontario Liberal Party in the riding of Toronto Southeast - Seat A. He won the traditionally Conservative seat in the 1919 Ontario election, which was a general rout for the Conservatives. O'Neill served less than a full term. He died suddenly at age 63 in January 1922. O'Neill House, a homeless shelter on George St, is named is his honour.
