= Clifford Blackburn =

Canadian boxer (1927–2017)

Personal information
- Nationality: Canadian
- Born: 30 October 1927
- Died: 3 June 2017 (aged 89)

Sport
- Sport: Boxing

Clifford Blackburn (30 October 1927 – 3 June 2017) was a Canadian boxer. He competed in the men's welterweight event at the 1948 Summer Olympics. At the 1948 Summer Olympics, he defeated Mariano Vélez of the Philippines, before losing to Július Torma of Czechoslovakia.
