= Fred McBrien =

Canadian politician

Frederick George McBrien
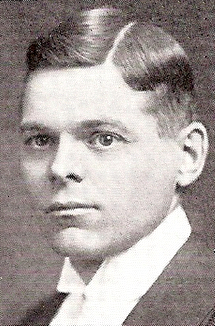
- Fred McBrien while attending Osgoode Hall law school circa 1914.

Member of Provincial Parliament
- In office 1937–1938
- Preceded by: William Price
- Succeeded by: William Stewart
- Constituency: Parkdale

Member of the Legislative Assembly
- In office 1926–1934
- Preceded by: Riding established
- Succeeded by: Riding abolished
- Constituency: Brockton

Member of the Legislative Assembly
- In office 1923–1926
- Preceded by: John Ramsden
- Succeeded by: Riding abolished
- Constituency: Toronto Southwest - Seat B

Personal details
- Born: 15 June 1888 Mono Township, Dufferin County, Ontario
- Died: 2 July 1938 (aged 50) Toronto, Ontario
- Party: Conservative
- Spouse: Irene Jarrett
- Children: 2
- Occupation: Barrister/Businessman

Frederick George McBrien (15 June 1888 – 2 July 1938) was an Ontario lawyer and political figure. He represented Toronto Southwest and then Brockton from 1923 to 1934 and Parkdale from 1937 to 1938 in the Legislative Assembly of Ontario as a Conservative member. He died in office at the age of 50.

He was born in on 15 June 1888 in the Mono Township, Dufferin County, Ontario and educated in Toronto and at Osgoode Hall. He was a newspaper boy for the Toronto Star in his youth. When he was 17, he opened a hardware store with his younger brother William, supplying builders in Toronto's growing outlying areas. He began studying law at Osgoode Hall 1914, while still running his hardware business, and graduated in 1922. McBrien was named King's Counsel in 1934.

He first ran for city council in 1908, and after three tries, was elected on 1 January 1911 as the Alderman for Ward 6 of the former City of Toronto, in the west-end. At the time, Toronto had yearly city council elections on New Year's Day. He decided to run for mayor in 1914; at the time, he was the youngest person to run for that office at age 25. He was defeated by incumbent mayor Horatio Clarence Hocken by just over 1000 votes.

In June 1938, he had a heart attack, and was hospitalized at Toronto Western Hospital. He died on 2 July 1938 at the hospital. An odd thing happened regarding his funeral. His brother William McBrien was the chair of the Toronto Transit Commission at the time, and was involved in a minor car accident on his way to make the funeral arrangements for Fred. Since he died in office, his funeral was attended by the province's premier Mitchell Hepburn and Toronto mayor Ralph Day.

His daughter Muriel was one of the founding co-owners of the Kansas City Royals baseball team along with her husband Ewing Kauffman.
