= Arthur Russell Nesbitt =

Canadian politician

Russell Nesbitt

Ontario MPP
- In office 1926–1937
- Preceded by: New riding
- Succeeded by: Lionel Conacher
- Constituency: Bracondale
- In office 1923–1926
- Preceded by: Henry Cooper
- Succeeded by: Riding abolished
- Constituency: Toronto Northwest - Seat B

Personal details
- Born: November 1, 1883; Nestleton, Durham County, Ontario
- Died: July 11, 1962 (aged 78); Toronto, Ontario
- Political party: Conservative
- Spouse: Sadie Harrison Brown (m. 1913)
- Children: 1
- Occupation: Lawyer

Arthur Russell Nesbitt (November 1, 1883 – July 11, 1962) was an Ontario lawyer and political figure. He was elected to Toronto City Council for Ward 4 beginning in 1920, was subsequently elected to the Toronto Board of Control and then was elected provincially representing Toronto Northwest and then Bracondale in the Legislative Assembly of Ontario from 1923 to 1937 as a Conservative member.

He was born in Nestleton, Durham County, Ontario, the son of George M. Nesbitt. Nesbitt was educated at Toronto University and Osgoode Hall, was called to the bar in 1910 and set up practice in Toronto. In 1913, he married Sadie Harrison Brown. Nesbitt was a Master in the Orange Lodge. He and Sadie raised one daughter together.
