= W. W. Hiltz =

Canadian politician

Bill Hiltz
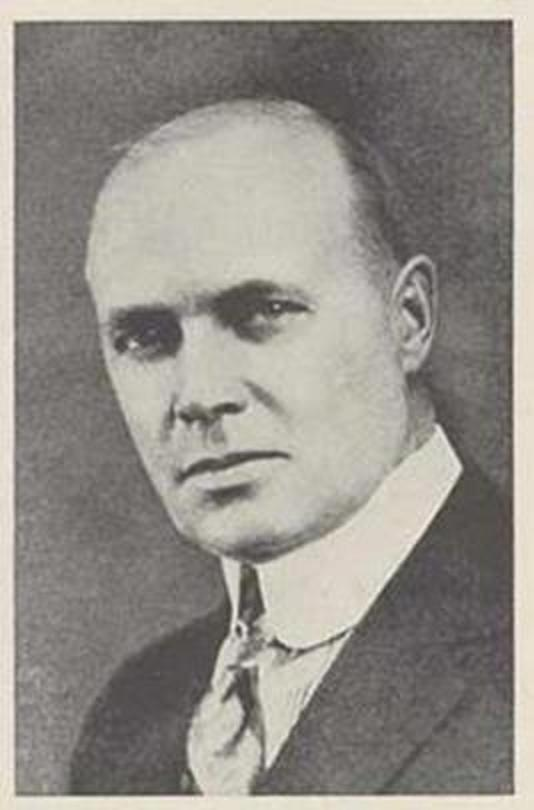

39th Mayor of Toronto
- In office 1924–1925
- Preceded by: Charles A. Maguire
- Succeeded by: Thomas Foster

Personal details
- Born: William Wesley Hilts; November 2, 1872 Ballinafad, Ontario, Canada
- Died: February 26, 1936 (aged 63) Toronto, Ontario, Canada
- Resting place: Mount Pleasant Cemetery
- Spouse: Annie Elizabeth Laidlaw
- Children: 4 daughters 3 sons

William Wesley "Bill" Hiltz (2 November 1872 – 26 February 1936) was Mayor of Toronto from January 1924 – January 1925. During his term, he introduced time clocks for Toronto city workers. He was also a member of the Orange Order in Canada. He had a son and grandson, with the same names.

== Ancestry ==
Hiltz descended from the Hilts families that immigrated to the New World around 1710 presumably from the Palatinate region of Germany because of the wars and famine. The family farmed on the Burnetsfield Patent in Herkimer County, New York. During the American Revolution in 1779, William Hiltz father, Joseph Hilts was brought as a small child by his grandfather, Joseph Petrie, who was forced to flee to the Province of Quebec, settling in the Niagara Peninsula in Louth Township. Joseph Hilts' sons later received land grants, with William Hilts receiving one in Esquesing Township, and Edward Thompson Hilts receiving one in Erin Township.

== Early life ==
Hiltz was born and raised in Erin at Ballinafad, attending Georgetown District High School in Georgetown, Ontario and Brampton High School in Brampton. He married Annie Laidlaw on Christmas Day in 1899.

He began his career as a teacher, eventually becoming principal of Weston Collegiate Institute in 1899, and in 1901 assistant principal of the Hamilton Street School (now known as Queen Alexandra Middle School). Around that time, he became a building contractor and real estate developer, and quit teaching in 1906 to go into business full-time. During this transition, he had been known to take his students out to the construction sites to dig foundations by shovel. After developing and building over 400 stores and houses east of the Don River by 1920, his real estate properties made him the second-highest taxpayer in Toronto behind Timothy Eaton, the founder of Eaton's.

Hiltz was the Danforth Methodist Church superintendent of the largest Methodist Sunday School in Canada. He was also a leading advocate of the temperance movement and was a member of the Loyal Orange Lodge.

== Political career ==
Offices held by Hiltz
Office	Years
School trustee, Toronto Board of Education	1911–1913 (Chairman in 1913)
Alderman for Ward One, Toronto City Council	1914–1920
Controller, Toronto Board of Control	1921–1923
Mayor of Toronto	1924

During his term as mayor, he actively opposed Adam Beck's plans for a network of Hydro radial lines and instead, he was instrumental in getting plans approved for the construction of an elevated railway viaduct in the downtown core -which assured the final opening of the new Union Station. Hiltz's opposition to Hydro radial lines led to their rejection and also to his defeat in the following mayoral election.

Hiltz died in 1936 at age 63.
