= Herbert Henry Ball =

Canadian politician and journalist

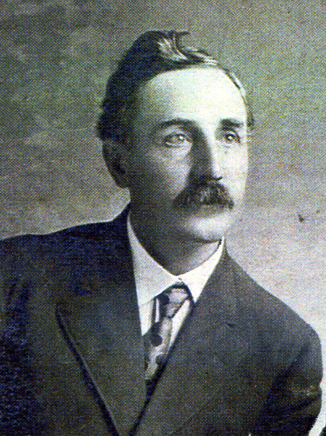

MPP for Eglinton
- In office 1926–1929
- Preceded by: Riding established
- Succeeded by: Alvin Coulter McLean

Toronto Ward 2 (Cabbagetown & Rosedale) Alderman
- In office 1915-1919

Personal details
- Born: September 9, 1863 Bishopsworth, Somerset, England
- Died: February 26, 1943 (aged 79) Toronto, Ontario
- Resting place: Mount Pleasant Cemetery, Toronto
- Party: Conservative
- Spouse: Mary Ann Martin
- Children: 6

Herbert Henry Ball (September 9, 1863 - February 26, 1943) was a Canadian politician and journalist.

On October 24, 1885, he married Mary Ann Martin in Bristol, Somerset, England. In 1886, Ball and his wife emigrated to Canada, settling north of Toronto in an area then known as Davisville. In the mid-1890s, he began to work as a journalist for the Toronto World newspaper, and remained with the paper until it terminated operation in 1921. During that time, he rose through its ranks to become financial editor.

In 1915, Ball was elected as an Alderman for the city of Toronto for Ward 2 (Cabbagetown and Rosedale), a position he held until 1919. Ball ran twice for the Board of Control. In the 1926 Ontario General Election, he ran and was elected as a Conservative in the Eglinton riding of Toronto. Until 1929, he served in the 17th Legislative Assembly of Ontario as led by George Howard Ferguson.

On January 29, 1930, it was announced that Ball had been nominated to the position of King's Printer, effective February 1, 1930. He held this position until he was terminated by the Liberal government of Mitchell Hepburn. He was relieved of his duties on August 31, 1934.

Ball maintained a home at 1817 Yonge Street. He and his wife were the parents of six children: Edith Elizabeth (Mrs. Frank Stocker); Ernest George Henry; Herbert Eldridge; Winnifred Mildred (Mrs. Cecil H. Knowlton); Hilda Marion (Mrs. Oliver W. Elmore); and Colston Robert Ball. Ball died in Toronto on February 26, 1943. He is buried in Mount Pleasant Cemetery, Toronto.

Herbert Henry Ball was the great-great-granduncle of English football goalkeeper Mike Hooper.
