= Joseph Gibbons (Toronto politician) =

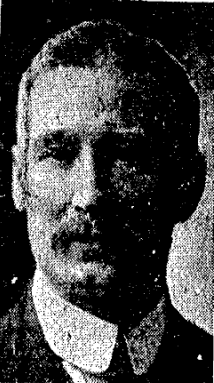
Gibbons in 1921

Joseph Gibbons (died February 17, 1946) was a municipal politician in Toronto, Ontario, Canada. He was born on a farm outside of Waterloo, Ontario and moved to Toronto in the 1890s. There he found work as a streetcar driver. He first piloted the horse-drawn streetcars up Yonge Street and then served for fifteen years as a driver on the Belt Line. He became active in the driver's union, rising to a leadership position.

He was elected to Toronto City Council, and served there for four years before being elected to the powerful Board of Control. On council he was the foremost representative of organized labour in city politics. His main campaign was for public ownership of utilities. He was central to the creation of the Toronto Transit Commission, bringing the previously privately owned streetcars under city control. He was a close friend of Adam Beck, and worked with him to bring publicly run electricity to the province. He was also a Catholic, and long the only Catholic member of the Board of Control. He was able to win significant support from Protestants over his career, a rare event in the sectarian politics of the staunchly Protestant city.

He served on the Board of Control for ten years until 1929 when he resigned to be appointed a Toronto Hydro commissioner. He served on the commission until his death in 1946.
