= Charles A. Maguire =

Canadian politician (1875–1949)

C. Alfred Maguire
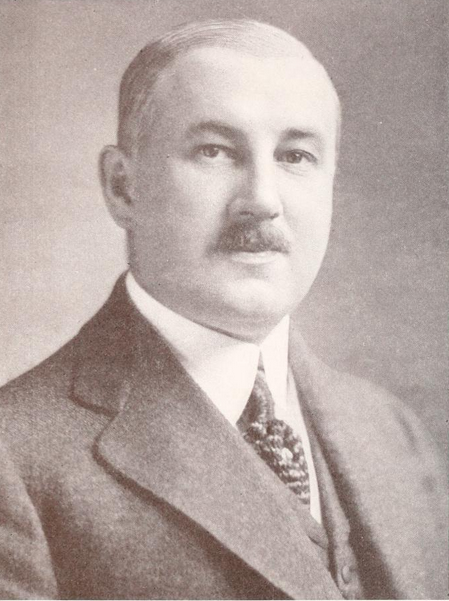

38th Mayor of Toronto
- In office 1922–1923
- Preceded by: Thomas Church
- Succeeded by: William Hiltz

Personal details
- Born: Charles Alfred Maguire; May 24, 1875; Toronto, Ontario
- Died: October 14, 1949 (aged 74)
- Spouse: Lillian Cusack
- Children: 1

Charles Alfred Maguire (May 24, 1875 – October 14, 1949) was mayor of Toronto from 1922–1923.

Charles Alfred Maguire was born in Toronto, the son of James Maguire and Elizabeth Brown.

Maguire worked in an insurance company (Maguie & Company) and was the vice-president of the Hydro-Electric Railway Association before he entered politics. He was also a member of the Orange Order in Canada. He was first elected an alderman for Ward Three in the year 1909 and reelected in 1910, 1911, 1912, 1914, 1915, 1916 and 1917. In 1912 he was city controller for part of the year. He was reelected in 1918, 1919, 1920 and 1921. Then on December 21, 1921 he was elected by acclamation mayor of Toronto. His program included building hydro radials, building of a railway viaduct on the water front, low tax rates, street extensions and city improvement.

In 1923 Robert John Fleming contested Maguire for mayor. Maguire was reelected.

== Personal life ==
Married Lillian Cusack, the daughter of Henry M. Cusack and Elizabeth Cusack of London on February 9, 1900. His son was Herbert Maguire born on April 13, 1910.
