= R.H. Cameron =

Toronto city councillor

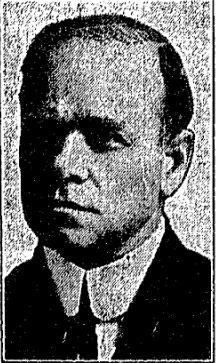
R.H. Cameron

Robert Henderson Cameron (March 27, 1867-1949) was a Toronto manufacturer and politician. He was born in Aberdeen, Scotland in 1867 and came to Canada as a child with his family in the early 1869.

Cameron entered the manufacturing industry and was proprietor of Leather Goods Limited. He was first elected to Toronto City Council in 1914 as Alderman for Ward 4 (The Annex, Kensington Market and Garment District) and was first elected to the Toronto Board of Control in 1916. He ran for Mayor of Toronto in 1918 but was defeated by Tommy Church and returned to the Board of Control in the 1919 election and was re-elected in 1920. He lost his seat on the Board in 1921 and failed in his attempt to regain it in 1922 before returning to City Council as Alderman for Ward 4 in the 1923 municipal election. He was returned to the Board of Control in 1924, was defeated in 1925 and in 1926 again ran for Mayor but was defeated by Thomas Foster by a margin of just under 10,000 votes. He attempted to return to the Board of Control in 1929 but was defeated. Cameron returned to his business and died in Jefferson County, Florida in February 1949.
