= Niagara, Toronto =

Niagara
- Neighbourhood
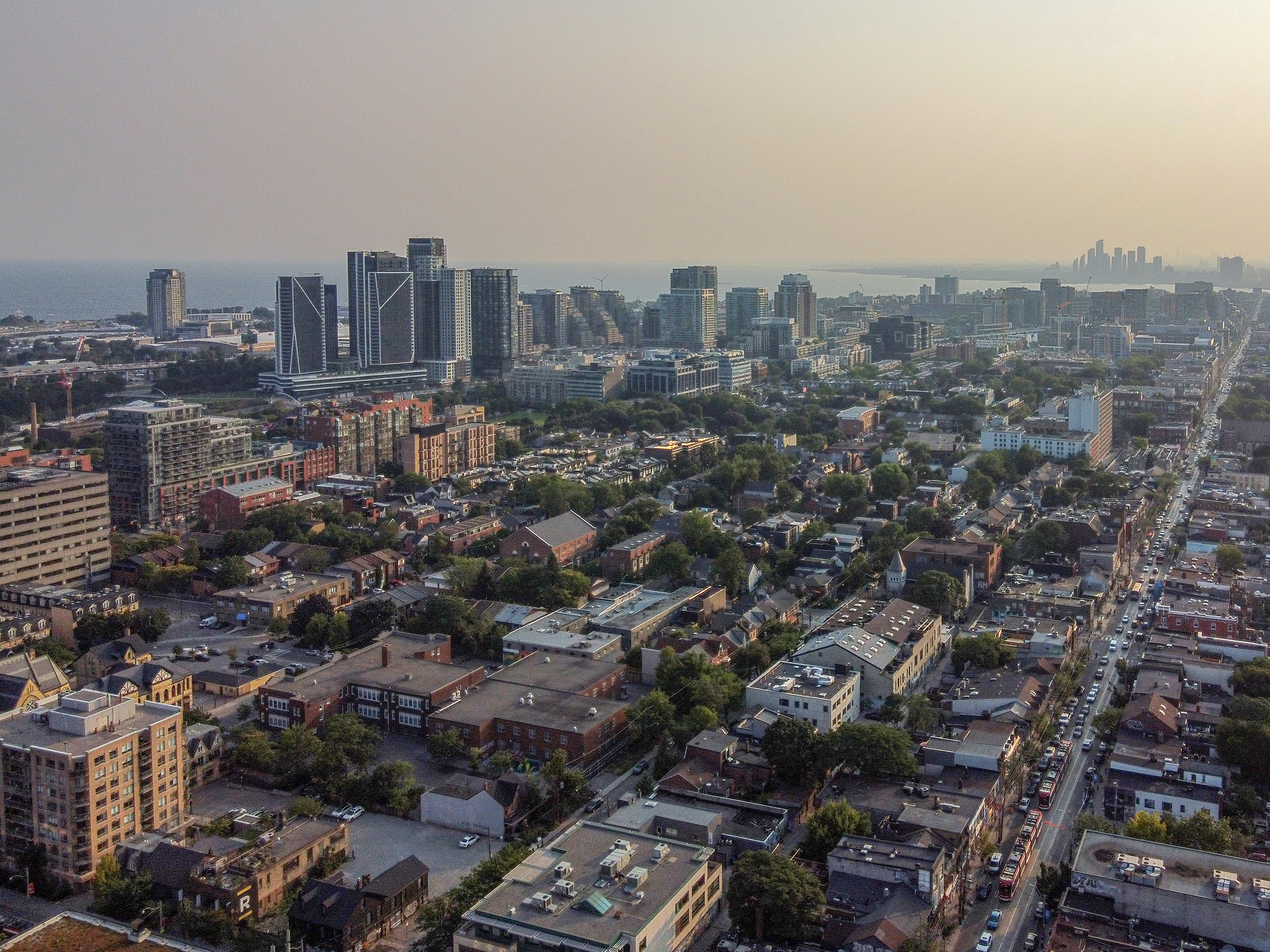
- Aerial view of Niagara, Toronto in 2025

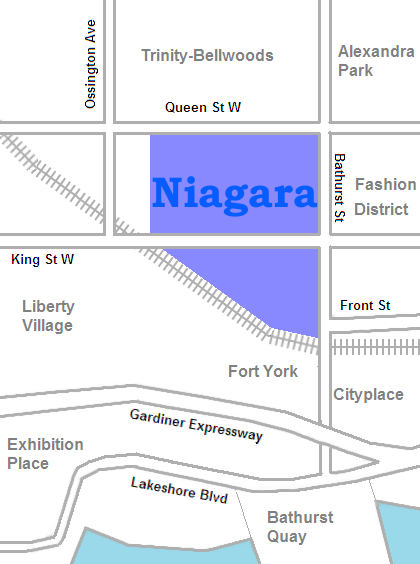
- Neighbourhood map

- Location within Toronto
- Coordinates: 43.643°N 79.408°W
- Country: Canada
- Province: Ontario
- City: Toronto

Government
  - City Councillor: Ausma Malik
  - Federal M.P.: Chi Nguyen
  - Provincial M.P.P.: Chris Glover

Area
  - Total: 0.549 km^{2} (0.212 sq mi)

Population (2016)
  - Total: 7,740
  - Density: 14,098/km^{2} (36,510/sq mi)

Niagara is a neighbourhood in Toronto, Ontario, Canada, located south of Queen Street West; it is usually bordered by Strachan Avenue to the west, Bathurst Street to the east, and the railway corridor to the south, and so named because Niagara Street runs through the centre of it. The eastern portion of this area (with what is now called the Fashion District) was first planned as the New Town Extension when Toronto was incorporated as a city. The area was developed as a residential area for the workers of industries located along the CN and CP railway corridors. It remains a working-class neighbourhood that has seen the development of new condominium apartment buildings.

== History ==
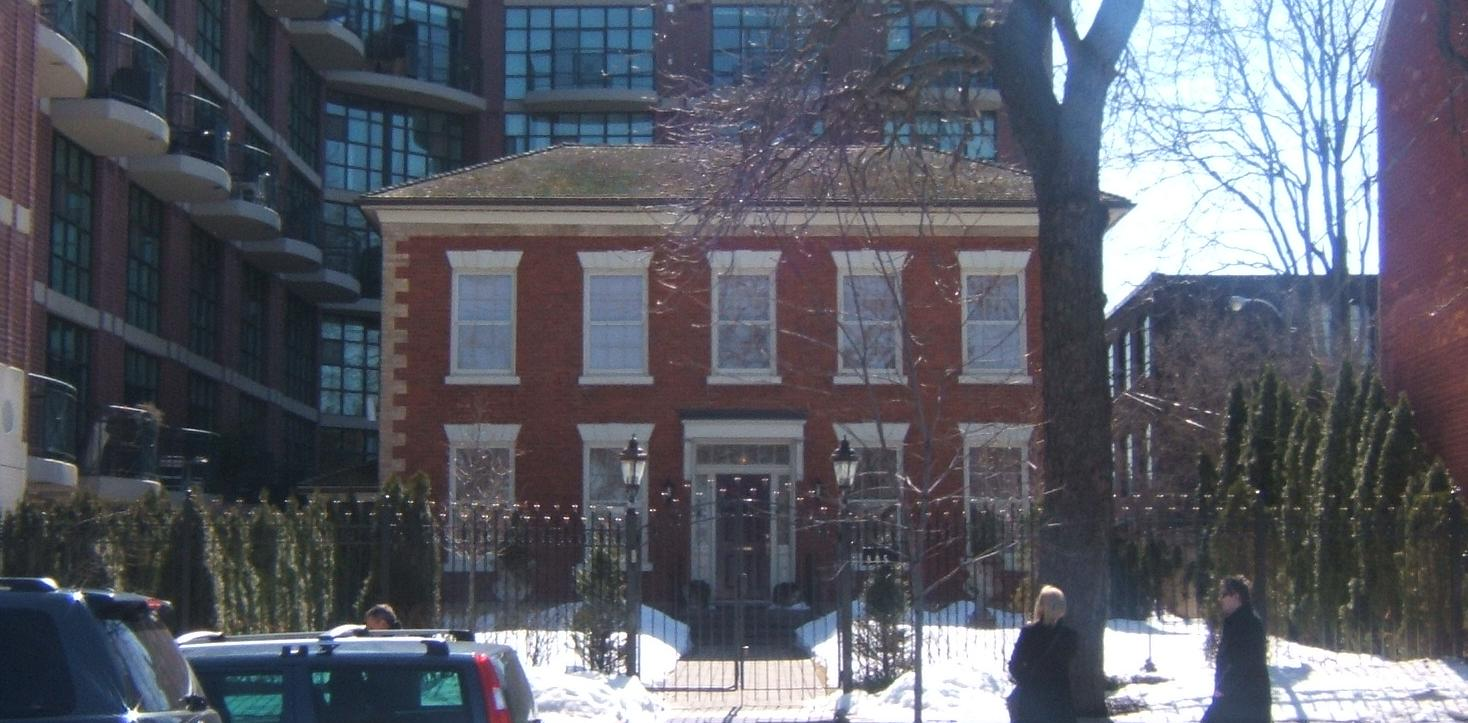
Farr House, 905 Queen Street West

=== Garrison Common ===
The ten block Town of York (later the St. Lawrence Ward of Toronto) was laid out by Governor Simcoe in 1793 with its southernmost street, Palace Street (now Front Street), following the shoreline to the west where it entered Fort York on the west side of the Garrison Creek This original town extended from Jarvis Street to Parliament Street (now Berkeley) with the rest of the area south of Lot Street (now Queen Street) as the 'Garrison Common' (open government land); north of Queen Street were 'farm lots'. North of about Palace Street (Front Street) and Crookshank Lane (Bathurst Street), a burial ground was established for the fort. Just before 1800 the town was extended with a 'New Town' (now the Financial District) in the west using larger lots than in the 'Old Town' and extending from Jarvis Street to Peter Street. There was a military hospital at Niagara Street and Tecumseth across from Fort York.

=== New Town extension and development ===
The 'New Town' grew slowly and it was not until the Town of York was incorporated as the City of Toronto in 1834 that the 'New Town' grid was extended from Peter Street to as far west as the Garrison Creek creating the 'New Town Extension' with its curved Niagara Street, later extended a block closer to the Garrison Creek with Walnut Street.

The 'New Town Extension' was planned with a number of squares: Victoria Square, Clarence Square, McDonell Square and West Market Square. In the West Market Square, St. Andrew's Market was established to rival St. Lawrence Market in the 'Old Town' to the east. Between Victoria Square (including the former Garrison Burial Ground and the garrison chapel) at Bathurst Street and Clarence Square at Brock Street (Spadina Avenue) Wellington Street was planned as a broad 'Wellington Place', likely modelled after similar large boulevards in the planned Capital of the United States, Washington which had been burned during the War of 1812 in return for the American occupation of Toronto. Toronto was divided into 'wards' with much of the 'New Town Extension' in St. Andrew's Ward.

Toronto now extended horizontally from Niagara Street (with the Garrison Creek and Common beyond) to the Don River in the East, the area north of Queen having been planned as large estates. The areas in the extreme west ('New Town Extension') and east ('Corktown') remained largely undeveloped for some time and as poor relief programmes in Britain brought many poor and diseased to Toronto in the following years the empty lots in these areas quickly filled with poorly constructed housing and the land value deteriorated. Several Cholera and Typhoid outbreaks forced the City of Toronto to use these lots to house the sick.

Many of the immigrants to this area were Irish Catholic and Toronto's first Catholic Church to serve the western part of the city was built in McDonell Square: St. Mary's Roman Catholic Church. Most of Toronto's institutions and businesses preferred to remain closer to the central city in land subdivided from former 'Park Lots' north of Queen Street.

=== Residential and industrial development ===
Historical population
Year	Pop.	±%
2006	6,524	—
2011	7,113	+9.0%
2016	7,740	+8.8%

In the 1850s the railway reached Toronto from Hamilton cutting across the Garrison Common and by 1860, more of the Garrison Common west of the Garrison Creek and south of Queen street was subdivided around a 'Strachan Avenue' leading up to Bishop Strachan's Trinity College. Some of the housing in the older St. Andrew's Ward was rebuilt.

At the end of the 19th century Toronto carried out a large number of annexations and planned new grand institutional building north of Queen Street in St. John's Ward (now the Discovery District), this led to the deterioration and demolition of many of Toronto's old institutional buildings south of Queen Street with many of the large lots being sold to the expanding Railways.

Within the former 'New Town Extension', most of the area east of Bathurst Street and south of King Street, especially along 'Wellington Place' became industrial. In the first half of the 20th century many working families immigrated, especially from southern Europe (especially Italy and Portugal), to this neighbourhood. McDonell Square, the site of St. Mary's Roman Catholic Church, was renamed Portugal Square in recognition of the changing demographics.

Toronto Western Cattle Market (c. 1903) and Toronto Municipal Abattoir (c. 1914) operated in the area of Wellington Street West and Walnut Avenue. The former relocated north to the Ontario Stockyards and the latter is now site of Quality Meat Packers.

In recent years, it has seen an explosion of new condominium loft and row house development. The area is located close to the Fashion and Entertainment districts.

==== Gallery ====
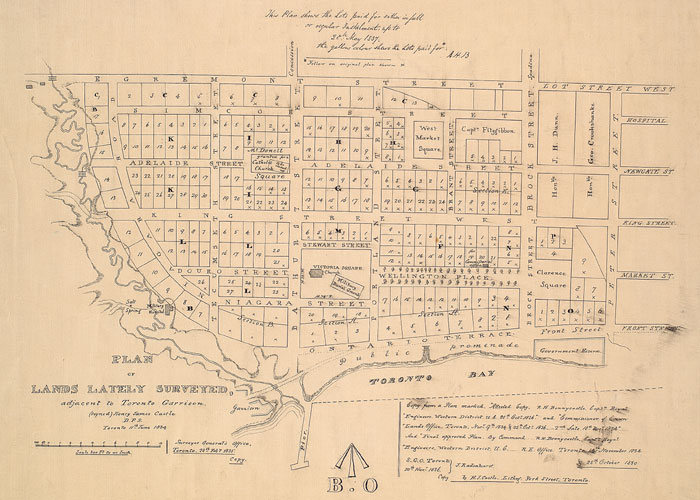
Plans for the "New Town extension" were drafted shortly after York was reincorporated as Toronto, in 1837.

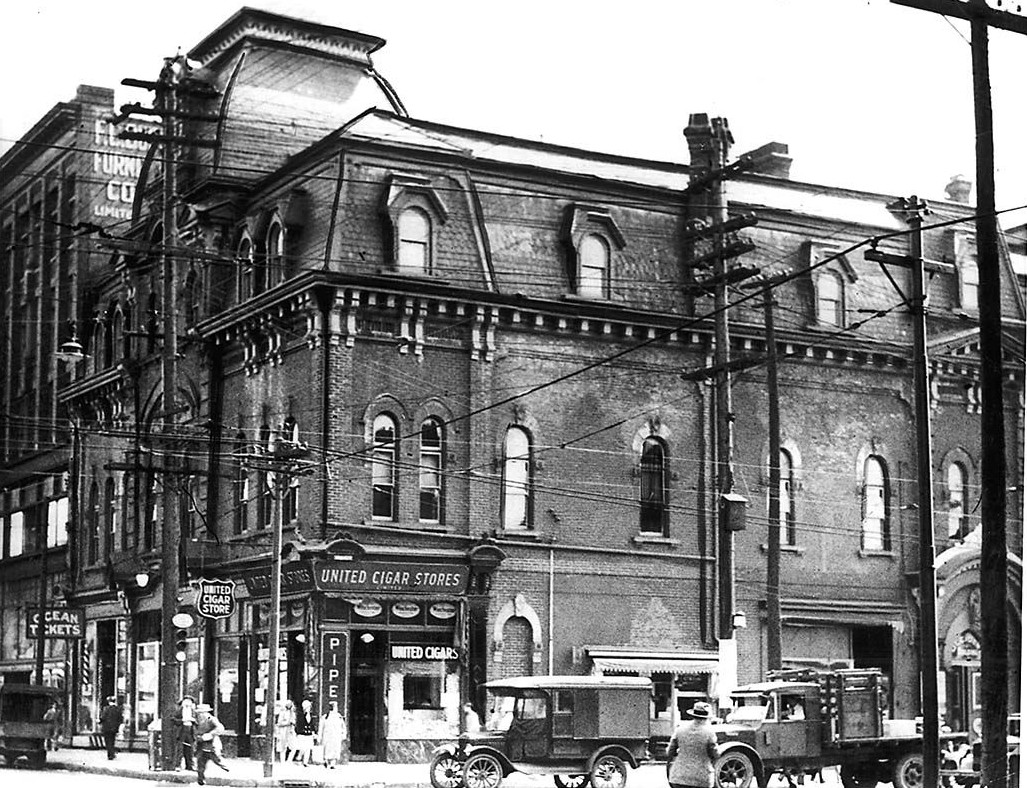
Store fronts in Niagara, 1928.

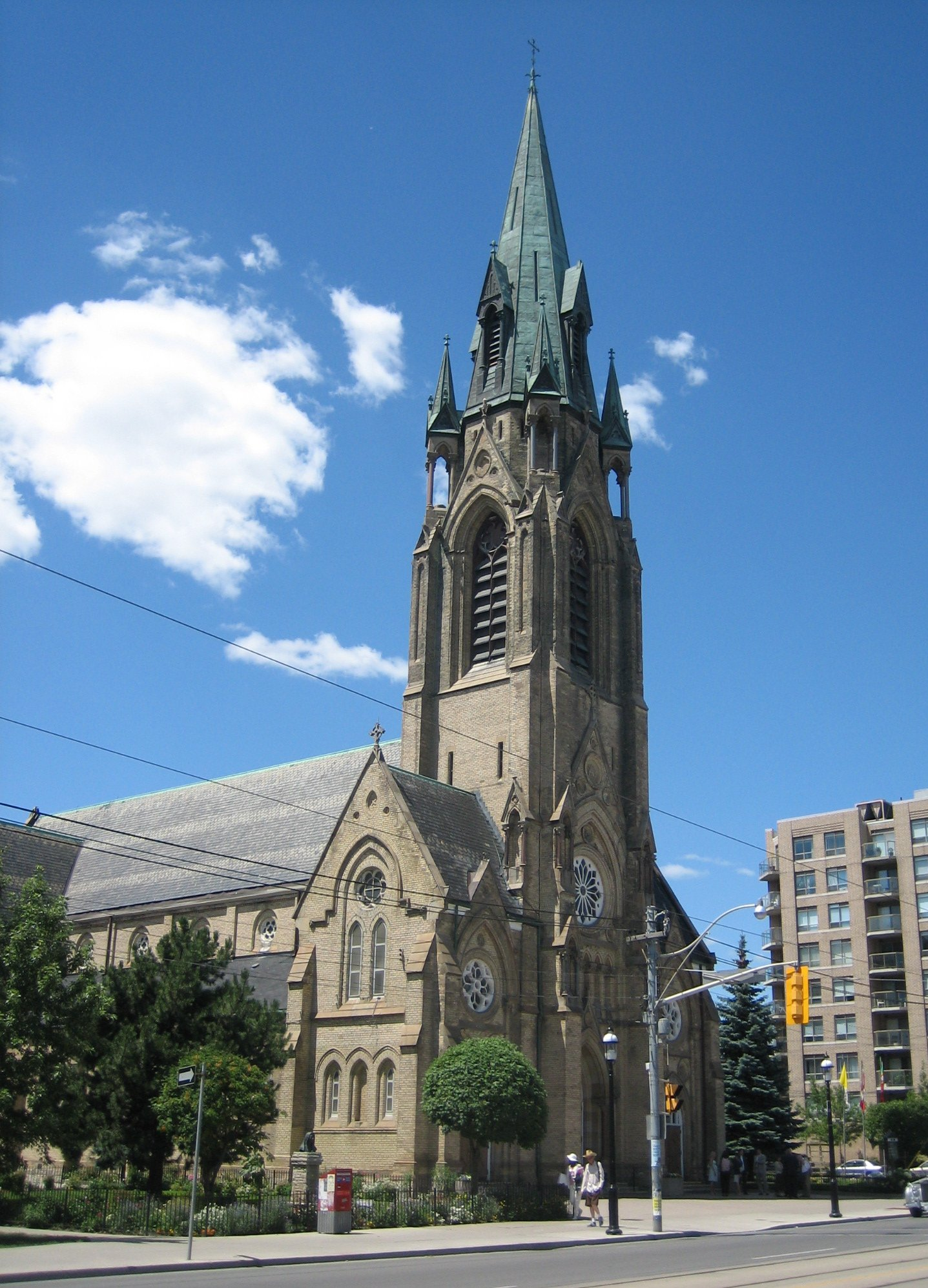
Built in 1852, St. Mary's Church was a Roman Catholic church established to serve Catholic residents in the western portion of the city.

== Public transportation ==
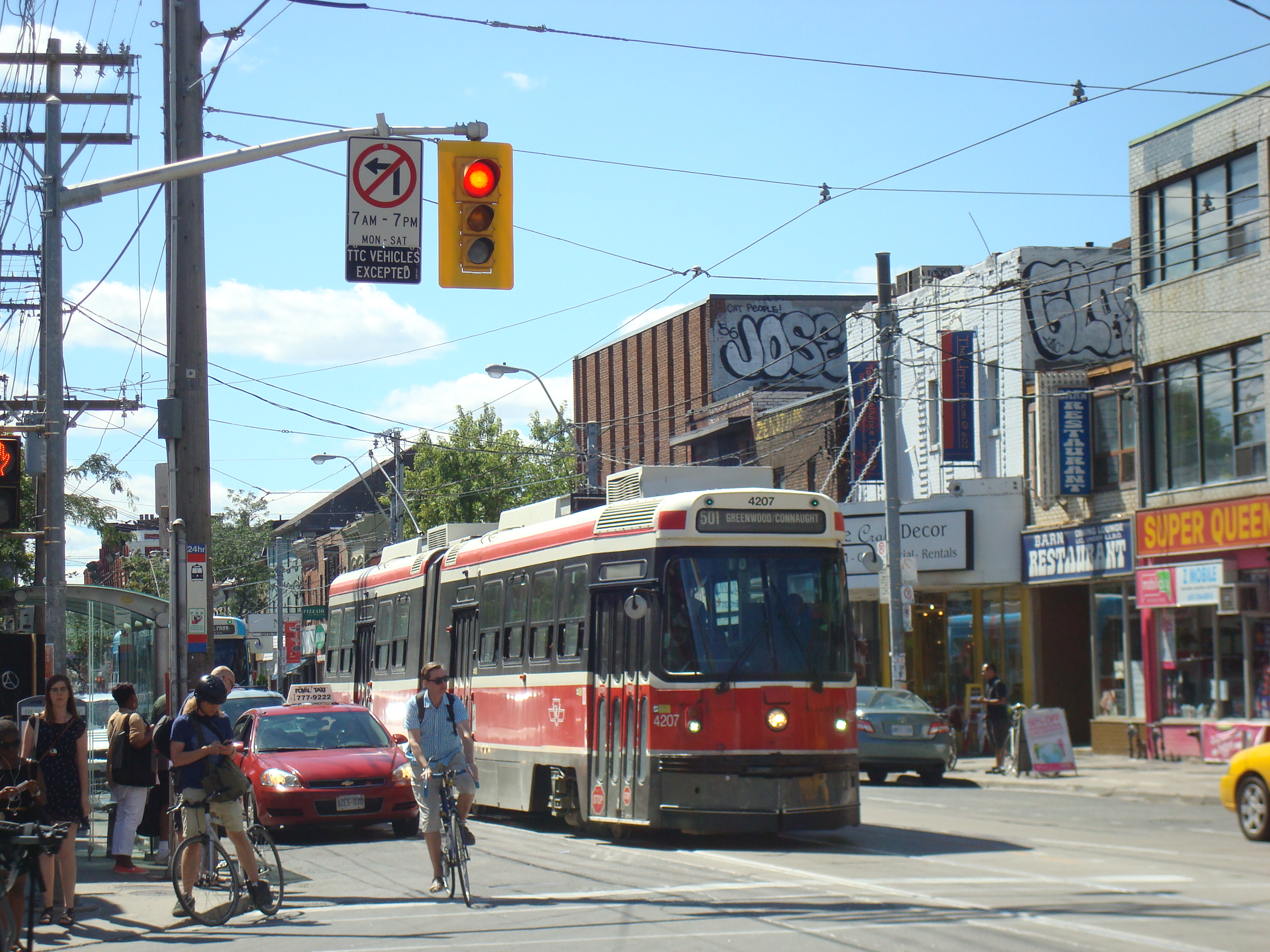
An eastbound 501 Queen streetcar on Bathurst and Queen Street. The 501 Queen runs along the northern boundary of Niagara.

Niagara is well served by public transit. East-west transit is available through the Toronto Transit Commission's 501 Queen and 504 King streetcar, which with an average of 50,000 passengers per day is the busiest surface route in the city's system. North-south transit is available through the 511 Bathurst streetcar and 63 Ossington bus on nearby Shaw St.

=== Main streets ===
Some of the neighbourhood's major streets include:

- Queen Street
- Bathurst Street
- Tecumseth Street
- King Street West
- Wellington Street West
- Niagara Street

== Schools ==
- St. Mary Catholic School is a Roman Catholic elementary school founded in 1852 by the Sisters of St. Joseph and the Christian Brothers. It is one of the oldest parish schools in Toronto. In 1918, the present old building was erected on Adelaide Street. In 1972, the newer section was opened.
- Niagara Street Junior Public School originally built in 1874.
