= Junction Triangle =

- Neighbourhood
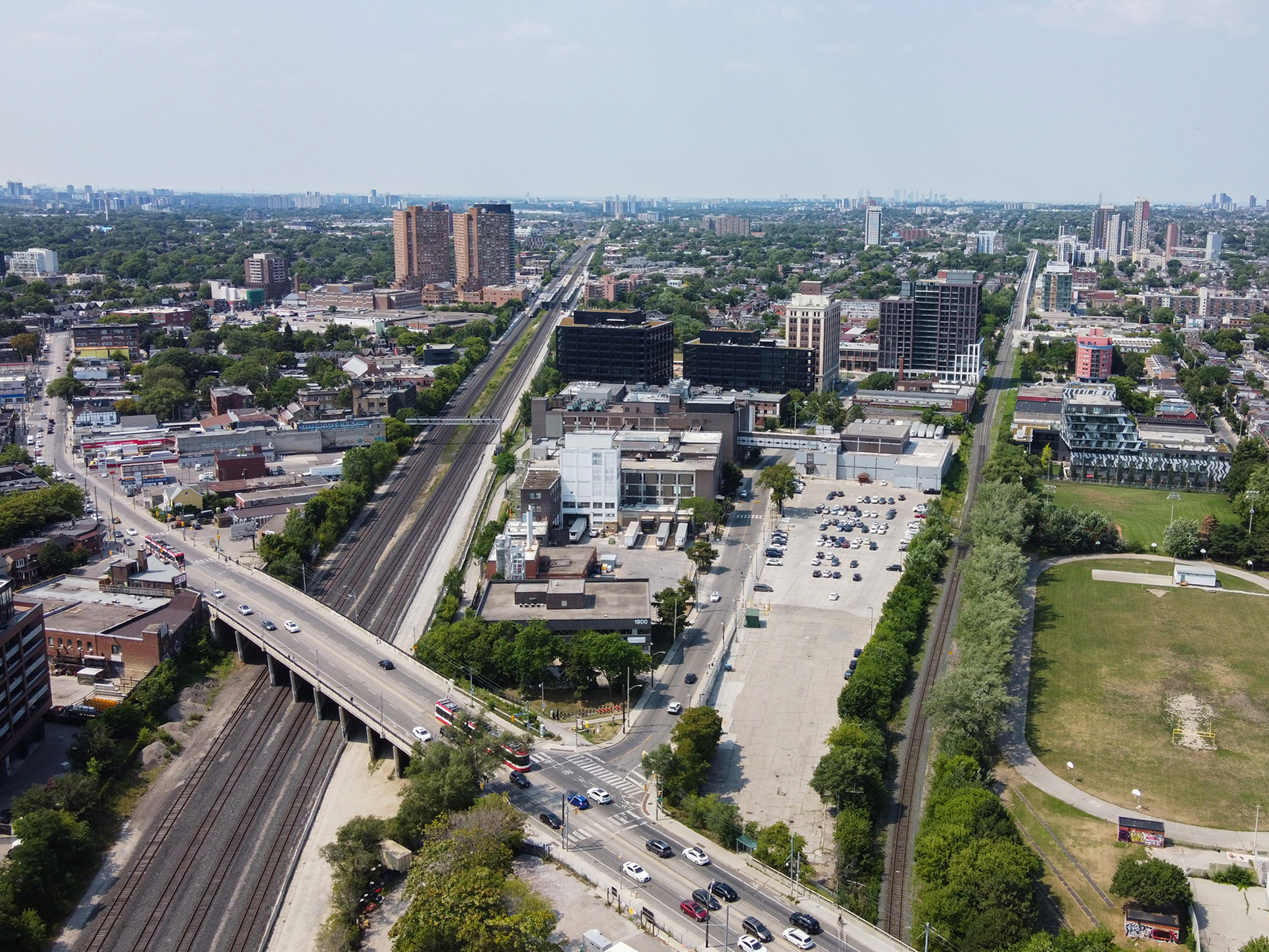
- Aerial view of Junction Triangle in 2025

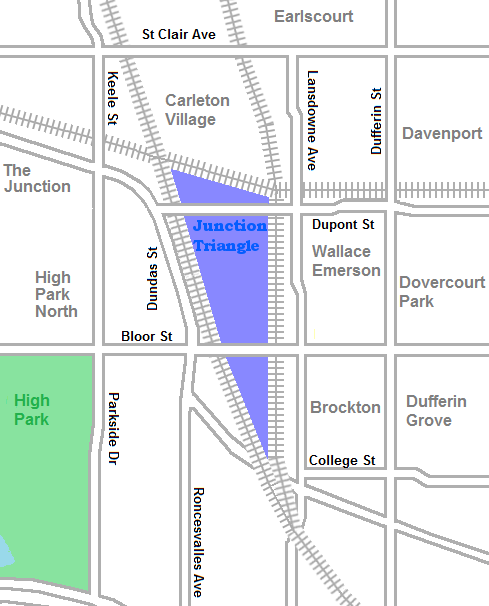
- Neighbourhood map

- Location within Toronto
- Coordinates: 43.659°N 79.446°W
- Country: Canada
- Province: Ontario
- City: Toronto

Government
  - MP: Julie Dzerowicz (Davenport)
  - MPP: Marit Stiles (Davenport)
  - Councillor: Alejandra Bravo (Ward 9 Davenport)

Junction Triangle is a neighbourhood in Toronto, Ontario, Canada. It is located in the city's west end, just west of Lansdowne Avenue. The area is a triangle surrounded on all three sides by railway lines: the CNR/CPR mainline to the west, GO Transit's Barrie line to the east, and the CPR east-west railway lines to the north. Bloor Street cuts across the middle of the neighbourhood, Dupont Street runs close to the northern edge, and Dundas Street is close to the southern boundary. By some accounts, the recent residential developments of Davenport Village and Foundry Lofts, built on former factory lands north of the CP Rail line, west of Lansdowne, south of Davenport and east of the Barrie line, also belong in this neighbourhood, but they are actually in the old village of Davenport.

== Name ==
When a portion of farmland north of Bloor Street went up for sale in 1887 by the Toronto Land and Investment Corporation, it was in a unique triangular shape and since it was close enough to the West Toronto Junction, people referred to it as the Junction Triangle years later especially when people living in the area wanted to identify with their neighbourhood but it was never an official name or village, or had any official boundaries.

In 2009, an effort was launched by locals in the community to find a name. "Junction Triangle" had been used by the city for the area since the 1970s. For demographics purposes the area is part of the Dovercourt-Wallace-Emerson-Junction district. Two local residents associations are called the South Junction Triangle Residents Association and South Junction Triangle Grows. One issue is that it is based on the nearby and much better known neighbourhood The Junction, and leads to frequent confusion. The area was also never part of the historic town of West Toronto Junction, but was called the Town of West Toronto, before annexation.

The Fuzzy Boundaries project was created to try to find a new name. A vote was held in March 2010. Some 230 options were submitted originally, and after a narrowing process the vote was between ten options. The final vote was:

- Junction Triangle - 46.6%
- Perth Park (after the park at the centre of the area) - 27.6%
- Black Oak Triangle (after the Eastern Black oaks that covered the area before settlers arrived) - 26.0%
- East Junction - 25.8%
- The Wedge - 25.5%
- The Triangle - 25.2%
- Railtown - 23.7%
- Railpath (after the West Toronto Railpath) - 23.4%
- Rail District - 23.0%
- South Junction Triangle - 22.7%

== History ==
Historically the area was a centre for industry. The thin wedge of the triangle south of Bloor Street was almost entirely industrial lands, and industrial areas also lined the railway tracks that surround the neighbourhood. Factories made paint, ceramics, and chemicals in the area. The Ontario Stock Yards were also nearby. The area became home to the workers in the factories; by the 1950s this was a multicultural group of mainly Italian, Polish, and Macedonian immigrants. Later, the area became predominantly Portuguese with mass immigration from the Azores and the exodus of better-off Italian families to the northern suburbs such as Vaughan.

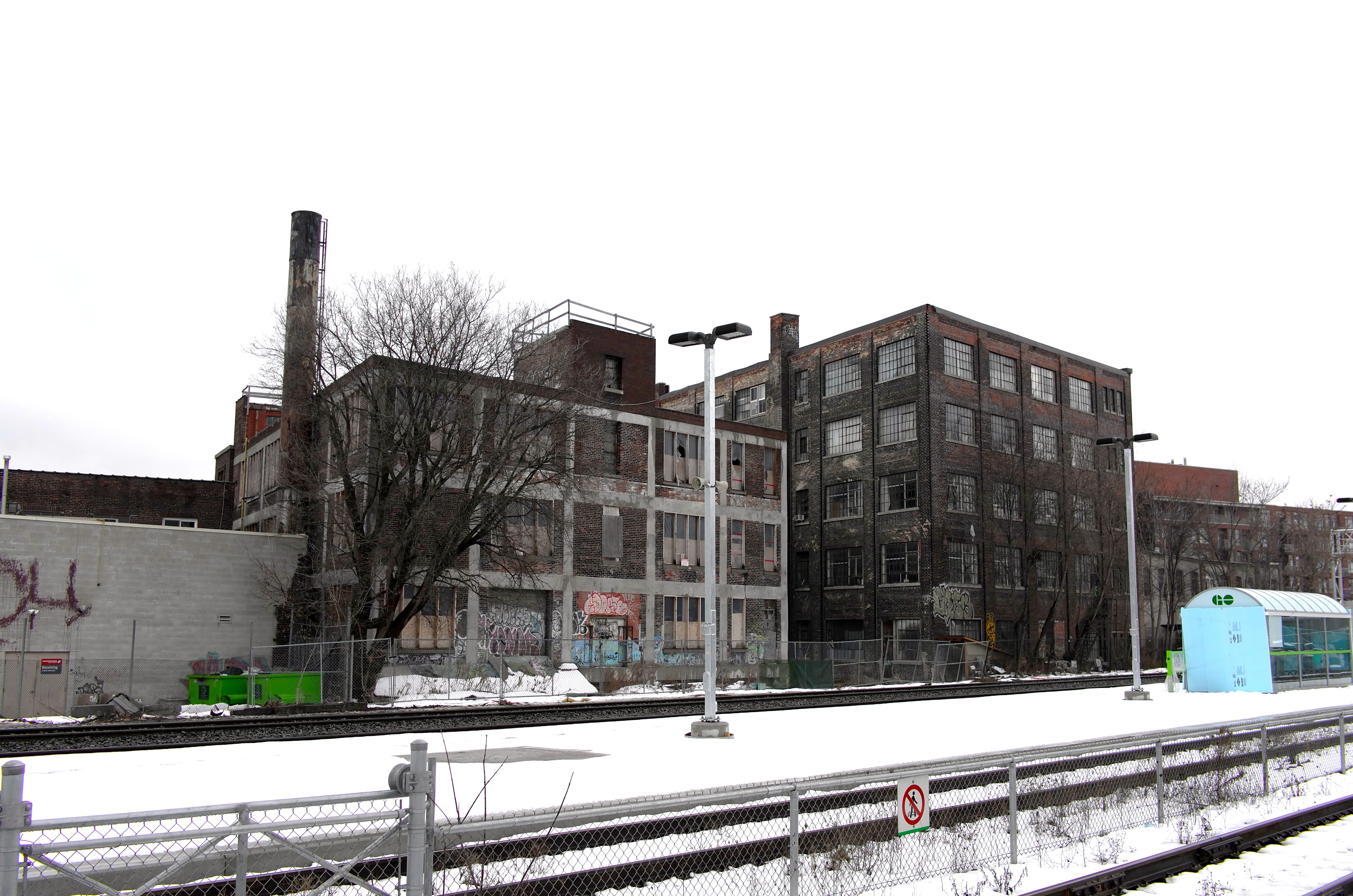
Warehouses next to Bloor GO Station in Junction Triangle. The area was historically an industrial area.

Beginning in the 1970s, local residents became concerned by pollution in the area. The proximity of homes and schools to heavy industry led to a long battle between residents and factory owners. The fumes from the plants were clearly detectable, and studies found elevated levels of a number of organic chemicals in the area's air. In July 1988 an explosion at a glue factory showered the neighbourhood with a yellow chemical rain. Residents blamed a series of ailments on the pollution, though studies found that cancer rates were normal.

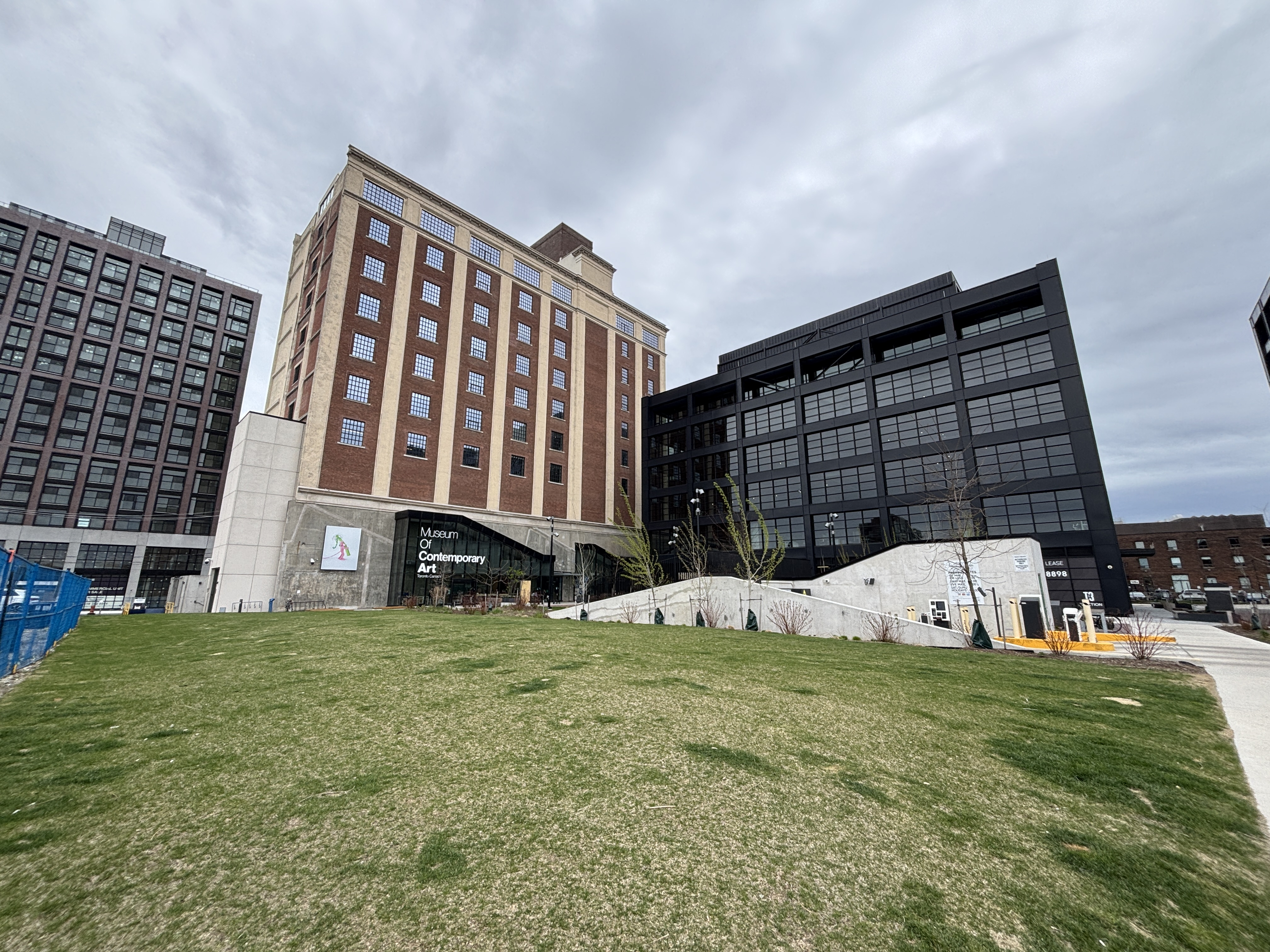
The Museum of Contemporary Art Toronto, located in a repurposed aluminum factory originally built in 1919. Junction Triangle saw a number of factories move from the area in the 1990s.

In response, the city and other levels of government began fining firms that violated environmental regulations, and zoning restrictions were put in place to prevent factories from expanding. Beginning in the 1990s these policies, combined with the general deindustrialization of North America, saw many of the factories in the area close, especially the most polluting ones. Former plants have been converted to lofts, and others have been demolished, leaving large brownfields. Some major factories do remain, notably the Nestlé factory at 72 Sterling Road (second largest Smarties production facility outside of Germany) that some days gives a strong chocolate smell to the area. The character of the neighbourhood has also started to change, as increasingly young downtown professionals taking full advantage of the area's multitude of public-transit and other social amenities (cycling paths) are replacing the retired factory workers of previous years. However, Portuguese community influence remains strong, and to a lesser extent Italian.

The area is attracting young families, artists, creative workers, young professionals, and first-time buyers. The neighborhood is located near Roncesvalles and Brockton, with access to subways, transit options, and nearby commercial areas.

It's been considered 'Junction Triangle the next Liberty Village' but concluded it's much more family friendly with a large portion of family homes to balance the future brownfield developments that are rapidly coming, the area residents are very actively involved with the planning processes to ensure the charm of area remains with the influx of development.

== Demographics ==
Census tract 0098.00 of the 2006 Canadian census overlaps exactly with the residential portion of Junction Triangle. According to that census, the neighbourhood has 6,666 residents. Average income is 28,067, a good deal below the Toronto average. The ten most common language spoken at home are:

- English - 65.0%
- Portuguese - 13.0%
- Spanish - 4.8%
- Vietnamese - 3.5%
- Cantonese - 2.5%
- Italian - 2.1%
- Greek - 0.9%
- French - 0.7%
- Gujarati - 0.7%
- Polish - 0.5%

== Recreation ==
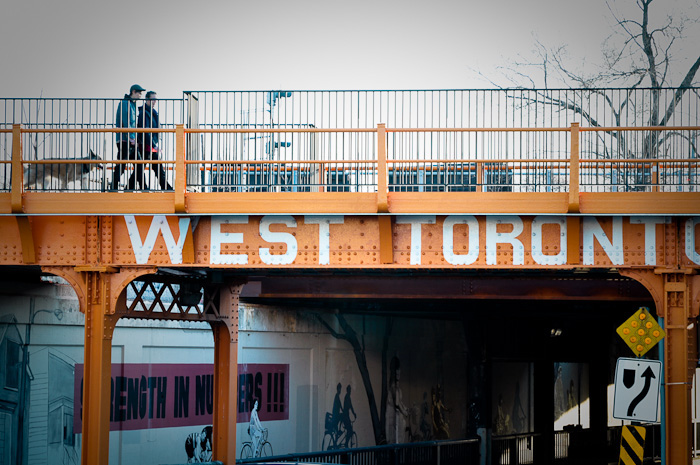
The West Toronto Railpath is a multi-use asphalt trail that runs through the western edge of Junction Triangle.

The Junction Triangle contains Campbell Park and Campbell Rink located just west of Lansdowne, north of Wallace at 255 Campbell Avenue. The Rink has a single pad, and is one of several outdoor compressor-cooled rinks in Toronto, with programming provided through Toronto's Parks and Recreation department. There is a clubhouse with a community kitchen, pay-what-you-can snack bar run by city staff, a skating lending program. In spring the park has community events including community campfires run by staff during the skating season, and in the summer local children can use the wading pool with qualified staff providing first aid.

The West Toronto Railpath presently runs through the Junction Triangle and GO Transit is about to start the construction of a MobilityHub at Bloor St and the western border of neighbourhood. Toronto Life magazine has named this extended area one BuyNow neighbourhood due to its price affordability and proximity to downtown & transit.
