= William Conway Keele =

Canadian lawyer

- Born: 1798; Southampton, England
- Died: 1872 (aged 73–74); Toronto, Ontario, Canada
- Occupation: lawyer

William Conway Keele (1798–1872) was a lawyer, author and farmer in the 19th century and is the namesake for Toronto's Keele Street. Born in Southampton, England, he emigrated to Canada in 1832 and moved with his wife Anne-Sophia (née Moore) and five children to York, Upper Canada (later Toronto).

While Keele practised law in Toronto, he authored a number of legal books: The Provincial Justice, or Magistrate's Manual (Toronto, 1835; 5th ed., 1864); A Brief View of the Township Laws Up to the Present Time (Toronto, 1835); and A Brief View of the Laws of Upper Canada Up to the Present Time... (Toronto, 1844).

By the mid-1830s, he bought rural lands northwest of the city of Toronto, and south of the railway village of Carlton. There, he resided with his second wife Mary (née Cleaver) with whom he had one surviving son, Charles Conway. In the following decades, he leased the land for hunting and horse racing, where the Toronto Turf Club established its operations in 1857. The track, then known as the Carlton race course, became the home for the Queen's Plate. The racing event was held in Keele's property for four years from 1860 to 1863.

William Conway Keele died on July 11, 1872. After he died, Keele's property was sold to Daniel Webster Clendenan who subdivided the lands and helped develop the village into West Toronto Junction. The north–south road west of his estate was named Keele Street in his honour.
