= Daniel Webster Clendenan =

Canadian politician

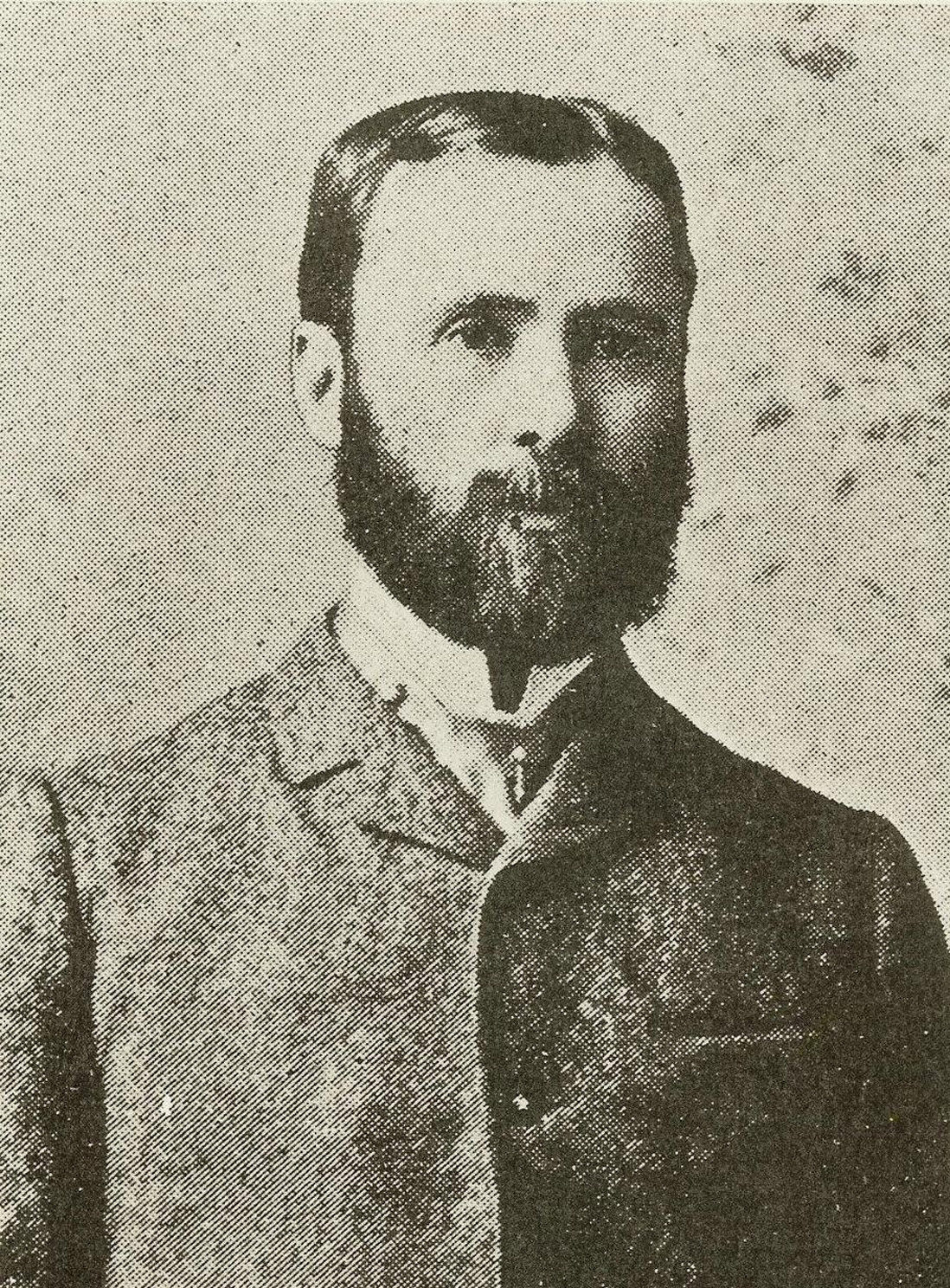
- Photograph of Clendenan, c. 1891
- Born: 1851; Detroit, Michigan
- Died: 1913 (aged 61–62); Lincoln, Nebraska
- Occupation: barrister

Daniel Webster Clendenan (or Clendennan), commonly known as D. W. Clendenan (1851–1913) was a US-born, Canadian barrister and land speculator who founded the village of West Toronto Junction. He became the first mayor of the town of the Junction and is namesake for a local street.

Born in Detroit, Michigan to travelling ministers of the Disciples of Christ Church, he lived in Toronto but later moved to various cities where his father was called to preach. He returned to Canada to study law. In 1876, after graduation, he was called to the bar and soon joined a law firm downtown Toronto. He eventually moved to the city's western outskirts with his wife Clarinda (née McMillan). In 1882, through business partnership, D. W. Clendenan purchased tracts of land from William Conway Keele in anticipation of the completion of the intercity suburban rail lines.

Clendenan subdivided the Keele estate, site of the former Carlton Race Course, into lots for sale. The village, then known as West Toronto Junction after the Canadian Pacific Railways station, rapidly grew in population and industrialized. In 1885, he was elected deputy reeve and became reeve of the village three years later. He also served as chairman of the school board. By spring of 1889, the village was chartered into a town. Clendenan was elected as the founding mayor of Toronto Junction. A Conservative-Equal Rights politician, he became a prominent early figure before the Junction was amalgamated into the city of Toronto.

By the late 1890s, he relocated to the US after he was involved in a domestic affairs scandal that broke in public. He continued to work as a lawyer in Nebraska, where he married again and had a son. In 1913, Clendenan died in Lincoln, Nebraska at 61 years old. He was buried in Wyuka Cemetery. In his lifetime, while facing court charges, Clendenan's cousin Dr. George Washington Cledenan served as mayor of the Junction. Clendenan Avenue, running north–south from the Canadian Pacific tracks to Bloor Street and ending at the northwest corner of High Park, continues to bear the family's name.
