= Don Mills Trail =

Cycling and walking trail in Toronto

Coordinates: 43°44′06″N 79°21′16″W

Don Mills Trail a.k.a. Leaside Spur Trail
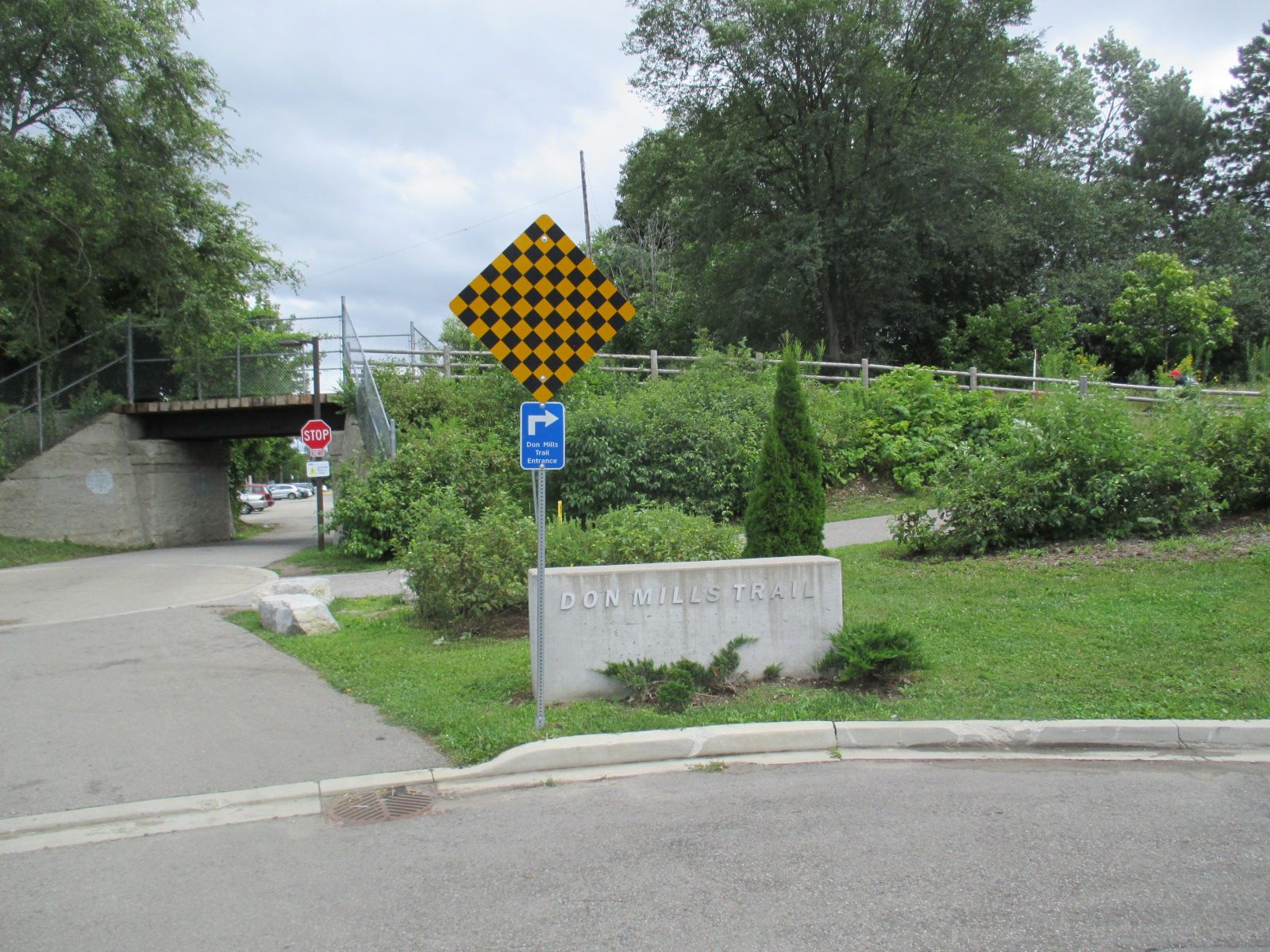
- Bond Avenue entrance to the trail
- Length: 3 km (1.9 mi)
- Location: east of Leslie Street from Bond Park to just north of Eglinton Avenue East
- Trailheads: To York Mills Road and 1 km south of Overland Drive
- Use: cycling and walking
- Season: Year-round
- Website: Don Mills Trail

The Don Mills Trail (also known as the Leaside Spur Trail) is a 3-kilometre (1.9 mi) cycling and walking trail in Toronto, Ontario, Canada. The trail runs south from York Mills Road, east of and roughly parallel to Leslie Street. The city built the trail on the roadbed of a former railway line, known as the Leaside Spur.

The trail is situated within the Don Mills neighbourhood of Toronto. None of the trail is within Leaside, although that was the destination of trains that used the former Leaside Spur. The Don Mills Trail is not to be confused with the Lower Don Trail, also within Toronto.

== Description ==
The trail starts at the intersection of York Mills Road and Scarsdale Road and ends in a dead-end about 1.1 kilometres (0.68 mi) south of Overland Drive. Most of the trail runs between residential areas while the southern portion is bordered by industrial and commercial properties, following the roadbed of a former railway line. At the north end, just south of the bridge at York Mills Road, the trail runs parallel to the still-active tracks of the Canadian National Railway (CNR) Bala Division. At the south end, the trail stops a short distance from the tracks of the Canadian Pacific Railway (CPR) Belleville Subdivision, which are fenced off from the trail.

There are ornamental circles in the pavement where the trail intersects a street or a cross-trail, including circles at Talwood Park, Lawrence Avenue East (north and south side) and Overland Drive. Some of the circles contain two embedded parallel rails as a reminder of the trail's railway legacy. In or near the circles there are ornamental bike parking stands. The circles at Talwood Park and Overland Drive each have park benches and a pair of cyclist barriers to force cross bicycle traffic to ride around the circle. The circles at the Lawrence Avenue crossing have seating walls around parts of each circle's circumference, with one wall of each circle bearing the name of the trail. There are traffic signals where the trail crosses Lawrence Avenue.

== History ==
=== Rail ===
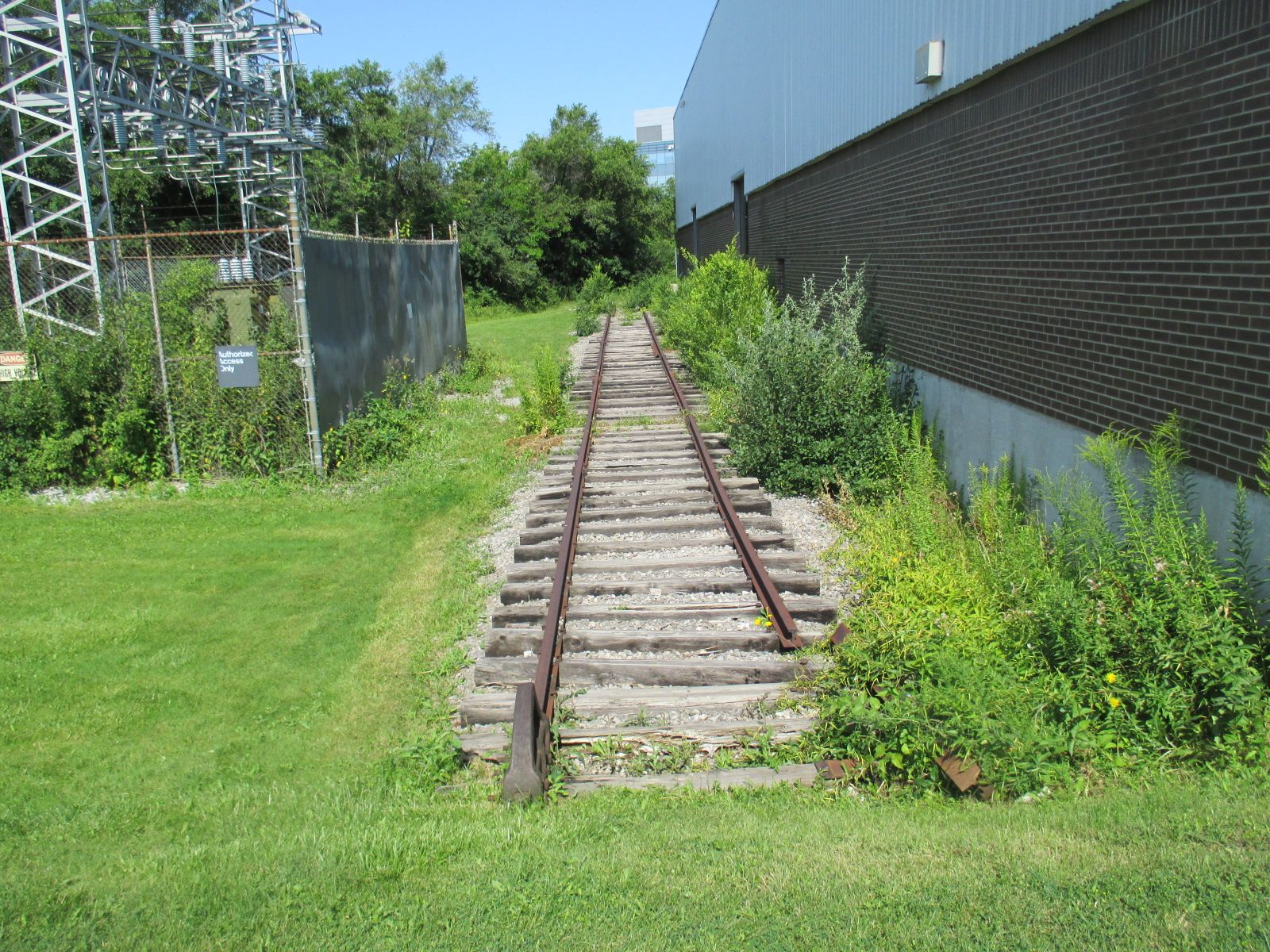
Warehouse siding (at 75 Barber Greene Road) once served by the Leaside Spur (2017 photo)

The trail uses the 100-foot-wide (30 m) roadbed of the Leaside Spur (also known as the Leaside Cutoff and the Oriole Spur), a former railway line that connected Oriole on the CNR Bala Subdivision with Donlands on the CPR Belleville Subdivision. (Oriole is at York Mills Road, and Donlands is about 450 metres north of Eglinton Avenue East.) The Canadian Northern Railway (CNoR) built the line originally to access the CPR North Toronto Station. (However, CNoR/CNR passenger service to North Toronto Station never occurred.) The Leaside Spur opened on February 1, 1918; it was 2.18 miles (3.51 km) long. The CNR purchased the spur in 1918 after the CNoR became financially insolvent.

The Leaside Spur provided access to the CNoR's shop complex at Leaside, which included a roundhouse, a large locomotive shop, a passenger coach shop and other buildings. The complex replaced an engine house in the Don Valley at Rosedale that had limited capacity and was vulnerable to flooding. CNoR trains from downtown to Leaside needed to go north through the Don Valley to Oriole then south on the Leaside Spur. The Leaside locomotive shop opened in 1919, and there was a transfer table between it and the passenger coach shop. With the merger of the CNoR into the CNR, the complex became redundant and was closed in the 1930s. The locomotive shop survives today, and is occupied by Longo's Leaside supermarket on Laird Drive.

The CNR used the Leaside Spur to interchange freight with the CPR and to serve local industries at Leaside using a small yard there. The CNR once had running rights to switch industries on the north side of the CPR midtown line all the way to the TTC's Hillcrest Complex at Bathurst Street. There also used to be a few sidings serving industries along the spur, including one with much of its track still in place as of 2017. See photo.

The CNR abandoned the spur in 1999.

In April 2009, the Province of Ontario purchased the Don Branch (running between downtown Toronto and Leaside). GO Transit was considering rerouting its Richmond Hill line trains over the Don Branch and the Leaside Spur in order to avoid the Bala division south of Oriole which is vulnerable to Don River flooding. The idea was dropped when the City of Toronto purchased it for a key link in the bike trail network, now the Don Mills Trail.

There was one bridge on the Leaside Spur over Bond Avenue; it took 6 years to construct between 1912 and 1918. The abutments are concrete slabs 9.5 ft (2.9 m) high. Six 2-foot-thick (0.61 m) beams span the 15-foot-wide (4.6 m) opening, spaced to handle the weight of locomotives and heavily loaded railcars. Sitting on the steel beams were twenty-one 8×8-inch (20×20 cm) railway ties, spaced 4 in (10 cm) apart for drainage. The bridge is now used by the Don Mills Trail.

=== Trail ===
The City of Toronto purchased the right-of-way of the Leaside Spur in late 2001. By 2010, the City of Toronto was holding public sessions for the design of the trail.

Because of its deteriorating condition, the bridge over Bond Avenue was threatened with demolition in 2011. Local residents pushed to give it a heritage designation in order to preserve it.

By October 2011, the paving of the trail and the installation of park features were nearing completion, as was the installation of traffic lights where the trail crosses Lawrence Avenue East. An exception was the trail north of Bond Avenue. Scarsdale Road, running roughly parallel to the incomplete portion of the trail, was designated as Toronto Bike Trail 45, for cyclists.

On August 2, 2017, the northern part of trail between Bond Avenue and York Mills Road was opened, though that portion of the trail was not fully completed until about October 2016.

As of 2017, the southern end of the trail ends at a dead-end about 60 metres (200 ft) north of the CPR line. Providing an exit at the southern end to Leslie Street depends on a commercial/industrial landowner agreeing to provide access over private land. As of October 2016, there was no deal to grant such access, after a landowner backed out of a tentative agreement.

== Other Toronto railpaths ==
- Beltline Trail
- West Toronto Railpath

== See also ==
- List of trails in Canada
