= St. Mary's Church (Toronto) =

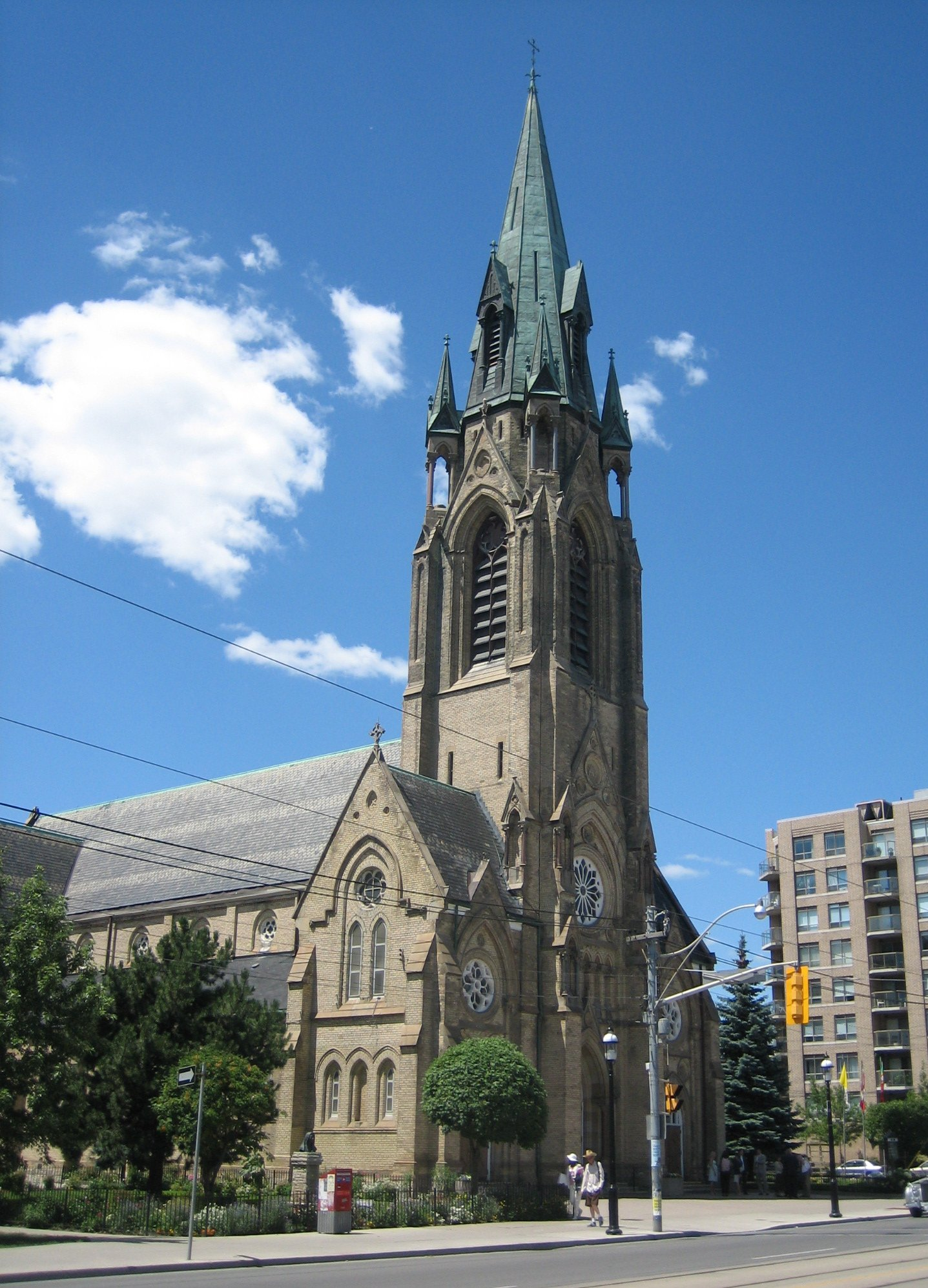
- St. Mary's Church
- 43.645143°N 79.403488°W
- Location: Toronto, Ontario, Canada
- Denomination: Roman Catholic
- Website: stmarysbathurst.archtoronto.org

History
- Founded: 1852

Administration
- Diocese: Archdiocese of Toronto

Clergy
- Pastor: Rev. Msgr. Fernando Couto

St. Mary's Church is a Roman Catholic church located at 130 Bathurst Street at Portugal Square in the Niagara neighbourhood of Toronto, Ontario, Canada. The parish was established by Irish immigrants in 1852. The Gothic Revival church was designed by Joseph Connolly and completed in 1889, with the tower finished in 1905. It stands as the picturesque western view terminus for Adelaide Street.

The rectory, convent and a school are also located along Portugal Square.

== History ==
St. Mary's Church was built at McDonnell Square (now Portugal Square), which was one of several squares laid out in Toronto's 1834 'New Town Extension' plan such as Victoria Square, Clarence Square, and West Market Square. When Bishop Alexander Macdonell asked Lieutenant Governor Sir Francis Bond Head for land to build a church, he was granted a lot (Park Lot 32) on the north east corner of the garrison reserve, given in part due to it having served as an emergency cholera cemetery during the epidemics that hit York (Toronto) in 1832 and 1834. This would only be discovered when the church foundations were being dug and human remains were uncovered. The square was named for McDonell until 1960.

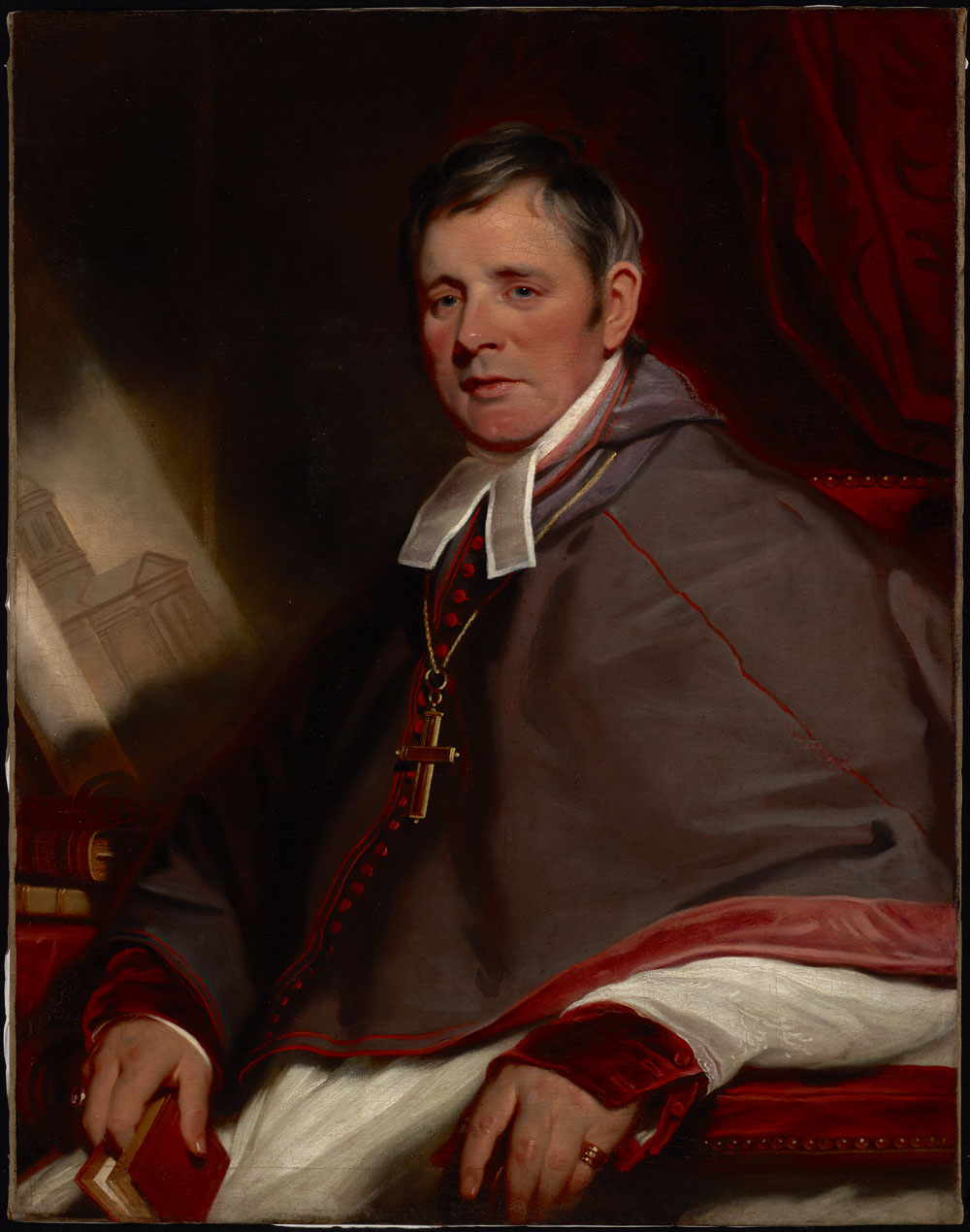
Bishop Alexander Macdonell

The first St. Mary's was a small white brick building erected by Bishop Armand-François-Marie de Charbonnel. However, due to problems with the foundation, this was taken down and a second church constructed on the foundations of the first. It was consecrated by Bishop John Joseph Lynch in May 1860. Eventually, structural problems developed with the second building and John Walsh, Bishop of the Diocese of London, Ontario and a former pastor of St. Mary's, engaged architect Joseph Connolly to design a new church. The cornerstone was laid on 15 August 1881 and the dedication took place on 17 February 1889.

In demolishing the old church, workmen came upon the tomb of Capuchin Father Louis Della Vagna, St. Mary's third pastor. Della Vagna was born in 1801 in Genoa, and before joining the Franciscans at the age of twenty-four, he had worked in his father's counting house and become fluent in English. He preached in France and conducted missions in Ireland. Bishop de Charbonnel had often requested he come to Canada and finally having obtained permission of his superiors, Della Vagna arrived in April 1856. De Charbonnel immediately put him in charge of St. Mary's, but the friar died of an "Inflammation of the lungs" less than a year later on 17 March 1857. Although only at St. Mary's a brief time, Della Vagna became known for his asceticism and strict adherence to the Capuchin rule. He was subsequently reinterred in the vault of the newly constructed St. Mary's.

St. Mary Catholic School was founded with the parish in 1852 and was originally operated by the Sisters of St. Joseph and the Christian Brothers. When the school outgrew the original structure on Adelaide Street, a new building was erected in 1918 facing McDonnell Square. This building was expanded in 1972. Currently, it is administrated by the Toronto Catholic District School Board, teaching Kindergarten through grade eight students.

Over time, large numbers of Poles and Ukrainians began to settle in the neighborhood around St. Mary's. By 1960, there was a large Portuguese population and McDonnell Square was renamed Portugal Square, with a part of Adelaide Street surrounding the block renamed Portugal Square to reflect the change. By 2012 demographics changed again with the parish "becoming more and more English as the cost of living downtown has increased."

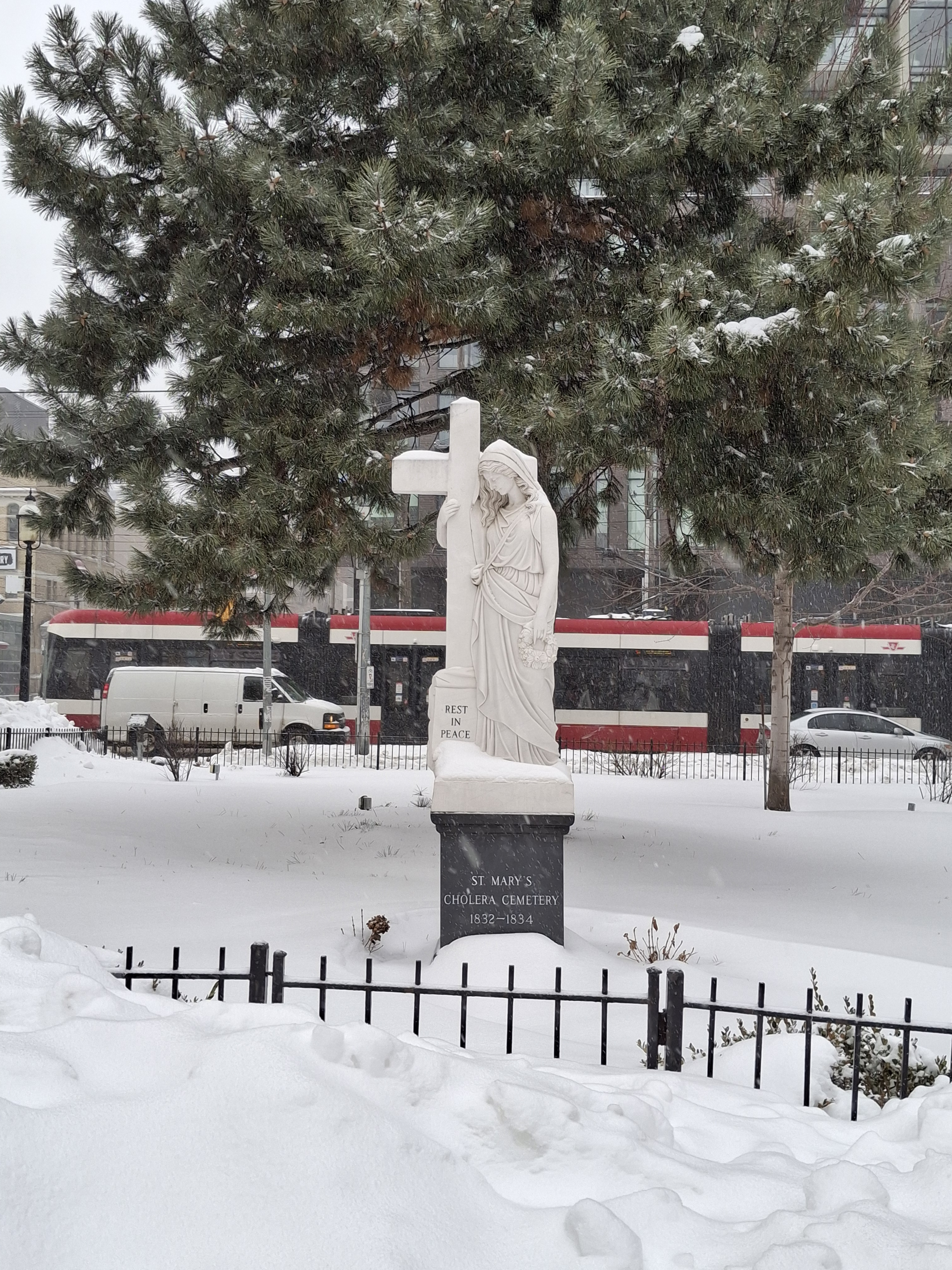

In late September, 2012, workers discovered the church had been built atop at least one mass grave. Press reports indicate the graves are of those who died in cholera outbreaks in 1832 and '34. The church said it would dedicate an appropriate monument to the dead.

Some music has been recorded in the church such as jazz, pop, and classical. Trumpeter Kenny Wheeler used St. Mary's to record his record Ensemble Fusionaire for CBC in 1976 with four other fellow Canadian musicians.

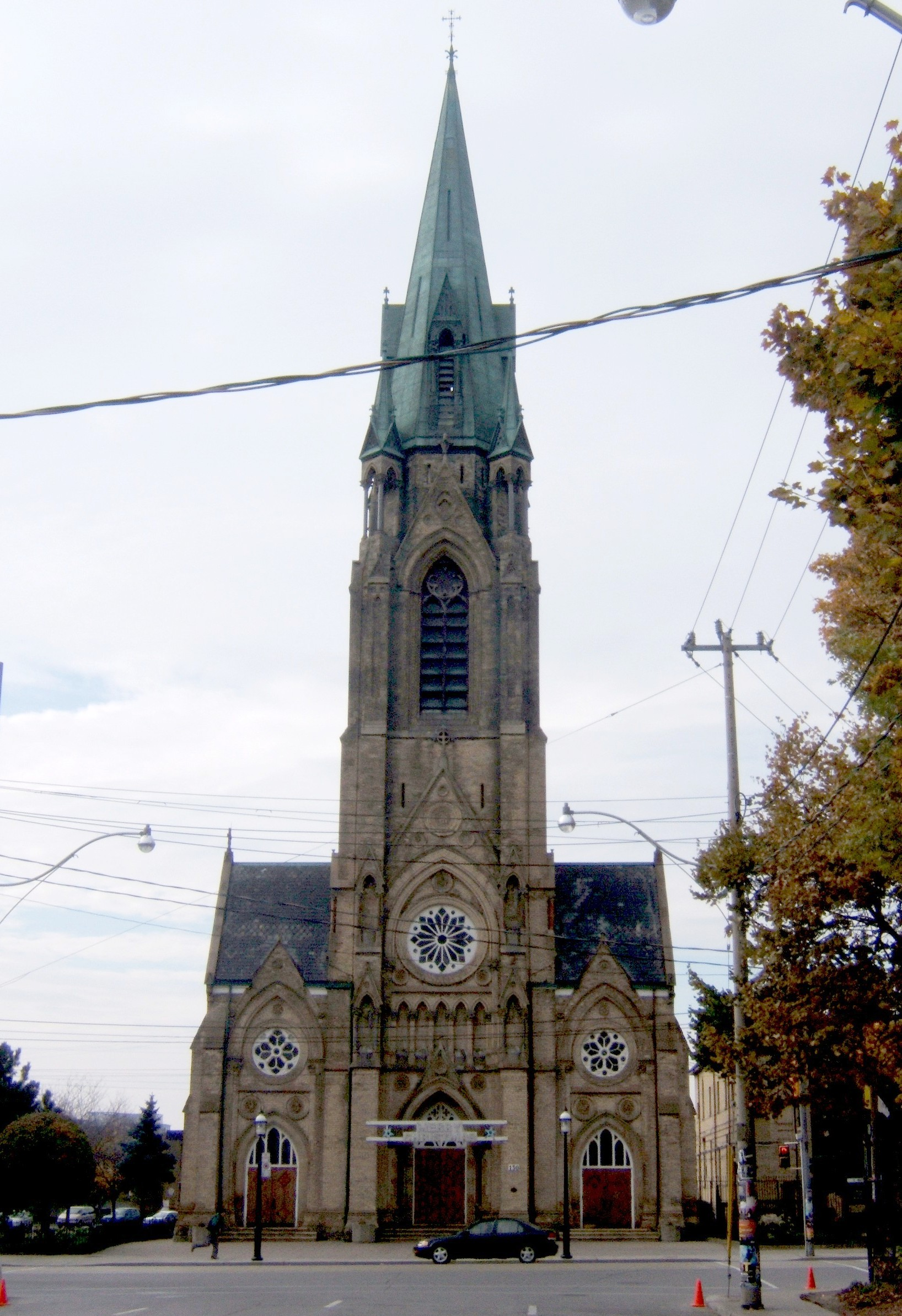
Looking west down Adelaide Street to the main facade.

== Architecture ==
Joseph Connolly designed a building that was contemporary yet evoked Irish Roman Catholic church building traditions, which was important to the Irish priest and his predominantly Irish congregation at the time.

Connolly composed a three-aisled basilica plan for the brick Gothic Revival design of St. Mary's Church, with a polygonal apsidal sanctuary, transepts slightly lower than the nave, and a morning chapel to the liturgical north or geographic south. The tower is positioned in the centre of the main facade facing Bathurst Street. Side portals and windows are enclosed within a large arch.

The main facade features a central section at the base of the tower with a rose window framed by a moulded pointed arch on columns and capitals, with recessed roundels located around the window. Smaller and lower versions of this design symmetrically frame the middle section on both sides. Beneath the central rose window is a blind arcade, and the main doorway below is topped with a gable with two roundels on either side. The brick- and copper-clad spire is characterized by corner niches, with gables rising above belfry openings between the angle turrets. The church's architecture aligns symmetrically with Adelaide Street with the tower facing the centre of the street, thus serving as a picturesque view terminus. Connolly's Church of Our Lady Immaculate in Guelph, Ontario stands similarly at the head of that city's Macdonell Street.

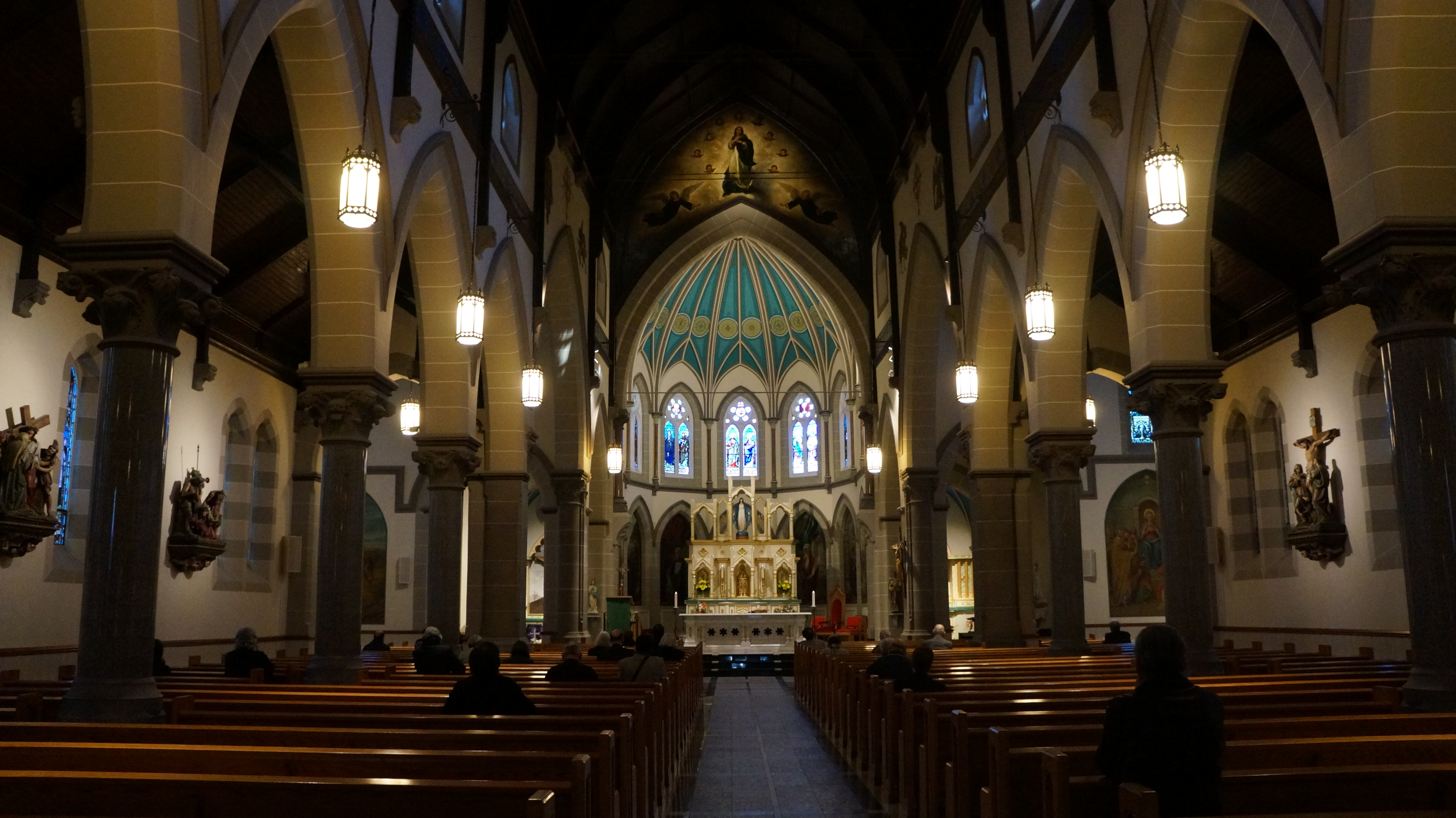
Interior

Arches to the transepts are carried on piers inside, and acanthus capitals crown the stone columns of the main arcades. The vaulted apse has a series of small stained-glass windows and paintings. The altar is wide, and the church has a small reredos with statues of Jesus and the Blessed Virgin Mary.

The spire was completed in 1905 by architect Arthur W. Holmes, a former assistant of Connelly.

== See also ==
- List of Roman Catholic churches in Toronto
