= Victoria Memorial Square =

Park and former cemetery in Toronto

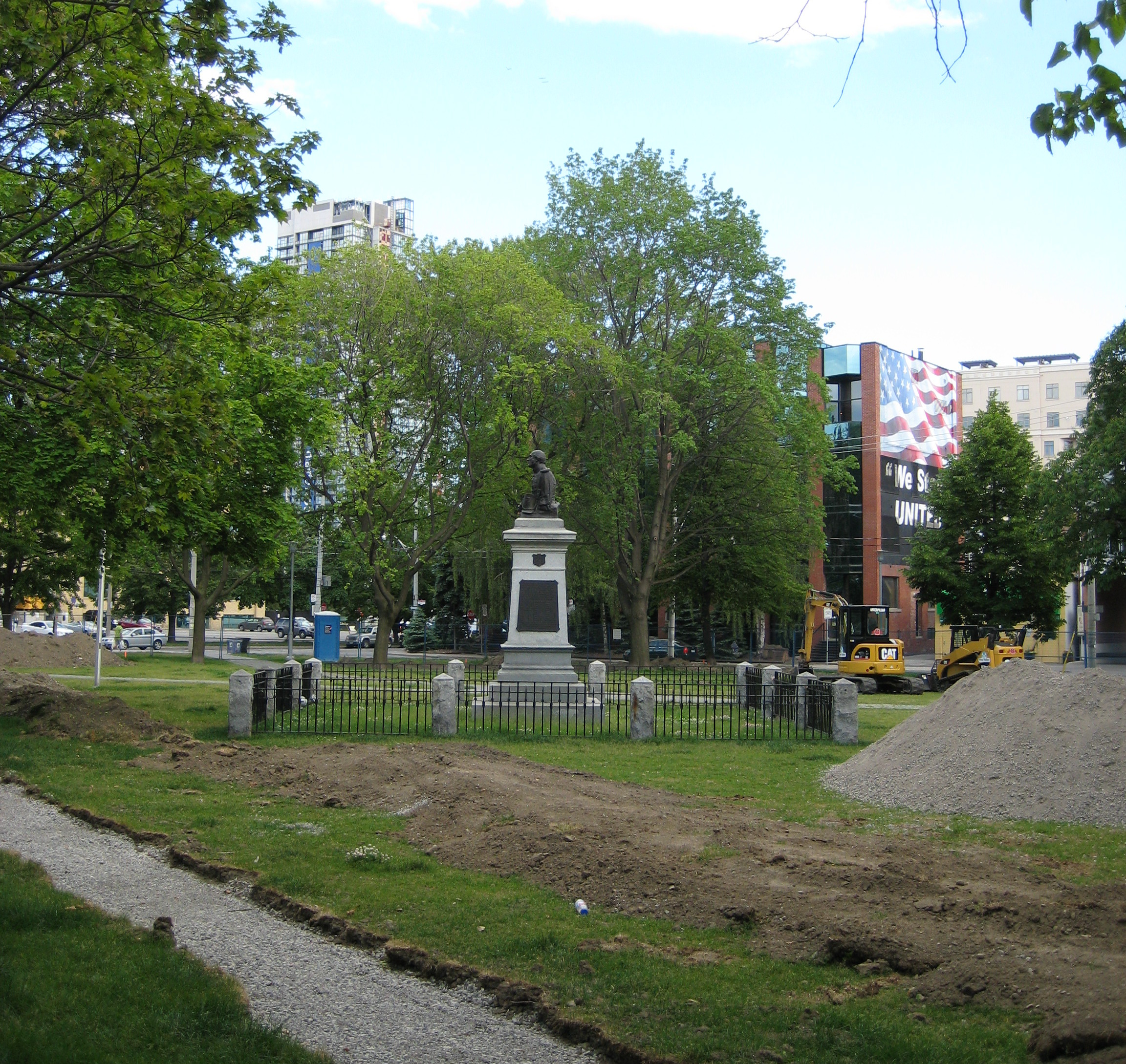
- Victoria Memorial Square under renovation in 2009 with the monument to the War of 1812.

- Location within Toronto
- Type: Public park
- Location: Toronto, Ontario
- Coordinates: 43°38′33″N 79°24′01″W
- Area: 0.83 hectares (2.05 acres)
- Operator: Toronto Parks

Victoria Memorial Square is a park and former cemetery in Toronto, Ontario, Canada. Established in 1793 as the burial place for those affiliated with the nearby Toronto Garrison (Fort York). It was the first cemetery to be used by European settlers in what would become the city of Toronto. Originally known as St. John's Square, the park today is part of Fort York National Historic Site, and the site of a monument to the War of 1812 sculpted by Walter Seymour Allward and completed in 1902.

== History ==
The cemetery was established by Governor John Graves Simcoe and the first burial in the cemetery was his infant daughter Katherine (1793–1794). It served as the military cemetery for Toronto until 1863 and saw some 400 burials, including a number of victims of the War of 1812.

When the Town of York was incorporated as the City of Toronto in 1834, its 'New Town' grid was extended from Peter Street to as far west as Garrison Creek creating the 'New Town Extension' with its curved Niagara Street, later extended a block closer to the Garrison Creek with Walnut Street. Victoria Square was one of four squares in the 'New Town Extension'; Clarence Square, McDonell Square and West Market Square were the others. McDonell Square became the site of St. Mary's Church and was renamed along with northern section of the roadway as Portugal Square in 1960. In the West Market Square, St. Andrew's Market was established to rival St. Lawrence Market in the 'Old Town' to the east. While the north half is now a city public works facility the southern portion is home to St. Andrew's Market and Playground a city parkette.

The cemetery reached capacity in 1863 and was closed and largely abandoned. Over the decades, neglect and vandalism resulted in there today being only 17 surviving gravestones. In the late 19th century, it was turned into a public park and has served as such since. It was restored between 2009 and 2011. Led by the Wellington Place Neighbourhood Association and Toronto Councillor Adam Vaughan, restoration included regrading, and elements such as lighting, pathways, street furniture, trees and other plantings, and a playground.

== Notable interments ==
- Christopher Robinson d. 1798
- Katherine Simcoe d. 1794
- Peter Russell d. 1808

== See also ==
- Canadian war memorials
- Royal eponyms in Canada
