= West Toronto Railpath =

Multi-use trail in Toronto, Canada

Coordinates: 43.66118°N 79.45377°W

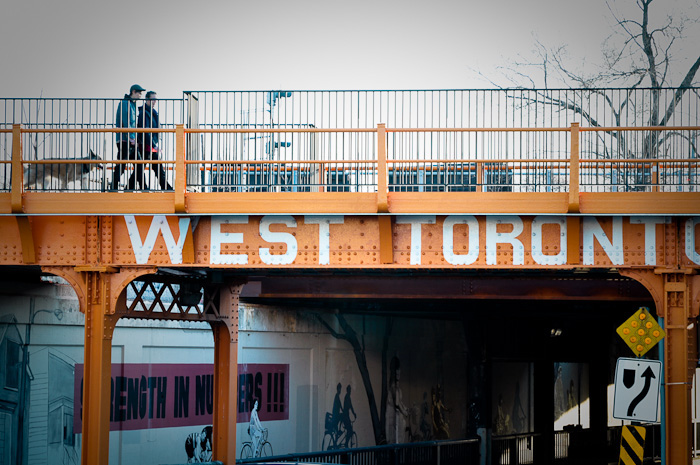
The railpath where it crosses over Dupont Street

The West Toronto Railpath is a multi-use trail in Toronto, Ontario, Canada, running from The Junction Triangle neighbourhood toward downtown Toronto. The Railpath was developed by the City of Toronto for bicycle and pedestrian use. Like Toronto's Beltline and Don Mills trails, it is an urban rail-to-trail project. Phase 1 of the path opened in 2009.

Planning for Phase 2, an extension south from Dundas Street West to Liberty Village, began as early as 2012 with an environmental assessment, with a goal of construction beginning in 2017. After a nearly five year environmental assessment, the City completed four years of public consultations, and construction was slated to begin in 2021, which was later pushed to 2022, 2023, 2025, and most recently 2026. In 2020, the City estimated the total cost of the extension at $20 million. By 2023, the cost estimate had grown to $83.75 million, and by 2024, $125.7 million or as high as $150 million, comparable to the cost of building a subway line in South Korea or Spain.

== History ==
Following a trade route that Indigenous people used from the Davenport Trail to Lake Iroquois, this route formed the path of a railway that started in 1871. In 1868, the Toronto, Grey and Bruce Railway was incorporated to provide rail service connecting Toronto to Southampton and Owen Sound (and points in between). Sections of this railway in Toronto ran along the rights of way of other existing railways. As this railway was a different (narrower) gauge, a separate set of tracks was required along the right of way. Due to service problems associated with the narrow gauge, the line was eventually converted to standard gauge in 1881. By 1883, the Canadian Pacific Railway had acquired the line. Into the 1960s, the portion of the track around Dupont was known as "The Old Bruce". It served several industries, including the Viceroy plant and the scrapyard.

The City of Toronto Economic Development and Parks Committee and grassroots community support began for this project before 1990, but the project necessitated the purchase of land and negotiations with rail operators and other stakeholders. Organizations involved include the Evergreen Foundation and, although the railpath is multi-use, notable advocacy by bicycling interests such as Toronto's Community Bicycle Network. The City of Toronto first authorized purchase of the land for the portion from Cariboo Avenue to Dundas Street West (known as the CP LEAD spur) in 1997. Funds to the amount of $920,000 were approved in 2000.

This land was acquired in July 2003 by the City of Toronto from the St. Lawrence and Hudson Railway. The purchase agreement demanded that the vendor remediate the soil to industrial standards. After acquiring the lands, the City of Toronto needed to terminate a lease that a salvage yard (M&S Waste and Salvage) had for a portion of the land, leased when the land was owned by Canadian Pacific.

Construction of Phase 1 of the path, running from Cariboo Avenue to Dundas Street West and Sterling Road, was designed by Scott Torrance Landscape Architect Inc. in conjunction with Brown and Storey Architects, and began in 2008 and was completed in 2009. The project combined the restoration of historical rail bridges with the installation of new public art pieces by artist John Dickson, all situated among indigenous planting. New entrance points at Dupont and Bloor streets allow pedestrians to access the trail from the street and use the restored rail bridges that cross over these streets. Concrete plazas are located along the trail where existing streets intersect it, providing neighbourhood connections and gathering places.

The realization of Phase 2 will be coordinated with the Metrolinx's Georgetown South Project, a planned expansion of rail capacity along the line for GO Transit and the existing Union Pearson Express.

== Location and phases ==
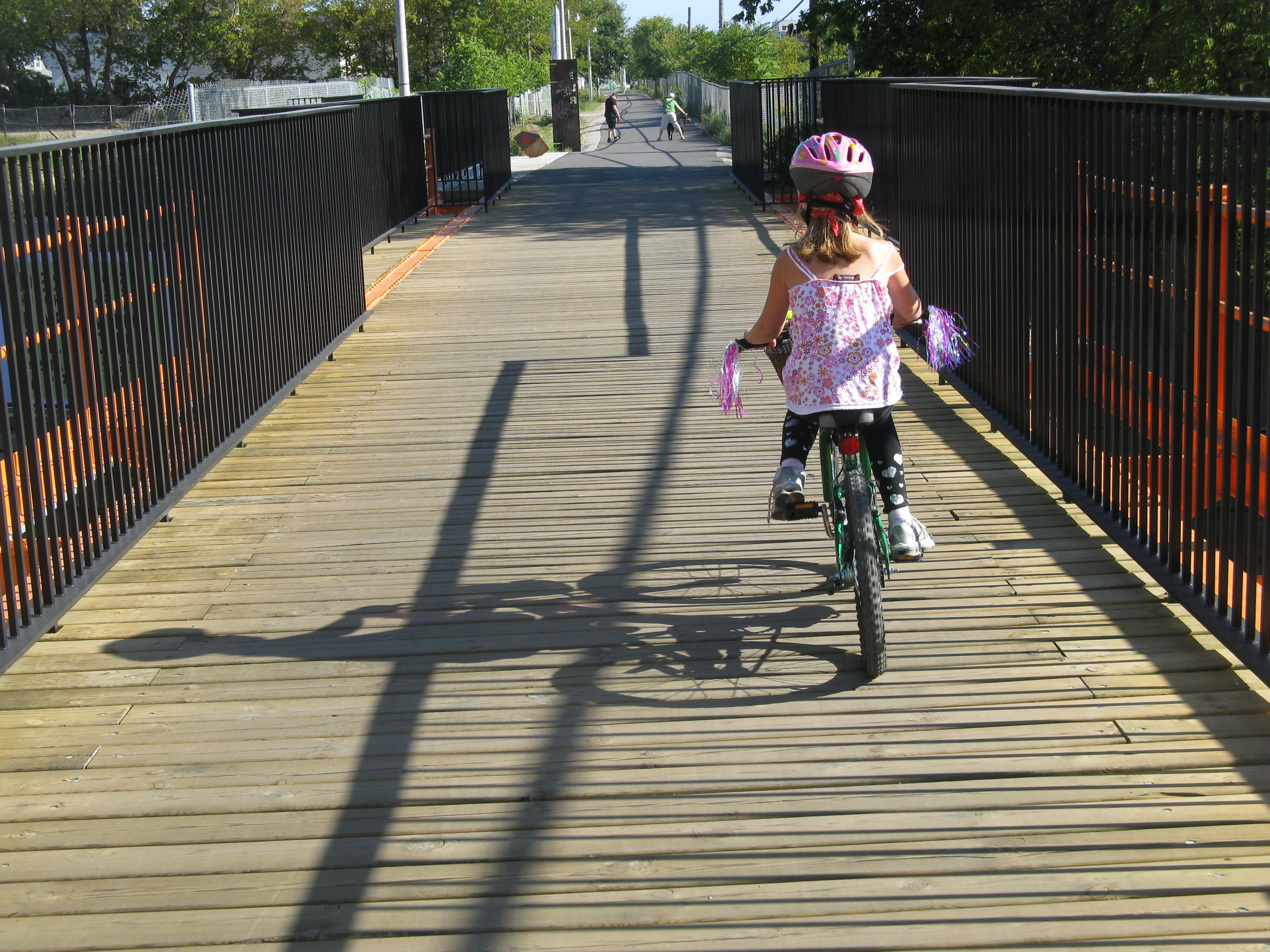
West Toronto Railpath, looking south as it passes over Bloor Street West.

In total, the railpath is proposed to run about 4 km from Cariboo Avenue in The Junction Triangle to Strachan Avenue near the downtown core (see map). Like other rail trail projects, the path runs along railway rights-of-way established many years ago that have been narrowed or abandoned.

Phase 1 is 2.1 km long, beginning at Cariboo Avenue and running southeast to Dundas Street West and Sterling Road. The contract for Phase 1 construction was awarded in April 2008 at a cost of (CDN) $3.8 million. Construction began in 2008 and was completed in summer 2009, with the formal opening on October 30, 2009.

Phase 2 will continue a further 2 km from Dundas Street West and Sterling Road southeast and east to Strachan Avenue and Wellington Street, providing access to the Wellington Street bicycle lane, near the Liberty Village development. Rail line capacity expansion projects by Metrolinx could potentially conflict with Phase 2. Toronto City Council continues to support the railpath. Metrolinx has indicated that it will work with the railpath's advocates to try to include the path as part of the Georgetown South expansion plans. The West Toronto Railpath Extension Study was completed and approved by Toronto City Council in January 2016 and included the functional design of the extension. In August 2016, the federal government announced funding, in partnership with the province, for detailed design and implementation with design work planned to commence in September 2016. Public consolation and feedback was completed in March 2020 and construction of the phase 2 extension was expected to begin in 2021 or 2022. Construction has been repeatedly delayed and is most recently planned to begin in 2026.

== Other Toronto railpaths ==
- Beltline Trail
- Don Mills Trail

== See also ==
- List of trails in Canada
