= Clarence Square =

Park in Toronto, Ontario, Canada

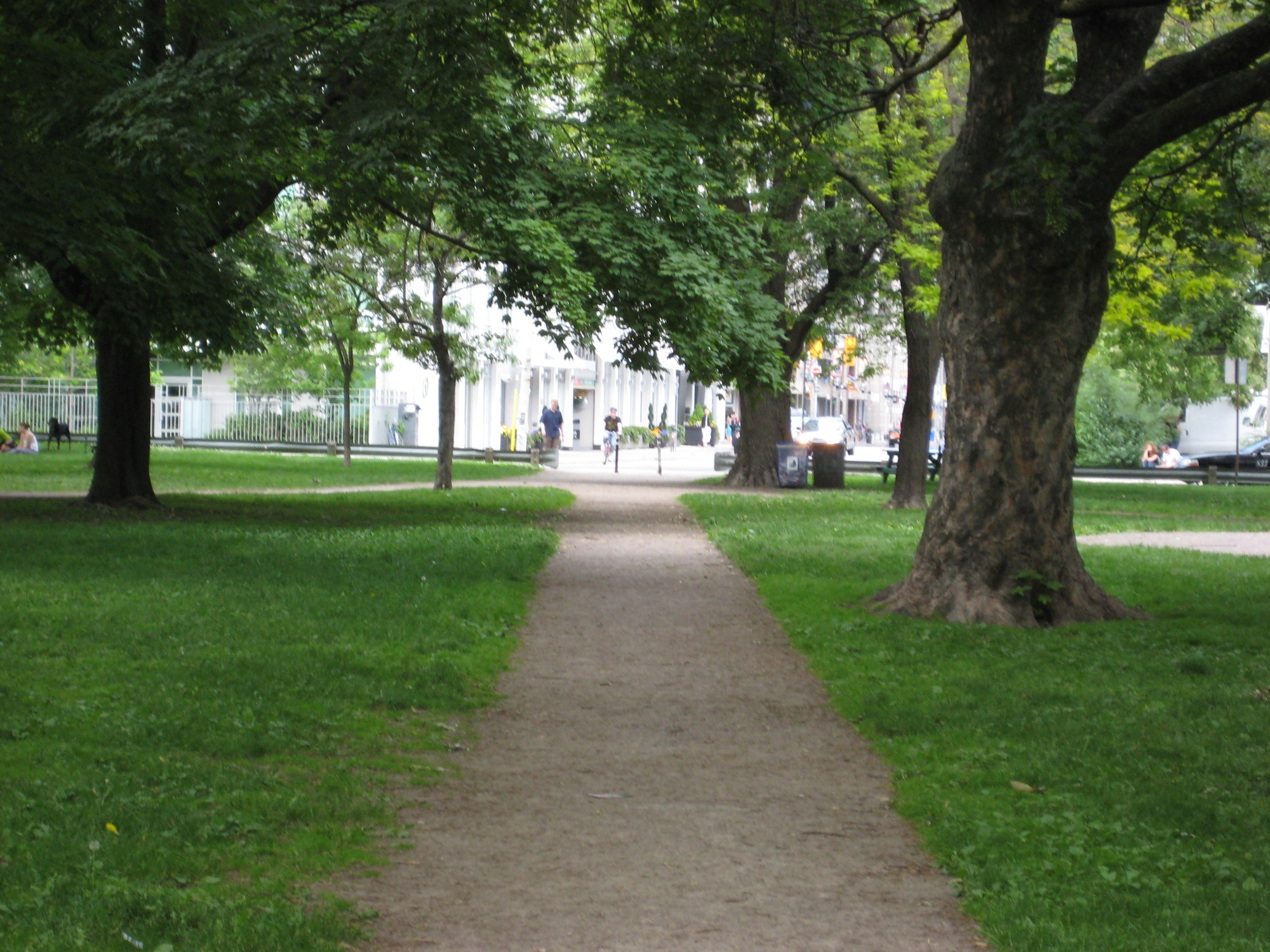
- The park in 2009

- Location within Toronto
- Type: Public Park
- Location: Toronto, Ontario, Canada
- Coordinates: 43°38′39″N 79°23′38″W
- Operator: Toronto Parks
- Website: Clarence Square

Clarence Square is a small park in downtown Toronto, Ontario, Canada, where Wellington Street West meets Spadina Avenue. It is a relatively quiet and shady park, with many large trees and a spacious grassy terrain. There are several benches and picnic tables scattered throughout and a drinking fountain in the centre.

The origins of the name of the square are unclear, but both are linked to members of the British Royal Family, Prince William Henry, Duke of Gloucester and Edinburgh or Prince Albert Victor, Duke of Clarence and Avondale, with the former being the likely name as the name appeared on maps in the 1850s.

In the northwest corner of the park is a historical plaque honouring Alexander Dunn, born near the park, who was the first Canadian recipient of the Victoria Cross. In 1854, he was a participant in the Charge of the Light Brigade at Balaclava, saving the lives of two fellow soldiers. Hugh John Macdonald, son of Prime Minister Sir John A. Macdonald, also lived in the area (#304).

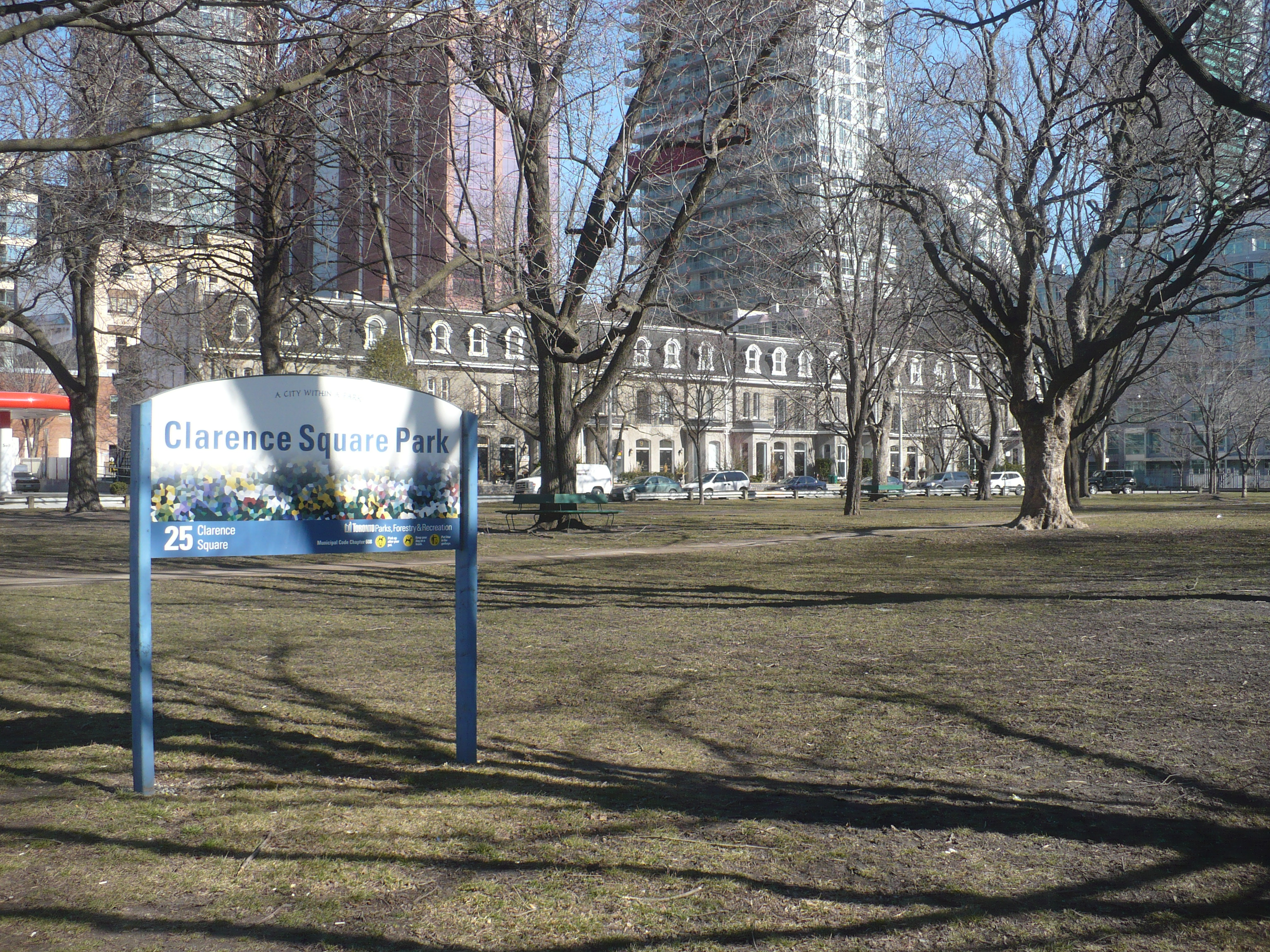
Park sign, 2012

Clarence Square is one of the oldest remaining park spaces in the downtown core of Toronto. The park became a largely neglected space, however, when the rail yards and industrial warehouses inhabited areas adjacent to the park. Today, however, industry has left the neighbourhood and the area is primarily residential and commercial.

Historic buildings along Clarence Square include:

- Clarence Terrace (5-15 and 6-16 Clarence Square) built in 1879–1890
- Steele Briggs Seed Company warehouse or Clarence Square Building (originally as 2 Clarence Square now as 49 Spadina Avenue) 5-storey warehouse and office built in 1911–13

== See also ==
Other squares envisioned by the 'New Town Extension':

- Portugal (McDonell) Square
- West Market Square
- Victoria Memorial Square
