= Ontario Stockyards =

Ontario Stockyards is a livestock auction facility located in Cookstown, Ontario and serves much of Southern Ontario in selling cattle, pork and other livestock from producers to buyers to process as meat.

== History ==
=== St. Lawrence Market 1803-1877 ===
The buying and selling of livestock in early Toronto was done at St. Lawrence Market beginning in 1803. Most livestock came from farmers near Toronto.

=== Western Cattle Market ===
With the arrival of trains, livestock from further sources could be sold in Toronto. In 1877 the cattle trade moved from the cramped quarters of the city market to a location next to the Grand Trunk Railway at what is now Wellington Street West and Tecumseth Street. Trade of sheep, pigs would eventually be moved over and by 1887 odor and pollution at the Western site became an issue.

There was also competition from various abattoirs located in the city including:

- Harris Abattoir (near Western Market) - founded by butcher William Harris (1848-1914) as part of W Harris Company
- William Davies Company (near mouth of Don River) by William Davies (1831-1921)
- Matthews-Blackwell (located near Western Market).

The market would be destroyed by a fire in 1908 and rebuilt shortly after.

=== Union Stock Yards Company Limited / Toronto Municipal Abattoirs ===
- Union Stock Yards Company Limited was established in 1900 and began operating in The Junction area of West Toronto in 1903.
- Toronto Municipal Abattoir was opened in 1914 next to the Western Cattle Market site at the foot of Tecumseth Street or Western Cattle Market

=== Ontario Stockyards ===
Various abattoirs would relocate to the Junction area including Harris Abattoir Company (1913), Gunns Limited (1907) and Swift Canadian (1911).

Ownership of Union Stockyards from Harris (merged with Davies and Gunn in 1927 to form Canada Packers) and Swift were sold to US-based United Stockyards in the 1930s and prompted the Government of Ontario to takeover in 1944. Renamed Ontario Stockyards. the site would become the largest in North America and the only government owned facility in Canada. The Canada Packers would replace Davies and also move to the Stockyards site.

In 1960, the City of Toronto sold their abattoir to Quality Meat Packers.

=== Relocation to Cookstown ===
The growth of the area of West Toronto and Niagara area prompted the closure of livestock activities in the city limits.

The original stockyard site was closed in 1993 and relocated to 3807 Highway 89 in Cookstown. Two cattle processors would remain on the site and have since closed due to operational issues by federal regulators.

Quality Meats closed in 2014 and ended pork processing within the city. Pork processing is now found beyond the city, namely in Burlington (Fearmans), Woolwich (Conestoga) and Mitchell (Great Lakes Specialty - now turkey plant).
