= William Peyton Hubbard =

Canadian politician (1842–1935)

- Portrait of William Peyton Hubbard

Alderman for Ward 4
- In office 1894 — 1898, 1900 – 1903

Vice-chairman of the Toronto Board of Control
- In office January 1, 1906 – December 31, 1906

Toronto Board of Control
- In office 1898, 1901, 1904 – 1908

Alderman for Ward 1
- In office January 1, 1913 – December 31, 1913

Personal details
- Born: January 27, 1842 Toronto, Canada West
- Died: April 30, 1935 (aged 93) Toronto, Ontario, Canada
- Spouse: Julia Luckett
- Education: Toronto Normal School
- Occupation: doctor, baker, chauffeur

William Peyton Hubbard (January 27, 1842 – April 30, 1935), a Toronto alderman from 1894 to 1914, was a popular and influential politician, nicknamed Cicero for his oratory; he was one of the first politicians of West African descent elected to office in Canada.

== Early life ==
Hubbard was born in a cabin in what were then the outskirts of Toronto, in a rural area called "the Bush" near the intersection of what are now Bloor Street and Bathurst Street. His parents were refugee American slaves who had escaped their plantation in Virginia and reached Canada in 1840 via the Underground Railroad. Raised a devout Anglican, Hubbard was the eldest of eight children and trained as a baker at the Toronto Normal School. He invented and patented a successful commercial baker's oven, the Hubbard Portable Street Oven, which was marketed and sold by his younger brothers James Henry Hubbard and Charles Hubbard across North America. James later left for Britain where he became an organiser of large events, and supplied taxidermy specimens of Canadian wildlife for the 1886 Colonial and Indian Exhibition in South Kensington, London. Frederick Horniman bought many of the mounts, including the overstuffed walrus now the unofficial mascot of Horniman Museum in London. James eventually set up a business in Devil's Dyke in Brighton.

By his thirties, William Peyton Hubbard had married Julia Luckett. After having worked 16 years as a baker, he joined his uncle's horse-drawn livery taxi service. According to what may be an apocryphal story, one winter night, he rescued another cab and its occupant, newspaper publisher George Brown, from drowning in the Don River. A grateful Brown hired Hubbard as his driver. Hubbard himself, however, said that he was not present at the accident but that the incident upset Brown so much that Hubbard agreed to become Brown's driver as a favour to his brother, who operated the livery service that Brown used. Regardless of which version is correct, Brown and Hubbard became friends and the publisher later encouraged Hubbard to seek public office. His lifelong friend was Anderson Ruffin Abbott, Canada's first black physician.

== City politics ==
Hubbard first sought public office in 1893 at the age of 51, running in Toronto's Ward 4, where he lost by 7 votes. Encouraged, he ran again in Ward 4 in 1894 and was elected to represent the quiet, tree-lined ward of grand homes; it was one of the wealthiest and whitest wards in the city (encompassing an area between University Avenue and Bathurst Street). He was elected to city council and the Toronto Board of Control a total of 5 times in his career.

A reformer armed with a sharp wit and a powerful oratory skills, which earned him the nickname "Old Cicero", Hubbard was known for his strong sense of public duty. He made his name fighting for public ownership of Toronto's water and hydroelectric supplies.

Hubbard was appointed to the Toronto Board of Control, the city's powerful executive body, in 1898 and agitated to have the body directly elected by the people. After this reform was done, he won election to the body in its first citywide election in 1904. He thus became the first person of colour to win a citywide election in Toronto's history. Hubbard topped the polls in the election to the Board in 1906; as vice-chairman of the board, he served as acting mayor on occasions when the mayor was absent. He was re-elected in 1907.

Despite being a city official, Hubbard needed to obtain a letter from Mayor Emerson Coatsworth vouching for his character when travelling to Washington, D.C. for a business meeting in 1906.

Hubbard gained passage of almost 100 initiatives in his years on council. He advocated improved waterworks and opposed its privatization, sought roads, and the authority to enact local improvement bylaws. He also fought for the creation of High Park.

He also opposed various forms of discrimination. In 1896, he defended the small Chinese community against unfair taxes meant to discourage Chinese-operated hand laundries. He also presented a petition to City Council calling for an end to "attacks on the Jewish religion" by anti-Semitic street preachers.

Hubbard joined with Sir Adam Beck to advocate a publicly owned hydroelectricity utility system in the province and led efforts to create the publicly owned Toronto Hydro-Electric System. He was opposed in this campaign by some businessmen who wanted a private system, leading to his defeat in 1908, his first loss at the polls in 24 years. He was defeated again in the 1909 and 1910 municipal elections.

He was appointed justice of the peace for York County in May 1908. Hubbard returned to city council in the 1913 election, this time representing Ward 1 which included the Riverdale neighbourhood. He retired at the end of his one-year term due to his wife's ill health.

Hubbard served on the board of the Toronto House of Industry, an institution which provided relief for the poor, for four decades.

== Retirement and death ==
Hubbard retired to the Riverdale area of the city, building a home on Broadview Avenue near Danforth Avenue. He lived there until his death from a stroke at the age of 93. Coincidentally the alderman, dubbed the Grand Old Man by Toronto press in his political days, and serving well into his 90s, was quite literally the oldest man in the city for a short period before his death. Flags at Toronto City Hall, St. Lawrence Market, and other public buildings in the city flew at half-mast to mark his death. He is buried in the Toronto Necropolis.

His son Frederick Langdon Hubbard was chairman of the Toronto Transportation Commission from 1929 to 1930 and married Grace (Abbot) Hubbard, the daughter of Anderson Ruffin Abbott.

== Honours ==
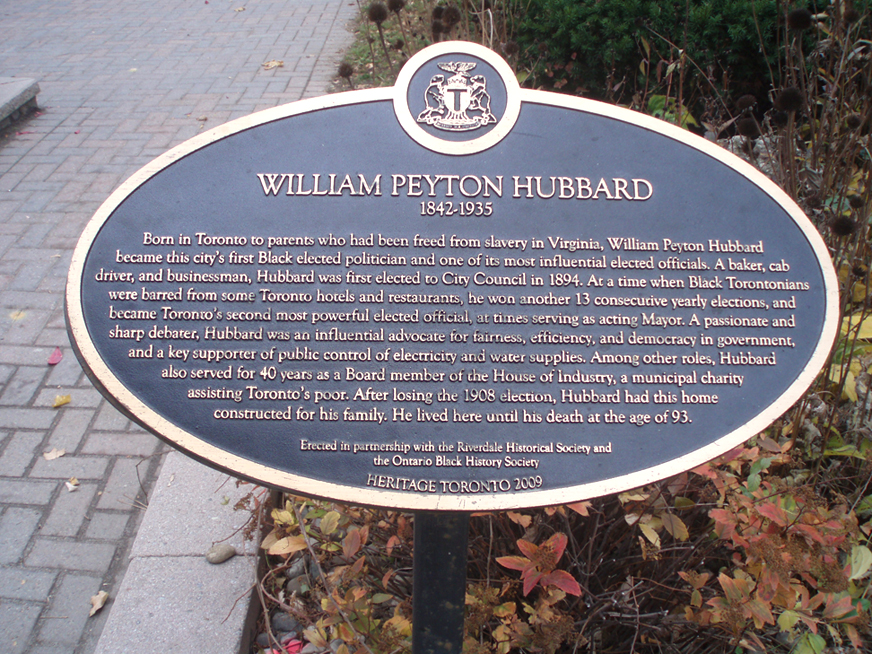
Hubbard House historical plaque

- Hubbard's portrait hangs in the office of the Mayor of Toronto.
- The City of Toronto's William Peyton Hubbard Award For Race Relations was established in 1989 and is awarded annually. Recipients have included Leonard Braithwaite, QC, George Elliot Clarke, Dub Poet Lillian Allen, and former Ontario cabinet minister Alvin Curling.
- The William Peyton Hubbard Memorial Award is a scholarship established in 2000 and funded by Hydro One which is awarded annually to multiple black students studying power industry-related disciplines at a recognized Ontario post-secondary institution. The award includes an offer of a work term or summer employment at Hydro One.
- A historical plaque commemorating Hubbard is located in front of his former home at 660 Broadview Avenue; it is now named Hubbard House and houses several classrooms for the Montcrest School.
- Hubbard Park, located at 562 Gerrard Street, at Broadview Avenue was opened in 2016 in a ceremony in front of an audience that included 16 of Hubbard's descendants. The park, located not far from Hubbard's long-time home on Broadview Avenue, was created after the closure of the Don Jail when the land in front of the restored building was landscaped as part of the expansion of Bridgepoint Health.

== Cultural depictions ==
Hubbard was portrayed as a member of the Board of Control in episode 13 of season 9 ("Colour Blinded") (February 8, 2016) of the Canadian television period drama Murdoch Mysteries by the actor Rothaford Gray. In the episode, he comes to the defence of an innocent black man, who has been racially profiled by the Toronto police. He appeared again in episode 16 of season 9 ("Bl**dy H*ll") (March 7, 2016), now as an Alderman.

Hubbard was portrayed in episode 8 of season 3 ("Ward of the Roses") (November 11, 2019) of the Canadian television period drama Frankie Drake Mysteries by the actor Neville Edwards.

== Biography ==
A biography, Against All Odds, was published in 1986 and written by his great-grandson Stephen L. Hubbard.

== Electoral history ==
=== Toronto Board of Control (top 4 candidates elected) ===
The Toronto Board of Control was directly elected beginning in 1904. Previously, the body had been appointed by Toronto City Council from amongst its members. Hubbard had been appointed in 1898 and 1901.

1904
Frank S. Spence - 12,294
John F. Loudon - 11,121
William Peyton Hubbard - 8,950
Fred H. Richardson - 8,923
William Burns - 8,641
James Russell Lovett Starr - 8,639
Joseph Oliver - 8,598
John Shaw - 7,184

1905
Frank S. Spence (incumbent) - 13,032
J.J. Ward - 12,993
William Peyton Hubbard (incumbent) - 12,880
John Shaw - 12,436
J.R.L Starr - 9,823
Joseph Oliver - 8,141
Thomas Foster - 6,395
G.R. Ramsden - 5,839
Frank Moses - 5,048
A.R. Denison - 4,925
Edward Hanlan - 2,178

1906
William Peyton Hubbard (incumbent) - 14,081
S. Alfred Jones - 14,039
J.J. Ward (incumbent) - 13,770
John Shaw (incumbent) - 12,524
Hastings - 11,308

1907
J.J. Ward (incumbent) - 9,362
William Spence Harrison - 9,054
Horatio Clarence Hocken - 8,639
William Peyton Hubbard (incumbent) - 8,483
Robert Fleming - 7,077
S. Alfred Jones (incumbent) - 6,710
John Shaw (incumbent) - 6,465
John Dunn - 5,038
Davies - 1,390
Joel Marvin Briggs - 496

1908
Horatio Clarence Hocken (incumbent) - 16,844
Frank S. Spence - 11,512
William Spence Harrison (incumbent) - 10,312
J.J. Ward (incumbent) - 10,075
William Peyton Hubbard (incumbent) - 9,203
John Shaw - 6,385
Robert Fleming - 5,640
Oliver Sheppard - 5,099
John Dunn - 4,434
John Enoch Thompson - 1,291
James Lindala - 1,220
Hugh MacMath - 1,013
Robert Buist Noble - 745
James O'Hara - 367
Joel Marvin Briggs - 232

1909
George Reginald Geary - 19,027
Horatio Clarence Hocken (incumbent) - 17,380
J.J. Ward (incumbent) - 15,782
William Spence Harrison (incumbent) - 13,509
Frank S. Spence (incumbent) - 12,933
William Peyton Hubbard - 11,275
Hales - 8,171
Robert Buist Noble - 1,287
James O'Hara - 779

1910
Frank S. Spence - 13,879
J.J. Ward (incumbent) - 13,401
Tommy Church - 12,657
Thomas Foster - 10,841
William Spence Harrison (incumbent) - 9,946
William Peyton Hubbard - 9,498
Mark Bredin - 8,708
James Henry McGhie - 7,511
James Hales - 5,852
Albert Chamberlain - 2,730

=== Alderman ===
1893
Fourth Ward
William Carlyle (incumbent) - 2,292
William Burns (incumbent) - 2,266
James Jolliffe (incumbent) - 1,966
George Verral (incumbent) - 1,634
Wm. P. Hubbard - 1,626
A.F. Jury - 1,316

(top 4 candidates elected)

1894
Fourth Ward
William Burns (incumbent) - 2,011
Wm. P. Hubbard - 1,993
James Jolliffe (incumbent) - 1,600
James Crane - 1,458
George Verral (incumbent) - 1,381
W.G. Harris - 1,123
John McCaffrey - 1,014
M. B. Alison - 986
Alex R. Williamson - 960
John Ward - 511
John Dill - 340

1895
Fourth Ward
William Burns (incumbent) - 2,217
Wm. P. Hubbard (incumbent) - 2,213
James Crane (incumbent) - 1,839
James Jolliffe (incumbent) -1,189
B. Alison - 1,084
George Verral - 979
A.F. Jury - 903
Thompson Porter - 795
Alex R. Williamson - 697
George Williams - 512
Henry Cohen - 353

1896
Fourth Ward
William Burns (incumbent) - 2,356
Wm. P. Hubbard (incumbent) - 2,058
James Crane (incumbent) - 1,835
James Jolliffe (incumbent) -1,448
John McCaffrey - 1,093
John Lester - 583
Robert P. Hall - 485
Frank Sexton -283

1897
Fourth Ward
Wm. P. Hubbard (incumbent) - 2,798
Wm. Burns (incumbent) - 2,621
James Crane (incumbent) - 1,777
William Carlyle - 1,543
James Jolliffe (incumbent) -1,354
H.E. Trent - 1,291
F.W. Unitt - 1,221
J.E. Verral - 941
Robert P. Hall - 536
James Langdon - 340
D.H. Watt - 89

1898
Fourth Ward
Wm. Burns (incumbent) - 2,226
Wm. P. Hubbard (incumbent) - 2,161
James Crane (incumbent) - 1,888
Edward Hanlan - 1,595
H.E. Trent - 1,300
Thomas Urquhart - 1,264
William Carlyle (incumbent) - 1,093
James Jolliffe - 838
W.G McWilliams -835
Robert P. Hall - 323
George McKibbon - 279

At the first city council meeting following the election, Hubbard was one of three aldermen chosen to sit on the Toronto Board of Control

1899
Fourth Ward
Wm. Burns (incumbent) - 2,870
James Crane (incumbent) - 2,818
Edward Hanlan (incumbent) - 2,373
Wm. P. Hubbard (incumbent) - 2,318
Thomas Urquhart - 2,288
S.W. Burns - 2,057
H.W. Paull - 1,016
Thomas Roberts - 238

1900
Fourth Ward
Thomas Urquhart - 3,098
Wm. P. Hubbard (incumbent) - 2,674
James Crane (incumbent) - 2,601
Wm. Burns (incumbent) - 2,495
Stephen W. Burns - 2,476
Edward Hanlan (incumbent) - 1,345
Thomas Roberts - 384

1901
Fourth Ward (Spadina)
Thomas Urquhart - 3,191
William Burns (incumbent) - 2,680
William Peyton Hubbard (incumbent) - 2,673
James Crane (incumbent) - 2,500
Alex R. Williamson - 1,688
Samuel Platt - 740

At the first city council meeting following the election, Hubbard was one of four aldermen chosen to sit on the Toronto Board of Control

1902
Fourth Ward (Spadina)
Thomas Urquhart - 3,280
William Burns (incumbent) -2,803
James Crane (incumbent) - 2,709
William Peyton Hubbard (incumbent) - 2,496
Alex R. Williamson - 1,830
Edmund Schilling - 254

1903
Fourth Ward (Spadina)
William Burns (incumbent) -2,770
William Peyton Hubbard (incumbent) - 2,585
Dr. William S. Harrison - 2,582
Stephen Wellesley Burns - 2,469
Alex R. Williamson - 1,731
Lieut-Col. Norman F. Paterson - 1,535
Edmund Schilling - 258

1913
Ward 1 (Riverdale)
William D. Robbins - 4,030
Albert Edwin Walton - 3,789
William Peyton Hubbard - 3,611
William John Saunderson (incumbent) - 1,935
William Edward Orr - 1,209
Frank Britton - 602

(top 3 candidates elected)
