= 1905 Toronto municipal election =

Municipal elections were held in Toronto, Ontario, Canada, on January 2, 1905. Thomas Urquhart was elected to his third term as mayor, defeating merchant George Gooderham and barrister William David McPherson.

Also four seats on the Board of Control were filled through cumulative voting with each voter able to cast four votes. About 91,000 votes were cast by approximately 27,000 voters.

Eighteen aldermen were elected in three-seat wards.

== Toronto mayor ==
Results
Thomas Urquhart - 15,173
George Gooderham - 12,827
William David McPherson - 1,136

== Board of Control ==
Incumbents Frank S. Spence, William Peyton Hubbard, and John Shaw were re-elected to the Toronto Board of Control and were joined by Alderman J. J. Ward, who filled the vacancy created by Controller Louden's retirement. Controller Shaw first joined the board several months later by winning a by-election following the resignation of Controller Fred H. Richardson, who had resigned following allegations that he had received bribes from the Toronto Railway Company.

Results
Frank S. Spence (incumbent) - 13,032
Alderman John Joseph Ward - 12,993
William Peyton Hubbard (incumbent) - 12,880
John Shaw (incumbent) - 12,436
James Russell Lovett Starr - 9,823
Joseph Oliver - 8,141
Alderman Thomas Foster - 6,395
Alderman Joseph George Ramsden - 5,839
Frank Moses - 5,048
Arthur Richard Denison - 4,925
Edward Hanlan - 2,178

Source: and

== Plebiscites ==
Two by-laws authorizing public works expenditures were approved by plebiscite: a by-law to spend $300,000 on new buildings on the Toronto Industrial Exhibition grounds, $700,000 to improve the city's fire protection system in the wake of the 1904 Great Fire of Toronto. A third vote on a $700 tax exemption for all dwellings was also approved.

Exhibition
Yes - 6,151
No - 4,307

Fire protection
Yes - 8,325
No - 3,239

Tax exemption
Yes - 15,454
No - 8,127

== City council ==
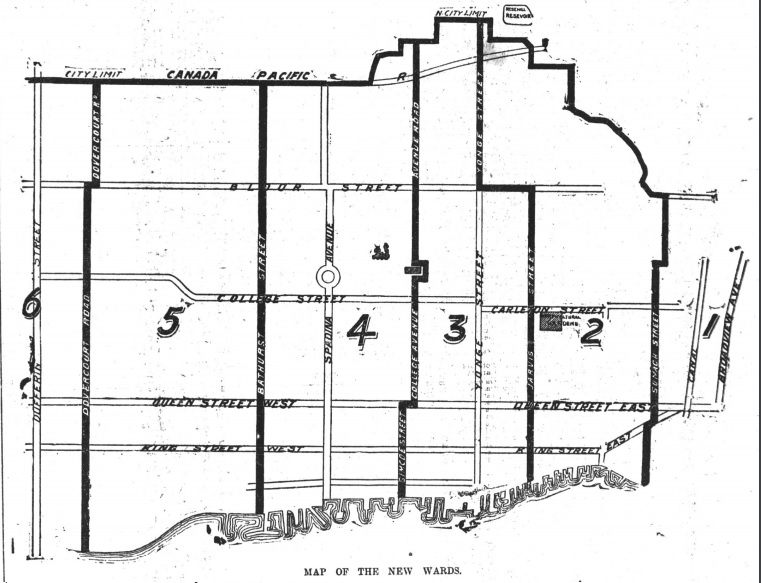
Map of Toronto's six wards (1892-1909), published in The Globe, 1 January 1892.

Eighteen aldermen were elected to Toronto City Council, three in each of the six wards.

First Ward (Riverdale)
Daniel Chisholm (incumbent) - 2,000
Robert Fleming (incumbent) - 1,924
William Temple Stewart (incumbent) - 1,692
James Wilson - 1,304

Second Ward (Cabbagetown and Rosedale)
Emerson Coatsworth(incumbent) - 2,601
Dr. John Noble (incumbent) - 2,128
Tommy Church - 1,891
David Carlyle - 1,722
Wesley S. Johnston - 1,289
Edward Strachan Cox - 910

Third Ward (Central Business District and The Ward)
Oliver Barton Sheppard (incumbent) - 2,535
George Reginald Geary (incumbent) - 2,466
Sam McBride - 2,215
Henry Sheard - 2,204
Julius Alexander Humphrey - 837
Thomas Edward Rawson - 788
William Carlyle Hall - 505
John Dunlop - 259

Fourth Ward (Spadina)
Dr. William S. Harrison (incumbent) - 3,127
Robert Crawford Vaughan - 2,931
Stephen Alfred Jones (incumbent) - 2,427
Stephen W. Burns - 1,987
Richard Donald - 1,898
Arthur Hillyard Birmingham - 733

Fifth Ward (Trinity-Bellwoods)
John Bell Hay (incumbent) - 2,389
John Dunn (incumbent) - 2,314
Albert James Keeler - 2,155
Frank Woods (incumbent) - 1,938
Peter Whytock - 1,567
M. Joseph Mallancy - 427

Sixth Ward (Brockton and Parkdale)
James Henry McGhie (incumbent) - 2,024
John James Graham (incumbent) - 1,888
Dr. Adam Lynd - 1,635
John Milton Godfrey - 1,608
William James Clark - 702
Sam Scott - 655
James Edward Stewart - 416
George Gordon Miles - 362
Robert Buist Noble - 148

Source: and
