= 1904 Toronto municipal election =

Municipal elections were held in Toronto, Ontario, Canada, on January 1, 1904. Thomas Urquhart was acclaimed to a second term. 1904 was the first time the Toronto Board of Control, the executive committee of Toronto, was directly elected, after the Ontario legislature passed a law requiring municipal boards of control to be chosen through direct election by the municipality's voters. Previously, Toronto City Council chose four alderman to sit on the body, which would be chaired by the mayor. The Board of Control was elected using cumulative voting, starting with this election.

As well, the number of councillors was decreased from 24 to 18, with three elected in each ward through plurality block voting, as opposed to four in each ward as previously.

Approximately 24,000 voters voted in this election.

== Toronto mayor ==
Results
Thomas Urquhart - acclaimed

== Board of Control ==
Four members of the Toronto Board of Control were directly elected for the first time. Previously, Controllers were four alderman chosen by city council. Aldermen Loudon, Oliver, Burns and Richardson had been appointed to the outgoing Board of Control.

Under a new provincial law, the Board of Control was elected directly by voters. Each voter had up to four votes and could place them all on different candidates or all on one candidate (cumulative voting).

Seven of the eight candidates were sitting aldermen: First Ward Alderman Richardson, Second Ward Aldermen Spence and Oliver, Third Ward Alderman Loudon, Fourth Ward Aldermen Burns and Hubbard, Fifth Ward Alderman Starr. The other candidate, John Shaw, was a former mayor.

Several months after the election, Controller Richardson resigned after his election agent was charged with accepting bribes from the Toronto Railway Company, a private streetcar company. Shaw was then elected to the Board of Control in a by-election.

William Peyton Hubbard, a sitting alderman but not a member of the Board of Control, was elected to the Board of Control in 1904. As of 2020, he was the only person of colour to ever be elected to city-wide office in Toronto. Hubbard, whose parents were former slaves who had fled to Toronto through the Underground Railroad, was the first person of colour to be elected to Toronto City Council when he was elected in 1894 and was one of the first Black people to be elected to any public office in Canada.

Results
Frank S. Spence - 12,294
John F. Loudon - 11,121
William Peyton Hubbard - 8,950
Fred H. Richardson - 8,923
not elected
William Burns - 8,641
James Russell Lovett Starr - 8,639
Joseph Oliver - 8,598
John Shaw - 7,184

== Plebiscites ==
A plebiscite was held on a by-law granting $50,000 towards the creation of a sanatorium for the prevention and treatment of tuberculosis.

Sanatorium by-law
For - 4,131
Against - 3,681

== City council ==
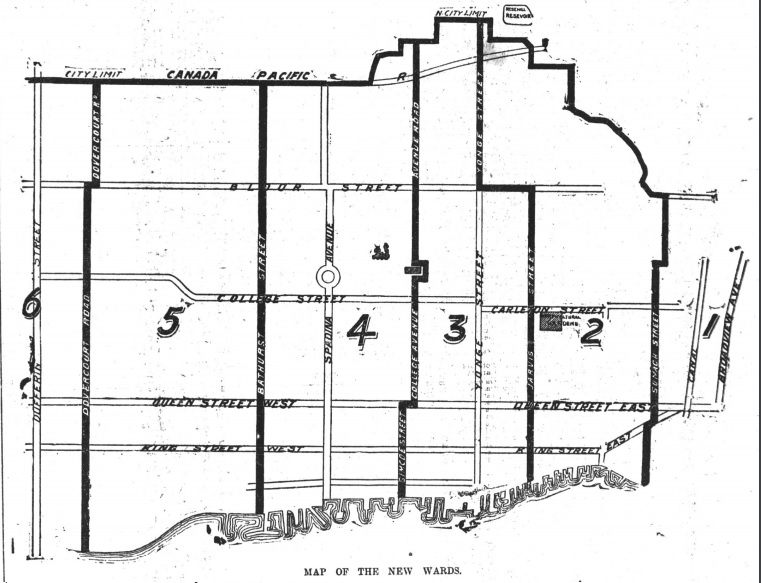
Map of Toronto's six wards (1892-1909), published in The Globe, 1 January 1892.

Three aldermen were elected to Toronto City Council per ward. This was reduced from four aldermen per ward, previously.

First Ward (Riverdale)
Daniel Chisholm (incumbent) - 1,347
William Temple Stewart (incumbent) - 1,211
Robert Fleming (incumbent) - 1,163
James Wilson - 749
John Preston - 530

Second Ward (Cabbagetown and Rosedale)
Emerson Coatsworth - 1,845
Dr. John Noble (incumbent) - 1,362
Thomas Foster (incumbent) - 1,358
David Carlyle - 1,136
Edward Strachan Cox - 984
John W. Mogan - 800
W.A. Douglass - 707

Third Ward (Central Business District and The Ward)
Joseph George Ramsden (incumbent) - 2,191
Oliver Barton Sheppard (incumbent) - 2,098
George Reginald Geary - 1,716
George McMurrich - 1,604
Arthur Callow - 432

Fourth Ward (Spadina)
James Crane - 1,857
Stephen Alfred Jones - 1,850
Dr. William S. Harrison (incumbent) - 1,829
Stephen Wellesley Burns - 1,549
Robert Crawford Vaughan - 1,535
Edward James Hearn - 802
Albert Edward Hacker - 546
Charles Hambly - 230
Edmund Schilling - 105

Fifth Ward (Trinity-Bellwoods)
Frank Woods (incumbent) - 2,039
William Bell (incumbent) - 1,576
John Dunn (incumbent) - 1,511
John Bell Hay - 1,246
Alexander Stewart - 1,067
Peter Whytock - 1,003
Wellington O. McTaggart - 510
David Clark - 244

Sixth Ward (Brockton and Parkdale)
Jonn Joseph Ward (incumbent) - 1,581
James Henry McGhie (incumbent) - 1,446
John James Graham (incumbent) - 1,340
Dr. Adam Lynd (incumbent) - 1,219
Samuel Scott - 752

Source: and
