= 1902 Toronto municipal election =

Municipal elections in Toronto

Municipal elections were held in Toronto, Ontario, Canada, on January 6, 1902. In the mayoral election, Mayor Oliver Aiken Howland won a second term in office defeating William Findlay Maclean, a sitting Member of Parliament and founder of The Toronto World newspaper, who campaigned on a platform of public ownership, regulation and control over utilities such as waterworks, gasworks, electricity, and telephone, and the privately owned Toronto Railway Company (which operated the cities streetcar routes), as well as promising nighttime and Sunday streetcar service, and against temperance measures. Maclean's intention of simultaneously holding both the mayoralty and a seat in the Canadian House of Commons was a factor in his defeat. Another issue that hurt Maclean was his support for softening Toronto's blue law to allow for Sunday streetcar service. The third candidates was Charles Woodley who was the standard-bearer of the Socialist Labor Party.

== Toronto mayor ==
Results
Oliver Aiken Howland (incumbent) - 13,424
William Findlay Maclean, M.P. - 8,774
Charles Christopher Woodley - 633

== Board of Control ==
The Toronto Board of Control was, in 1902, elected by Toronto City Council from among its members. At the first council meeting following the general election, council chose Aldermen Graham, Crane, Loudon and McMurrich to sit on the body, which was chaired by the Mayor.

== Plebiscites ==
A plebiscite was held on a by-law to authorize expenditure on new buildings on the Exhibition grounds.

Exhibition buildings
For - 5,097
Against - 3,342

== City council ==
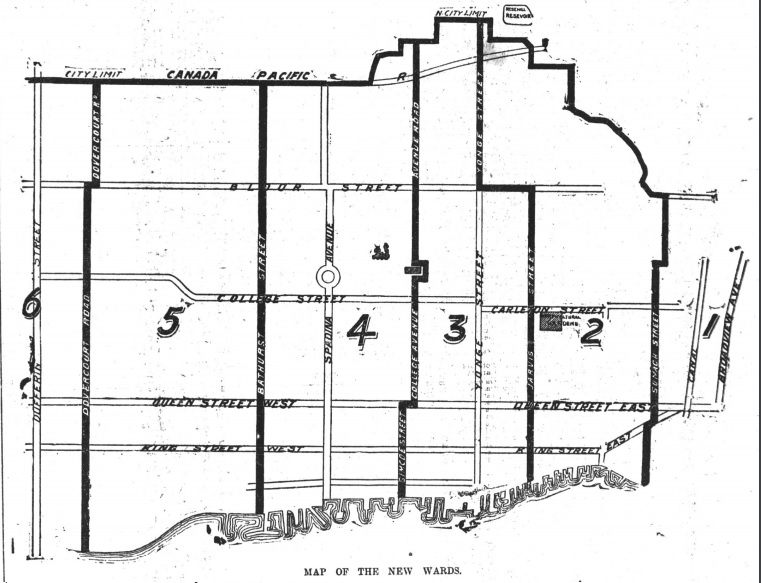
Map of Toronto's six wards (1892-1909), published in The Globe, 1 January 1892.

Four aldermen were elected to Toronto City Council per ward. Former mayor John Shaw attempted to win an aldermanic seat in the Third Ward, but was defeated.

First Ward (Riverdale)
James Frame (incumbent) - 1,684
Robert Fleming - 1,614
Fred H. Richardson (incumbent) - 1,301
William Temple Stewart (incumbent) - 1,203
John Preston - 1,126
Dr. Hugh Spears - 326

Second Ward (Cabbagetown and Rosedale)
Frank S. Spence - 2,318
Joseph Oliver (incumbent) - 2,050
Thomas Foster (incumbent) - 1,825
Daniel Lamb (incumbent) - 1,626
Edward Strachan Cox (incumbent) - 1,525
John Akers - 1,081
John Henderson - 615
W.A. Douglass - 405

Third Ward (Central Business District and The Ward)
Oliver Barton Sheppard (incumbent) - 2,578
Samuel George Curry - 2,551
George McMurrich (incumbent) - 2,526
John Francis Loudon (incumbent) - 2,233
Henry Sheard (incumbent) - 2,070
Joseph George Ramsden - 1,832

Fourth Ward (Spadina)
Thomas Urquhart - 3,280
William Burns (incumbent) -2,803
James Crane (incumbent) - 2,709
William Peyton Hubbard (incumbent) - 2,496
Alex R. Williamson - 1,830
Edmund Schilling - 254

Fifth Ward (Trinity-Bellwoods)
William Bell (incumbent) - 2,017
John Dunn - 1,914
Frank Woods (incumbent) - 1,892
Alexander Stewart - 1,632
James Russell Lovett Starr (incumbent) - 1,581
Dr. William Stewart Fraleigh (incumbent) - 1,332
H.E. Hamilton - 769

Sixth Ward (Brockton and Parkdale)
John Joseph Ward (incumbent) - 1,604
John James Graham (incumbent) - 1,551
Dr. Adam Lynd (incumbent) - 1,319
J.Harvey Hall - 1,178
James Henry McGhie - 989
W.W. Hodgson (incumbent) - 929
William O'Neill - 245
R.H. Holmes - 216
Robert Buist Noble - 210

Source: and
