= 1913 Toronto municipal election =

Municipal elections were held in Toronto, Ontario, Canada, on January 1, 1913. H.C. Hocken was elected to his first full term as mayor.

== Toronto mayor ==
Mayor George Reginald Geary had resigned part way through his term and Hocken, who had received the most votes in the Board of Control election was appointed to succeed him. No major opponent emerged to challenge Hocken, but on the day of the nomination Thomas Davies chose to run.

Results
H.C. Hocken (incumbent) - 27,983
Thomas Davies - 9,003

== Board of Control ==
There was one change to the Board of Control as Alderman John O'Neill won a seat defeating Frank S. Spence.

Thomas Foster (incumbent) - 15,861
John O'Neill - 14,600
J.O. McCarthy (incumbent) - 14,036
Tommy Church (incumbent) - 12,765
Frank S. Spence - 11,976
Robert Yeomens - 10,713
James Simpson - 10,122
Charles A. Maguire (incumbent) - 9,388
J.J. Ward - 9,278
George R. Sweeny - 1,643
Richard Woods - 498

== City council ==
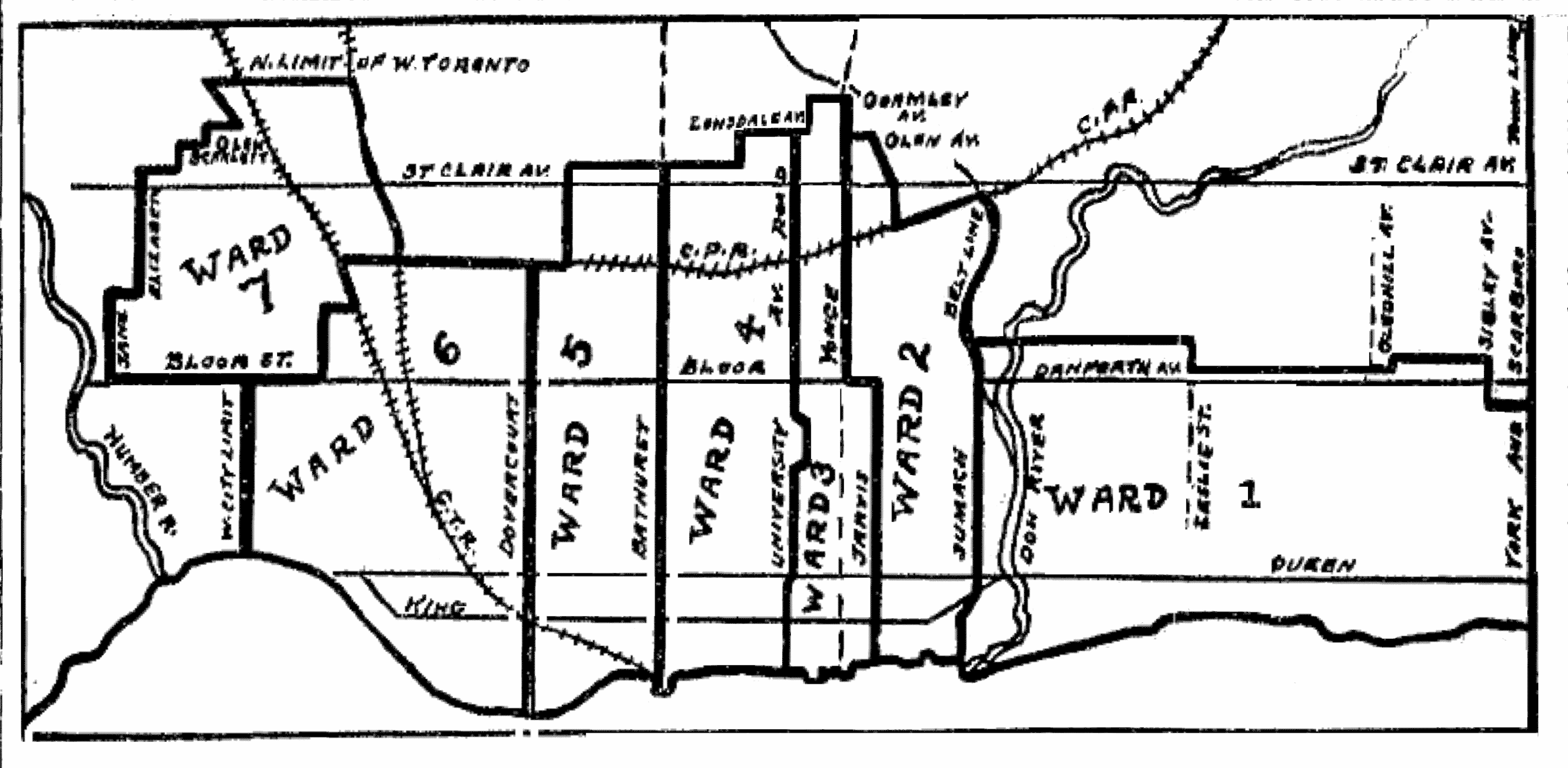
A map of Toronto's seven municipal wards as they existed for elections for elections from 1910 until 1918, inclusive. (Source: Toronto Daily Star, 18 December 1909)

Ward 1 (Riverdale)
William D. Robbins (incumbent) - 4,030
Albert Edwin Walton - 3,789
William Peyton Hubbard - 3,611
William John Saunderson (incumbent) - 1,935
William Edward Orr - 1,209
Frank Britton - 602

Ward 2 (Cabbagetown and Rosedale)
S. Morley Wickett - 3,185
Charles A. Risk - 2,844
H.A. Rowland (incumbent) - 2,611
Herbert Henry Ball - 1,686
C.H. Beavis - 789
James Henry - 543

Ward 3 (Central Business District and The Ward)
Marmaduke Rawlinson (incumbent) - 2,666
Alfred Burgess - 2,146
Sam McBride (incumbent) - 1,793
David Bell - 1,702
Duncan D. Reid - 1,138
George Jarratt Castle - 993
Harry Winberg - 814

Ward 4 (Kensington Market and Garment District)
John Wanless (incumbent) - 2,799
George Weston (incumbent) - 2,597
George McMurrich (incumbent) - 2,341
Robert McLeod - 1,634
John Shayne - 1,569

Ward 5 (Trinity-Bellwoods)
John Wesley Meredith - 2,784
John Dunn (incumbent) - 2,764
Joseph May (incumbent) - 2,717
R.H. Graham (incumbent) - 2,376
R.W. Dockeray - 2,154
S.A. Frost - 1,704

Ward 6 (Brockton and Parkdale)
Charles H. Maybee - 4,707
Fred McBrien (incumbent) - 3,571
David Spence (incumbent) - 3,537
John A. Austin (incumbent) - 2,865
R.J. Clarke - 2,106
J. Stewart - 1,146
Thomas Earls - 345

Ward 7 (West Toronto Junction)
A.J. Anderson (incumbent) - 1,122
Samuel Ryding (incumbent) - 780
John A. Macdonald - 545
John Mullin - 261

Results taken from the January 2, 1913 Toronto Daily Star and might not exactly match final tallies.

== Vacancy ==
Ward 4 Alderman George McMurrich dies September 7, 1913 and is not replaced.
