= 1899 Toronto municipal election =

Mayor election in Canada

Municipal elections were held in Toronto, Canada, on January 2, 1899. Mayor John Shaw was elected for his third consecutive term in office defeating opponent Ernest A. Macdonald and Third Ward Alderman George McMurrich. It was Macdonald's third unsuccessful attempt to be elected mayor, and McMurrich's second. Macdonald would succeed in his fourth attempt, at the 1900 Toronto municipal election.

== Toronto mayor ==
Results
John Shaw (incumbent) - 11,175
Ernest A. Macdonald - 10,465
Alderman George McMurrich - 3,745

== Board of Control ==
The Toronto Board of Control was elected by Toronto City Council from among its members, and presided over by the mayor. At the first council meeting following the general election, council chose Aldermen Burns, Lynd, and Woods to sit on the body.

== Plebiscites ==
Three by-laws authorizing expenditures were approved by plebiscite: $62,500 for the erection of the Queen Street Viaduct spanning the Don River; $150,00 for the remodelling of St. Lawrence Market, and $40,000 for waterfront improvements at the foot of Bay Street.

Don River Bridge
Yea - 3,605
Nay - 2,740

St. Lawrence Market
Yea - 4,524
Nay - 2,188

Waterfront
Yea - 3,723
Nay - 2,459

== Aldermen elected to City Council ==
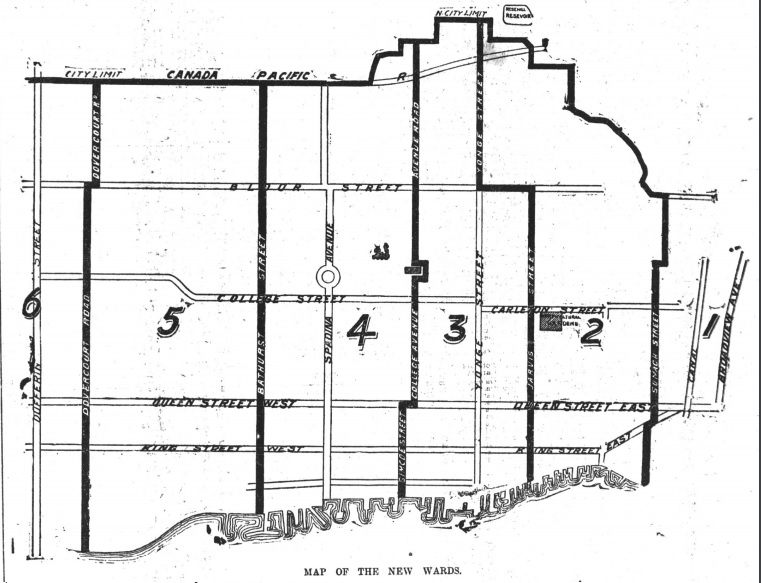
Map of Toronto's six wards (1892–1909), published in The Globe, 1 January 1892.

Four alderman were elected to sit on Toronto City Council in each of six wards.

Only two aldermen seeking re-election were defeated, both in the First Ward: John Leslie, who had also sat on the city's powerful Toronto Board of Control (which at this time was still chosen by city council rather than elected), and Alderman Richardson who were replaced by former alderman Stewart and John Russell. In the Second Ward, former alderman Francis Stephens Spence filled the vacancy left by the retirement of Alderman Bryce. In the Third Ward, former alderman N.L. Steiner filled the vacancy left by Alderman McMurrich's mayoral candidacy.

First Ward
James Frame (incumbent) - 1,589
John Russell - 1,109
H.R. Frankland (incumbent) - 1,091
Wm. T. Stewart - 1,091
John Knox Leslie (incumbent) - 1,058
F.A. Richardson (incumbent)- 1,013
Thomas Allen - 868
E.M. Corker - 281
C.C. Woodley - 121
Dr. Spiers - 80

Second Ward
John Hallam (incumbent) - 2,052
Daniel Lamb (incumbent) - 1,949
Francis Stephens Spence - 1,923
Thos. Davies (incumbent) - 1,761
E. Strachan Cox - 1,684
Thomas Foster - 1,349
Garrett F. Frankland - 876
W.L. Beale - 740
William Thompson - 151
James O'Hara - 126

Third Ward
O.B. Sheppard (incumbent) - 3,225
Bernard Saunders (incumbent) - 2,886
Richard John Score (incumbent) - 2,503
N.L. Steiner - 1,795
James Allison - 1,557
W.E. Raney - 1,515
George Boxall - 917
Arthur Bollard - 615
A. Hepburn - 187

Fourth Ward
Wm. Burns (incumbent) - 2,870
James Crane (incumbent) - 2,818
Edward Hanlan (incumbent) - 2,373
Wm. P. Hubbard (incumbent) - 2,318
Thomas Urquhart - 2,288
S.W. Burns - 2,057
H.W. Paull - 1,016
Thomas Roberts - 238

Fifth Ward
A.R. Denison (incumbent) - 2,281
Francis H. Woods (incumbent) - 2,145
John Dunn (incumbent) - 2,116
Robt. H. Graham (incumbent) - 1,888
Dr. William Stewart Fraleigh - 1,814
H.E. Hamilton - 1,092
Alex Stewart - 783
J.B. Banks - 277
C.A. Muerie - 197
John Ward - 190
F.J. Sabine - 99
Edward Schilling - 42

Sixth Ward
John J. Graham (incumbent) - 1,499
James Gowanlock (incumbent) - 1,492
James M. Bowman (incumbent) - 1,328
Adam Lynd M.D. (incumbent) - 1,289
Alex Asher - 1,026
J.J. Ward - 672
Hugh MacMath - 635
Thomas Hurst - 440
William Dean - 220
Robert Buist Noble - 114
J.H. Hall - 70
John Fawcett - 67
J.C. McLean - 49
H.M. Mulholland - 43
