= 1909 Toronto municipal election =

Municipal elections were held in Toronto, Ontario, Canada, on January 1, 1909. Joseph Oliver was easily re-elected to his second term as Mayor of Toronto. One of the central issues of the campaign was whether the city should construct a bridge over the Don River connecting Bloor Street to Danforth Avenue. A referendum was held as part of the vote, and the bridge was approved. It would be built as the Prince Edward Viaduct.

== Toronto mayor ==
Oliver had been elected in the 1908 election, and was easily reelected while facing no serious opposition.

Results
Joseph Oliver (incumbent) - 27,128
Thomas Davies - 8,127
James Lindala - 1,735
Joel Marvin Briggs - 327

== Board of Control ==
The election was accompanied by a referendum on reducing the number of licensed bars in the city by 40. The measure passed, but in a surprise upset Controller Frank S. Spence, who was the strongest advocate for the measure, was defeated. His place on the Toronto Board of Control was taken by former Alderman George Reginald Geary who had been defeated by Oliver for Mayor the year previously. Alderman James Hales also tried to gain a seat on the board.

George Reginald Geary - 20,136
Horatio Clarence Hocken (incumbent) - 17,630
J.J. Ward (incumbent) - 15,782
William Spence Harrison (incumbent) - 14,037
Frank S. Spence (incumbent) - 13,296
William Peyton Hubbard - 11,391
James Hales - 8,462
Robert Buist Noble - 1,393
James O'Hara - 808

== City council ==
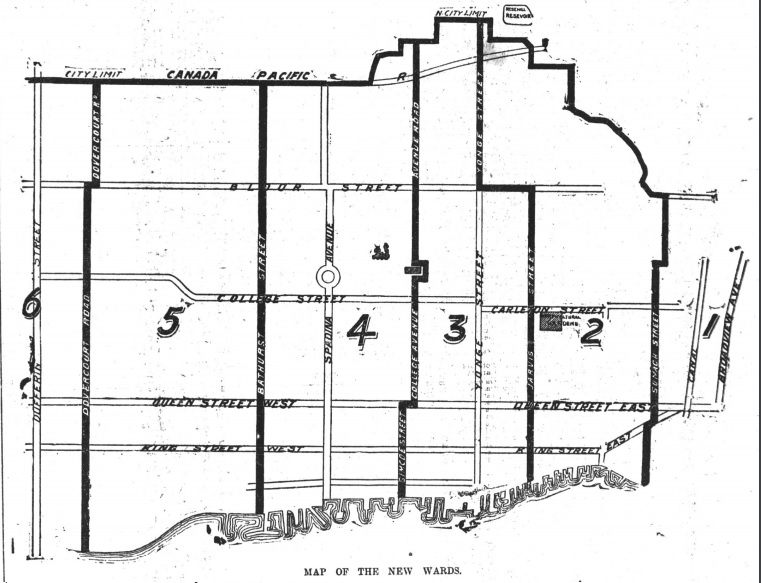
Map of Toronto's six wards (1892-1909), published in The Globe, 1 January 1892. Ward 7 would be added on May 29, 1909, due to the annexation of West Toronto.

Three aldermen were elected to Toronto City Council per ward.

Ward 1 (Riverdale)
Daniel Chisholm (incumbent) - 2,104
Zephaniah Hilton - 1,836
Andrew McMillan - 1,824
Thomas N. Phelan - 1,748
William Temple Stewart (incumbent) - 1,392
William J. Saunderson (incumbent) - 1,246
Robert Fleming - 1,039
John Macpherson Ross - 912
William Totten - 488
William Worrell - 472
John Linden - 213

Ward 2 (Cabbagetown and Rosedale)
Tommy Church (incumbent) - 2,776
John O'Neill - 2,496
Thomas Foster (incumbent) - 1,981
John Noble - 1,421
Robert Yeomans - 1,241
William Norton Eastwood - 916
Ewart Farquahar - 517
William Alexander Douglas - 502
Frederick Hogg - 359
Richard Wallace - 328

Ward 3 (Central Business District and The Ward)
Mark Bredin (incumbent) - 2,989
John Wilson Bengough (incumbent) - 2,630
Charles A. Maguire - 2,488
Sam McBride (incumbent) - 2,391
Oliver B. Sheppard - 2,309
Stewart Nassau Hughes - 1,323
Louis Gurofsky - 660
John Kirk - 519
Thomas Egan - 509
Paul Levi - 298

Ward 4 (Kensington Market and Garment District)
George McMurrich (incumbent) - 3,599
R.C. Vaughan (incumbent) - 2,173
Albert Welch - 2,974
James Brandon - 2,735
Thomas Alexander Lytle (incumbent) - 2,248

Ward 5 (Trinity-Bellwoods)
Robert Henry Graham (incumbent) - 3,191
John Dunn - 2,933
Albert James Keeler (incumbent) - 2,946
Peter Whytock (incumbent) - 2,626
Joseph May - 2,213
John L. Richardson - 1,357
Robert William Dockeray - 1,792
Thomas Gillies - 519
Frederick Jenkins - 509

Ward 6 (Brockton and Parkdale)
James Henry McGhie (incumbent) - 3,453
John James Graham (incumbent) - 3,043
J.H. Adams (incumbent) - 2,456
Fred McBrien - 2,444
James Arthur McCausland - 2,273
William Hodgson - 754
Thomas Mathison - 578

== Creation of Ward 7 ==
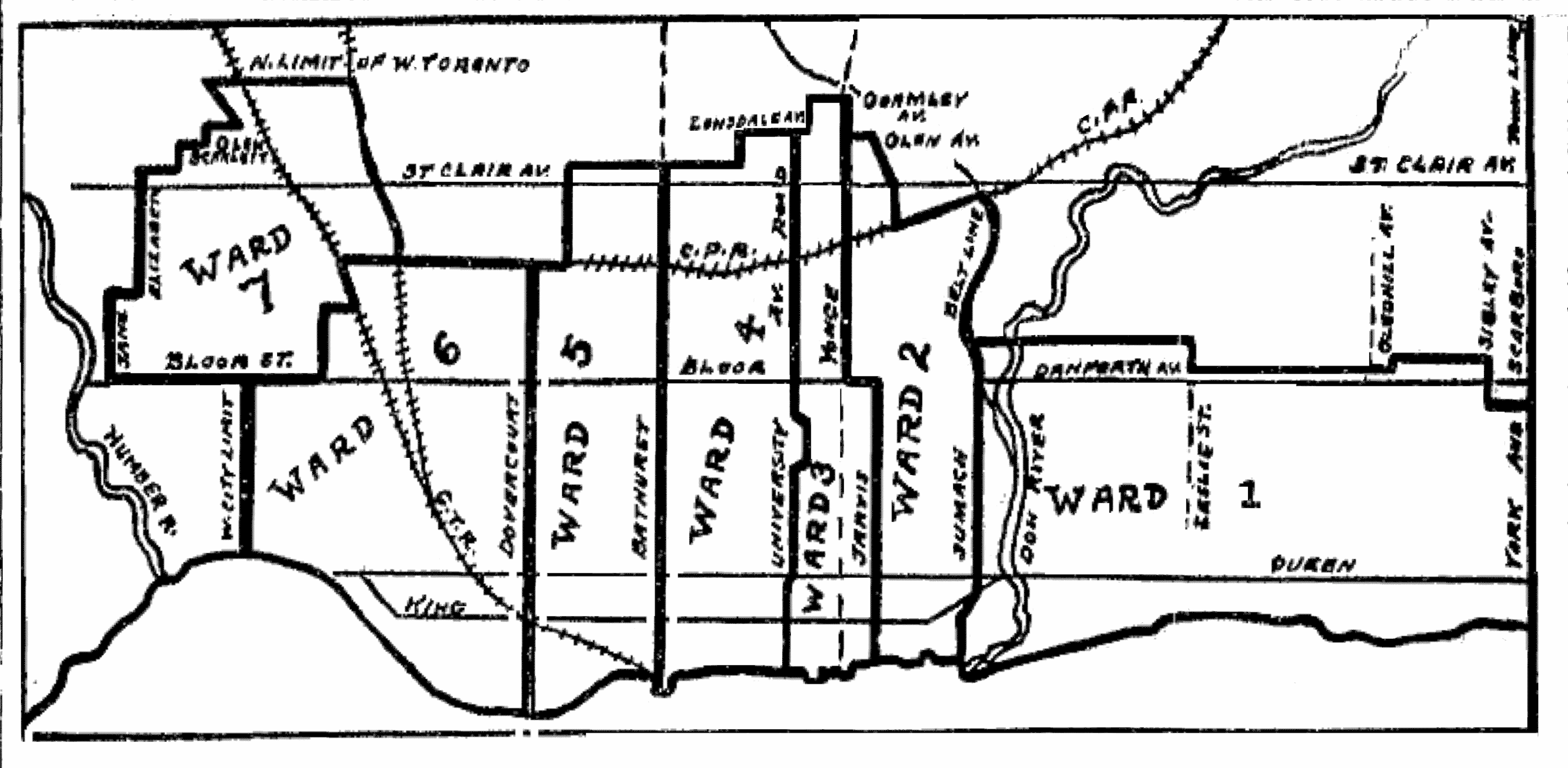
The new ward map introduced with the creation of Ward 7. (Source: Toronto Daily Star, 18 December 1909)

The City of West Toronto was annexed on May 1, 1909 and became Ward 7. Due to its smaller size it would only have two aldermen until the population of the ward reached 30,000 on the assessment roll. A by-election was held on May 29, 1909.

Ward 7
A.J. Anderson - 777
William Alexander Baird - 603
Samuel Ryding - 363
Jesse C. Smith - 337
Joseph S. Bull - 282
