= 1910 Toronto municipal election =

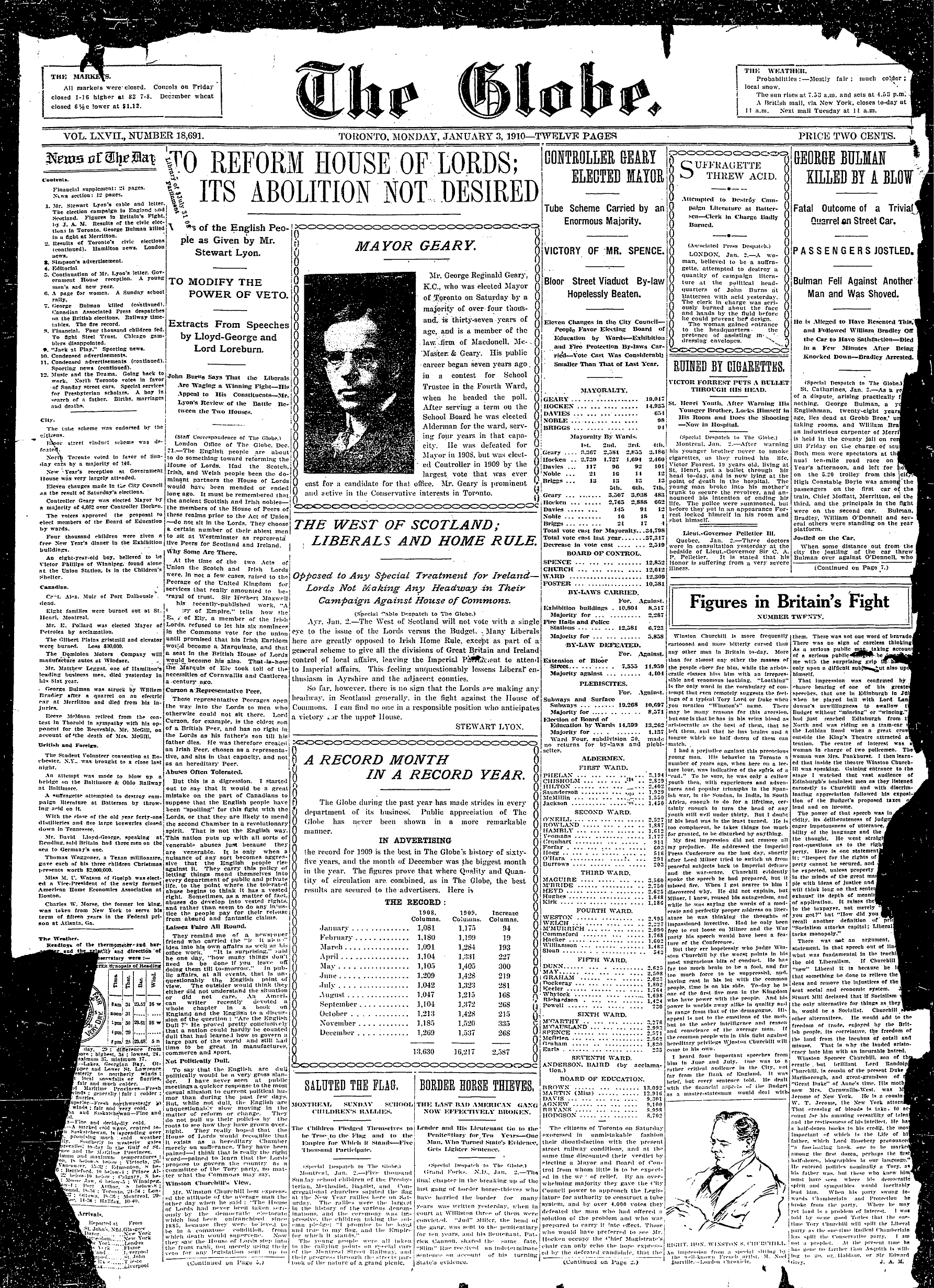
Toronto's The Globe from 3 January 1910 showing the results of the 1910 municipal election.

Municipal elections were held in Toronto, Ontario, Canada, on 1 January 1910. George Reginald Geary was elected to his first term as mayor. Two plebiscites were passed:

1. To build a tube and surface subway transit system;
2. Election of Board of Education by wards.

Three by-laws were also voted on, two passed. The approved by-laws were:

1. Building new buildings on the Canadian Exhibition Grounds;
2. Building more fire and police stations.

The by-law that failed to win approval was the one calling for the extension of Bloor Street by means of a viaduct.

== Voting eligibility ==
Unlike the present era, the right to vote was not universal to all citizens. Notably, since 1884, most women were still not allowed to vote as they had to be either a widow or single, and own land. There were also restrictions on which men could vote on what options. A complicated system based on what land was owned or leased decided if a person could vote on the money by-laws or not. The following excerpt from The Globe explains the process:

Every elector entitled to vote for Mayor has one vote on the subway or tube question. Every elector entitled to vote for the Board of Education has a vote on the question of returning to the ward system of electing trustees, or retaining the present system of electing trustees by general vote. The only persons entitled to vote on the three money by-laws are freeholders marked on the voters' list "M, F. & F." or "F." In previous years all persons marked on the voters' list "Lessee" had the right to vote on debenture by-laws, but the law has been changed in this regard. There are exceptions, however, where a person has a long lease which entitles him to vote. In such cases there will be an entry in the voters' list, "Entitled to vote on debenture by-laws."

== Toronto mayor ==
Mayor Joseph Oliver did not run for re-election. George Reginald Geary had run for the mayor's office in 1908 but lost to Oliver before winning a seat on the Board of Control the next year. In an open race in 1910, Geary's main opponent was fellow Controller Horatio Clarence Hocken, founder of the Toronto Star and social reformer whom he defeated by 4,000 votes.

Results
George Reginald Geary - 18,996
Horatio Clarence Hocken - 14,999
Thomas Davies - 644
Robert Buist Noble - 192
Joel Marvin Briggs - 93

== Board of Control ==
_{All results are sourced from the 3 January 1910 The Globe, page one.}
Two spots opened up on the Toronto Board of Control as a result of Controllers Geary and Hocken both running for mayor. Tommy Church and Thomas Foster joined the Board for the first time and Frank S. Spence returned, this time topping the vote, after being defeated the previous year. William Spence Harrison was defeated meaning only one incumbent, Labourite J.J. Ward, was re-elected.

Frank S. Spence - 13,879
J.J. Ward (incumbent) - 13,401
Tommy Church - 12,657
Thomas Foster - 10,841
William Spence Harrison (incumbent) - 9,946
William Peyton Hubbard - 9,498
Mark Bredin - 8,708
James Henry McGhie - 7,511
James Hales - 5,852
Albert Chamberlain - 2,730

== City council ==
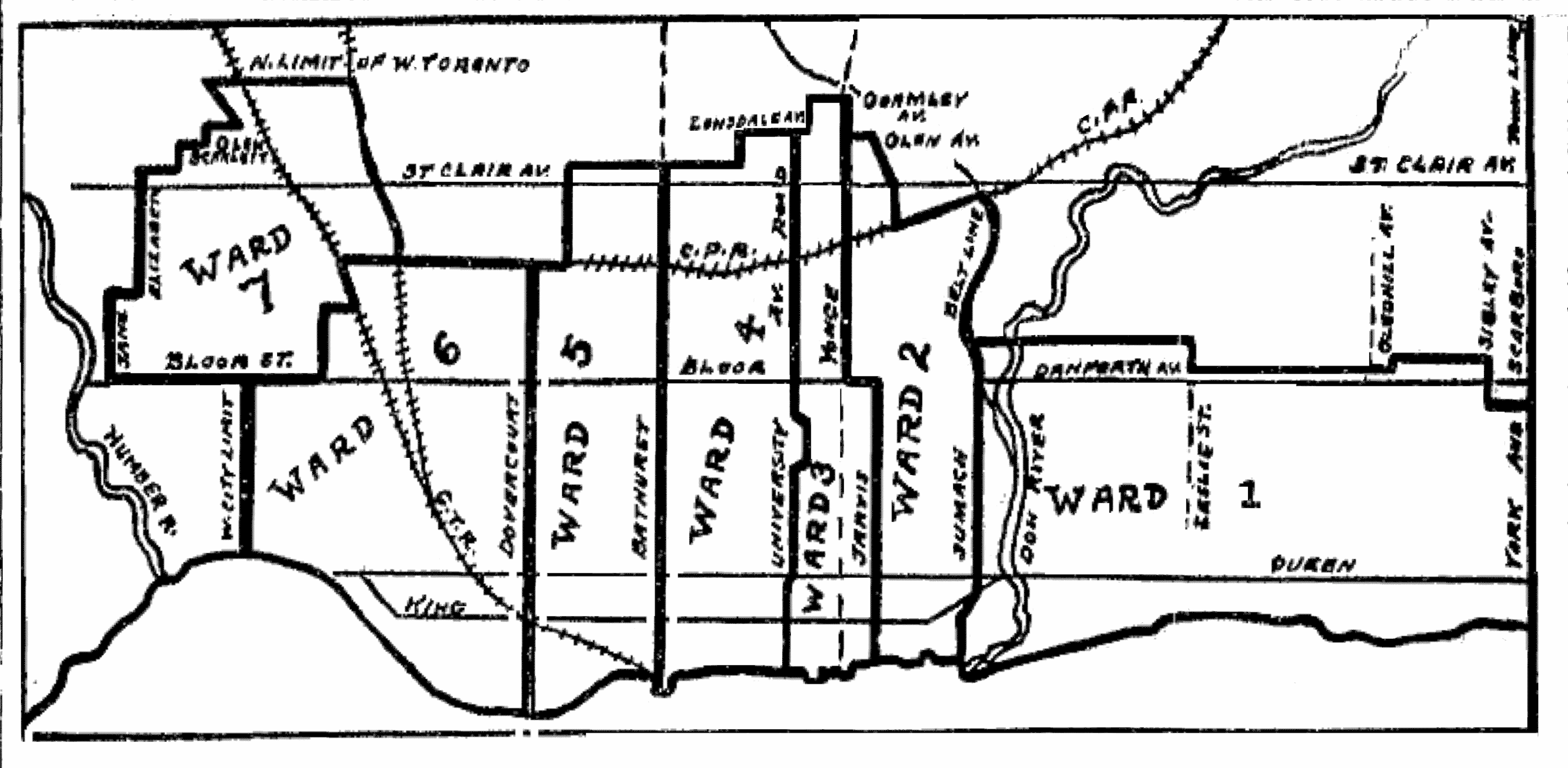
A map of Toronto's seven municipal wards as they appeared for the 1 January 1910 election. (Source: Toronto Daily Star)

Ward 1
Thomas N. Phelan - 3,194
Daniel Chisholm (incumbent) - 2,887
Zephaniah Hilton (incumbent) - 2,402
William J. Saunderson - 1,957
Andrew McMillan (incumbent) - 1,550
James William Jackson - 1,449

Ward 2
John O'Neill (incumbent) - 2,544
Henry Adams Rowland - 1,877
William J. Hambly - 1,647
Robert Yeomans - 1,234
Donald Urquhart - 900
James Edward Forfar - 573
Frederick Hogg - 460
James O'Hara - 269
Frederick Burrows - 186

Ward 3
Charles A. Maguire (incumbent) - 3,623
Sam McBride - 2,759
Norman Heyd - 2,619
Stewart Nassau Hughes - 1658
John Kirk - 1,291

Ward 4
George Weston - 2,895
Albert Welch (incumbent) - 2,226
George McMurrich (incumbent) - 2,228
James Commeford - 1,776
A.E. Hacker - 1,602
A.R. Williamson - 1,462
J.N Sloan - 483

Ward 5
John Dunn (incumbent) - 2,605
Joseph May - 2,508
Robert Henry Graham (incumbent) - 2,023
Robert William Dockeray - 1,792
Albert James Keeler (incumbent) - 1,764
Peter Whytock - 1,698
John L. Richardson - 1,414
Richard Pugh Powell - 730

Ward 6
Jesse O. McCarthy - 3,276
James Arthur McCausland - 2,992
David Spence - 2,571
Fred McBrien - 2,562
John James Graham (incumbent) - 1,830
Thomas Edward Earls - 235

Ward 7
A.J. Anderson (incumbent) - acclaimed
William Alexander Baird (incumbent) - acclaimed
