= 1895 Toronto municipal election =

Election in Toronto, Canada

Municipal elections were held in Toronto, Canada, on January 8, 1895. Mayor Warring Kennedy was narrowly elected to a second term in office, narrowly defeating former mayor Robert John Fleming, in a rematch of the previous year's election. Kennedy was re-elected based on support from the Protestant Protective Association and the Orange Order. The main issue in the election was a proposal championed by former alderman Ernest A. Macdonald to build an aqueduct or canal linking the Humber River with Georgian Bay; with opponents of the scheme being returned to council while proponents were defeated.

== Toronto mayor ==
Results
Warring Kennedy (incumbent) - 10,260
Robert John Fleming - 10,212

vote totals are after recounts

== Aldermen elected to City Council ==
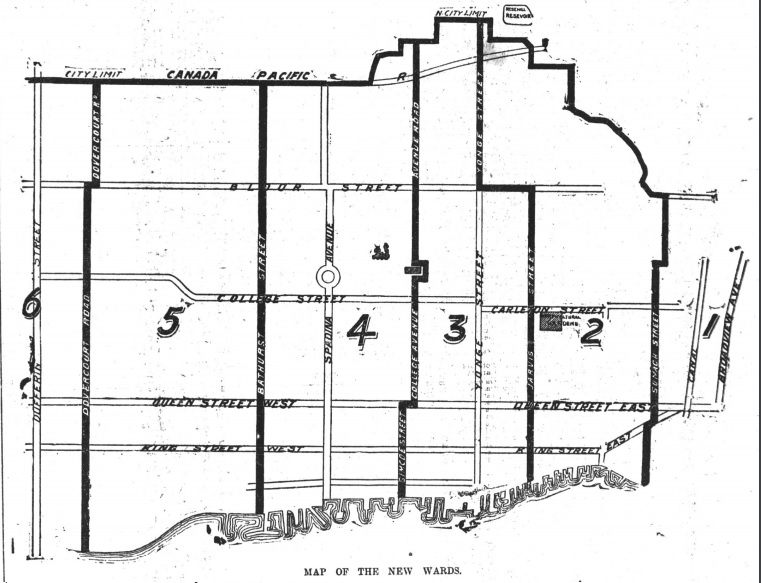
Map of Toronto's six wards (1892-1909), published in The Globe, 1 January 1892.

Four alderman were elected to sit on Toronto City Council in each of six wards. Fourteen incumbents were re-elected; four rookie alderman were elected and four candidates who were not on council in 1894 but had been in previous years, returned.

First Ward
Thomas Allen (incumbent) - 1,149
Edward Blong - 1,099
John Knox Leslie- 992
H.R. Frankland (incumbent) - 954
C.C. Small (incumbent) - 840
William Barrett - 784
Peter Macdonald (incumbent) - 661
Harry Ellis - 442
G.S. Macdonald - 323

Second Ward
Daniel Lamb (incumbent) - 1,756
John Hallam (incumbent) - 1,635
Joseph Oliver - 1,398
Thomas Davies (incumbent) - 1,339
Francis S. Spence - 1,298
George Anderson - 1,039
Thomas Foster (incumbent) - 1,026
Dr. Samuel G. Thompson - 925
William L. Beale - 643
Ewart Farquahar - 535
James O'Hara - 202
Joseph A. Livingstone - 40

Third Ward
George McMurrich (incumbent) - 2,507
John Shaw 2,410
Bernard Saunders - 1,888
O.B. Sheppard (incumbent) - 1,759
James B. Boustead- 1,751
Wallace Millichamp - 1,185
J.A. Proctor - 927
A.G. McLean - 877
Frank Somers - 854
R.L. Fraser - 818
Ernest A. Macdonald - 693
Dr. McCully - 249

Fourth Ward
William Burns (incumbent) - 2,217
Wm. P. Hubbard (incumbent) - 2,213
James Crane (incumbent) - 1,839
James Jolliffe (incumbent) -1,189
B. Alison - 1,084
George Verral - 979
A.F. Jury - 903
Thompson Porter - 795
Alex R. Williamson - 697
George Williams - 512
Henry Cohen - 353

Fifth Ward
Robert H. Graham - 1,638
William Bell - 1,595
John Dunn (incumbent) - 1,587
Andrew Bates (incumbent) - 1,098
Arthur R. Denison - 1,001
William Dunlop - 630
Dr. A. Noxon - 622
L.K. Munro - 569
George Evans - 244
John Ward - 244
William J. Smith - 180
Louis Richey - 88
James S. Martin - 87

Sixth Ward
James Scott - 1,391
Thomas Murray (incumbent) - 1,094
Gorge Gilbert Rowe - 1,009
John J. Graham (incumbent) - 849
Charles L. Denison - 745
Henry M. East - 597
W.J. Peck - 444
John C. McLean - 353
J.R. Code - 281
Thomas Lilly - 279
Arthur Bollard - 173
Dr. John Hunter - 157
R.H. Holmes - 40

Source: and
