= 1906 Toronto municipal election =

Municipal elections were held in Toronto, Ontario, Canada, on January 1, 1906. The position of Mayor of Toronto was open as the incumbent, Thomas Urquhart, did not stand for re-election. Alderman Emerson Coatsworth defeated Controller Frank S. Spence.

Also on the ballot were plebiscites on two liquor licensing proposals which would have reduced the number of taverns and stores permitted to sell alcohol. Controller Spence supported the by-laws and attributed his defeat to its opponents.

== Toronto mayor ==
Results
Ald. Emerson Coatsworth - 16,425
Controller Frank Spence - 12,328

== Board of Control ==
The three members of the Toronto Board of Control running for re-election were successful. Alderman Jones was elected to fill the vacant seat formerly held by Controller Spence.

Results
William Peyton Hubbard (incumbent) - 14,081
S. Alfred Jones - 14,039
J.J. Ward (incumbent) - 13,770
John Shaw (incumbent) - 12,524
Thomas Hastings - 11,308

Source: and

== Plebiscites ==
Two liquor licensing by-laws were on the ballot, one to reduce the number of taverns allowed to sell alcohol, the second to reduce the number of liquor stores. Both measures were defeated.

Reduction of the number of taverns
Yes - 13,409
No - 14,629

Reduction of shops.
Yes - 12,750
No - 14,904

== City council ==
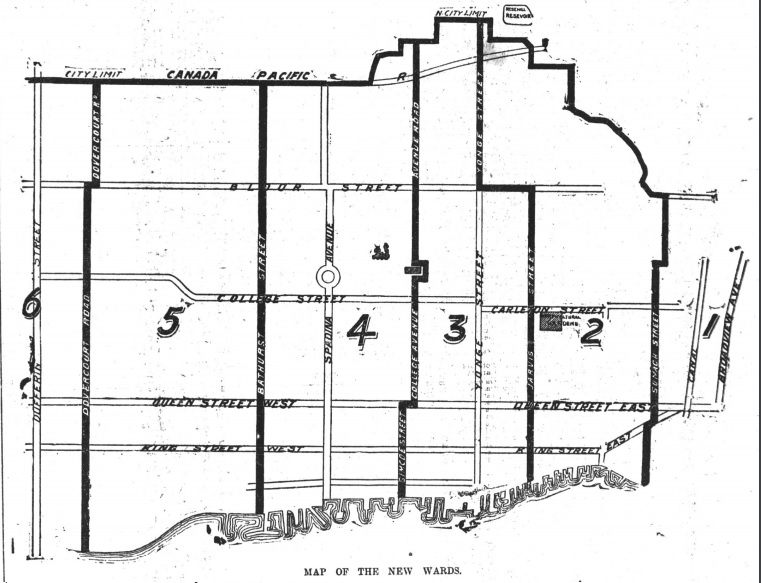
Map of Toronto's six wards (1892-1909), published in The Globe, 1 January 1892.

Three aldermen were elected to Toronto City Council per ward. In the Second Ward, Joseph Oliver filled the vacancy left by Ald. Emerson Coatsworth mayoral candidacy. In the Fourth Ward, George McMurrich filled the vacancy left by Alderman Jones, who ran for Board of Control. In Sixth Ward, John Henry Adams replaced Alderman Lynd, who retired.

First Ward (Riverdale)
Daniel Chisholm (incumbent) - 1,979
Robert Fleming (incumbent) - 1,565
William Temple Stewart (incumbent) - 1,406
Edward Hales - 1,288
James Wilson - 1,222
J.M. Briggs - 180

Second Ward (Cabbagetown and Rosedale)
Joseph Oliver - 1,715
Dr. John Noble (incumbent) - 1,660
Tommy Church (incumbent) - 1,590
Edward Strachan Cox - 1,507
James Hales - 1,358
David Carlyle - 1,137
Thomas Foster - 997
W.S. Johnston - 787
W.A. Douglass - 366
Frederick Burrows - 179

Third Ward (Central Business District and The Ward)
George Reginald Geary (incumbent) - 3,034
Oliver Barton Sheppard (incumbent) - 2,681
Sam McBride (incumbent) - 2,544
John Wilson Bengough - 2,395
Frank Moses - 1,148
J.A. Humphrey - 1,118
John Dunlop - 104

Fourth Ward (Spadina)
Dr. D.W.S. Harrison (incumbent) - 3,094
Robert Crawford Vaughan (incumbent) - 3,009
George McMurrich - 2,386
Fred Dane - 2,176
E.J. Humphrey - 1,414
Edward Hanlan - 1,305

Fifth Ward (Trinity-Bellwoods)
John Dunn (incumbent) - 2,846
John Bell Hay (incumbent) - 2,263
Albert James Keeler (incumbent) - 2,237
Frank Woods - 2,055
James Cooper Claxton- 2,055

Sixth Ward (Brockton and Parkdale)
James Henry McGhie (incumbent) - 2,367
John James Graham (incumbent) - 2,037
John Henry Adams - 1,569
J. Harvey Hall - 1,074
Walter Mann - 742
D.R. Bell - 642
J.E. Stewart - 607
W.H. Warrington - 436
Thomas Cannon - 389
R.B. Noble - 191

Source: and
