= 1908 Toronto municipal election =

Municipal elections were held in Toronto, Ontario, Canada, on January 1, 1908. Mayor Emerson Coatsworth did not run for a third term.

Joseph Oliver was elected to his first term as Mayor of Toronto. Oliver, who was considered a Liberal, defeated Alderman George Reginald Geary and Dr. Beattie Nesbitt who were both Conservative supporters as well as James Simpson, running as a socialist. Geary would go on to serve as mayor from 1910 to 1912 as well as sit as a Conservative Member of Parliament from 1925 to 1935. Simpson would later serve on the Toronto Board of Control in 1914 and again in the 1930s and would be elected mayor in 1935. A plebiscite was also held which approved the creation of the publicly owned Toronto Hydro-Electric System and public ownership of the Toronto Suburban Railway and Toronto Eastern Railway, which were both interurban electric streetcar systems.

== Toronto mayor ==
Results
Joseph Oliver - 14,022
Alderman George Reginald Geary - 7,124
Dr Beattie Nesbitt - 6,504
James Simpson - 3,701
Miles Vokes - 964

Source: "OLIVER IS TORONTO'S MAYOR; NESBITT OVERWHELMED', The Globe, page 1, January 2, 1908.

== Plebiscite ==
A plebiscite was held on "the power by-law" in municipalities across the province to create publicly owned municipal hydro-electric utilities in order to access hydro-electric power from Niagara Falls. The Toronto Hydro-Electric System (now Toronto Hydro) was created as a result. The plebiscite also authorized the city to take into public ownership the Toronto Suburban Railway and Toronto Eastern Railway, to create a public interurban electrical transit system referred to as a "hydro-radial" system.

The by-law was approved in Toronto by a vote of 14,078 to 4,483.

== Board of Control ==
Three incumbent members of the Toronto Board of Control were re-elected, Controller William Peyton Hubbard was displaced by Frank Spence.

Horatio Clarence Hocken (incumbent) - 16,844
Frank S. Spence - 11,542
William Spence Harrison (incumbent) - 10,310
J.J. Ward (incumbent) - 10,075
William Peyton Hubbard (incumbent) - 9,203
John Shaw - 6,385
Robert Fleming - 5,648
Oliver B. Sheppard - 5,099
John Dunn - 4,435
John Enoch Thompson - 1,294
James Lindala - 1,220
Hugh MacMath - 1,013
Robert Buist Noble - 745
James O'Hara - 307
Joel Marvin Briggs - 232

Source: The Globe, page 3, January 2, 1908, and "MANY IN FIGHT FOR MAYORALTY: Seven Candidates Nominated at the City Hall WOULD-BE CONTROLLERS Large Crop of Nominees, Including Present Board Fifteen Men and One Woman in the List for Places on the Board of education-- The Socialists Have a Ticket-- Speeches of the Various Candidates FOR MAYOR", The Globe, 24 Dec 1907: 11.

== City council ==
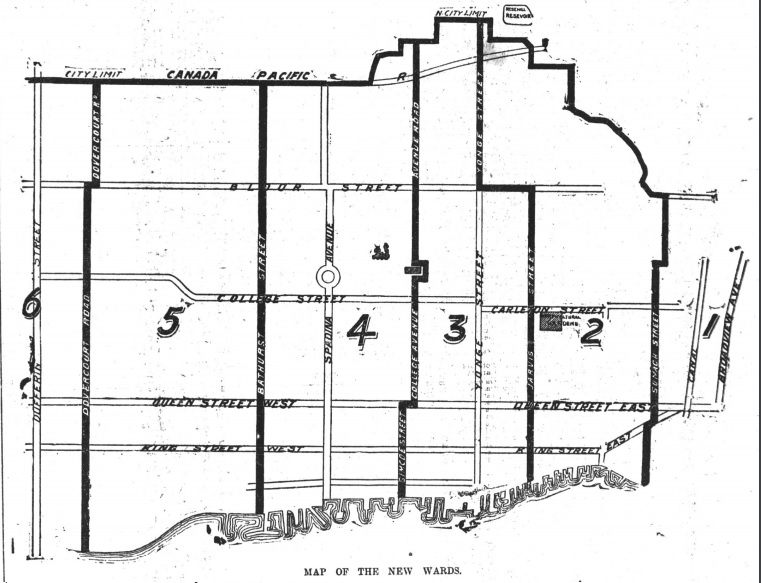
Map of Toronto's six wards (1892-1909), published in The Globe, 1 January 1892.

Three aldermen were elected to Toronto City Council per ward. There were only two changes from the previous council, Alderman Hales was defeated in Ward 1 by William Temple Stewart and in Ward 3, Mark Bredin filled the seat vacated by Alderman Geary, who unsuccessfully ran for mayor.

Ward 1 (Riverdale)
Daniel Chisholm (incumbent) - 2,079
William Temple Stewart - 1,439
William J. Saunderson (incumbent) - 1,356
Edward Hales (incumbent) - 1,292
Zephaniah Hilton - 995
William Worrell - 991
John Coatsworth Graham - 481
Charles Fletcher Leidy - 360
Elgin Schoff - 138

Ward 2 (Cabbagetown and Rosedale)
Tommy Church (incumbent) - 2,656
James Hales (incumbent) - 2,238
Thomas Foster (incumbent)- 1,921
William Norton Eastwood - 1,291
Ewart Farquahar - 864
William Alexander Douglass - 721
John Clark - 445
Josiah Rogers - 199

Ward 3 (Central Business District and The Ward)
Sam McBride (incumbent)- 2,885
John Wilson Bengough (incumbent) - 2,382
Mark Bredin - 2,148
Wesley Sandfield Johnston - 998
Frank W. Johnston - 960
John Kirk - 771
William Earngey - 767
Julius H. Humphrey - 759
Frederick Hogg - 716
David Lorsch - 663
James Phinnemore - 239

Ward 4 (Area between Bathurst Street and University Avenue including Spadina)
R.C. Vaughan (incumbent) - 3,492
George McMurrich (incumbent) - 3,409
Thomas Alexander Lytle (incumbent) - 3,240
George Eakins Gibbard - 2,299

Ward 5 (Trinity-Bellwoods)
Robert Henry Graham (incumbent) - 2,338
Peter Whytock (incumbent) - 2,152
Albert James Keeler (incumbent) - 1,375
James Cooper Claxton - 1,216
Joseph May - 1,029
John Aldridge - 1,008
William Carlyle - 886
Alexander Stewart - 873
Thomas Gillies - 699
Frederick W. Jenkins - 552
William James King - 355

Ward 6 (Brockton and Parkdale)
James Henry McGhie - 2,498
John James Graham - 2,164
J.H. Adams - 1,347
James Arthur McCausland - 1,332
Fred McBrien - 1,017
Walter Mann - 824
Thomas Hurst - 774
John Edward Jarrott - 665
David Ruddick Bell - 594
Thomas Yates Egan - 546
George Fairles - 431
Walter Warrington - 276
Phillips Thompson - 265

Source: and
