= 1893 Toronto municipal election =

Municipal elections were held in Toronto, Canada, on January 2, 1893. Mayor Robert John Fleming, was re-elected to a second term in office, defeating Warring Kennedy.

== Toronto mayor ==
Results
Robert John Fleming (incumbent) - 11,736
Warring Kennedy - 8,618

== Aldermen elected to City Council ==
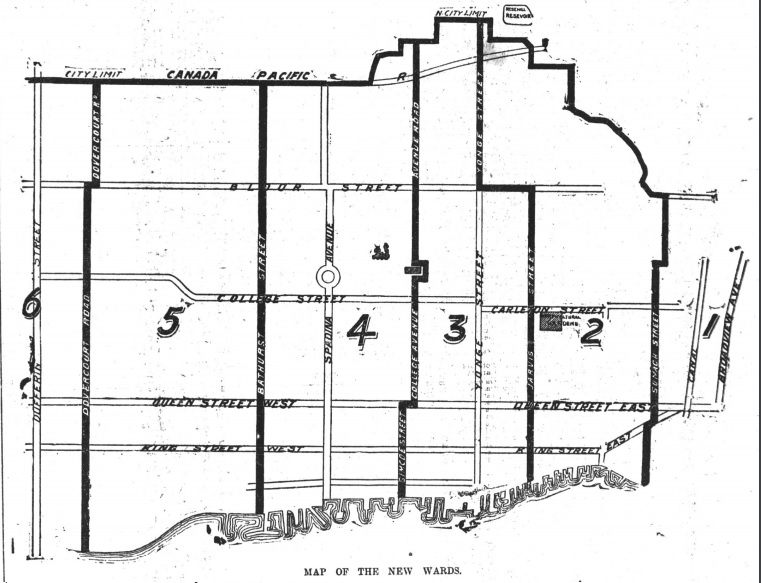
Map of Toronto's six wards (1892-1909), published in The Globe, 1 January 1892.

Four alderman were elected to sit on Toronto City Council in each of six wards.

First Ward
C.C. Small (incumbent) - 1,275
W.T. Stewart (incumbent) - 1,087
Thomas Davies - 1,033
John Knox Leslie (incumbent) - 1,010
G.S. Macdonald (incumbent) - 987
W. Barrett - 697

Second Ward
Daniel Lamb (incumbent) - 2,110
John Hallam (incumbent) - 1,955
Garratt F. Frankland - 1.412
Edward Hewitt - 1,379
David Carlyle (incumbent) - 1,214
Thomas Foster (incumbent) - 1,205
Daniel Kelly - 1,135
George Taunt - 114

Third Ward
Bernard Saunders (incumbent) - 3,094
George McMurrich (incumbent) - 2,535
John Shaw (incumbent) - 2,474
John Brown - 2,405
W.J. Hill - 2,380
Ernest A. Macdonald - 346

Fourth Ward
William Carlyle (incumbent) - 2,292
William Burns (incumbent) - 2,266
James Jolliffe (incumbent) - 1,966
George Verral (incumbent) - 1,634
Wm. P. Hubbard - 1,626
A.F. Jury - 1,316

Fifth Ward
William Bell (incumbent) - 2,252
Thomas Crawford (incumbent) - 2,027
John Bailey (incumbent) - 2,002
J.E. Verral - 1,530
R.H. Graham (incumbent) - 1,409
A. Pearce - 110

Sixth Ward
Dr. J.O. Orr (incumbent) - 1,456
Dr. Adam Lynd - 1,397
John Maloney (incumbent) - 1,096
Thomas Murray - 1,042
W.F. Atkinson (incumbent) - 935
James Gowanlock (incumbent) - 835
John H. Graham - 224
George G. Miles - 120

Source: and
