= 1900 Toronto municipal election =

Municipal elections were held in Toronto, Ontario, Canada, on January 1, 1900. Incumbent Mayor of Toronto John Shaw chose not to stand for a third term. Former Alderman Ernest A. Macdonald was elected mayor after having been unsuccessful on three previous attempts. He defeated Member of Parliament Edward Frederick Clarke, who was also a former mayor, and Second Ward Alderman John Hallam.

== Toronto mayor ==
Results
Ernest A. Macdonald - 11,912
Edward Frederick Clarke, M.P. - 9,229
Alderman John Hallam - 5,181

== Board of Control ==
The Toronto Board of Control was elected by Toronto City Council from among its members. Aldermen Sheppard, Frame and Spence were chosen to sit on the board, which was chaired by the mayor. On April 30th the province passed legislation that, effective immediately, added a fourth Alderman to the Board and removed the mayor's casting vote. On May 8th Alderman James M. Bowman was appointed the new controller.

== Plebiscites ==
Two plebiscites were held, one on the amalgamation of the school boards for elementary schools and high schools and a second authorizing the payment of salaries to the Mayor, Controllers, and Alderman, positions which had been unpaid.

Amalgamation of school boards
For - 11,288
Against - 5,650

Salaries for the Mayor, Controllers, and Aldermen
For - 7,584
Against - 11,220

== Aldermen elected to City Council ==
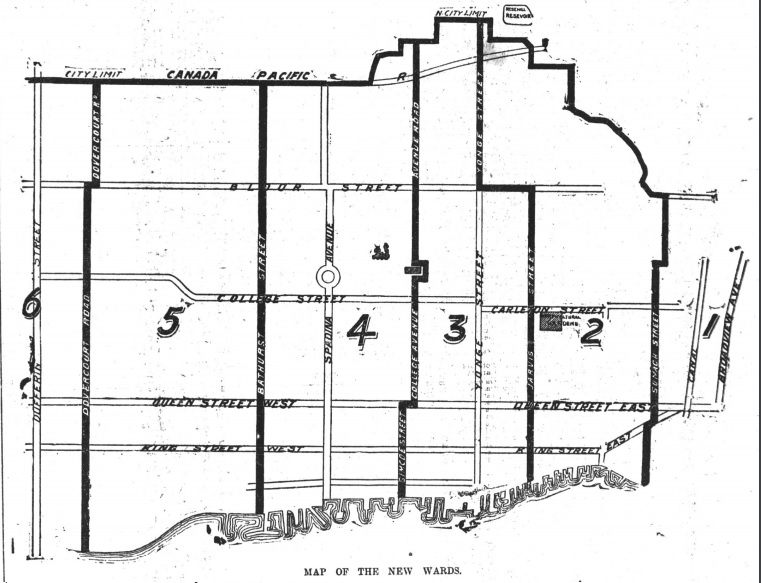
Map of Toronto's six wards (1892-1909), published in The Globe, 1 January 1892.

Four alderman were elected to sit on Toronto City Council in each of six wards. Former Alderman John Leslie filled the vacancy left by the retirement of Alderman Frankland in the First Ward. Aldermen Davies, Score, Hanlan, Graham, and Lynd were all defeated.

First Ward
James Frame (incumbent) - 1,911
Wm. T. Stewart (incumbent) - 1,394
John Knox Leslie - 1,263
John Russell (incumbent)- 1,125
F.A. Richardson - 1,022
Lewis Brown - 782
George Chesman - 232
Charles C. Woodley - 194
E. Rice - 113

Second Ward
Francis Stephen Spence (incumbent) - 2,150
Daniel Lamb (incumbent) - 2,051
Edward Strachan Cox - 1,684
Thomas Foster - 1,581 (after recount)
George Anderson - 1,576 (after recount)
Charles Caldwell - 1,351
Thomas Davies (incumbent) - 1,286
William Thompson - 333

The original count was reported as Anderson 1,571 and Foster 1,524. A recount found that Foster had 11 more votes than Anderson. As a result, Foster was seated as the ward's fourth alderman.

Third Ward
John Francis Loudon - 3,628
Oliver Barton Sheppard (incumbent) - 2,681
George McMurrich - 2,351
Bernard Saunders (incumbent) - 2,139
Richard John Score (incumbent) - 2,003
Herbert S. James - 458

Fourth Ward
Thomas Urquhart - 3,098
Wm. P. Hubbard (incumbent) - 2,674
James Crane (incumbent) - 2,601
Wm. Burns (incumbent) - 2,495
Stephen W. Burns - 2,476
Edward Hanlan (incumbent) - 1,345
Thomas Roberts - 384

Reports initially gave William Burns 2,497 votes and Stephen Burns 2,470 votes. A recount adjusted the figures but affirmed the election of William Burns.

Fifth Ward
William L. Bell - 2,173
John Dunn (incumbent) - 1,831
A.R. Denison (incumbent) - 1,703
Francis H. Woods (incumbent) - 1,611
Dr. William Stewart Fraleigh - 1,600
Robert H. Graham (incumbent) - 1,559
Alex Stewart - 1,117
Henry E. Hamilton - 848
D.T. Hedley - 95
John Sabine - 90

Sixth Ward
Alex Asher - 1,701
John J. Graham (incumbent) - 1,636
James M. Bowman (incumbent) - 1,615
John J. Ward - 1,419
James W. Mallon - 1,370
Dr Adam Lynd (incumbent) - 1,191
Hugh MacMath - 707
A.F. Hatch - 83

Source: and
