= Jesse O. McCarthy =

Canadian politician (1867–1937)

Jesse O. McCarthy (November 10, 1867 — 1937) was a Toronto insurance executive and politician and an early member of Canada's Baháʼí Faith community.

McCarthy was born in Walpole, Haldimand County, Ontario to Charles Callahan McCarthy and Margaret Frances (Williams) McCarthy. He was a school teacher before becoming a life insurance agent in 1892. He worked for the Temperance and General Life Assurance Company of Toronto until 1905 and then was the provincial manager of first the Great West Life Assurance Company of Toronto from 1906 to 1909 and then manager of Aetna Life Assurance Company until 1912 when he became president of the Sterling Life Assurance Company and then president and general manager of its successor, the Security Life Insurance Company of Canada.

McCarthy was first elected to Toronto City Council as alderman for Ward 6 in the 1910 Toronto municipal election and was re-elected in 1911 Toronto municipal election. In the 1912 Toronto municipal election he was elected to the Toronto Board of Control and was re-elected in 1913 and 1914 and is credited with establishing Toronto's juvenile court, the first in Canada, and advocated on improvements to sanitation, food safety, the water and milk supply, lighting, and education. McCarthy ran for Mayor of Toronto in the 1915 Toronto municipal election but was defeated by Thomas Langton Church who won 26,041 votes to McCarthy's 19,573. McCarthy had been endorsed by the Toronto Daily Star which praised his record as a social reformer crediting him with leading the playground movement in the city as well as using his position on council to improve water treatment and sanitation to reduce the spread of disease, and built improved hospitals.

Originally a Methodist, McCarthy and his wife became members of the small Baháʼí community in Toronto. In 1924, McCarthy was sent to Britain to represent Toronto's Baháʼí community at an international Baháʼí conference.

He married Mary Davis on August 10, 1892, and they had three children: Lilian Pearl, Vourneen, and Davis. McCarthy died in 1937.
