= Alexander W. Galbraith =

Canadian photographer (1867–1950)

- Born: March 1867; Canada
- Died: 1950 (aged 82–83); Canada
- Occupation: photographer
- Known for: recording iconic images of Canada

Alexander W. Galbraith (1867–1950) was a Canadian photographer, known for recording iconic images from Canada's past.

A 1950 profile of Galbraith, in The Globe and Mail, reported "In all, he has taken 50,000 pictures. Many have high historic interest, since they give a clear picture of the early life of Toronto."

In a 2001 profile on Galbraith's legacy in the Globe, John Saunders wrote that most of the 50,000 images he captured during his long career were recorded on glass photographic plates. Saunders wrote that many of his valuable images were lost when other photographers washed his images away in order to recycle the plates. Saunders wrote that Galbraith sold most of his remaining images to the Globe, late in his life, because he ran out of storage space.

An image Galbraith captured, of Bay Street, in 1903, is frequently used as a "before" image, in coverage of Toronto's Great Fire of 1904, as it captured the western boundary of the fire.

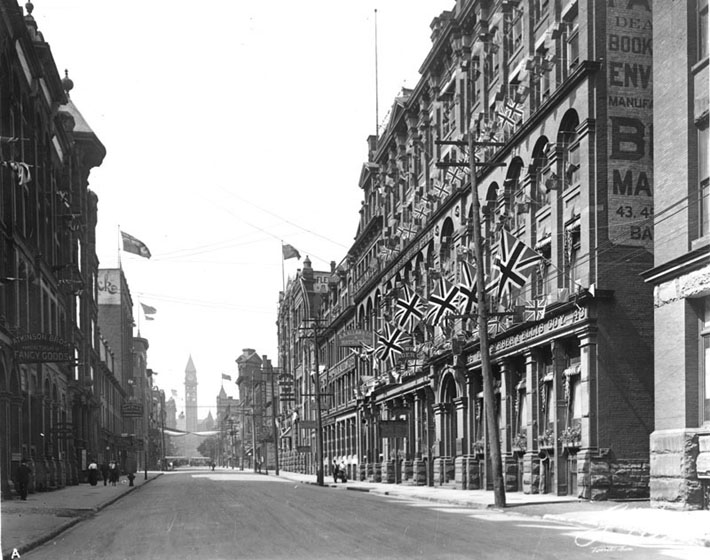

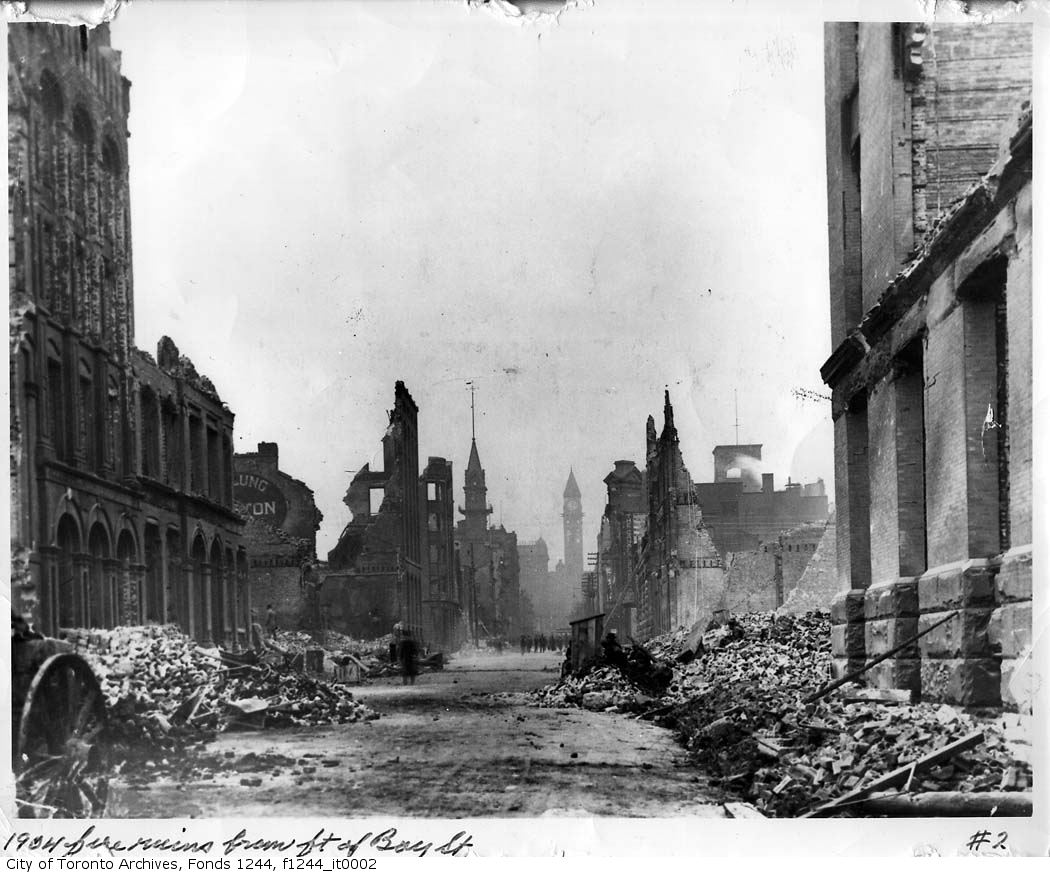

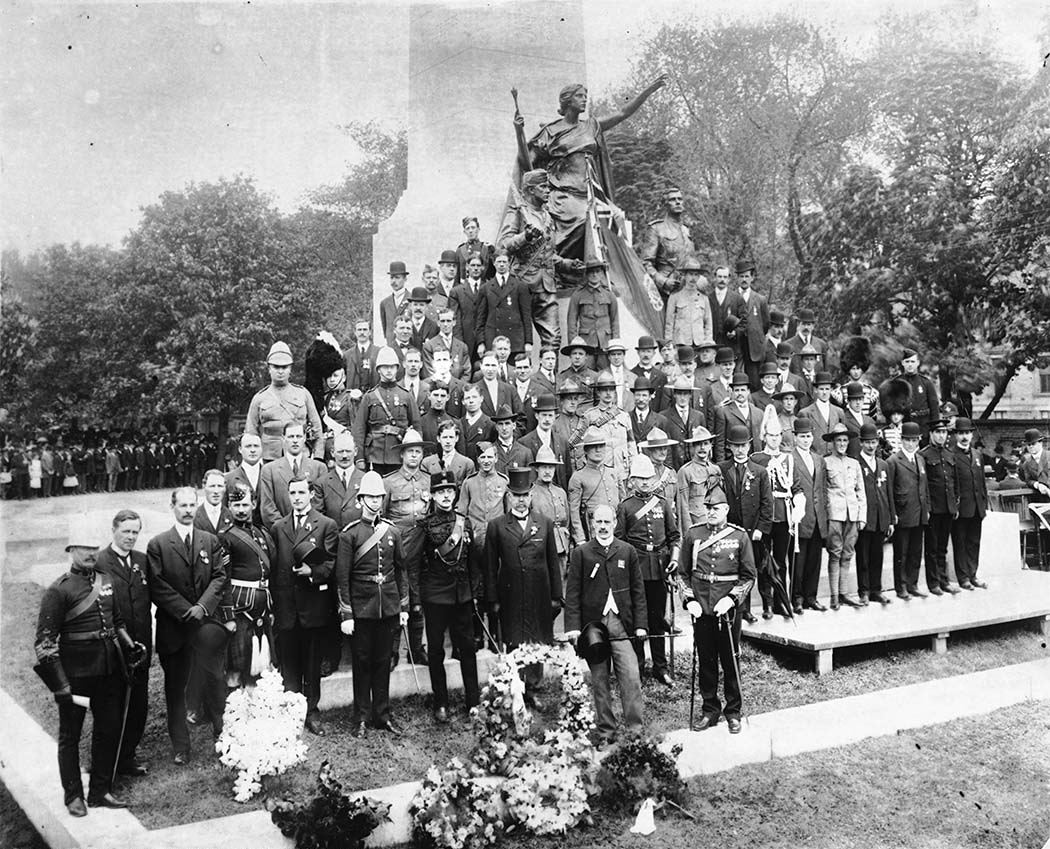
