= J. Enoch Thompson =

Chevalier John Enoch Thompson (1846 – November 29, 1932) was a prominent citizen of Toronto. He was a politician, diplomat, writer, and businessman.

== Biography ==
He was born in Durham, England in 1846 and moved to Toronto in 1870 with his six other brothers. His brother was Ernest Thompson Seton (who changed his surname to commemorate his ancestors the Earls of Winton) was a prominent naturalist and one of the best famous Canadian writers of the period.

Thompson's primary occupation was in real estate, and he was a prominent developer. He organized the first scheme in Toronto that allowed people to buy property on credit. He was elected to city council in the 1890s, serving one term. He was a long time campaigner against the strict restrictions on Sunday activities that were being imposed in Toronto at the time, such as a ban on tobogganing in city parks on a Sunday. He was also an early advocate for the creation of the St. Lawrence Seaway. In the 1908 Toronto municipal election he ran for a position on the Toronto Board of Control, but finished with few votes.

His most prominent role was serving as a consul in Toronto for a series of countries, Liberia, the Kingdom of Hawaii, Cuba, and finally Spain. He was a Knight Commander of the Liberian Humane Order of African Redemption and a Chevalier of the Spanish Order of Charles III. One of his trips to Spain resulted in the travelogue Seven Weeks in Sunny Spain.

Thompson is also responsible for the Whirlpool Aero Car that continues to run at Niagara Falls. He developed it as a tourist venture, and recruited Spanish engineer Leonardo Torres Quevedo to design it.

Among his children were etiquette writer Gertrude Pringle.
