= Great Fire of Toronto (1904) =

Huge destructive fire

Coordinates: 43.647°N 79.381°W

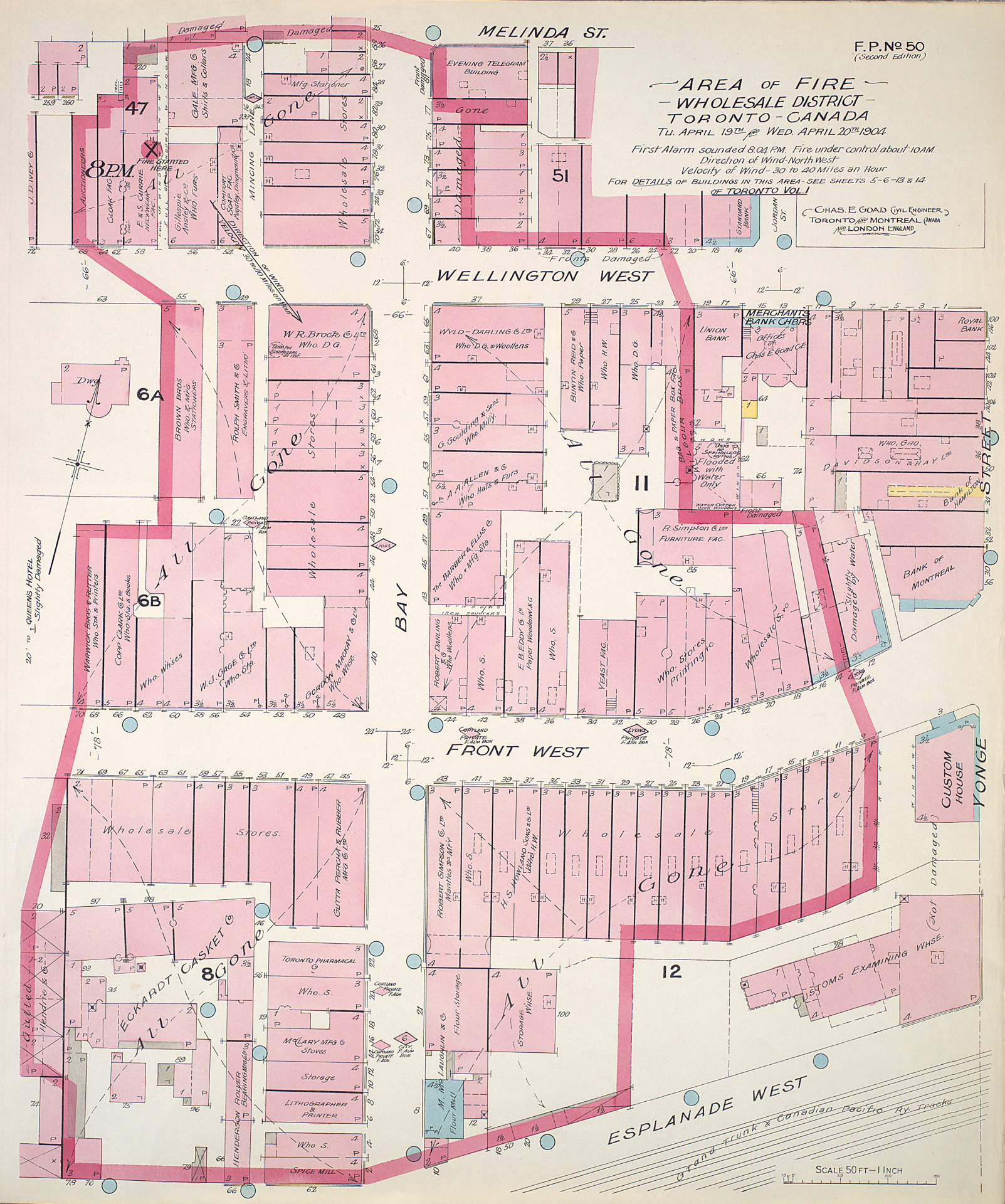
Fire insurance map depicting the area damaged by the fire.

The Great Fire of Toronto of 1904 destroyed a large section of Downtown Toronto, Ontario, Canada on April 19, 1904. It was the second such fire for the city in its history. It destroyed more than a hundred buildings and killed one person.

== Incident ==
The fire was first spotted at 8:04 p.m., on April 19, 1904, by a Toronto Police constable on his regular street patrol. The flames were rising from the elevator shaft of the E & S Currie Limited's neck wear factory at 58 Wellington Street West, just west of Bay Street (now TD Bank Tower). The factory was situated in the centre of a large industrial and commercial area. The exact cause of the fire was never determined, but a faulty heating stove or an electrical problem is suspected.

With 17 fire halls alerted, two engine companies and one hose company, the fire took nine hours to get under control. The glow of the fire could be seen for miles in all directions. Firefighters from cities as far away as Buffalo, New York, came to Toronto's aid at the request of the then mayor Thomas Urquhart. The temperature that night was approximately −4 °C (25 °F) with winds at 48 kilometres per hour (30 mph) and snow flurries.

Over 100 buildings would be destroyed in the fire; one estimate reported 114 buildings. Damage on Wellington Street West and Yonge Street was limited because one of the buildings, the Kilgour Brothers factory, had a sprinkler system fed by water tanks on the roof, preventing the fire from spreading in that direction.

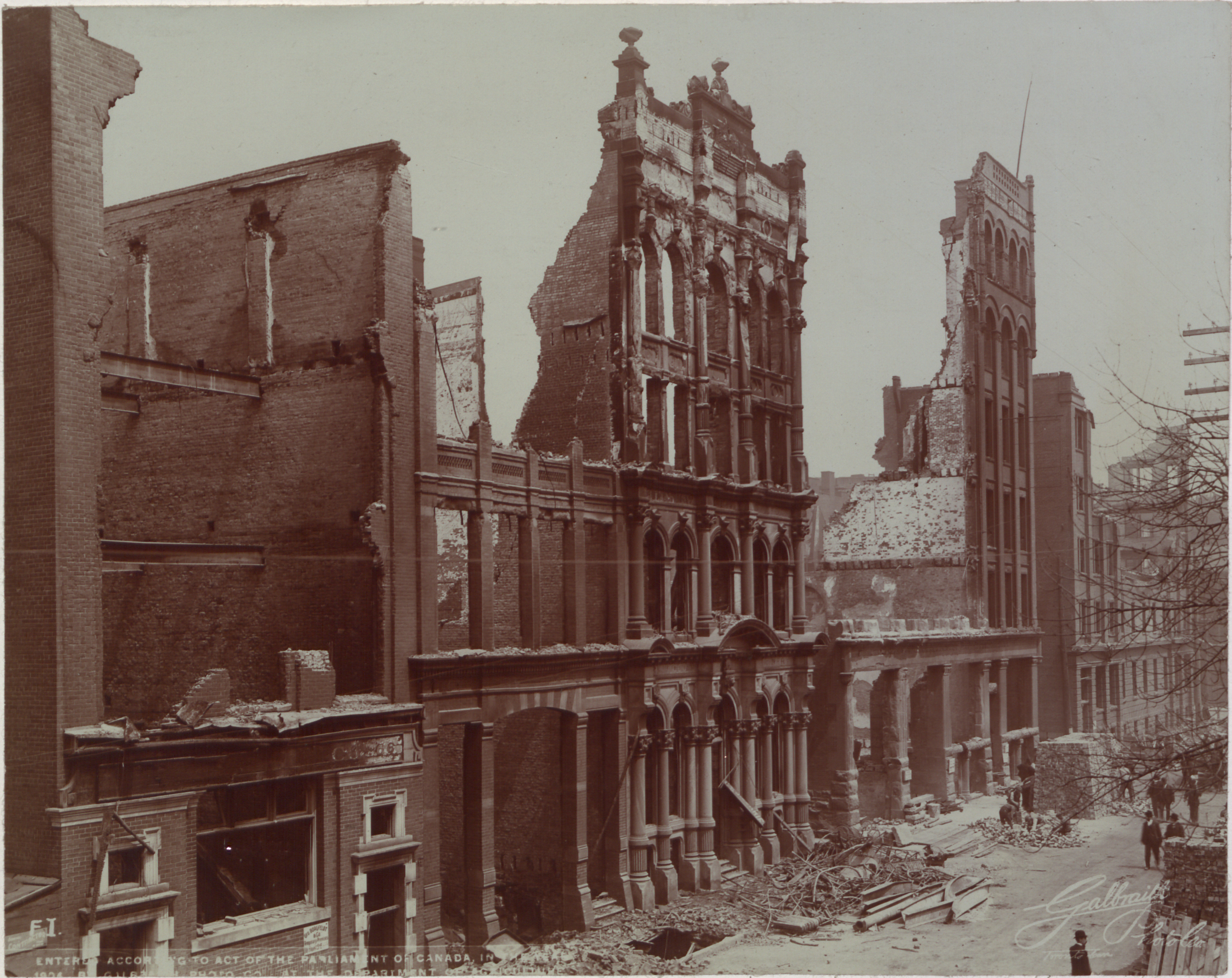
Where the Toronto Fire started

The fire claimed one victim, John Croft, who was an explosive expert clearing the ruins from the fire. It caused CA$10,387,000 ($390 million in 2025 dollars) in damage and put five thousand people out of work; at the time the city had 200,000 inhabitants. As a result of the fire, more stringent safety laws were introduced and an expansion of the city's fire department was undertaken.

A few buildings nearby survived including the Bank of Montreal building at Yonge and Front Streets, Customs House and their warehouse (demolished in 1919), Toronto Evening Telegram Building. Although the fire was officially under control by 4:30 a.m. the following morning, small fires sporadically broke out for the next few days and the remains from the fire smouldered for 2 weeks.

== Legacy ==
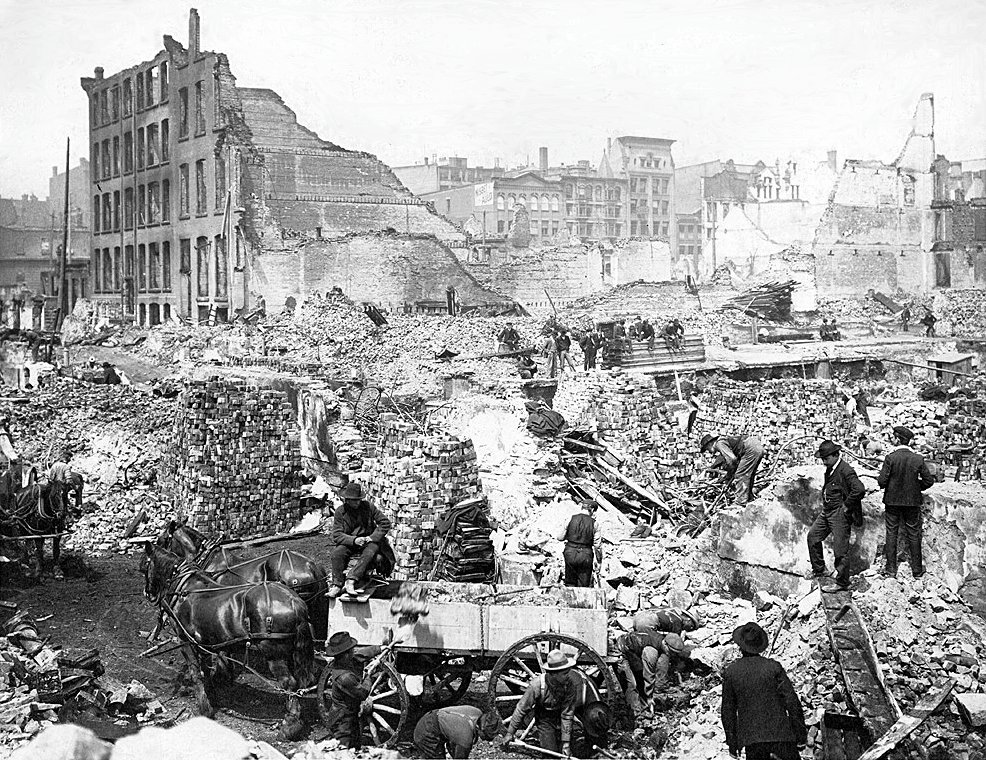
Surveying the damage on Front Street after the fire.

The fire remains the largest fire ever to have occurred in Toronto. A previous great fire on April 7, 1849, in the St. Lawrence Market area, consumed several city blocks when the city was much smaller and many more structures were wooden.

Call Box 12, which was used to sound the alarm, is the name for the volunteer canteen truck supporting Toronto Fire Services today.

Toronto Fire Services Public Education Centre and Museum at Station 233 has a model displaying the area of the fire.

A 1904 film, The Great Fire of Toronto, created by George Scott & Co. about the event, was the first to be shot in Toronto.

A fictionalized account of the Fire was central to the Murdoch Mysteries episode, "Great Balls of Fire".

Part of the area cleared by the fire became the site of Union Station, built during the following decade.

== See also ==
- Great Fire of Toronto (1849)
- List of historic fires
- Toronto Fire Services

== Bibliography ==
- Lasiuk, Jon; Friebe, Marla (2003). A History of the Toronto Fire Services 1874-2002. Toronto: Toronto Fire Department. ISBN 978-0-9737066-0-4.
