= George Reginald Geary =

Canadian politician

The Honourable George Geary PC OBE MC QC
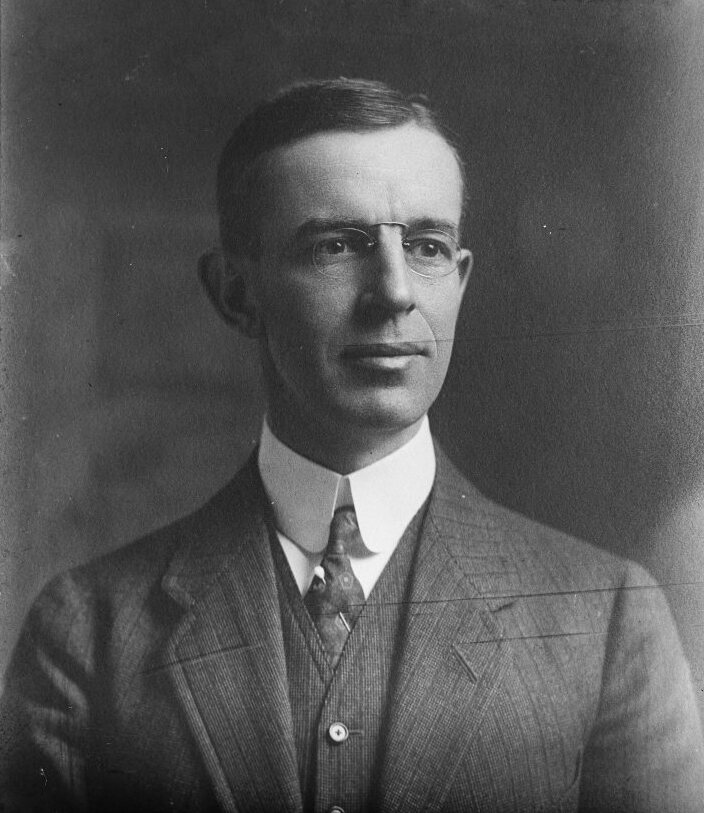
- Geary, c. 1925

Minister of Justice Attorney General of Canada
- In office August 14, 1935 – October 22, 1935
- Prime Minister: R. B. Bennett
- Preceded by: Hugh Guthrie
- Succeeded by: Ernest Lapointe

Member of Parliament for Toronto South
- In office October 29, 1925 – October 13, 1935
- Preceded by: Charles Sheard
- Succeeded by: Riding abolished

35th Mayor of Toronto
- In office 1910–1912
- Preceded by: Joseph Oliver
- Succeeded by: Horatio Hocken

Personal details
- Born: George Reginald Geary; August 12, 1872 Strathroy, Ontario, Canada
- Died: April 30, 1954 (aged 81) Toronto, Ontario, Canada
- Party: Conservative
- Profession: Barrister; counsel

George Reginald Geary PC KC MC OBE (August 12, 1872 – April 30, 1954) was a Canadian politician. He was a Conservative member of the House of Commons from 1925 to 1935. He also served as Mayor of Toronto from 1910 to 1912.

== Background ==
Born August 12, 1872, in Strathroy, Ontario, the Geary family moved to Sarnia, Ontario, when Geary was age one. He attended and graduated from Toronto's Upper Canada College. He graduated from the University of Toronto law school in 1896 where he was a Member of Alpha Delta Phi. Geary enlisted in the Canadian Expeditionary Force on January 7, 1915. He served in World War I and was awarded the Military Cross and the French Legion of Honour. Geary was also awarded the Military Cross and Croix de Guerre during World War I. On March 24, 1919, he was discharged. He was also a member of the Orange Order in Canada.

== Municipal politics ==
Soon after graduation he became interested in politics. In 1904 he became a school trustee in Ward 4. Then an alderman from 1905 to 1907. From there he became counsel for the Ontario government. Then in 1908 he ran for mayor and lost to Joseph Oliver. Geary was elected mayor in 1910, re-elected in 1911 and acclaimed in 1912. He resigned in October 1912 in order to accept a position as the City of Toronto's legal counsel.

During his term in office he announced plans for a new Harbor board. Geary said, "We have a magnificent harbor but we have failed miserably to avail ourselves of nature's generosity. We have barely sufficient wharfage to accommodate the lake traffic today, to say nothing of the future. We have been to neglectful of our shipping and harbor interests."

== Federal politics ==
In 1925 he was elected as a member of parliament as a Conservative from the riding Toronto South and remained an MP until 1935. In 1935 he briefly served as the Minister of Justice in the Cabinet of R.B. Bennett and accordingly became a member of the Queen's Privy Council for Canada. He and the Bennett government were defeated in the 1935 federal election. Geary attempted to regain a seat in the 1940 federal election but was defeated by Arthur Roebuck.

== Legacy ==
He died in Toronto on April 30, 1954, aged 80. He was buried in the St. James Cemetery. In 1990, his former residence was declared a historic site by the province, naming the home "Geary House".

In 1912 Geary was the namesake for a tugboat, built for the city of Toronto, named the G. R. Geary.
