= Joseph Oliver (politician) =

Canadian politician, mayor of Toronto (1852–1922)

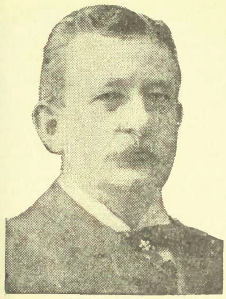

34th Mayor of Toronto
- In office 1908–1909
- Preceded by: Emerson Coatsworth
- Succeeded by: George Geary

Personal details
- Born: 1852 Erin, Ontario
- Died: January 8, 1922 (aged 69–70) Toronto, Ontario
- Occupation: Businessman, Owner of Oliver Lumber Company

Joseph Oliver (1852 – January 8, 1922) was Mayor of Toronto from 1908 to 1909.

Born in Erin, Ontario, Oliver lived in Toronto since he was three years old. He worked in the lumber business. He was elected to the School Board in 1885 and to the Toronto City Council in 1895, 1901, 1902, 1903 (also Toronto Board of Control) and 1906. He was elected mayor in 1908 and 1909. He was President of the Canadian National Exhibition Association in 1914 and 1915. He was also the Grand Sire of the Sovereign Grand Lodge of the Independent Order of Oddfellows of America from 1920 to the date of his death having been with the organization for almost 50 years. He was the last Liberal to be elected mayor in Toronto before Allan A. Lamport in 1951. He was also a member of the Orange Order in Canada.
