= John Shaw (Canadian politician) =

Canadian politician

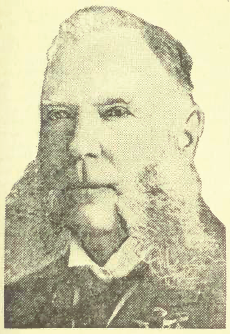

29th Mayor of Toronto
- In office August 6, 1897 – January 1, 1900
- Preceded by: Robert J. Fleming
- Succeeded by: Ernest A. Macdonald

Member of the Legislative Assembly of Ontario for Toronto North -- Seat B
- In office 1908–1911

Personal details
- Born: 1837 Toronto, Upper Canada
- Died: November 7, 1917 (aged 79–80) Toronto, Ontario

John Shaw (1837 – November 7, 1917) was Mayor of Toronto from August 6, 1897, to January 1, 1899.

A lawyer and politician, Shaw was an alderman on Toronto City Council from 1883 until 1895. He ran for mayor in the 1896 Toronto municipal election but was defeated by the incumbent Robert J. Fleming. As alderman again in 1897, he was elected mayor by council, after Mayor Fleming resigned in August 1897.

During the summer of 1898, the new City Hall on Queen Street was completed and occupied. Ten years earlier construction had started on the city hall designed by Toronto architect E. J. Lennox. Mayor Shaw and his wife were part of the opening ceremonies and were lifted to the top of the clock tower in a wooden workman's lift.

Mayor Shaw believed that the northland's development was very important to Toronto. He presided over the Toronto and Hudson's Bay Railway Commission. The commission was to determine the feasibility of building a railway from Toronto to Hudson Bay. Although the project had many supporters, the line was never built. He was also a member of the Orange Order in Canada.

John Shaw left politics for a time after his mayoral term. He ran for alderman in the 1903 Toronto municipal election but was defeated. He ran for a spot on the Toronto Board of Control in the 1904 Toronto municipal election, the first the body was directly elected, but was again defeated. However, he won a by-election to the Board of Control several months later and was re-elected in 1905 and 1906. In 1908, he was elected to the provincial legislature as the Conservative MLA for Toronto North Seat B then retired from politics in 1911.
