= Thomas Urquhart (Canadian politician) =

Canadian politician (1858–1931)

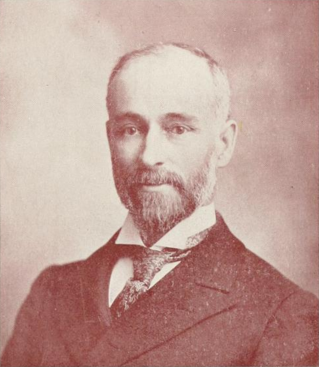

32nd Mayor of Toronto
- In office 1903–1905
- Preceded by: Oliver Howland
- Succeeded by: Emerson Coatsworth

Toronto Ward 4 Alderman
- In office 1900-1903

Personal details
- Born: April 16, 1858 Wallacetown, Dunwich Township, Elgin County, Canada West
- Died: February 16, 1931 (aged 72) Toronto, Ontario
- Resting place: Mount Pleasant Cemetery, Toronto
- Party: Liberal
- Education: Osgoode Hall Law School
- Profession: Barrister and solicitor

Thomas Urquhart (April 16, 1858 – February 16, 1931) was a Canadian politician who served as mayor of Toronto from 1903 to 1905.

== Early life ==
Urquhart was born in Wallacetown, Dunwich Township, Elgin County, Canada West. His parents were Sarah McCallum and Alexander Cameron Urquhart, a pioneer tailor and storekeeper who immigrated from Dingwall, Ross and Cromarty, Scotland to Canada in 1847.

He attended public school in Wallacetown until he was 13 years old. He then spent years working with his father. At 21, he was appointed municipal clerk of the Township of Dunwich. Later, he became secretary of the Agricultural Society of West Elgin and secretary of the West Elgin Reform Association.

He decided to enter law, and after passing the matriculation examination in 1881, he entered a law office in St. Thomas. In 1882 he entered a second law as a student. In 1886, he graduated from Osgoode Hall Law School as barrister and solicitor.

== Career ==
Urquhart entered into different law partnerships over the next many years. One partnership was with his brother Daniel Urquhart.

He took a strong role in civic affairs, and was elected alderman in Toronto’s Ward 4 in 1900 and re-elected in 1901-1902, prior to being elected to the mayor’s chair for three successive years. Thomas was elected mayor in 1903 over Oliver Howland and Daniel Lamb. In 1904 he was re-elected by acclamation, and in 1905 he defeated George Horace Gooderham.

While he was mayor, he always guarded against encroachments of corporations to destroy the city’s sovereignty over its own streets. During that time, electric railway (streetcar) companies applied many times for franchises (operating monopolies) in adjoining municipalities, and it was feared the Toronto Street Railway Co. would acquire a perpetual franchise in Toronto. As mayor, he kept Toronto free of such entanglements.

He attended the first meeting in Berlin (now Kitchener) regarding the proposals to establish the hydroelectric system, and he also advocated public ownership of telephones. The Great Toronto fire of 1904 occurred during his time as mayor.

A strong Liberal, he was chosen by his party to contest the district of West Toronto for the legislature against Hon. Thomas Crawford. In 1904, he contested the riding of Toronto North for Parliament against Sir George Foster. In 1906, he ran unsuccessfully for the Ontario legislature against W. K. McNaught in Toronto North in a provincial byelection.

== Personal life ==
Urquhart was a leader in the Toronto Baptist community, active in both the Walmer Road Baptist Church and the Aurora Baptist Church. He was also a member of the Orange Order in Canada.

He was first married to Margaret S. McDonald of Peterborough, Ontario, who died in 1925. He married Mary Ellen Hall in 1927.

After becoming ill at his office, Urquhart was taken to his home at 136 Hillsdale Avenue in Toronto, where he died on February 16, 1931, from influenza. He was buried in Mount Pleasant Cemetery on February 18.
