= Francis Spence =

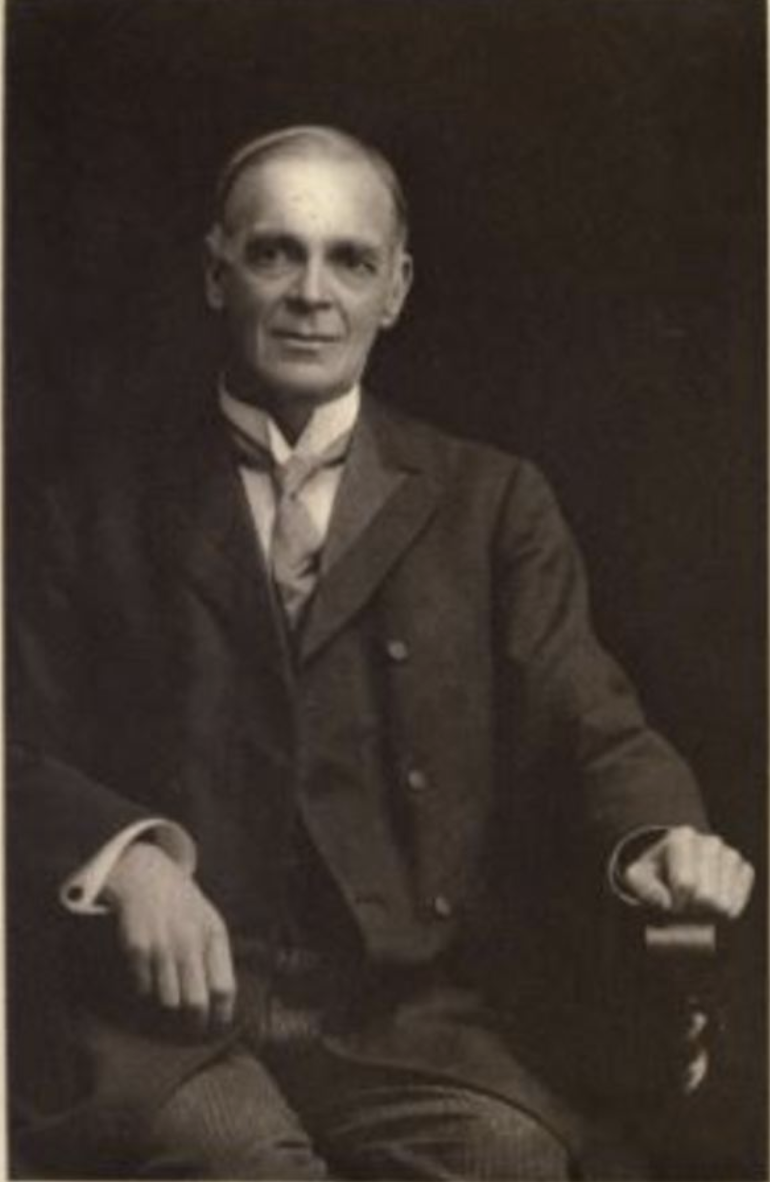
Photo in Prohibition in Canada: A Memorial to Francis Stephens Spence (1919)

Francis Stephens Spence (March 29, 1850 — March 8, 1917) was an Irish-Canadian politician, prohibitionist, teacher, and journalist.

Spence was born in County Donegal, Ireland, one of 12 children. His family emigrated to Canada West in 1861 where his father, Jacob Spence, became involved with the temperance movement, becoming secretary of the Ontario Temperance and Prohibitory League and giving speeches throughout the province. Francis and his siblings became involved in the movement as children, helping their father write and print pamphlets.

Francis Spence was trained to be a teacher at the Toronto Normal School and taught in Niagara and Prescott before returning to Toronto to become a headmaster. He left teaching in 1883 to become publisher of the Canada Citizen and Temperance Herald and then manager of the Citizen Publishing Company of Toronto Limited. He edited several pro-temperance journals and founded Pioneer which became the official publication of the temperance movement in Ontario in 1904. He was secretary and the sole employee of the Dominion Alliance for the Total Suppression of the Liquor Traffic until 1907 when he had to step down due to having lost credibility with the radical Advanced Prohibitions of the Dominion Alliance when he supported Oliver Mowat's government in Ontario, and Mowat avoided passing a prohibition law on constitutional grounds.

Spence became active in the Liberal Party and campaigned for municipal office. He served as school trustee from 1887 to 1888. He campaigned unsuccessfully for an aldermanic seat on Toronto City Council in 1894 on a platform opposing the operation of streetcars on Sundays. He would be elected to city council subsequently, serving in as an alderman in 1896–97, 1899–1900, 1902–5, and 1914 and on the Toronto Board of Control in 1904–5, 1908, 1910–11, and 1915, also serving as deputy mayor in 1911.

He helped create the Toronto Harbour Commission and served on its board from 1911 to 1914.

Spence ran for mayor in the 1901 Toronto municipal election and the 1906 Toronto municipal election, promising to reduce the number of liquor licenses in the city, a platform which contributed to his defeat on both occasions.

== Legacy ==
Spence's daughter Ruth Elizabeth Spence published a book of remembrance, Prohibition in Canada: A Memorial to Francis Stephens Spence, in 1919.
