= George McMurrich =

19th-century member of Toronto City Council

George McMurrich (October 29, 1844 - September 7, 1913) was a long-time member of Toronto City Council in the late 19th and early 20th centuries.

He was a senior member of George McMurrich & Sons, insurance agents, and at various times, a member of the Toronto School Board, the Toronto City Council and the Toronto Board of Trade.

== Biography ==
McMurrich, who in his business life ran an insurance firm, was first elected an alderman for St. George's Ward in 1891, represented Ward Three from 1892 to 1903 except for 1897 and 1899 when he was not on council. After a break of three years, he was elected to represent Ward Four and did so continuously until his death in 1913. He ran for mayor twice, in the 1897 Toronto municipal election in which he lost to incumbent mayor Robert Fleming by 1,600 votes and in 1899 Toronto municipal election when he came in third. In the 1897 election he campaigned in favour of allowing streetcar service on Sundays. He was appointed by council to sit on the Toronto Board of Control in 1896 and again in 1902 for one-year terms.

McMurrich was the second son of John McMurrich, a former Ontario Liberal Party member of the Ontario legislature, and Janet Dickson. His older brother was William Barclay McMurrich, who served as Mayor of Toronto from 1881 to 1882. George McMurrich, himself, was a supporter of the Ontario Liberal Party but never stood for the party provincially or federally.
