= Thomas Langton Church =

Canadian politician (1873–1950)

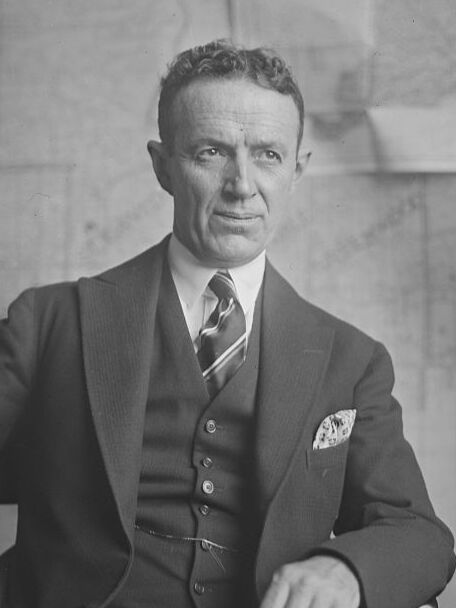
- Church, c. 1925

Member of the Canadian Parliament for Toronto North
- In office 1921–1925
- Preceded by: George Eulas Foster
- Succeeded by: Electoral district abolished

Member of the Canadian Parliament for Toronto Northwest
- In office 1925–1930
- Preceded by: Electoral district created
- Succeeded by: John Ritchie MacNicol

Member of the Canadian Parliament for Toronto East
- In office 1934–1935
- Preceded by: Edmond Baird Ryckman
- Succeeded by: Electoral district abolished

Member of the Canadian Parliament for Broadview
- In office 1935–1950
- Preceded by: Electoral district created
- Succeeded by: George Harris Hees

37th Mayor of Toronto
- In office 1915–1921
- Preceded by: Horatio Clarence Hocken
- Succeeded by: Charles A. Maguire

Personal details
- Born: 1873 Toronto, Ontario
- Died: February 7, 1950 (aged 79–80)
- Party: Conservative
- Relations: Rebecca M. Church (sister)

Thomas Langton Church (1873 – February 7, 1950) was a Canadian politician.

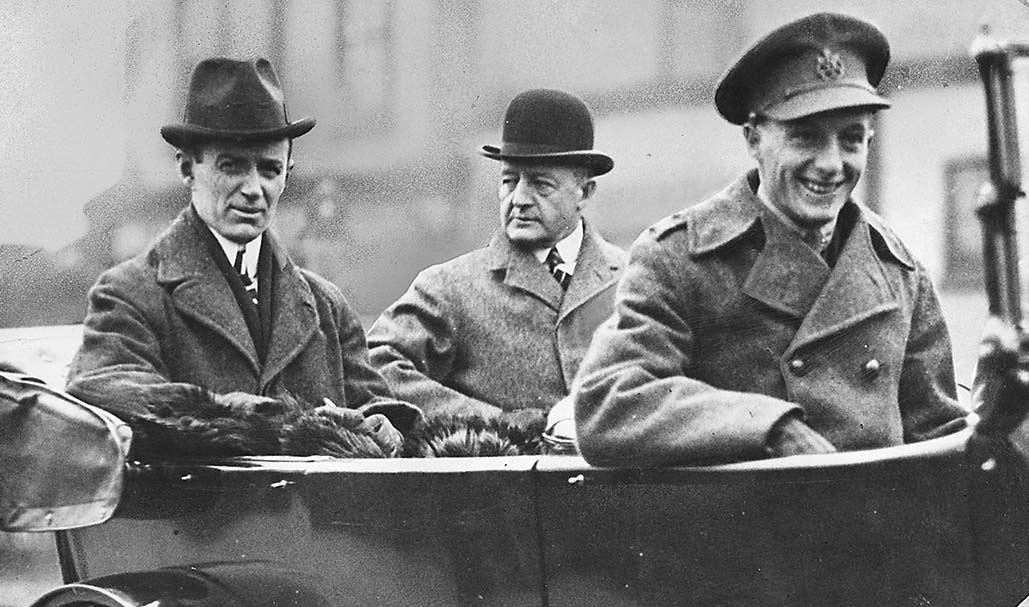
Mayor Thomas Langton Church (left) and Sir Adam Beck

After serving as Mayor of Toronto from 1915 to 1921, he was elected to the House of Commons of Canada in the 1921 election as a Conservative from the riding of Toronto North. He was defeated in the 1930 election in Toronto West Centre, but returned to Parliament as Member of Parliament (MP) for Toronto East in a 1934 by-election. He remained in the House of Commons until his death in 1950.

As mayor, Church was strongly backed by the Toronto Telegram and opposed by the Toronto Daily Star. He was occasionally mocked in the pages of the Star by Ernest Hemingway who was, at the time, a reporter for the paper. Late in his career as an MP, Church denounced the newly formed United Nations as "modern tower of Babel", for "which Canada and Great Britain should not allow their interests to be the play thing."

In the House of Commons in June 1936, he protested against the requirement of bilingual banknotes in the Bank of Canada Act for banknotes to be introduced as the 1937 Series, stating there was no authority for it in the British North America Act, and that it had not been an issue during the 1935 federal election. He favoured printing dual-language banknotes (distinct English and French banknotes) as had been done for the 1935 Series. He was also a member of the Orange Order in Canada.
