= Thomas Foster (Canadian politician) =

Canadian politician

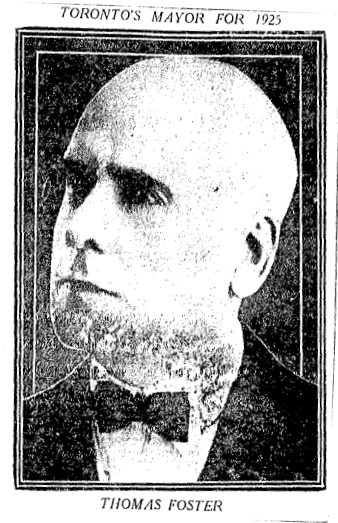

40th Mayor of Toronto
- In office 1925–1927
- Preceded by: William W. Hiltz
- Succeeded by: Samuel McBride

Member of Parliament for York East
- In office 1917–1921
- Preceded by: Riding reestablished (2nd time)
- Succeeded by: Joseph Henry Harris

Personal details
- Born: 24 July 1852 York Township, Canada West
- Died: 10 December 1945 (aged 93)
- Occupation: Businessman

Thomas Foster (24 July 1852 – 10 December 1945) was a Canadian businessman and politician who served as Mayor of Toronto from 1925 to 1927.

== Early life ==
The son of John T. Foster and Frances Nicholson, Thomas Foster was born 24 July 1852, in Lambton Mills, Canada West. His family soon moved to Leaskdale, Canada West after his mother's death.

He started his working life as a butcher's boy in Toronto, until he saved enough money to purchase his own butcher shop for $50. The earnings from that business allowed him to purchase property, which became the source of his eventual wealth.

== Political career ==
He was first elected as an alderman for St. David Ward in 1891, then reelected in 1892 and 1894. In 1895 he lost the election, and did not return to council until 1900 as an alderman for Ward 2, a position which he held until 1909. He was elected to the Toronto Board of Control in 1910; however, he lost the 1911 election. In 1912 he was again elected Controller and kept his seat until 1917.

Foster served as a Member of House of Commons of Canada from 1917 to 1921. He was elected as a Union Government candidate in the 1917 federal election for East York. He lost in his party's nomination so he ran as an independent in Toronto East in the 1921 election but failed to keep his seat.

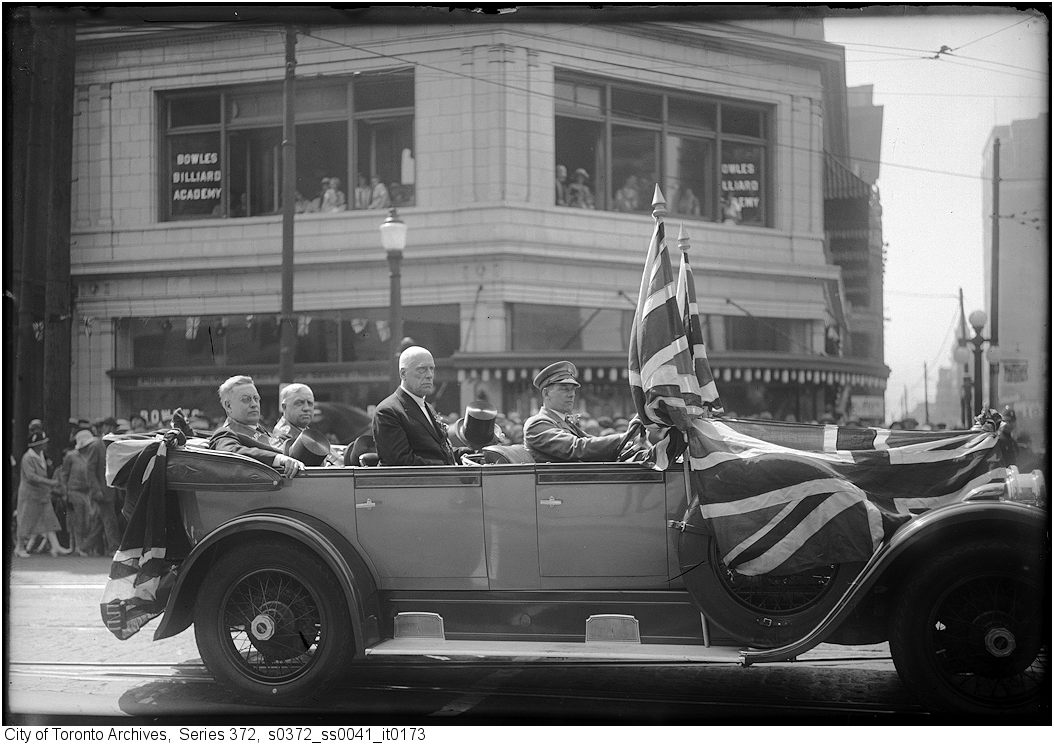
Mayor Foster during a parade, 1927

Foster returned to City Council for the next three years, then was elected as mayor in 1925. He was a great supporter of Hydro expenditures and loved flowers. As an alderman, he fought for the rebuilding of the pavilion at Allan Gardens after it had been destroyed by fire. In his 25 years of civic service, he earned the informal title of "Honest Tom". As mayor of Toronto he was reported to have saved the city two million dollars by rigid economics.

Foster was known to collect the rents on his properties in person, even when he was mayor. If a tenant complained about a problem, or wanted a bit of work done, Foster would go out to his car, get his tools and fix the issue on the spot. His penny pinching eventually led to his defeat due to his refusal to raise police salaries.

== Later years and legacy ==
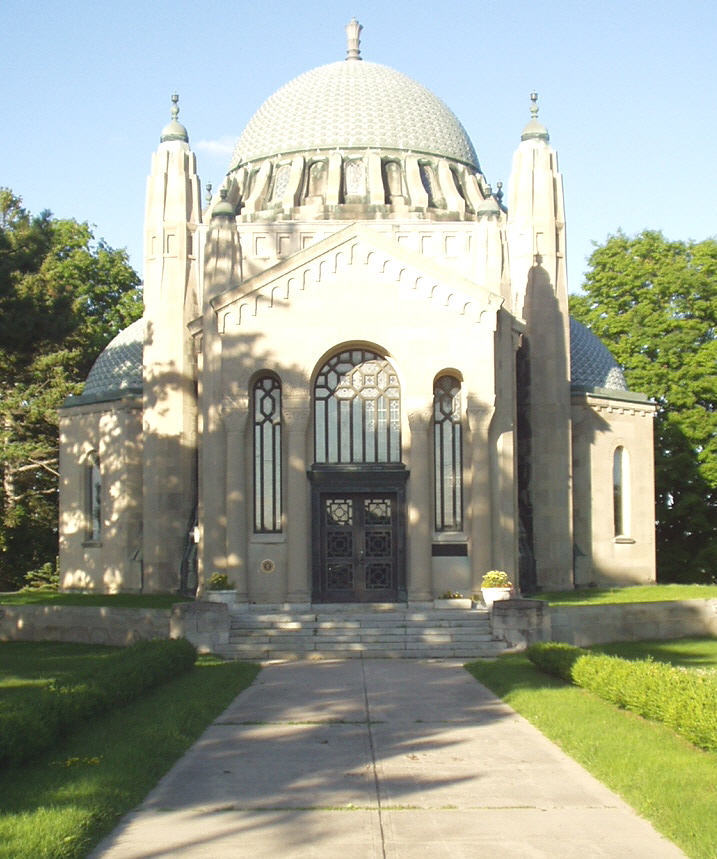
Thomas Foster Memorial Temple

He was a great traveler and on one of his trips he was inspired by the Taj Mahal. In 1935 and 1936, he had a memorial temple constructed on a hill between Leaskdale and Uxbridge, Ontario, for his family at a cost of $200,000. The temple was designed by Foster with architects H.H. Madill and James H. Craig and inspired by Mughal architecture and Byzantine architecture. The Murdoch Mysteries episode "Murdoch and the Temple of Death" uses the temple, and also references the Hagia Sophia.

He died at the age of 93 and is buried in the massive mausoleum on a hill north of town on Durham Regional Road 1 which includes the remains of Foster, his wife and daughter. Foster left $80,000 in funds to maintain the property in perpetuity but the trustees spent the principal and the funds had dried up by the 1990s, leaving the Town of Uxbridge to take over responsibility for the monument. In 2013, it was estimated that $1 million was needed to repair and restore the building, a controversial task given that the entire budget for the municipality was only $14 million.

Among other things, Foster left $500,000 for cancer research, $100,000 for an annual picnic to be held at Exhibition Park for school children, and funds to feed wild birds in Toronto. Inspired by the Great Stork Derby, Mayor Foster also sponsored a contest to reward mothers for their skills at procreation. The prizes were $1,250 for first, $800 for second, and $450 for third. Four ten-years periods began and ended on his death date, and ran from 1945–55, 1948–58, 1951–61, and 1954-64.

A bronze portrait medallion of Thomas Foster by Christian Corbet was publicly unveiled in 2009 and is permanently housed in the memorial.

He was also a member of the Orange Order in Canada.

== Electoral record ==
=== Municipal ===
- Alderman for St. David's Ward (1891–1892, 1894)
- Alderman for Ward 2 (1900–1909)
- Toronto Board of Control (1910, 1912–1913, 1915–1917, 1922–1924)
- Mayor of Toronto (1925-1927)

=== Federal ===
1917 Canadian federal election: York East
Party	Candidate	Votes
Government	Thomas Foster	9,736
Opposition	Ross Collier Cockburn	5,758
Labour	James Hamilton Ballantyne	3,338

1921 Canadian federal election: Toronto East
Party	Candidate	Votes	%	±%
Conservative	Edmond Baird Ryckman	5,392		
Progressive	Walter Leigh Rayfield	3,984		
Independent	Thomas Foster	3,680		
Labour	John William Bruce	1,822		
Liberal	Elizabeth Bethune Kiely	52		
