= 1927 Toronto municipal election =

Municipal elections were held in Toronto, Ontario, Canada, on January 1, 1927. Thomas Foster was running for his third consecutive term as mayor and won a narrow victory over Sam McBride. There were two referendums as part of the vote. Toronto voters voted in favour of adopting daylight saving time for the city. They also voted in favour of spending money to create an ornate gate at the entrance to the Exhibition Place, which became the Princes' Gates.

== Toronto mayor ==
Thomas Foster had first been elected to city council in 1891 and was running for his third consecutive term as mayor. He was opposed by Sam McBride and labour candidate William D. Robbins. Foster was reelected by a narrow margin.

Results
Thomas Foster - 42,617
Sam McBride - 38,477
William D. Robbins - 6,317

== Board of Control ==
There was only one change in the membership of the Board of Control. Sam McBride chose to run for mayor, and the open seat was won by former Alderman Bert Wemp who had tried, but failed, to capture a board seat the year before.

Results
Joseph Gibbons (incumbent) - 48,739
A.E. Hacker (incumbent) - 43,153
D.C. MacGregor (incumbent) - 34,813
Bert Wemp - 34,450
J. George Ramsden - 26,489
Clifford Blackburn - 22,959
Frank Whetter - 21,878
James Simpson - 10,946

== City council ==
Ward 1 (Riverdale)
W.A. Summerville (incumbent) - 6,500
Robert Siberry - 4,707
Robert Allen - 3,926
Robert Luxton (incumbent) - 3,822
Richard Honeyford - 3,747
Bertie Grant - 2,488
William Tyler - 590
Samuel Fieldhouse - 438

Ward 2 (Cabbagetown and Rosedale)
John Winnett (incumbent) - 5,618
James Cameron - 5,513
John R. Beamish (incumbent) - 4,882
Charles A. Risk (incumbent) - 4,591

Ward 3 (Central Business District and The Ward)
Harry W. Hunt (incumbent) - 6,879
Andrew Carrick (incumbent) - 4,324
Percy Quinn - 3,565
Robert Yeomans - 3,016
Wallace Kennedy - 1,826

Ward 4 (Kensington Market and Garment District)
Claude Pearce - 3,798
Ian Macdonnell (incumbent) - 3,468
Nathan Phillips (incumbent) - 3,091
Samuel Factor (incumbent) - 2,615
Mason Saunders - 1,802
Jacob Romer - 441

Ward 5 (Trinity-Bellwoods)
William James Stewart (incumbent) - 6,954
Wesley Benson - 4,767
Benjamin Miller (incumbent) - 4,416
Sol Eisen - 2,208
Robert Prince - 1,241
Robert Leslie - 2,711
Joseph Bell - 1,763

Ward 6 (Davenport and Parkdale)
Brook Sykes - 9,482
John Laxton (incumbent) - 7,362
John Boland (incumbent) - 7,182
Richard Tuthill - 4,280
Gordon Gibb - 3,327
Alexander Greenhill - 1,358
Albert Robinson - 1,202

Ward 7 (West Toronto Junction)
Alexander Chisholm - 3,993
William J. Wadsworth - 3,756
Samuel Ryding (incumbent) - 3,742
William Davidson (incumbent) - 3,492
Albert Smith - 546

Ward 8 (East Toronto)
Walter Howell (incumbent) - 4,988
Robert Dibble (incumbent) - 4,892
Robert Baker (incumbent) - 4,340
Isaac Pimblett - 3,874
Albert Burnese - 3,348
William Robertston - 2,576
Joseph Turner - 1,233
David Mackay - 572
Dave McCorie - 394
Albert Jacks - 315

Results taken from the January 1, 1927 Toronto Daily Star and might not exactly match final tallies.
