= 1934 Toronto municipal election =

Municipal elections were held in Toronto, Ontario, Canada, on January 1, 1934. William James Stewart easily won reelection to his fourth term as mayor. This election also marked a major reduction in the size of city council. Previously each ward had elected three members, starting this year each ward had only two representatives.

== Toronto mayor ==
William James Stewart had been elected mayor in 1931, and was running in his fourth election. His nearest competitor was Alderman H.L. Rogers.

Results
William James Stewart - 72,536
H.L. Rogers - 17,222
A.E. Smith - 8,208
Albert Hacker - 6,440

== Board of Control ==
For the second election in a row the membership of the Board of Control remained unchanged. Only the order the members were returned altered. One notable candidate was Alice Buck, wife of imprisoned Communist leader Tim Buck.

Results
Sam McBride (incumbent) - 54,855
J. George Ramsden (incumbent) - 48,152
James Simpson (incumbent) - 47,358
William D. Robbins (incumbent) - 37,714
William J. Wadsworth - 36,289
Claude Pearce - 31,156
Percy Quinn - 26,872
Alice Buck - 9,767
Harry Bradley - 2,623

== City council ==
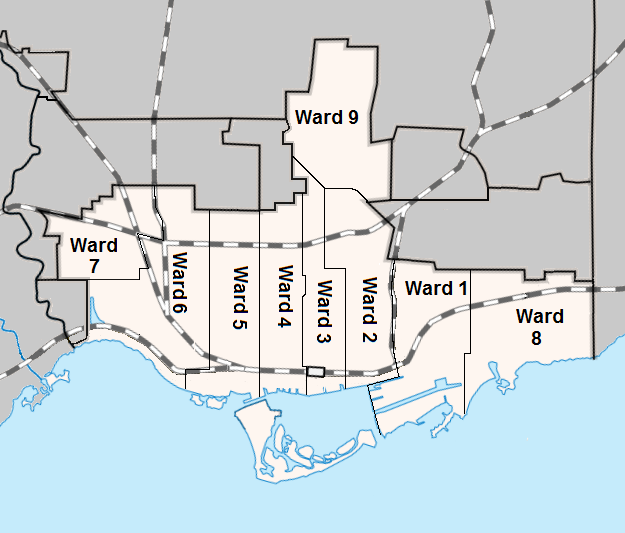
Ward boundaries used in the 1934 election

Beginning with this election, the number of aldermen was reduced to two per ward.

Ward 1 (Riverdale)
Ralph Day (incumbent) - 7,658
Frank M. Johnston (incumbent) - 6,858
Robert Allen (incumbent) - 5,673
David Spencer - 1,580
Thomas Cooney - 977

Ward 2 (Cabbagetown and Rosedale)
Harry Gladstone Clarke (incumbent) - 4,619
John R. Beamish (incumbent) - 2,957
John Winnett (incumbent) - 1,921
William Dennison - 2,659
Frank Ward - 1,291
John Murray - 444

Ward 3 (Central Business District)
Harry W. Hunt (incumbent) - 3,007
John Laidlaw - 2,521
John Corcoran (incumbent) - 2,263
Lumsden Cummings - 1,211

Ward 4 (Kensington Market and Garment District)
J.J. Glass (incumbent) - 4,823
Nathan Phillips (incumbent) - 4,301
Thomas Cruden - 2,004
Myer Klig - 934

Ward 5 (Trinity-Bellwoods)
Fred Hamilton (incumbent) - 6,636
George Duthie (incumbent) - 5,286
Thomas Holdswoth (incumbent) - 4,011
Charles Ward - 2,460
James Conner - 1,905
Thomas Black - 1,798
Alfred Willicombe - 938

Ward 6 (Davenport and Parkdale)
William Duckworth (incumbent) - 10,770
D.C. MacGregor (incumbent) - 8,067
Harold Tracy - 5,674
John Russell (incumbent) - 5,417
Edward Mosur - 1,299

Ward 7 (West Toronto Junction)
George H. Gardiner - 6,035
Frank Whetter (incumbent) - 5,085
Harry Wynn - 2,764
George Watson - 2,046
James Morris - 348

Ward 8 (East Toronto)
Goldwin Elgie (incumbent) - 11,052
Ernest Bray (incumbent) - 9,603
Robert Baker (incumbent) - 7,032
David Weir - 1,327

Ward 9 (North Toronto)
Harold Kirby (incumbent) - 6,424
William D. Ellis (incumbent) - 6,195
Neil MacMillan - 3,332
Cecil Dunsford - 2,263
George McCollum - 1,510
John McGonnell - 475

Results taken from the January 2, 1934 Toronto Star and might not exactly match final tallies.
