= 1932 Toronto municipal election =

Municipal elections were held in Toronto, Ontario, Canada, on January 1, 1932.

William James Stewart had been elected mayor the previous year. No one chose to run against him and so he was acclaimed as mayor, the first such acclamation since 1921.

== Board of Control ==
There was one change on the Board of Control: Controller Albert Hacker was ousted as ex-mayor Sam McBride returned to municipal politics and won a spot.

Results
James Simpson (incumbent) - 42,010
J. George Ramsden (incumbent) - 38,200
Sam McBride - 31,939
William D. Robbins (incumbent) - 31,067
Albert Hacker (incumbent) - 30,348
Claude Pearce - 23,659
Mrs. James Cotton - 6,440
Tim Buck - 5,974
Harry Bradley - 1,726

== City council ==
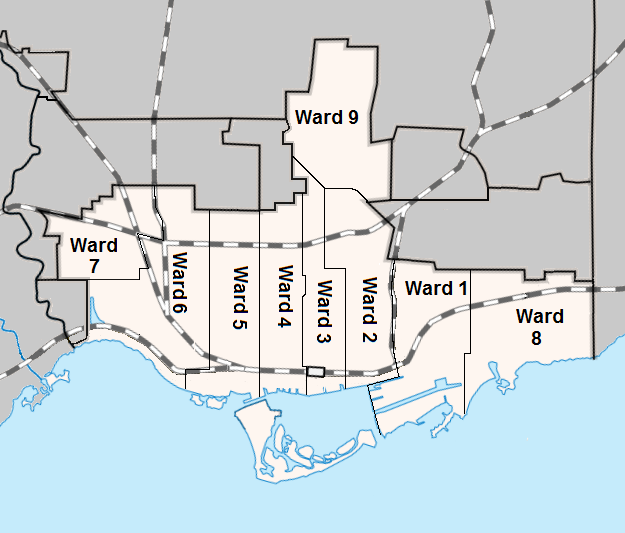
Ward boundaries used in the 1932 election.

For the 1932 election, a new ward, Ward 9, was carved out of the northern portions of Wards 2 and 3. Ward 9 covered the rapidly growing areas of North Toronto. Because it still had a smaller population compared to the others, it elected only two councillors rather than the standard three.

Ward 1 (Riverdale)
Ralph Day (incumbent) - 4,935
Robert Siberry (incumbent) - 4,791
Frank M. Johnston (incumbent) - 3,902
Robert Allen - 3,732
Gordon Millen - 3,716
Ernest Sears - 1,111
Harry Brandwood - 905

Ward 2 (Cabbagetown and Rosedale)
Harry Gladstone Clarke - 3,830
John R. Beamish (incumbent) - 2,869
John Winnett (incumbent) - 2,241
James Cameron (incumbent) - 2,188

Ward 3 (Central Business District)
Harry W. Hunt (incumbent) - 1,932
H.L. Rogers (incumbent) - 1,614
Percy Quinn (incumbent) - 1,549
Andrew Carrick - 1,403

Ward 4 (Kensington Market and Garment District)
J.J. Glass (incumbent) - 4,273
Nathan Phillips (incumbent) - 4,707
Baird Ryckman (incumbent) - 2,073
Charles Ward - 1,996
Joseph Gordon - 1,931
Harry Guralnick - 505

Ward 5 (Trinity-Bellwoods)
Thomas Holdswoth (incumbent) - 4,894
Fred Hamilton (incumbent) - 4,807
Robert Leslie (incumbent) - 4,240
Charles Carrie - 4,146
Harry Tait - 2,375
John Boychuk - 758
Jacob Romer - 721
A.E. Petrie - 698
Alex Gordon - 377

Ward 6 (Davenport and Parkdale)
John Boland - 5,950
William Duckworth (incumbent) - 5,286
D.C. MacGregor (incumbent) - 5,079
Albert Chamberlain (incumbent) - 4,932
Richard Tuthill - 2,117
Donald Gillies - 2,092
Daniel Reed - 496

Ward 7 (West Toronto Junction)
William J. Wadsworth (incumbent) - 4,693
Frank Whetter (incumbent) - 4,009
Alexander Chisholm (incumbent) - 3,992
Woodburn - 1,874
Rice - 1,310
George Watson - 683

Ward 8 (East Toronto)
Goldwin Elgie (incumbent) - 7,638
Ernest Bray (incumbent) - 4,981
Walter Howell - 4,409
Robert Baker (incumbent) - 4,377
Mackay - 2,757

Ward 9 (North Toronto)
Harold Kirby - 4,274
William D. Ellis - 3,469
Cecil Dunsford - 2,173
Neil MacMillan - 1,699
Morley Pritchard - 789

Results taken from the January 2, 1932 Toronto Star and might not exactly match final tallies.
