= 1933 Toronto municipal election =

Municipal elections were held in Toronto, Ontario, Canada, on January 2, 1933. William James Stewart was elected to his third term by the largest margin in city history.

== Toronto mayor ==
William James Stewart had been elected mayor in 1931, and was running in his third election. He was easily reelected with his closest opponent being Alderman Robert Leslie.

Results
William James Stewart - 85,407
Robert Leslie - 26,007
H.B. Tuthill - 1,869

== Board of Control ==
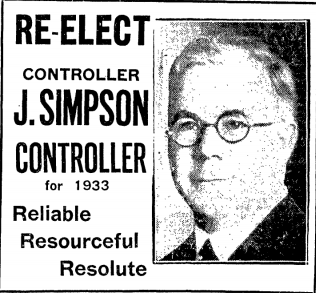
A campaign ad from James Simpson

For the first time since its creation the composition of the Board of Control was unchanged by the election.

Results
J. George Ramsden (incumbent) - 55,503
Sam McBride (incumbent) - 55,323
James Simpson (incumbent) - 54,218
William D. Robbins (incumbent) - 48,061
Albert Hacker - 37,019
John Boland - 36,645
William Miller - 18,836
Mrs. James Cotton - 11,871
Alice Buck - 10,155
W.J. Haire - 3,066
J.H.H. Ballantyne - 2,183

== City council ==
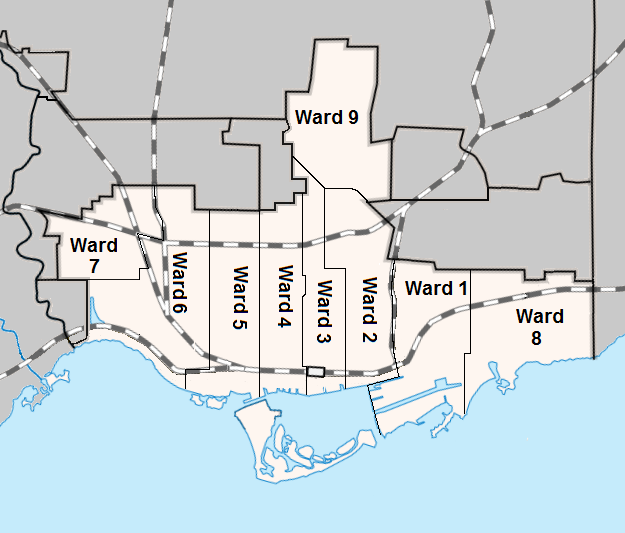
Ward boundaries used in the 1933 election

Ward 1 (Riverdale)
Frank M. Johnston (incumbent) - 7,357
Ralph Day (incumbent) - 6,852
Robert Allen - 5,600
Gordon Millen - 5,001
Lorne Trull - 4,777
Ernest Sears - 1,782
Thomas Cooney - 1,069

Ward 2 (Cabbagetown and Rosedale)
Harry Gladstone Clarke (incumbent) - 5,468
John R. Beamish (incumbent) - 4,300
John Winnett (incumbent) - 3,660
James Cameron - 3,459
John Murray - 1,025

Ward 3 (Central Business District)
Harry W. Hunt (incumbent) - 3,631
H.L. Rogers (incumbent) - 2,943
John Corcoran - 2,519
Andrew Carrick - 2,093
Frank Ward - 835
Abraham Goldberg - 374

Ward 4 (Kensington Market and Garment District)
Nathan Phillips (incumbent) - 4,707
J.J. Glass (incumbent) - 4,273
Claude Pearce - 4,193
Abraham Singer - 3,464

Ward 5 (Trinity-Bellwoods)
Thomas Holdswoth (incumbent) - 7,932
Fred Hamilton (incumbent) - 7,524
George Duthie - 4,883
Charles Ward - 4,052
Thomas Black - 2,419
S.D. Cushen - 1,469
James Conner - 1,905
John Martin - 650

Ward 6 (Davenport and Parkdale)
William Duckworth (incumbent) - 9,523
D.C. MacGregor (incumbent) - 9,267
John Russell - 7,948
Harold Tracy - 5,115
John Laxton - 4,250
Brook Sykes - 2,568
Robert Stanley - 2,482
William Black - 1,682
Thomas Cruden - 1,353
James Hicks - 1,108

Ward 7 (West Toronto Junction)
William J. Wadsworth (incumbent) - 6,479
Alexander Chisholm (incumbent) - 5,499
Frank Whetter (incumbent) - 5,009
Harry Wynn - 2,494
George Watson - 2,226
John Whetton - 1,421

Ward 8 (East Toronto)
Goldwin Elgie (incumbent) - 12,029
Ernest Bray (incumbent) - 9,221
Robert Baker - 8,432
Walter Howell (incumbent) - 7,397
David Weir - 1,907
John McGonnell - 807

Ward 9 (North Toronto)
Harold Kirby (incumbent) - 7,854
William D. Ellis (incumbent) - 6,506
Neil MacMillan - 4,973

Results taken from the January 3, 1933 Toronto Star and might not exactly match final tallies.
