= 1931 Toronto municipal election =

Municipal elections were held in Toronto, Ontario, Canada, on January 1, 1931. William James Stewart was elected mayor after winning a close contest again former mayor Sam McBride.

== Toronto mayor ==
Incumbent mayor Bert Wemp did not run as he required major abdominal surgery. Running to replace him was former mayor McBride, who had been defeated by Wemp in the 1930 campaign. He was opposed by Alderman Stewart, who won the vote by a slim margin.

Results
William James Stewart - 57,500
Sam McBride - 57,110

== Board of Control ==
Two incumbents were defeated on the Board of Control: Claude Pearce and W.A. Summerville. Former controller Albert Hacker, who had been defeated the previous year regained a seat. The other new seat was won by Alderman J. George Ramsden.

Results
J. George Ramsden - 51,043
William D. Robbins (incumbent) - 50,801
James Simpson (incumbent) - 48,105
Albert Hacker - 43,763
John Boland - 41,779
Claude Pearce (incumbent) - 40,431
W.A. Summerville (incumbent) - 19,087
Thomas Foster - 13,491
Mrs. James Cotton - 9,014
George King - 3,154
Tim Buck - 3,010

== City council ==
Ward 1 (Riverdale)
Robert Siberry (incumbent) - 7,458
Ralph Day - 4,501
Frank M. Johnston - 4,361
Lorne Trull (incumbent) - 4,323
Robert Allen (incumbent) - 4,192
Robert Luxton - 3,398
William Taylor - 1,588
Alexander MacDonald - 707
John Lang - 610
Harry Perkins - 468

Ward 2 (Cabbagetown and Rosedale)
John R. Beamish (incumbent) - 5,359
James Cameron (incumbent) - 5,007
John Winnett (incumbent) - 4,247
Robert Yeomans - 3,835
Hugh Sutherland - 3,774
Raymond Hughes - 2,584
Joseph Miller - 2,480
Cecil Dunsford - 1,176
John Carter - 770
Charles Parks - 683
Frank Gallagher - 640
William Sanders - 600

Ward 3 (Central Business District)
Harry W. Hunt (incumbent) - 6,709
Percy Quinn - 4,554
H.L. Rogers - 4,211
Andrew Carrick (incumbent) - 3,003
Reginald Shaw - 2,026
Frank Burton - 1,610
Algernon Brocklesby - 1,313
James Merrick - 729
Harry Winberg - 430

Ward 4 (Kensington Market and Garment District)
Baird Ryckman - 4,311
J.J. Glass - 3,429
Nathan Phillips (incumbent) - 3,389
Charles Ward (incumbent) - 2,372
Joseph Gordon - 2,205
Abraham Singer - 2,185
Charles Lewis - 702
Max Shur - 227

Ward 5 (Trinity-Bellwoods)
Robert Leslie (incumbent) - 5,921
Thomas Holdswoth - 5,841
Fred Hamilton (incumbent) - 5,737
Wesley Benson - 5,550
Louis Fine - 4,450
S.H. Menzies - 2,291
Harry Tait - 1,665
Thomas Black - 1,287
John McIntyre - 610
John Boychuk - 363

Ward 6 (Davenport and Parkdale)
D.C. MacGregor (incumbent) - 8,315
Albert Chamberlain - 8,171
William Duckworth - 6,649
John Laxton - 5,911
Joseph Wright (incumbent) - 5,911
Brook Sykes - 3,613
Richard Tuthill - 3,203
James Gill - 1,084
Daniel Reed - 793

Ward 7 (West Toronto Junction)
William J. Wadsworth (incumbent) - 4,615
Frank Whetter - 4,596
Alexander Chisholm (incumbent) - 3,468
Samuel Ryding (incumbent) - 2,687
Christopher Woodburn - 2,380
Allan Rice - 2,285
John Whetton - 1,471

Ward 8 (East Toronto)
Goldwin Elgie - 9,548
Ernest Bray (incumbent) - 6,895
Robert Baker- 6,188
Walter Howell (incumbent) - 6,057
Robert Dibble - 5,638
David Mackay - 3,343
William Robertston - 1,119
Roy Tanner - 388

Results taken from the January 2, 1931 Toronto Star and might not exactly match final tallies.
