= 1928 Toronto municipal election =

Municipal elections were held in Toronto, Ontario, Canada, on January 1, 1928. Sam McBride was elected mayor, defeating incumbent Thomas Foster by a wide margin.

== Toronto mayor ==
Thomas Foster had first been elected to city council in 1891 and was running for his fourth consecutive term as mayor. He was opposed by Sam McBride who had tried, but failed, to be elected mayor on three previous occasions.

Results
Sam McBride - 50,324
Thomas Foster - 34,785

== Board of Control ==
There was only one change in the membership of the Board of Control. William D. Robbins regained the seat he had lost two years earlier to D.C. MacGregor.

Results
Bert Wemp (incumbent) - 47,153
Joseph Gibbons (incumbent) - 45,655
A.E. Hacker (incumbent) - 33,433
William D. Robbins - 29,359
D.C. MacGregor (incumbent) - 28,858
Brook Sykes - 24,427
Benjamin Miller - 18,122
James Simpson - 12,954

== City council ==
Ward 1 (Riverdale)
Robert Siberry (incumbent) - 6,661
W.A. Summerville (incumbent) - 6,277
Robert Luxton - 5,202
Robert Allen (incumbent) - 5,135
George Smith - 2,728

Ward 2 (Cabbagetown and Rosedale)
John R. Beamish (incumbent) - 5,303
John Winnett (incumbent) - 5,759
James Cameron (incumbent) - 5,629
Arthur Dyas - 3,738
Roy Tanner - 1,086

Ward 3 (Central Business District and The Ward)
Harry W. Hunt (incumbent) - acclaimed
Andrew Carrick (incumbent) - acclaimed
Percy Quinn (incumbent) - acclaimed

Ward 4 (Kensington Market and Garment District)
Nathan Phillips (incumbent) - 5,434
Claude Pearce (incumbent) - 4,057
Joseph Gordon - 3,765
Ian Macdonnell (incumbent) - 3,197
Jacob Romer - 443
Max Shur - 293
Reuben Rodness - 262

Ward 5 (Trinity-Bellwoods)
William James Stewart (incumbent) - 4,913
Wesley Benson (incumbent) - 4,740
Clifford Blackburn - 4,135
Sol Eisen - 2,856
Robert Leslie - 2,711
David Goldstick - 1,917
Mary McNab - 899

Ward 6 (Davenport and Parkdale)
Joseph Wright - 9,117
John Laxton (incumbent) - 5,855
John Boland (incumbent) - 5,651
Gordon Gibb - 3,647
Richard Tuthill - 2,565
E.L. Wright - 2,095
Albert Robinson - 1,688
Tim Buck - 961

Ward 7 (West Toronto Junction)
William J. Wadsworth (incumbent) - 4,165
Frank Whetter - 3,943
Samuel Ryding (incumbent) - 3,589
Alexander Chisholm (incumbent) - 3,927

Ward 8 (East Toronto)
Robert Dibble (incumbent) - 6,848
Walter Howell (incumbent) - 6,337
Robert Baker (incumbent) - 5,446
Isaac Pimblett - 4,914
William Robertston - 4,028

Results taken from the January 2, 1928 Toronto Daily Star and might not exactly match final tallies.
