= 1930 Toronto municipal election =

Municipal elections were held in Toronto, Ontario, Canada, on January 1, 1930. In a close mayoral election Bert Wemp ousted two term incumbent Sam McBride. The main issue of the election was a proposed downtown beautification scheme that would have rebuilt roads in the core. The proposal was rejected in a referendum after voters in the suburbs voted against it. McBride was the plan's leading proponent, and its rejection hurt his reelection bid.

== Toronto mayor ==
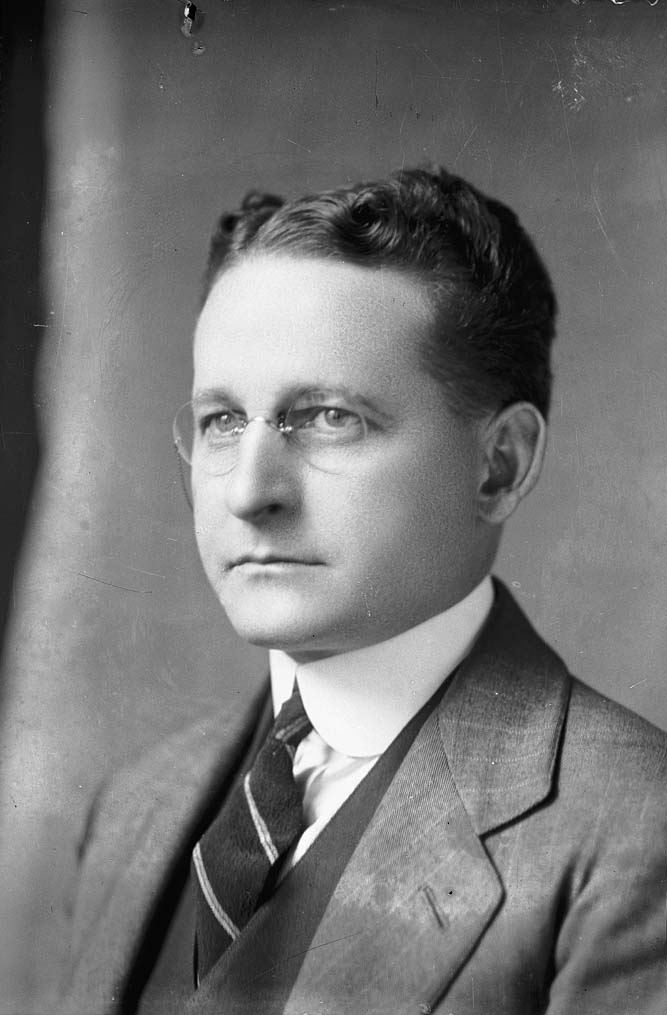
Bert Wemp was elected mayor

McBride had been elected mayor in 1928 and had been in office two years. He was defeated by controller and Toronto Telegram editor Bert Wemp by 4,378 votes. Also running was controller A.E. Hacker, but he finished in distant third.

Results
Bert Wemp - 54,309
Sam McBride - 49,933
Albert E. Hacker - 3,210

== Board of Control ==
Only one member of the Board of Control elected in the last election was running for reelection: W.A. Summerville. Hacker and Wemp had both chosen to run for mayor. Joseph Gibbons had been appointed to the board of Toronto Hydro and was replaced mid-term by Alderman Frank Whetter, but he was defeated when he tried to run for a full term. Elected were two candidates considered representatives of labour: James Simpson and William D. Robbins. The other new Controller was Claude Pearce, who had strong support from Roman Catholic voters.

Results
W.A. Summerville (incumbent) - 47,418
Claude Pearce - 46,692
James Simpson - 44,921
William D. Robbins - 39,023
Benjamin Miller - 37,156
Frank Whetter (incumbent) - 31,772
Brook Sykes - 28,043
Wesley Benson - 25,054
Harry Bradley - 2,617

== City council ==
Ward 1 (Riverdale)
Robert Siberry (incumbent) - 8,567
Robert Allen (incumbent) - 7,187
Lorne Trull - 6,382
Frank M. Johnston (incumbent) - 5,047
William Taylor - 3,184
Harry Perkins - 1,837

Ward 2 (Cabbagetown and Rosedale)
John R. Beamish (incumbent) - 6,754
John Winnett (incumbent) - 5,972
James Cameron (incumbent) - 5,017
Joseph Miller - 5,386
Robert Yeomans - 4,191
Hugh Sutherland - 3,486
Frank Gallagher - 1,010

Ward 3 (Central Business District)
J. George Ramsden - 6,256
Harry W. Hunt (incumbent) - 3,562
Andrew Carrick (incumbent) - 4,286
H.L. Rogers - 4,211
George Yorke - 4,102
Wallace Kennedy - 2,576

Ward 4 (Kensington Market and Garment District)
Samuel Factor (incumbent) - 4,022
Nathan Phillips (incumbent) - 3,995
Charles Ward - 3,386
John McMulkin - 3,086
George King - 1,941
Jacob Romer - 1,124

Ward 5 (Trinity-Bellwoods)
William James Stewart (incumbent) - 6,060
Fred Hamilton (incumbent) - 5,035
Robert Leslie - 5,013
Louis Fine - 3,825
James Phinnemore - 3,111
Garnet Archibald - 2,765
Mary McNab - 1,161
Max Shur - 317

Ward 6 (Davenport and Parkdale)
Joseph Wright (incumbent) - 10,576
D.C. MacGregor - 8,330
John Boland (incumbent) - 7,325
John Laxton (incumbent) - 7,125
S.I. Wright - 5,404
Joseph King - 978
James Gill - 912
Albert Smith - 550

Ward 7 (West Toronto Junction)
William J. Wadsworth (incumbent) - 5,701
Alexander Chisholm (incumbent) - 4,576
Samuel Ryding (incumbent) - 4,381
John Whetton - 2,861
George Watson - 830

Ward 8 (East Toronto)
Walter Howell (incumbent) - 7,921
Ernest Bray - 7,569
Albert Burnese (incumbent) - 7,123
Robert Baker (incumbent) - 7,037
William Robertston - 2,978

Results taken from the January 2, 1930 Toronto Star and might not exactly match final tallies.
