= December 1936 Toronto municipal election =

Municipal election in Toronto, Canada

Municipal elections were held in Toronto, Ontario, Canada, on December 7, 1936, after being moved up from the traditional New Year's Day vote. William D. Robbins was easily elected mayor to his first full term in office.

== Toronto mayor ==
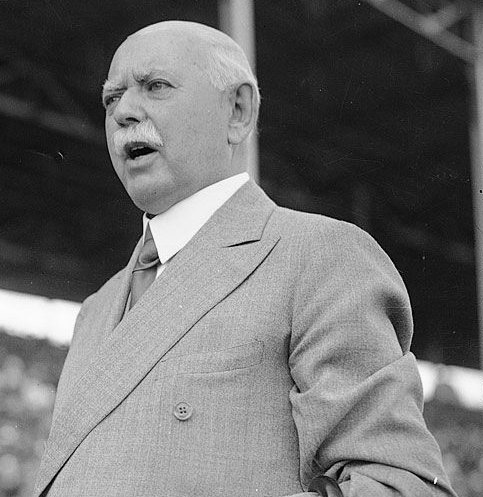
William D. Robbins was easily reelected mayor

William D. Robbins had been appointed to the office of mayor earlier in the year after the death of incumbent Sam McBride. Challenging Robbins for the post was Alderman John Laidlaw and veteran Robert Harding. Robbins was easily reelected, winning a majority of the vote in every ward. One of his main campaign pledges was the construction of an airport for the city of Toronto. This was realized in 1939 with the creation of the Toronto Island Airport.

Results
William D. Robbins - 74,844
John Laidlaw - 22,018
Robert Harding - 4,045

== Board of Control ==
The promotion of Robbins to the mayoralty and the decision of Controller J. George Ramsden to retire left to vacancies on the Board of Control. The two incumbents were reelected, and three aldermen and Communist leader Tim Buck competed for the two open seats. Frederick J. Conboy and Fred Hamilton were elected.

Results
Ralph Day (incumbent) - 56,847
Frederick J. Conboy - 48,976
William J. Wadsworth (incumbent) - 48,047
Fred Hamilton - 39,003
Douglas McNish - 32,265
Tim Buck - 31,342
Alfred Burgess - 3,983
Harry Bradley - 3,295

== City council ==
The Communist Party of Canada managed to elect Stewart Smith to City Council from Ward 5. In future elections he would be joined by other Communists such as J.B. Salsberg in forming a far left faction on city council. The Communist Party, and its successor the Labor-Progressive Party would continue to elect members to council until the late 1940s.

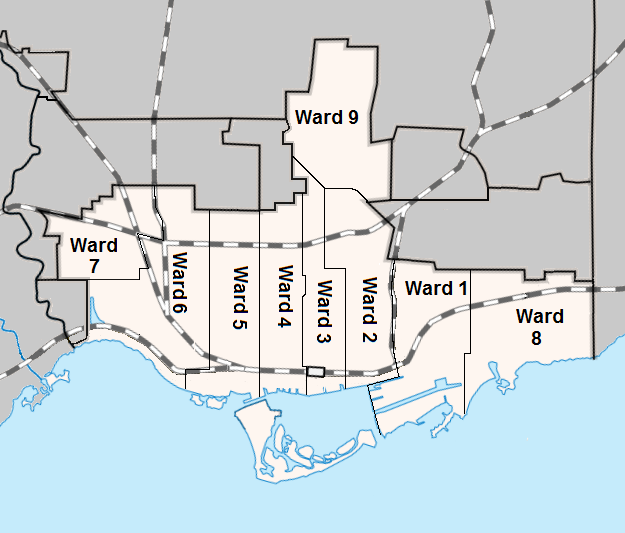
Ward boundaries used in the 1936 election

Ward 1 (Riverdale)
W.A. Summerville (incumbent) - 6,794
Frank M. Johnston (incumbent) - 6,717
Graham Spry - 3,440
Ernest Hewett - 2,727
Harry Bell - 1,161

Ward 2 (Cabbagetown and Rosedale)
Allan Lamport - 3,982
Adelaide Plumptre (incumbent) - 3,445
John R. Beamish (incumbent) - 3,194
William Dennison - 1,479
Winston George Harris - 808
Bob King - 320
William McFerran - 221

Ward 3 (Central Business District)
John S. Simmons (incumbent) - 2,785
Percy Quinn - 1,784
Fred Bartrem - 1,419
Neil MacMillan - 961
Jean Laing - 692

Ward 4 (Kensington Market and Garment District)
Nathan Phillips (incumbent) - 4,127
Robert Hood Saunders (incumbent) - 3,884
J.B. Salsberg - 3,633
Herbert Orliffe - 813
Albert Leslie - 673

Ward 5 (Trinity-Bellwoods
Stewart Smith - 3,500
Ernest Bogart - 3,076
Albert Hacker - 3,041
Ward Markle - 2,862
Clifford McBride - 2,713
Harold Menzies - 2,618
Charles Ward - 1,773
Harold Kerr - 896
James Conner - 795
Alfons Stanewski - 616
Thomas Guy - 439
Valentine Burda - 273
Basil Ingelby - 165

Ward 6 (Davenport and Parkdale)
D.C. MacGregor (incumbent) - 6,786
George Grannell - 5,044
William V. Muir - 4,182
William Miller - 3,439
John Reid - 2,658
Neil Cameron - 2,129
Harry Stephenson - 1,518
Jones - 1,031
Bertram Tipping - 746
William Logie - 742
Grace Farrow - 370

Ward 7 (West Toronto Junction)
George H. Gardiner (incumbent) - 5,125
Frank Whetter (incumbent) - 3,603
Charles Rowntree - 3,206
McMurray - 895
Thompson - 533
Shaw - 296

Ward 8 (The Beaches)
Walter Howell (incumbent) - 8,116
Ernest Bray (incumbent) - 8,001
Ernest Woollon - 4,725
Frederick Collins - 1,390
David Weir - 615

Ward 9 (North Toronto)
William D. Ellis (incumbent) - 6,580
William Croft - 5,338
John Innes - 5,282

Results taken from the December 8, 1936 Toronto Star and might not exactly match final tallies.
