= 1935 Toronto municipal election =

Municipal elections were held in Toronto, Ontario, Canada, on January 1, 1935. James Simpson won a surprise victory in the mayoral campaign to become the first socialist candidate elected to the office.

== Toronto mayor ==
Incumbent William James Stewart chose not to run for reelection. The race to succeed him became focused on two candidates. James Simpson, known as "People's Jimmy" was a long serving member of the Board of Control and former vice-president of the Trades and Labour Congress of Canada. He was an active member of the Co-operative Commonwealth Federation and a self-described socialist. Simpson was strongly opposed by many religious leaders, former mayor Stewart, and three of the four daily newspapers. Only the Toronto Daily Star endorsed his run. The other three papers endorsed Alderman Harry W. Hunt who finished a close second. Also running were controller J. George Ramsden and communist Reverend A.E. Smith, but they finished considerably back.

Results
James Simpson - 54,400
Harry W. Hunt - 50,986
J. George Ramsden - 16,851
A.E. Smith - 4,760

== Board of Control ==
Incumbent Sam McBride and William D. Robbins won reelection to the Board of Control. As Simpson and Ramsden chose to run for mayor, this left two vacancies on the board. These were filled by Alderman Ralph Day and former alderman William J. Wadsworth. Finishing further back were two ex-controllers, Claude Pierce and A.E. Hacker. Also running were social activist Adelaide Plumptre and Communist leader Tim Buck. Alderman George Duthie was also a candidate but withdrew

Results
Sam McBride (incumbent) - 71,177
William J. Wadsworth - 58,783
William D. Robbins (incumbent) - 44,820
Ralph Day - 41,515
Claude Pearce - 34,064
Adelaide Plumptre - 32,872
A.E Hacker - 29,110
Frank Regan - 26,242
Tim Buck - 9,938

== City council ==
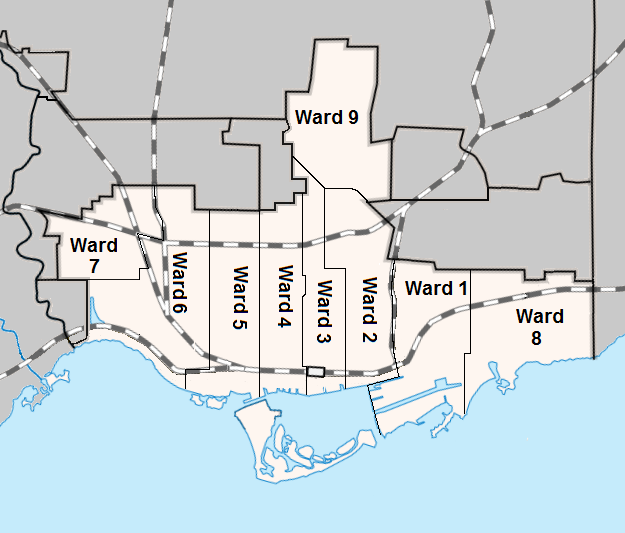
Ward boundaries used in the 1935 election

Ward 1 (Riverdale)
Frank M. Johnston (incumbent) - 7,412
W.A. Summerville - 5,171
Gordon Millen - 4,682
Zeph Hilton - 3,736
Clifford Lock - 1,686
David Spencer - 881
Thomas Cooney - 858

Ward 2 (Cabbagetown and Rosedale)
Harry Gladstone Clarke (incumbent) - 6,082
John R. Beamish (incumbent) - 4,738
William Dennison - 2,659
Percy Bishop - 2348
Thomas James - 465

Ward 3 (Central Business District)
John Laidlaw (incumbent) - 2,990
John S. Simmons - 2,334
Arnold Ferguson - 1,980
Albert Kinnear - 1,696
Fred Ross - 925
Alfred Burgess - 490
C.A. Risk - 457
Abraham Golberg - 294
Joseph Kent - 290

Ward 4 (Kensington Market and Garment District)
Robert Hood Saunders - 4,779
Nathan Phillips (incumbent) - 4,691
H.M. Goodman - 2,293
Ida Siegel - 2,130
Myer Klig - 1,068
Max Federman - 552
Max Orenstein - 534
S.C. Schiller - 419

Ward 5 (Trinity-Bellwoods)
Fred Hamilton (incumbent) - 6,483
Robert Leslie - 5,931
Harold Menzies - 3,091
Thomas Black - 2,907
Stewart Smith - 1,871
James Conner - 1,576
Charles Kerr - 1,045
Albert Plenty - 499

Ward 6 (Davenport and Parkdale)
Frederick J. Conboy - 12,961
D.C. MacGregor (incumbent) - 9,015
Harold Tracy - 6,530
Robert Stanley - 3,714
Harry Stephenson - 1,575
George Granell - 600
Bertram Tipping - 475

Ward 7 (West Toronto Junction)
George H. Gardiner (incumbent) - 7,217
Frank Whetter (incumbent) - 5,698
Harry Wynn - 3,267
John McPhee - 1,594

Ward 8 (East Toronto)
Ernest Bray (incumbent) - 9,603
Walter Howell - 8,537
Albert Burnese - 4,548
Robert Baker - 4,399
David MacKay - 878
David Weir - 763
Alfred Hambleton - 445

Ward 9 (North Toronto)
William D. Ellis (incumbent) - 8,224
Douglas McNish - 5,435
Herbert Ball - 4,456
John Innes - 3,546
Charles Reeves - 1,646
Walter Wilkinson - 1,689
John McGonnell - 453

Results taken from the January 2, 1935 Toronto Star and might not exactly match final tallies. Ward 3 and 6 results taken from the January 2, 1935 Toronto Telegram.
