= January 1936 Toronto municipal election =

Municipal elections were held in Toronto, Ontario, Canada, on January 1, 1936. Sam McBride was elected mayor in a three-way race in which incumbent James Simpson finished third.

== Toronto mayor ==
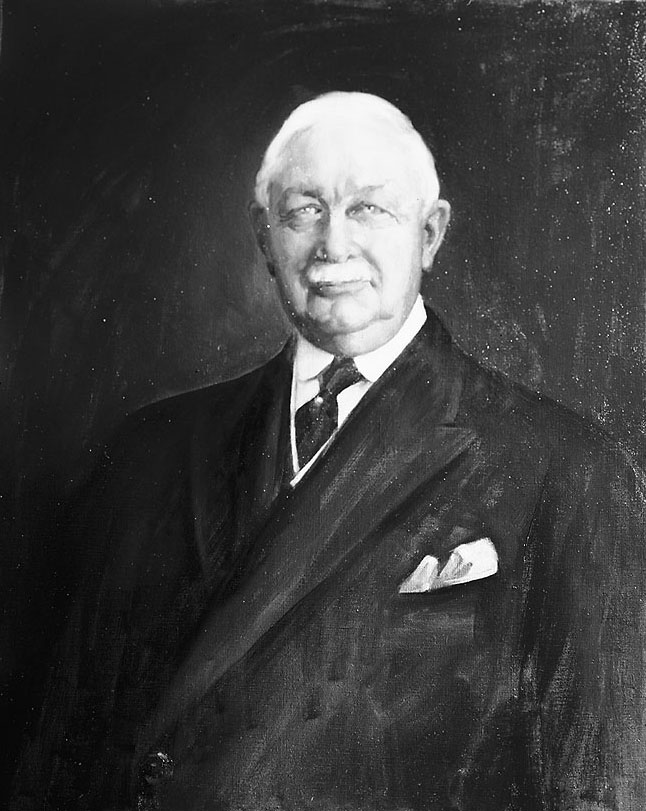
Sam McBride was elected mayor

Sitting controller and former mayor McBride was elected mayor. defeating incumbent James Simpson. Simpson had been elected mayor the year previously. He was the first Co-operative Commonwealth Federation (CCF) member and first socialist elected mayor of the city. The CCF was still a minority in "Tory Toronto" and Simpson's anti-Catholic sentiments also hurt him with the electorate. Former alderman Harry W. Hunt, who had also placed second to Simpson in 1935, finished second again although he had the endorsement of the three conservative newspapers: The Globe, The Mail, and the Telegram. The Star endorsed McBride after having endorsed Simpson the previous election.

Results
Sam McBride - 48,723
Harry W. Hunt - 43,036
James Simpson (incumbent) - 32,636

== Board of Control ==
There was only a single change on the Board of Control: former controller J. George Ramsden returned to the Board filling the space vacated by McBride.

Results
Ralph Day (incumbent) - 68,335
William J. Wadsworth (incumbent) - 62,838
J. George Ramsden - 52,170
William D. Robbins (incumbent) - 51,465
Joseph Elijah Thompson - 31,546
Benjamin Miller - 30,613
Tim Buck - 20,873
Harry Bradley - 4,986

== City council ==
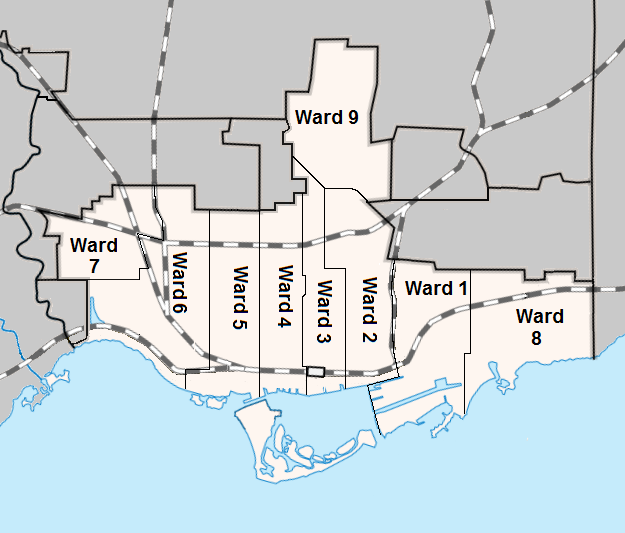
Ward boundaries used in the 1936 election

Ward 1 (Riverdale)
W.A. Summerville (incumbent) - 9,673
Frank M. Johnston (incumbent) - 9,335
Harry Bell - 2,630

Ward 2 (Cabbagetown and Rosedale)
Adelaide Plumptre - 4,203
John R. Beamish (incumbent) - 4,114
Allan Lamport - 2,942
William Dennison - 1,992
Percy Bishop - 1882
George Lewis - 713
Thomas James - 412
Lewis Jones - 171

Ward 3 (Central Business District)
John Laidlaw (incumbent) - 3,795
John S. Simmons (incumbent) - 3,713
Albert Gardner - 2,675

Ward 4 (Kensington Market and Garment District)
Robert Hood Saunders (incumbent) - 4,941
Nathan Phillips (incumbent) - 4,811
H.M. Goodman - 2,466
J.B. Salsberg - 2,343
Max Federman - 816
S.C. Schiller - 225

Ward 5 (Trinity-Bellwoods)
Fred Hamilton (incumbent) - 7,211
Robert Leslie (incumbent) - 5,621
Ward Markle - 3,010
Clifford Blackburn - 2,089
Stewart Smith - 1,967
James Conner - 1,718
Thomas Black - 1,210
Charles Kerr - 1,057
Valentine Burda - 240
L.L. Jarvis - 163

Ward 6 (Davenport and Parkdale)
Frederick J. Conboy (incumbent) - 12,885
D.C. MacGregor (incumbent) - 7,526
William Miller - 4,605
William V. Muir - 3,536
Richard Jones - 1,967
Harry Stephenson - 1,661
Bertram Tipping - 1,030
Robert Harding - 373

Ward 7 (West Toronto Junction)
George H. Gardiner (incumbent) - 5,125
Frank Whetter (incumbent) - 3,603
Charles Rowntree - 3,206
McMurray - 895
Russell Thompson - 533
Shaw - 296

Ward 8 (The Beaches)
Ernest Bray (incumbent) - 9,291
Walter Howell (incumbent) - 8,338
Fred Baker - 7,823
Bert Leavens - 2,508
Philip Hughes - 682

Ward 9 (North Toronto)
Douglas McNish (incumbent) - 8,479
William D. Ellis (incumbent) - 8,353
Ross Sheppard - 5,665
Charles Reeves - 1,548
Alfred Burgess - 1,005

Results taken from the January 2, 1936 Toronto Star and might not exactly match final tallies.

== Vacancy ==
Mayor Sam McBride died on November 14, 1936. Controller William D. Robbins who had been serving as Acting Mayor due to McBride's ill health was unanimously appointed Mayor on November 18; the Board of Control vacancy was not filled.
