= James Simpson (Canadian politician) =

Canadian politician (1873–1938)

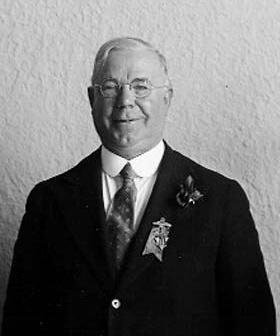

44th Mayor of Toronto
- In office January 1, 1935 – December 31, 1935
- Preceded by: William Stewart
- Succeeded by: Samuel McBride

Toronto Controller
- In office 1914, 1930 – 1935

Personal details
- Born: 1873 Lancashire, England
- Died: September 24, 1938 (aged 64) Toronto, Ontario, Canada
- Party: Cooperative Commonwealth Federation
- Other political affiliations: Socialist Party of Canada Canadian Labour Party
- Occupation: Printer, journalist
- Profession: Trade unionist

James 'Jimmy' Simpson (1873 – September 24, 1938) was a British-Canadian trade unionist, printer, journalist and left-wing politician in Toronto, Ontario. He was a longtime member of Toronto's city council and served as Mayor of Toronto in 1935, the first member of the Cooperative Commonwealth Federation to serve in that capacity. He was also a member of the Orange Order in Canada.

== Early life ==
James Simpson was born in Lancashire, England and immigrated to Canada at the age of 14. Never attending high school, Simpson worked selling newspapers at the age of 10 and then began working for a grocer at the age of 13 before moving to Canada where he worked in a tin factory before joining the printing trade. He was informally known as Jimmy.

== Career ==
=== Printing trade and journalism ===
In 1892, Simpson was one of 27 members of the Typographical Union on strike against the Toronto News. The strikers, including Simpson, founded the Evening Star on November 3, 1892, as a strike paper. For ten years, Simpson served as the Star's City Hall reporter including nine years as the paper's municipal editor. He subsequently became editor of a labour newspaper.

In 1900, Simpson and eight others founded the Ruskin Literary and Debating Society. He served as its first president. Today, it is Canada's oldest debating society.

=== Labour leader ===
Simpson went on to become a labour leader and was the vice-president of the Toronto and District Trades and Labour Council at the turn of the century and also served three terms as vice-president of the Trades and Labour Congress of Canada between 1904 and 1936.

=== Labour Party ===
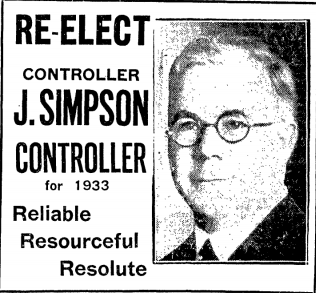
1932 election ad for Simpson

As a socialist labour politician, he ran in the May 1902 Ontario election in Toronto. As a candidate for the newly-formed Socialist Party of Canada, he ran in Toronto North in the 1905 Ontario provincial election and in a 1906 provincial by-election in Toronto and in the 1908 provincial election, all unsuccessfully.

He was elected and served as a Toronto school board trustee, 1905–10.

He ran for mayor of Toronto in the 1908 Toronto municipal election as a Socialist but was not elected.

He was elected to the Toronto Board of Control in 1914 with the highest vote total ever given a candidate up to that time and sat on the Board of Control again from 1930 to 1934.

He was one of the co-leaders of the Ontario Labour Party (Ontario section of the Canadian Labour Party) in the 1920s and a Labour candidate for the House of Commons of Canada in Parkdale in the 1921 Canadian federal election, in Toronto Northwest in 1925 and 1926 Canadian federal elections but was unable to win election to Parliament.

Simpson played a leading role in opposing Communists in the Labour Party. After Communists convinced the party to withdraw its nomination of Simpson as its candidate for Toronto city council's Board of Control in 1927, Simpson and his supporters quit the party leading to its collapse. They then formed the Toronto Labour Party, which explicitly excluded Communists from membership.

=== Mayor ===
In the 1930s, he became a leading member of the Ontario CCF. In 1934 he ran as a CCF candidate for the Toronto Board of Control and was elected which set the stage for him to run for Mayor of Toronto in the 1935 municipal election. The only one of the city's newspapers to support him was the Toronto Daily Star. The other papers and both the Conservative and Liberal parties supported Simpson's opponent, Alderman Harry W. Hunt and accused the CCF of being anti-British and under Communist influence. Percy Parker, a leading Liberal, declared on the radio that "the bells of Moscow will ring when Simpson is elected mayor."

Simpson's personal popularity and the organization put together by the CCF and the trade union movement was enough to elect him making Toronto the largest city in North America to have elected a socialist mayor. As mayor, Simpson supported the campaign to boycott the 1936 Summer Olympics being held in Nazi Germany and holding an alternative games, the People's Olympiad, in Barcelona, Spain instead.

=== Religion ===
Simpson was a Methodist and Christian socialist who became active with the Epworth League movement at the age of 16 ultimately becoming president of the Epworth League Toronto Conference. He also served as president of the Toronto Methodist Young People's Union and the Toronto Methodists' Cycling Union. Simpson was intensely anti-Catholic which cost him the support of the Toronto Star. When he ran for re-election as mayor in 1936 this contributed to his defeat.

== Death ==
Simpson had a very public death when the car he was driving collided into a streetcar at the intersection of Spadina Avenue and Harbour Street. People rushed to save the victims but they ultimately died at Saint Michael's Hospital within a few hours of the crash.

== Electoral Record ==
=== Federal ===
1921 Canadian federal election: Parkdale
Party	Candidate	Votes
Conservative	David Spence	10,705
Liberal	William Douglas	5,487
Labour	James Simpson	2,723

1925 Canadian federal election: Toronto Northwest
Party	Candidate	Votes	%	±%
Conservative	Thomas Langton Church	16,329		
Liberal	James Gilchrist	3,106		
Labour	James Simpson	1,542		
Independent Conservative	Caroline Sophia Brown	544		
Independent Conservative	Wallace Cochrane	104		

1926 Canadian federal election: Toronto Northwest
Party	Candidate	Votes	%	±%
Conservative	Thomas Langton Church	12,071		
Liberal	John Frederick Boyd	2,637		
Labour	James Simpson	1,267		

=== Provincial ===
1905 Ontario general election: Toronto North
Party	Candidate	Votes	Vote %
Conservative	Beattie Nesbitt	5,163	56.4
Liberal	Hugh Blain	3,780	41.3
Socialist	James Simpson	211	2.3
	Total	4,949	

By-election, February 22, 1906: Toronto North
Party	Candidate	Votes	Vote %
Conservative	William McNaught	3,819	57.9
Liberal	Thomas Urquhart	2,518	38.2
Socialist	James Simpson	260	3.9
	Total	6,597	

1908 Ontario general election: Toronto North
Party	Candidate	Votes	Vote %
Conservative	John Shaw	4,176	52.1
Liberal	Mr. Hossack	3,643	45.5
Socialist	James Simpson	190	2.4
	Total	8,008	

=== Municipal ===
1908 Toronto Mayoral Election
Candidate	Votes
Joseph Oliver	14,022
George Reginald Geary	7,124
Beattie Nesbitt	6,504
James Simpson	3,701
Miles Vokes	964

1914 Toronto Board of Control Election
Candidate	Votes
James Simpson	20,695
J.O. McCarthy	17,490
Tommy Church	17,085
John O'Neill	14,597
Joseph Elijah Thompson	14,233
Thomas Foster	13,929
Robert Yeomans	11,708
A. J. H. Eckardt	7,755

1930 Toronto Board of Control Election
Candidate	Votes
W.A. Summerville	47,418
Claude Pearce	46,692
James Simpson	44,921
William D. Robbins	39,023
Benjamin Miller	37,156
Frank Whetter	31,772
Brook Sykes	28,043
Wesley Benson	25,054
Harry Bradley	2,617

1931 Toronto Board of Control Election
Candidate	Votes
J. George Ramsden	51,043
William D. Robbins	50,801
James Simpson	48,105
Albert Hacker	43,763
John Boland	41,779
Claude Pearce	40,431
W.A. Summerville	19,087
Thomas Foster	13,491
James Cotton	9,014
George King	3,154
Tim Buck	3,010

1932 Toronto Board of Control Election
Candidate	Votes
James Simpson	42,010
J. George Ramsden	38,200
Sam McBride	31,939
William D. Robbins	31,067
Albert Hacker	30,348
Claude Pearce	23,659
James Cotton	6,440
Tim Buck	5,974
Harry Bradley	1,726

1933 Toronto Board of Control Election
Candidate	Votes
J. George Ramsden	55,503
Sam McBride	55,323
James Simpson	54,218
William D. Robbins	48,061
Albert Hacker	37,019
John Boland	36,645
William Miller	18,836
James Cotton	11,871
Alice Buck	10,155
W.J. Haire	3,066
J.H.H. Ballantyne	2,183

1934 Toronto Board of Control Election
Candidate	Votes
Sam McBride	54,855
J. George Ramsden	48,152
James Simpson	47,358
William D. Robbins	37,714
William J. Wadsworth	36,289
Claude Pearce	31,156
Percy Quinn	26,872
Alice Buck	9,767
Harry Bradley	2,623

1935 Toronto Mayoral Election
Candidate	Votes
James Simpson	54,400
Harry W. Hunt	50,986
J. George Ramsden	16,851
A.E. Smith	4,760

January 1936 Toronto Mayoral Election
Candidate	Votes
Sam McBride	48,723
Harry W. Hunt	43,036
James Simpson	32,636
