= John Baird Laidlaw =

Toronto alderman and mayoral candidate

John Baird Laidlaw (March 31, 1866 — August 25, 1953) was an insurance executive and Toronto city councillor who ran unsuccessfully for mayor in 1937.

Laidlaw was a grandson of Franklin Jackes who sat on the last council of York, Upper Canada in 1833 before it was incorporated as the City of Toronto, was a member of Toronto's first city council and a supporter of William Lyon Mackenzie and the Upper Canada Rebellion.

He was educated at Jarvis Collegiate Institute before entering the insurance business. He was general manager of the Canadian and Newfoundland branch of the Norwich Union Fire Insurance Society from 1900 until 1930 when he was appointed Canadian director. From 1917 to 1930 he was also president and director of the Canadian Security Assurance Company.

During World War I he joined the 34th Ontario Regiment and trained as an officer but due to his expertise in insurance, was appointed to the Soldiers' Aid Commission of Ontario rather than being deployed overseas. After the war he joined the citizens' committee responsible for building veterans' clubs in Toronto.

Laidlaw was elected as one of Ward 3's two alderman in the 1934 Toronto municipal election, defeating incumbent alderman John Corcoran to become junior alderman for the ward. He was elected the downtown Toronto ward's senior alderman in the 1935 Toronto municipal election and again in the January 1936 Toronto municipal election. Later in the year, he ran for Mayor of Toronto in the December 1936 Toronto municipal election (with municipal elections shifting from New Year's Day to early December) but was defeated by incumbent mayor William D. Robbins by a margin of more than 50,000 votes.

After leaving politics, Laidlaw became involve with real estate and property owners' associations. In the 1950s, as a director of the Ontario Property Owners' Association, he opposed the Regent Park public housing project, which was Canada's first large-scale public housing development, arguing that the private sector should be encouraged to provide all needed residential housing.

His wife, Berta Fredericka Laidlaw, was a social worker who helped establish several old age homes in Toronto and was also active with the Women's Progressive Conservative Association. She died in 1947. They had two daughters and a son.
