= Ramsden Park =

Park in Toronto, Ontario, Canada

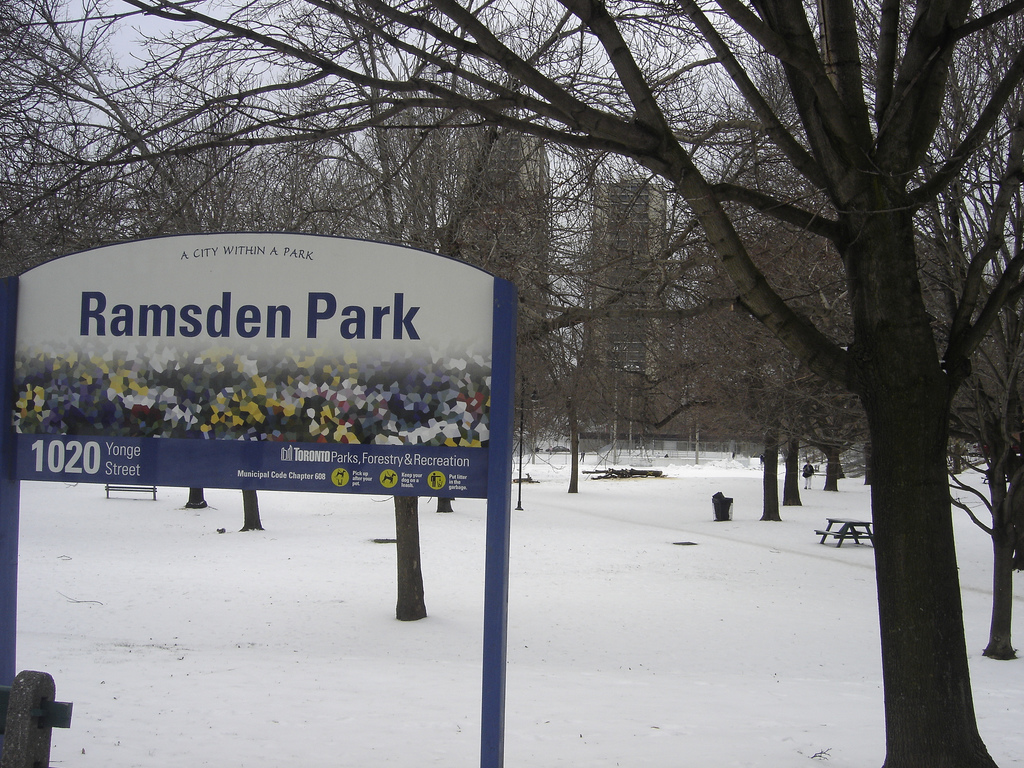

- Location within Toronto
- Type: Public park
- Location: Toronto, Ontario, Canada
- Coordinates: 43°40′35″N 79°23′35″W
- Created: 1904
- Owner: City of Toronto
- Operator: Parks, Forestry & Recreation Division
- Website: Ramsden Park

Ramsden Park is a public park located at 1020 Yonge Street in Toronto, Ontario, Canada, with access via Ramsden Park Road. and Pears Avenue. With an area of 13.7 acres, Ramsden Park is one of the largest in downtown Toronto. It features playgrounds, basketball courts, hockey rinks and a small skateboarding feature.

== History ==
=== Creation ===
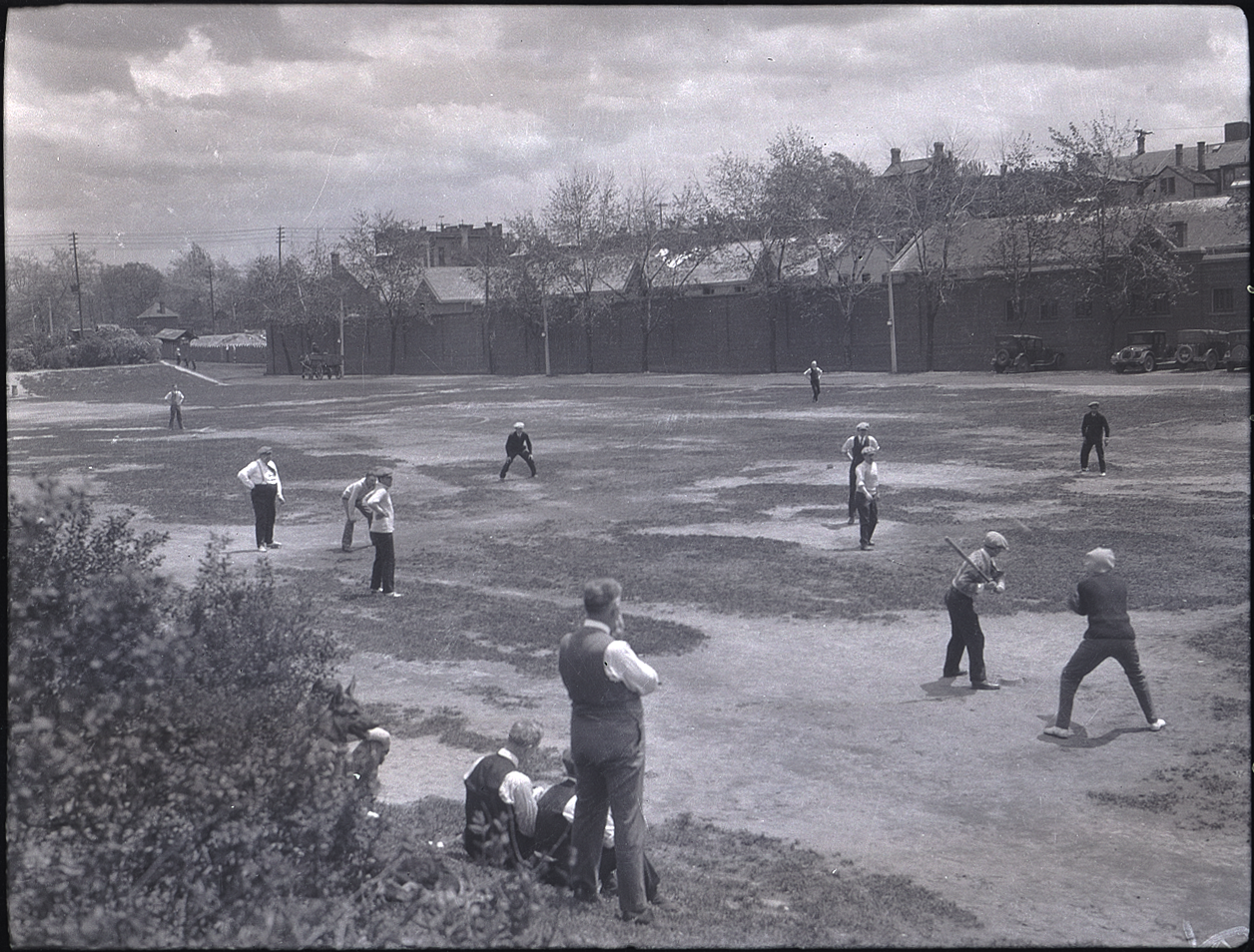
Baseball players in Ramsden Park in Toronto, taken in 1926, from the M.O. Hammond fonds held at the Archives of Ontario.

From the 1840s to the 1890s this was the location of the Yorkville Brick Yards. The yellowish-white bricks produced were used for many buildings in the village and city including Yorkville Town Hall, St. Michael's Cathedral, St. James Cathedral and much of University College. In 1904 the City purchased the land and established a park named after Alderman J. George Ramsden, a local resident who was active in city politics from 1903 until 1936.

=== Revitalization Project ===
Ramsden park is the site of a nearly completed large scale renovation. The revitalization project has added the following features:

- New playground
- Splash-pad features added to wading pool
- Rebuilt tennis courts
- Multi-purpose sports court
- New fenced in dog park
- Various landscaping and cosmetic changes
- New stairs and ramps at all entrances
- Skate Feature by the basketball court
