= Carleton Village =

- Neighbourhood
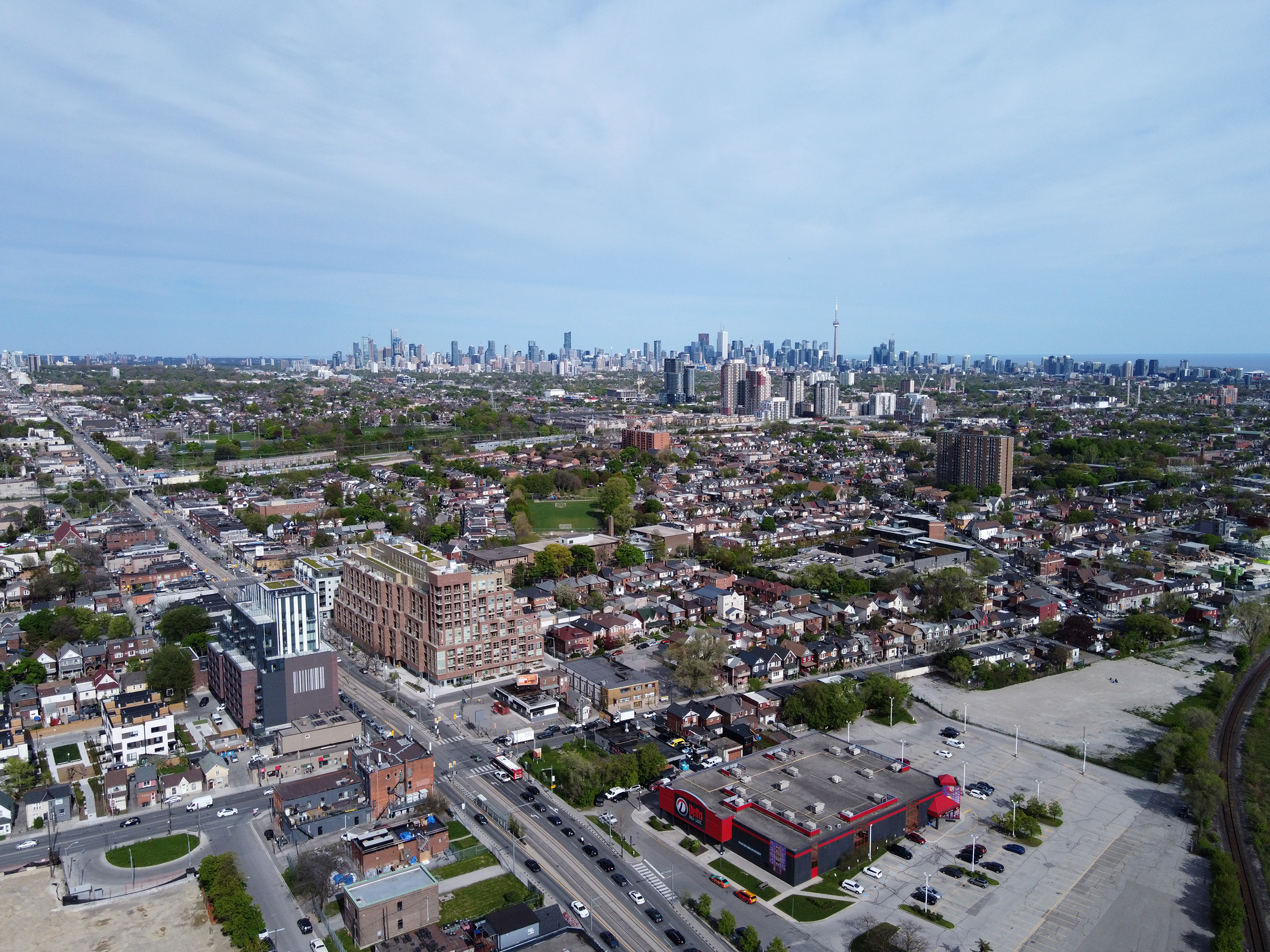
- Aerial view of Carleton Village in 2024

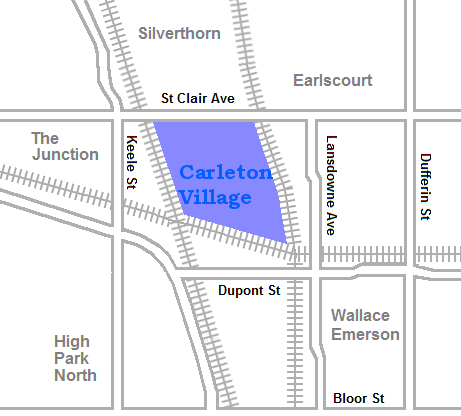
- Neighbourhood map

- Location within Toronto
- Coordinates: 43.672°N 79.457°W
- Country: Canada
- Province: Ontario
- City: Toronto

Government
  - MP: Julie Dzerowicz (Davenport)
  - MPP: Marit Stiles (Davenport)
  - Councillor: Alejandra Bravo (Ward 9)

Carleton Village is a neighbourhood in the city of Toronto, Ontario, Canada. It is centered along Davenport Road, south of St. Clair Avenue West and surrounded on the other three sides by railway lines. The CNR/CPR mainline to the west, the CNR railway lines to the east, and the CPR east–west railway lines to the south.

The at grade crossing of two separate lines is referred to as the Davenport Junction. Metrolinx is working to eliminate this crossing to improve service and safety with a flyover to carry GO Train traffic. The separation will also create green space for residents.

== Character ==
The neighbourhood is an extremely mixed neighbourhood. The residential area is primarily single-family semi-detached homes, occupying the centre of the neighbourhood area. Along all of the rail lines are light industrial areas. Along St. Clair Avenue West is an area of commercial storefronts and service industries, tied together by the St. Clair Gardens Business Improvement Area. The 512 St. Clair streetcar provides transit access through the neighbourhood.

== History ==
=== Carlton and Davenport villages ===
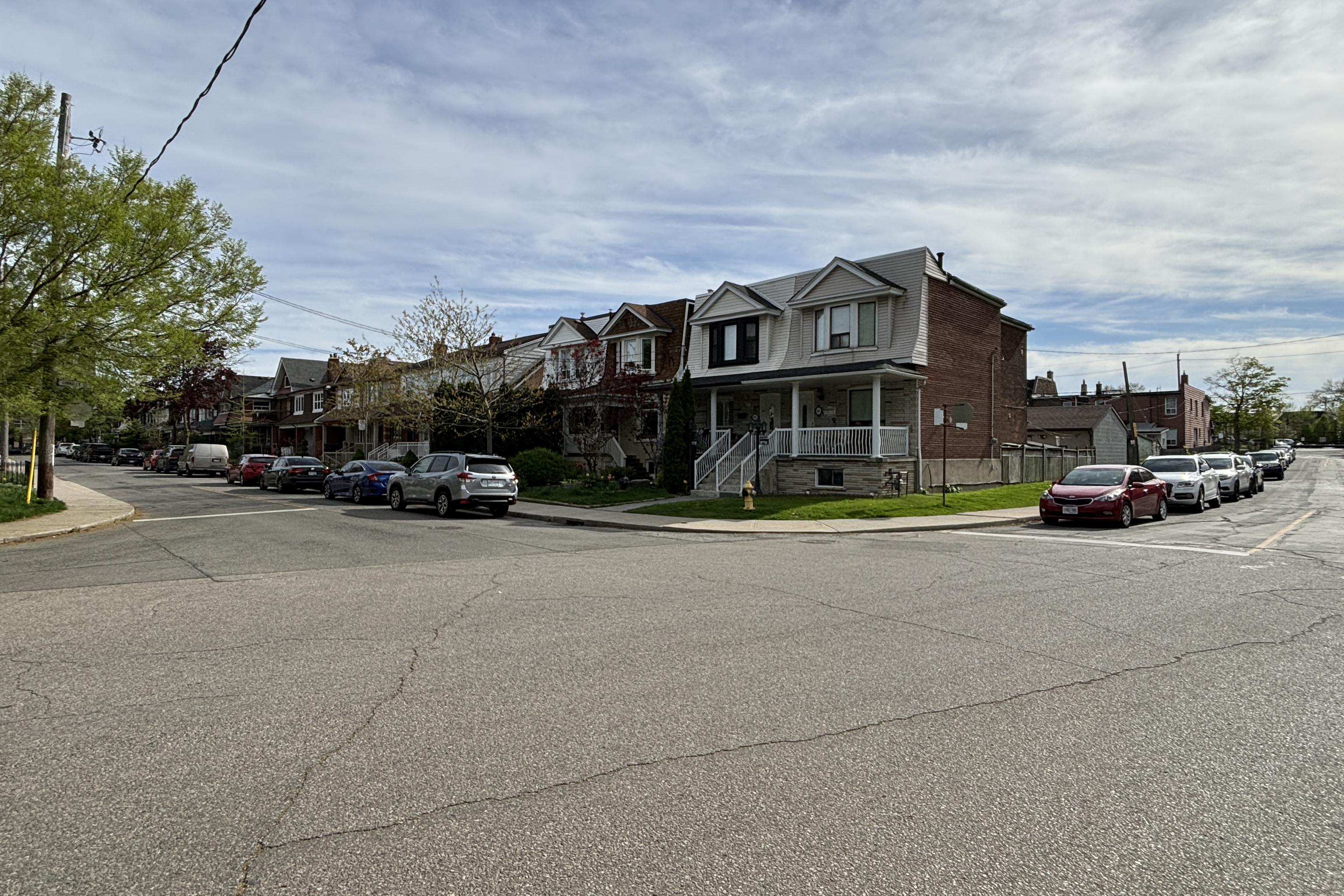
Old houses in Connolly Street

The first European settlement in the area was the village of Carlton, at the intersection of St. Clair Avenue and today's Old Weston Road. Carlton was established in the late 1840s around the carriage and wagon-making shop of William Bull and appears in the 1851 Browne's Map of the Township of York. It was named after governor Guy Carleton. The settlement was not large, consisting of approximately thirty buildings. Carlton railway station was opened in 1857 and Carlton Post Office opened in 1858. By 1865, it was listed as having 150 residents. A new Carlton & Weston Road railway station was built in 1885 on the east side of the CNR tracks. It was renamed West Toronto Station and additions were added in 1902 and 1912. It still stands.

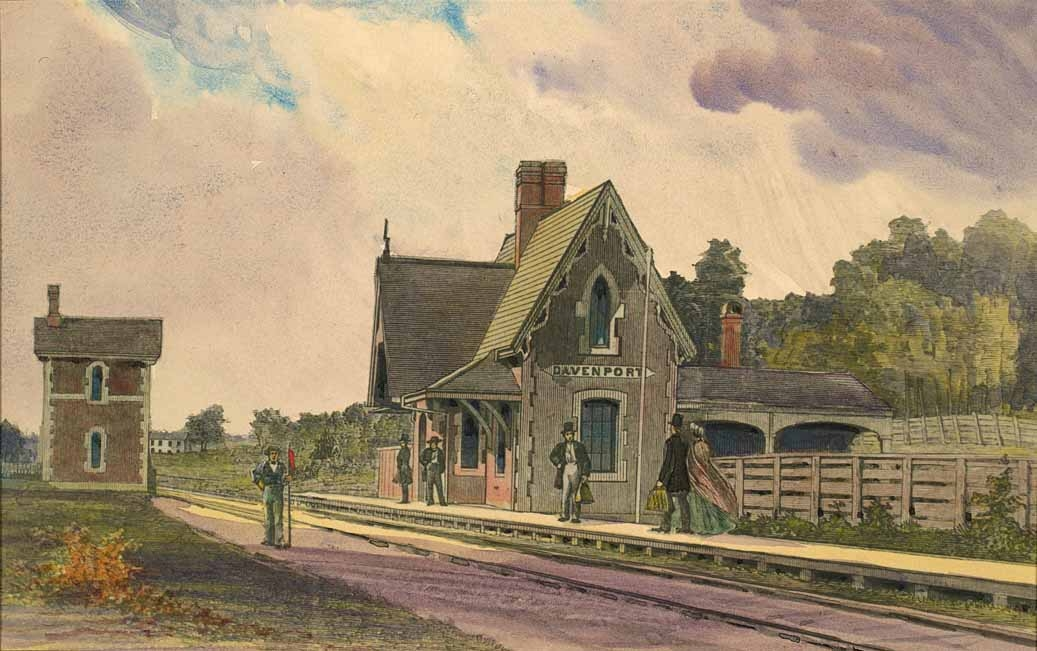
Davenport Station in 1863. The station was a stop on the Northern Railway of Canada.

Along Davenport at today's Perth Avenue, the settlement of Davenport developed. When the Northern Railway line was built, a Davenport Station was built. Davenport was also small, having only a population of 120 by 1875. The two villages grew steadily and more building lots were developed, all getting their water from wells. The neighbouring village of West Toronto Junction was incorporated in 1887. Rather than join the junction, villagers proposed forming a new merged village of 'Stanley', after Lord Stanley the Governor General of Canada at the time. The plan failed and Carlton and Davenport were later annexed into West Toronto Junction in 1889.

Connolly Street in the area was first laid out as Carlton Avenue and renamed when West Toronto was annexed by the City of Toronto in 1909 (likely to avoid confusion with Carlton Street).

At the centre of the neighbourhood is Wadsworth Park, named after long-serving Alderman and Controller William J. Wadsworth.

Most development dates from the era of the building of St. Clair Avenue after the annexation by Toronto.

== Demographics ==
Carleton Village falls within the City of Toronto's "Weston-Pelham Park" neighborhood. According to the 2016 Neighborhood Profile, the median family income is $78,988 (5% below the City average of $82,859).

Census tract 0108.00 of the 2006 Canadian census overlaps exactly with Carleton Village. According to that census, the neighbourhood has 6,544 residents. The ten most common language spoken at home, after English, are:

1. Portuguese - 17.0%
2. Spanish - 5.7%
3. Italian - 4.4%
4. Cantonese - 2.5%
5. Vietnamese - 2.1%
6. Punjabi - 2.0%
7. Unspecified Chinese - 1.7%
8. Hindi - 0.5%
9. Korean - 0.5%
10. Tagalog - 0.4%

== Education ==
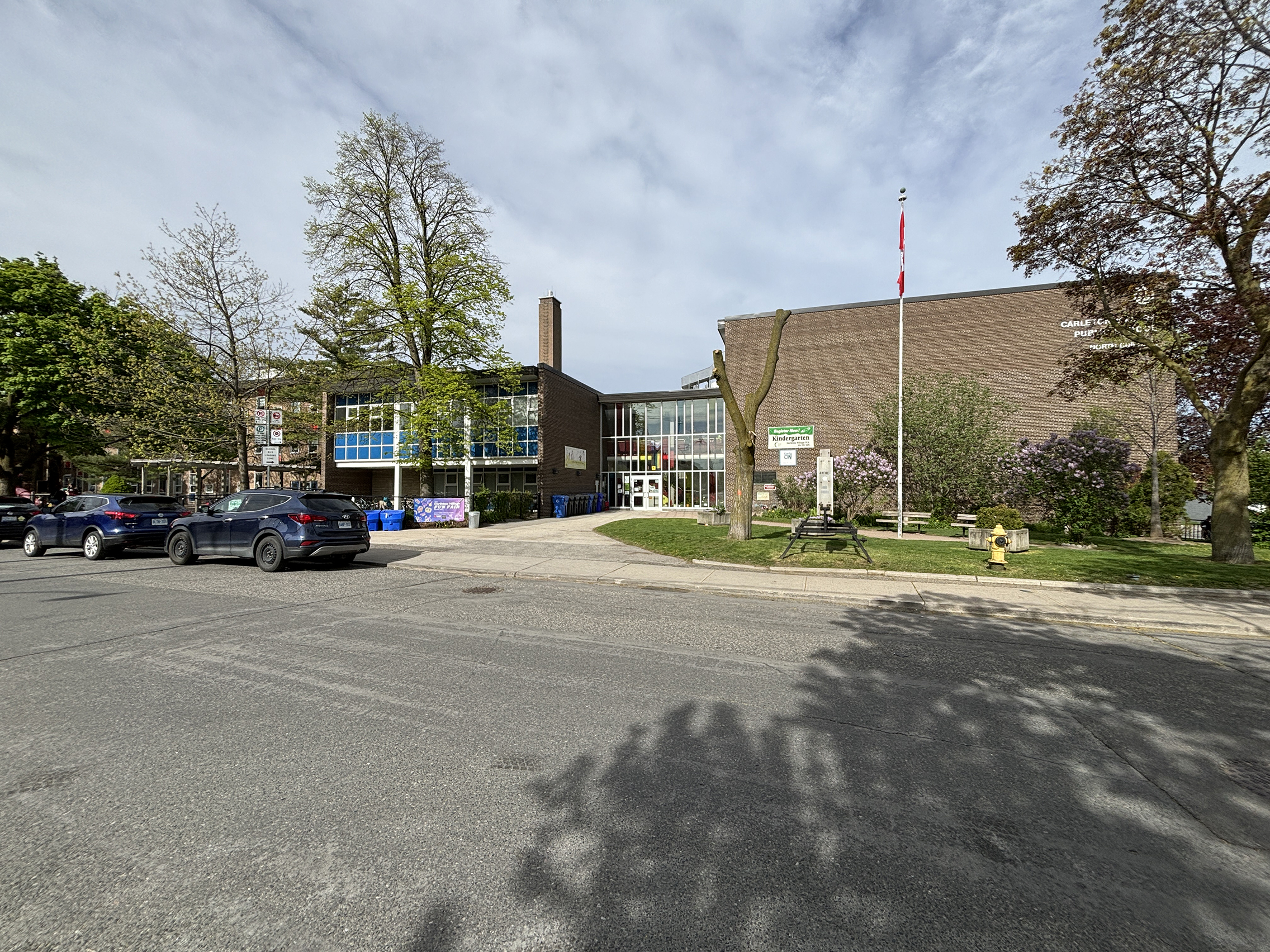
Carleton Village Junior and Senior Sports and Wellness Academy

Three public school boards operate within Carleton Village, the public secular Toronto District School Board (TDSB), and Conseil scolaire Viamonde (CSV), and the public separate Toronto Catholic District School Board. All three school boards operate a public elementary school within the neighbourhood. They include:

- Blessed Pope Paul VI Catholic School (TCDSB)
- Carleton Village Junior and Senior Sports Academy (TDSB)
- École élémentaire Charles-Sauriol (CSV)

Previously, the TCDSB operated Brother Edmund Rice Catholic Secondary School from 1977 to 2001.

In 2001, the south building of the school at 2054 Davenport Road closed. Some efforts were made by the local community to preserve elements of the old building, and as of 2009, early plans to completely demolish the existing structure and erect a new home for the local police division have been significantly altered. The architecture of the 1913 building will be preserved in the new plan for the station, with a contemporary wing replacing the addition from the 1960s.
