= Bert Wemp =

Canadian politician (1889–1976)

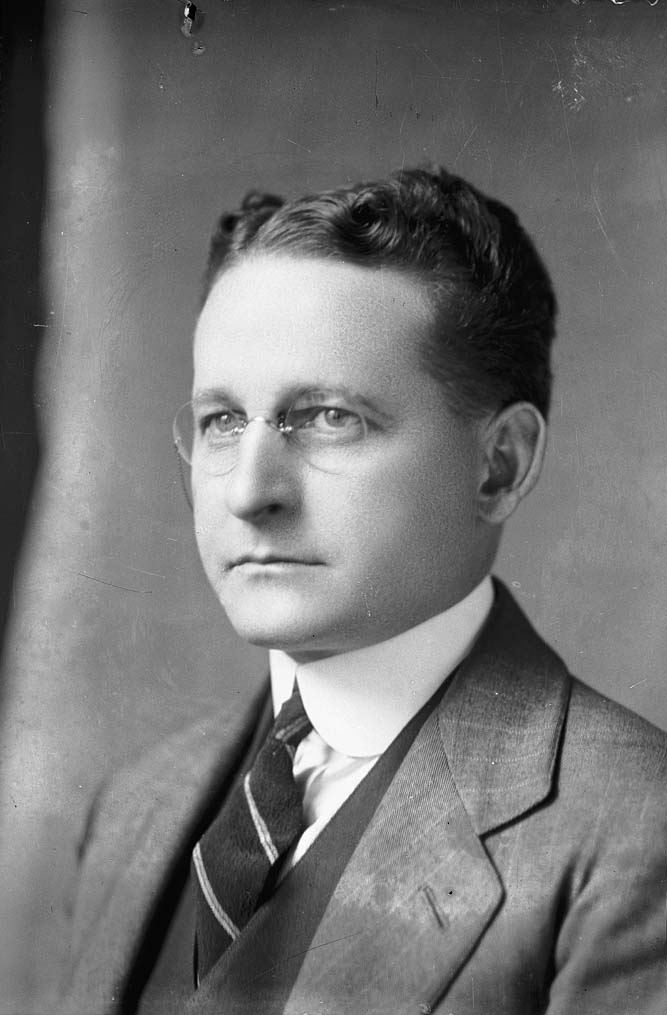

42nd Mayor of Toronto
- In office 1930–1930
- Preceded by: Samuel McBride
- Succeeded by: William James Stewart

Personal details
- Born: Bert Sterling Wemp; July 3, 1889; Tweed, Ontario, Canada
- Died: February 6, 1976 (aged 86); Toronto, Ontario, Canada
- Awards: Distinguished Flying Cross; Order of Leopold

Bert Sterling Wemp (July 3, 1889 – February 5, 1976) was a Canadian journalist and mayor of Toronto. He was also a member of the Orange Order in Canada.

Born in Tweed, Ontario, he was raised in Cabbagetown and attended Dufferin School and Jarvis Collegiate Institute. In 1905, he joined the Toronto Telegram working as a suburban editor, editor, city editor, and head of the court bureau. During World War I, he served as commander of the 218th Squadron, Royal Naval Air Service and was the first Canadian to win the Distinguished Flying Cross. He was made a Knight of the Order of Leopold in 1919. During World War II he was a war correspondent. In 1946, he was made an Officer of the Order of the British Empire.

In 1921, he was elected a school trustee and again in 1922. In 1924, he was elected to the Toronto City Council as an alderman for Ward 2. In 1930, he was elected mayor of Toronto. After serving as mayor, he returned to the Toronto Telegram as city editor. He died of emphysema in 1976.
