= Harry W. Hunt =

Canadian businessman and alderman (1883–1966)

Harry William Hunt (September 14, 1883 – June 10, 1966) was a businessman who was an alderman on Toronto City Council in the 1920s and 1930s and twice ran for Mayor of Toronto in 1935 and 1936.

Hunt was born in Hamilton, Ontario in 1883 and was a factory worker and loan company inspector until opening his own store in 1912. The business became the Hunt Candy Company, a confectionery manufacturer and retail chain, and later Hunt's Ltd. He also owned the Savarin Tavern.

He was first elected alderman for Ward 3 in Toronto's downtown in the 1922 Toronto municipal election. He was defeated in 1923 but returned to office in 1924 and continued as the ward's alderman for until he ran for mayor in 1935. Hunt had earlier announced his candidacy for mayor for the 1931 election but withdrew his nomination in favour of William James Stewart.

A Conservative, he was endorsed for the 1935 election by all of Toronto's newspapers except for the Toronto Daily Star which endorsed socialist James Simpson who was supported by the Co-operative Commonwealth Federation and defeated Hunt by 3,500 votes. Liberal-aligned J. George Ramsden came third. During the election campaign, Hunt warned that the election of a CCF mayor would be a "tragedy" for the city.

Hunt ran again the following year losing to former mayor Sam McBride, with Simpson coming in third place. Hunt attributed his loss to the "Protestant forces" being divided between himself and Mayor Simpson (who, though a socialist, was also vocally anti-Catholic), while the "Catholic vote" supported McBride.

When he died in 1966, he left an estate of over half-a-million dollars.
