= Ralph Day =

46th mayor of Toronto

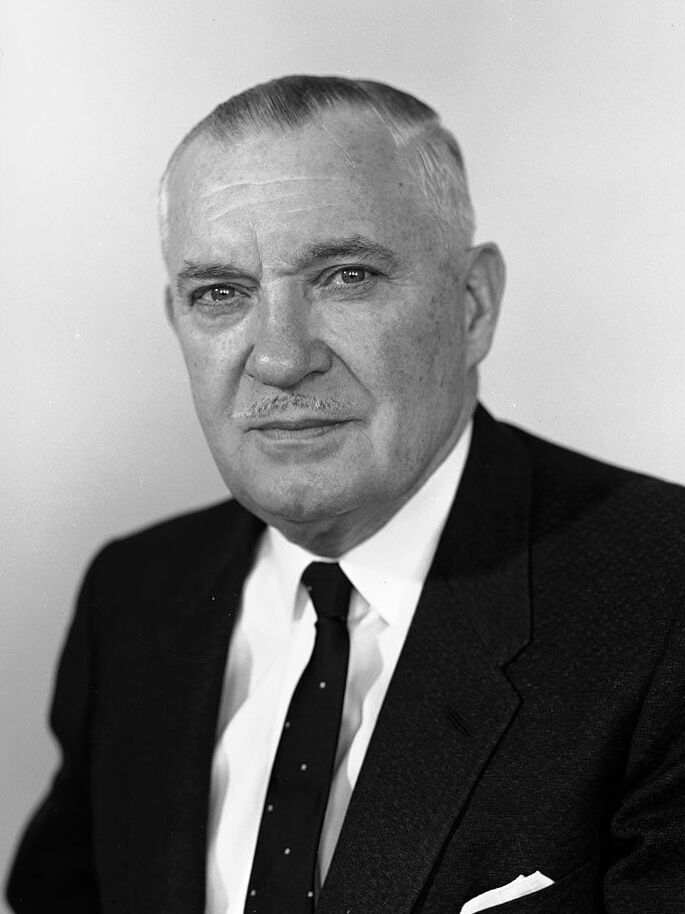
- Day as TTC Chairman, 1963

46th Mayor of Toronto
- In office 1938–1940
- Preceded by: William D. Robbins
- Succeeded by: Frederick J. Conboy

Personal details
- Born: Ralph Carrette Day; November 24, 1898 Toronto, Ontario, Canada
- Died: May 21, 1976 (aged 77) Toronto, Ontario, Canada
- Profession: Mayor of Toronto, First Chairman Parking Authority, Chairman Toronto Transit Commission

Ralph Carrette Day (November 24, 1898 – May 21, 1976) was mayor of Toronto, Ontario from 1938 to 1940. He was also an accomplished funeral director, owning his own funeral home. He also served as chairman of the Toronto Transit Commission in the 1960s and 1970s. He was also a member of the Orange Order in Canada.

In 1916, at the age of 17, Day joined the Canadian army to fight in World War I. He would fight and survive action at the Battle of Vimy Ridge.

Day entered municipal politics in the 1930s, first as an alderman and then as a controller before being elected mayor in 1938 and serving until 1940.

Italian-Canadian men were interned by the federal government shortly after Italy declared war on Canada during World War II; Day announced on June 11, 1940, that their families, despite now lacking a breadwinner, would be denied welfare. "This country is at war with Italy", he stated, "and Italians cannot very well expect us to spend money for war purposes for the purpose of maintaining alien enemies."

In 1952 Day became the first chairman of the new Toronto Parking Authority. He held this position until 1963 when he was named to the Toronto Transit Commission and became its chairman in turn. He held the position with the TTC until 1972.

The Ralph Day Funeral Home still operates but has since merged with another Day family acquisition. "Heritage Funeral Centre, "Ralph Day Chapel" is in Toronto on Overlea Boulevard.

== Irish Sweepstakes ==
In 1949 Day won the equivalent of $100,000 (Canadian) on an Irish Sweepstakes ticket on the horse Russian Hill. Seriously ill at the time with "a blood complaint" resulting from an infected tooth, he described the news as "the best tonic in the world".

== Personal life ==
With his wife Vera, Day had two daughters, Marie and Shirley, and one son, Glen. His son married former mayor Allan A. Lamport's daughter, Edythe Jane Lamport, and had three sons, Glen, Allan, and Andrew.

Political offices
Preceded by C. C. Downey	Chairman of the Toronto Transit Commission; 1963–1972	Succeeded by Franklin I. Young
