= J. George Ramsden =

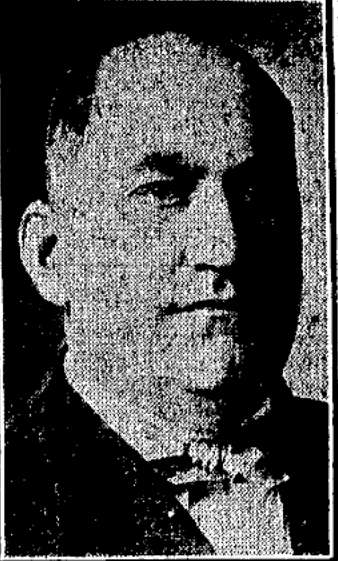
Ramsden in 1915

Joseph George Ramsden (July 3, 1867 to December 28, 1948) was a longtime municipal politician in Toronto, Ontario, Canada, holding elected offices on Toronto city council for 16 years during the 33 year period between 1903 and 1936.

Ramsden was born in Thornhill, Ontario.

== Electoral & public service career ==
Ramsden first became active in politics working for Alexander Mackenzie in a York East election campaign.

=== Toronto City Council ===
After two unsuccessful bids, Ramsden was first elected to Toronto City Council in 1903. (During those years, Toronto held municipal election every year.) He was elected fifteen more times in the following three decades, six of them as a member of the Toronto Board of Control, the city's executive committee. He retired from politics upon the completion of his 1936 term as a city controller.

He was nicknamed the "Watchdog of the Treasury" for his focus on reducing spending whenever possible.

Elections contested by J. George Ramsden - Toronto municipal elections
Year	Office Contested	Seats	Result	Rank	Field
1901	Aldermen for Third Ward (Central Business District & The Ward)	4	No	7th	13
1902	Aldermen for Third Ward (Central Business District & The Ward)	4	No	6th	6
1903	Aldermen for Third Ward (Central Business District & The Ward)	4	Yes	3rd	7
1904	Aldermen for Third Ward (Central Business District & The Ward)	3	Yes	1st	5
1905	Board of Control	4	No	8th	11
1915	Aldermen for Ward 3 (Central Business District & The Ward)	3	Yes	3rd	6
1916	Aldermen for Ward 3 (Central Business District & The Ward)	3	Yes	2nd	4
1917	Aldermen for Ward 3 (Central Business District & The Ward)	3	Yes	2nd	4
1918	Aldermen for Ward 3 (Central Business District & The Ward)	3	Yes	1st	6
1919	Aldermen for Ward 3 (Central Business District & The Ward)	3	Yes	1st	4
1920	Board of Control	4	Yes	4th	8
1921	Board of Control	4	No	7th	8
1922	Board of Control	4	No	7th	9
1924	Aldermen for Ward 3 (Central Business District & The Ward)	3	No	4th	7
1925	Aldermen for Ward 3 (Central Business District & The Ward)	3	Yes	2nd	7
1926	Aldermen for Ward 3 (Central Business District & The Ward)	3	Yes	2nd	5
1927	Board of Control	4	No	5nd	8
1930	Aldermen for Ward 3 (Central Business District)	3	Yes	1st	6
1931	Board of Control	4	Yes	1st	11
1932	Board of Control	4	Yes	2nd	9
1933	Board of Control	4	Yes	1st	11
1934	Board of Control	4	Yes	2nd	9
1935	Mayor	1	No	3rd	4
1936	Board of Control	4	Yes	3rd	8

For the 1931 and 1932 terms, Ramsden was designated by Mayor William James Stewart as the vice-chair for the Board of Control. For the 1934 term, Ramsden was appointed President, the designated deputy of Mayor William James Stewart.

Having served 15 terms over the previous 30 years, Ramsden announced on his 67th birthday his mayoral bid for the 1935 term. While the contest was notable for the city political history, Ramsden was however not in serious contention. The contest was between Ramsden's fellow controller James Simpson's bid to became the city's first mayor from a leftist party (as a member of Co-operative Commonwealth Federation), and conservative Harry W. Hunt's campaign backed by the traditional establishment to stop Simpson.

1935 Toronto Mayoral Election
Known partisan affiliation	Candidate	Votes	%
Co-operative Commonwealth	James Simpson	54,400	42.84
Conservative	Harry W. Hunt	50,986	40.15
Liberal	J. George Ramsden	16,851	13.27
Communist	A. E. Smith	4,760	3.75
Total valid votes		126,997	

=== Department of Indian Affairs ===
Following his unsuccessful 1905 bid to become one of Toronto's four controllers, Ramsden was appointed by the federal Liberal government in 1906 as the Inspector for Treaty No. 9, commonly known as the James Bay Treaty. The order-in-council appointment was one with significant authority and required him to formally reside in Ottawa thus kept him from reoffering as a municipal candidate in the following decade. The treaty was negotiated between the federal and Ontario governments and numerous Cree and Ojibwe (Anishinaabe) communities in Northern Ontario between 1905 and 1906, covering more than a third of Ontario's modern geography, much of it was not incorporated into the province by that time. The role entailed extensive travel to the indigenous communities that were party to the treaty. He was later assigned additional responsibilities for some of the areas covered by the Robinson Huron Treaty. He was promoted to be the Chief Inspector for the Department of Indian Affairs in 1910. Ramsden's service to the Department of Indian Affairs ended in May 1912, about six months after the end of the Laurier ministry.

=== Loyal Liberal Partisan ===
He was a known Liberal partisan in a city whose politics were then dominated by the Tories. In the 1917 "conscription" election during which many prominent Liberals deserted the party, Ramsden stood as the "Laurier Liberal" candidate in Toronto Centre against three-term incumbent Edmund Bristol, a prominent MP who was also the Conservative provincial party president. The Liberals won only eight seats in Ontario and suffered heavy losses across English Canada. With only 24% of the local votes Ramsden was beaten by Bristol by a 50 pts margin, the worst ever results for Liberal candidates in Toronto Centre.

1917 Canadian federal election
Party	Candidate	Votes	%	±%
Government (Unionist)	Edmund Bristol	12,051	74.45	+11.19
Opposition (Laurier Liberals)	J. George Ramsden	3,918	24.21	-12.53
Unknown	Archie Dramin	217	1.34	
Total valid votes		16,186	100.00	

Ramsden received some consolation for his defeat soon after, when his 27 year old eldest son Captain John Carman Ramsden, a World War I veteran and Military Cross recipient, was elected as the Liberal MPP for Toronto Southwest along with Liberal leader Hartley Dewart in the 1919 provincial election.

The United Farmer Duruy ministry swept into power by the 1919 election appointed Ramsden and cabinet member Dougall Carmichael as two of the three commissioners of the Ontario Hydro-Electric Commission to serve alongside Sir Adam Beck, the commission's inaugural chair appointed while a Conservative cabinet minister and had lost his seat in the recent election. Ramsden was the first commissioner appointed who had not served as a MPP and was appointed to be the necessary tiebreaking vote to keep Beck in line. He was removed when the Conservative return to government, and the partisan nature of Ramsden's appointment became fodder of debate when Beck's fiscal management was scrutinized.

== Legacy ==
Ramsden Park in Toronto, located at 1020 Yonge Street just north of Davenport, is named in his honour.
