= William James Stewart =

Canadian politician

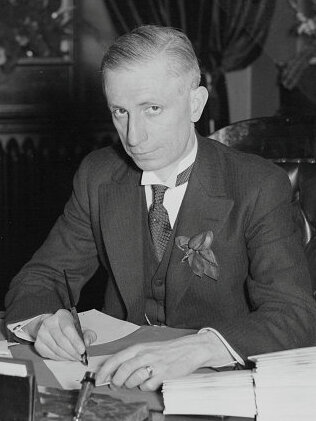
- Stewart, c. 1931

Ontario MPP
- In office 1951–1959
- Preceded by: Lloyd F. K. Fell
- Succeeded by: James Beecham Trotter
- Constituency: Parkdale
- In office 1938–1948
- Preceded by: Frederick George McBrien
- Succeeded by: Lloyd F. K. Fell
- Constituency: Parkdale

43rd Mayor of Toronto
- In office 1931–1934
- Preceded by: Bert Wemp
- Succeeded by: James Simpson
- Constituency: Old City of Toronto

Personal details
- Born: February 13, 1889 Toronto, Ontario
- Died: September 28, 1969 (aged 80) Toronto, Ontario
- Political party: Progressive Conservative
- Occupation: Funeral home director

William James Stewart CBE (February 13, 1889 – September 28, 1969) was a Canadian politician. He was also a member of the Orange Order in Canada. Stewart also owned and operated the Bates and Dodds Funeral Home on Queen Street West in Toronto.

== Early life ==
He was born in Toronto and first worked as an office boy at a bicycle shop. His education largely consisted of evening courses taken at Shaw Business School in Toronto.

== Political life ==
=== Mayor of Toronto ===
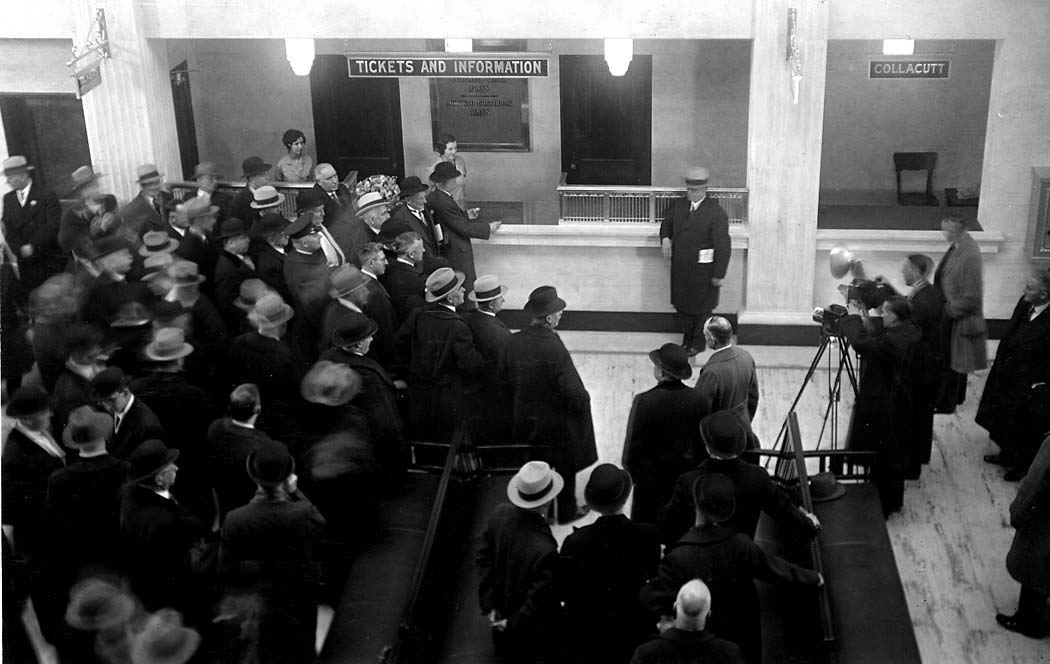
Stewart at the opening of the Toronto Coach Terminal in 1931

Stewart was alderman for Ward 5 in Toronto from 1924 to 1931. He defeated former mayor Sam McBride, who was attempting to return to office, in the 1931 mayoral election and served as Mayor of Toronto from 1931 until 1934. Stewart was the first mayor to use regular radio broadcasts to keep Toronto citizens informed. He also pushed for the restoration of Fort York, which was re-opened in 1934. He entered provincial politics in 1936 when he ran for the leadership of the Ontario Conservative Party. He came in third place behind Earl Rowe and George Drew. He was elected in a by-election on October 5, 1938, as Conservative Member of the Legislative Assembly of Ontario for Parkdale in Toronto's west end.

Stewart also owned and operated the Bates And Dodds Funeral Home at 931 Queen Street West at Strachan Avenue

=== Speaker of the Legislative Assembly ===
Following the 1943 election that brought George Drew's Tories to power, Stewart became Speaker of the legislature, a difficult task as the Progressive Conservatives (as they were known by then) had only a minority government. He was reappointed Speaker following the 1945 election until he suddenly resigned in March 1947 to become a backbench Member of Provincial Parliament (MPP). Farquhar Oliver, leader of the Ontario Liberal Party, introduced a motion that the assembly refuse to accept the resignation of Stewart but this motion was ruled out of order.

== Backbencher and committee member ==
Stewart became a backbencher and went on to serve on various committees, serving as Chairman of the Select Committee on Reform Institutions from 1953 to 1955. Stewart served until 1948 when he lost to CCF candidate Lloyd Fell. He regained his seat in the 1951 provincial election. He remained a member of the legislature until the 1959 election when his Parkdale seat was won by Liberal James Trotter and he left politics.

== Life after politics ==
He served briefly as a member of the Ontario Parole Board in 1960 but found the position too strenuous. Stewart was named chairman of the Toronto Historical Board the following year. He died in Toronto eight years later.

The Stewart Building on College Street bears his name.

== Family connection ==
Stewart is the uncle of former Toronto Fire Services Chief William Albert Stewart and brother to Thomas Beamish Stewart.
