= Percy Quinn =

Canadian politician

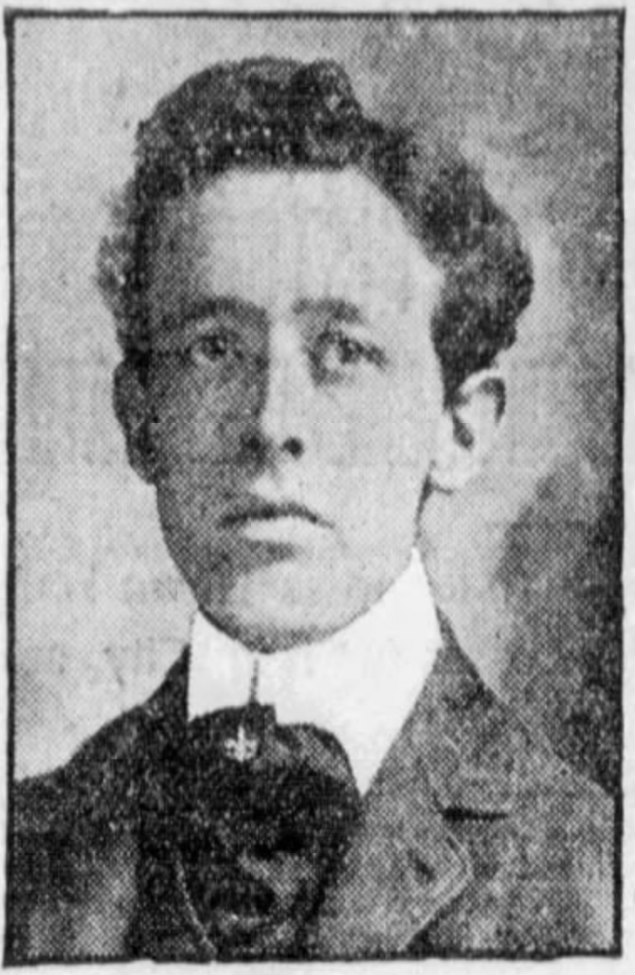
- Quinn circa 1906
- Born: January 9, 1876; Montreal, Quebec, Canada
- Died: October 28, 1944 (aged 68); Toronto, Ontario, Canada
- Occupation: Toronto City Council alderman
- Known for: Ice hockey executive

John Purcell Quinn (January 9, 1876 – October 28, 1944) was a Canadian athlete, businessman, sports executive and politician. He was an owner and president of the Toronto Blueshirts, winners of the Stanley Cup in 1914. He was a member of the world champion Montreal Shamrocks lacrosse team in 1896. From 1927 to 1932 and from 1937 to 1942, he served as alderman on Toronto City Council. His brother Emmett Quinn was also an ice hockey executive.

== Personal life ==
Born in Montreal, Quinn had three brothers: Emmett, Fred and Raphael. Quinn played hockey and lacrosse as a youth. He joined Queen Insurance at the age of 14 and was transferred to Winnipeg in 1902. He became local manager of the renamed Royal Insurance office in Toronto in 1906. Because of ill health after a heart attack in 1942, he lived in Toronto until his death in 1944. He married Louise Reeves. Quinn did not have any children.

== Ice hockey ==
Quinn was first involved in hockey as a coach and a referee in the early 1900s. He was referee of the Stanley Cup challenge series between the Winnipeg Victorias and the Montreal Hockey Club in 1903. When professional hockey was just beginning, Quinn was the owner and manager of the first professional ice hockey team in Toronto, the Toronto Professional Hockey Club, which operated from 1906 to 1909. In 1911, he, along with Frank Robinson and other investors, purchased a franchise in the National Hockey Association (NHA) to play in the new Arena Gardens of Toronto as the Toronto Blueshirts. The arena was not ready for the 1911–12 season, and the team began play in 1912–13. In only its second season, the Blueshirts would win the NHA championship and the Stanley Cup. Quinn sold his share of the Blueshirts, turning the club over to Eddie Livingstone. Quinn and Livingstone knew each other from managing the Toronto Amateur Athletic Club's ice hockey team in previous years.

In 1918, Livingstone and Quinn would team up against the owners of the NHA, now operating as the National Hockey League (NHL). Together, they attempted to overthrow the NHL and resurrect the NHA but were unsuccessful as the rinks were controlled by the NHL or its partners. Quinn bought an option for the dormant Quebec city franchise of the NHA/NHL and was named a director of the NHL. However, the franchise option was bought only to provide a Quebec club for the resurrected NHA league or a new league. When the NHA plan failed and Quinn did not commit to operating the team in the NHL, the franchise was transferred to Mike Quinn (no relation) of Quebec City. The franchise operated as the Quebec Athletics in the 1919–20 season and then moved to Hamilton, Ontario.

In 1920, Quinn became managing director of the Arena Gardens. In this position, he along with Livingstone attempted again to form a new league, one that would have two teams in Toronto, one in Hamilton and one possibly in the United States; either in Boston, Cleveland or Detroit. However, the Arena was placed into bankruptcy and Quinn was replaced by a receiver. The NHL placed the Quebec team in Hamilton to counter the threat. The NHL would eventually expand to Boston and Detroit in the 1920s.

== Lacrosse ==
Quinn was a member of the Montreal Shamrocks team that won the world championship in 1896. He later was president of the Winnipeg Lacrosse Club and president of the Dominion Lacrosse Association.

== Politician ==
Quinn became a city councillor for the City of Toronto in 1927. As a politician, he acted in humanitarian causes to improve life in Toronto. He is credited with getting Toronto public libraries open on Sundays. He worked to improve conditions in the Toronto Don Jail.

== See also ==
- 1918–19 NHL season
- 1913–14 NHA season
