= Sam McBride =

Canadian lumberman and politician (1866–1936)

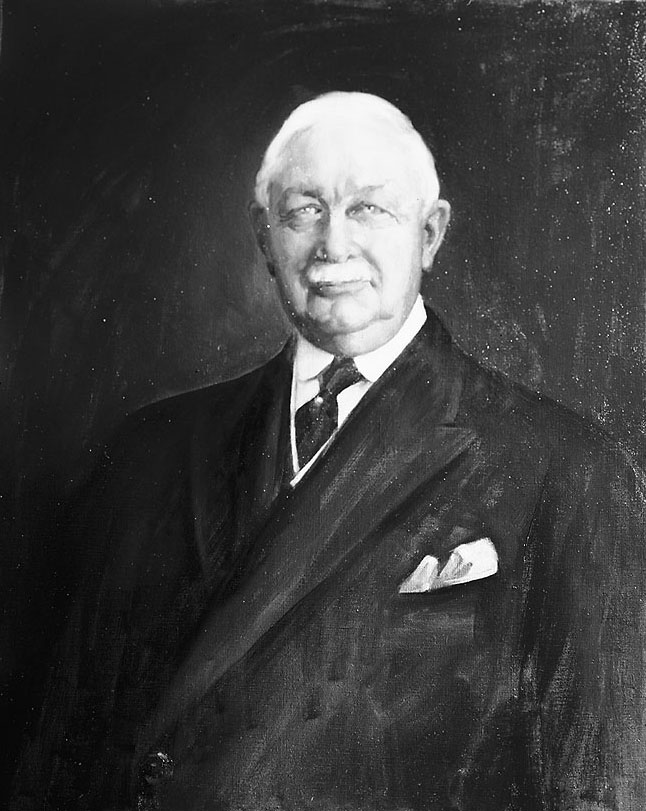
- McBride painting by John Russell, 1937

41st Mayor of Toronto
- In office 1928–1929
- Preceded by: Thomas Foster
- Succeeded by: Bert Wemp
- In office 1936–1936
- Preceded by: James Simpson
- Succeeded by: William D. Robbins

Personal details
- Born: Samuel McBride; July 13, 1866 Toronto, Canada West
- Died: November 14, 1936 (aged 70) Toronto, Ontario, Canada
- Profession: businessman (lumber industry)

Samuel McBride (July 13, 1866 – November 14, 1936) was a two-time Mayor of Toronto serving his first term from 1928 to 1929 and his second term in 1936 until his premature death. He was also a member of the Orange Order in Canada.

== Politics ==
He was born in Toronto to an Irish Protestant family (his grandfather came from County Antrim) and was a committed Orangeman. He made his fortune in the lumber industry. He became an alderman in 1905 and served on Toronto City Council for 30 years. He lived at 351 Palmerston Boulevard and on the Toronto Island.

He ran unsuccessfully for mayor three times before being elected in the 1928 election, defeating incumbent Thomas Foster. He was then defeated by Bert Wemp in the 1930 election. He returned to the mayor's office in the 1936 election defeating incumbent James Simpson and former alderman Harry W. Hunt.

Among his accomplishments are helping to create the Toronto Transit Commission, building the Coliseum at the Canadian National Exhibition and overseeing early development of the city's waterfront. He was considered a candidate of the workers and was supported by the left-leaning Toronto Daily Star and opposed by the more conservative Toronto Telegram during his time in politics. On city council he was one of the main proponents of an eight-hour work day and giving women the vote.

He served for many years on the city's police commission. Professor Michiel Horn of York University attributes the Commission's decision to ban all public meetings held in languages other than English to McBride and his concern about Jewish trade union and socialist organizers holding meetings in Yiddish in Toronto's Garment District. "Like all mayors at that time", says Horn, "McBride was strongly pro-British and anti-communist."

== Harness racing ==
McBride was also a harness racing enthusiast and was a founding member and charter director of the Canadian Standardbred Horse Society in 1909 and served as the society's president in 1919 and 1920. He was also a founding director of the Canadian National Trotting and Pacing Harness Horse Association. In 1907, McBride drove his King Bryson to a world record of 2:19½ for trotters over a half-mile track on ice at Plattsburgh, New York.

== Toronto Island ==
McBride had a cottage on the Toronto Island and represented the Island as its Alderman. Nathan Phillips recalled that as an alderman, McBride had a terrible temper. He once got into a fist fight with a fellow alderman and once threw a can of beans at alderman Joe Beamish, missing Beamish, but leaving a dent in the panelling of the council chamber. In 1935, he was instrumental in stopping the building of a tunnel to the Toronto Island that was intended to facilitate an Island Airport. After his death, the City built the Island Airport, without a tunnel, served by ferries until a pedestrian tunnel was opened in 2015.

In recognition of his service to the Toronto Island community, one of the ferries operating from downtown Toronto to the Toronto Island was named after him in 1939, and is still in service as of 2013.

== Death ==
McBride died on 14 Nov 1936, the first Toronto mayor to die in office. McBride's body was placed at the base of the staircase at City Hall for visitations.

He is buried in Mount Pleasant Cemetery, Toronto. He was 70 years old.
