= East Toronto =

Former municipality in Toronto, Canada

Coordinates: 43.6808°N 79.2944°W

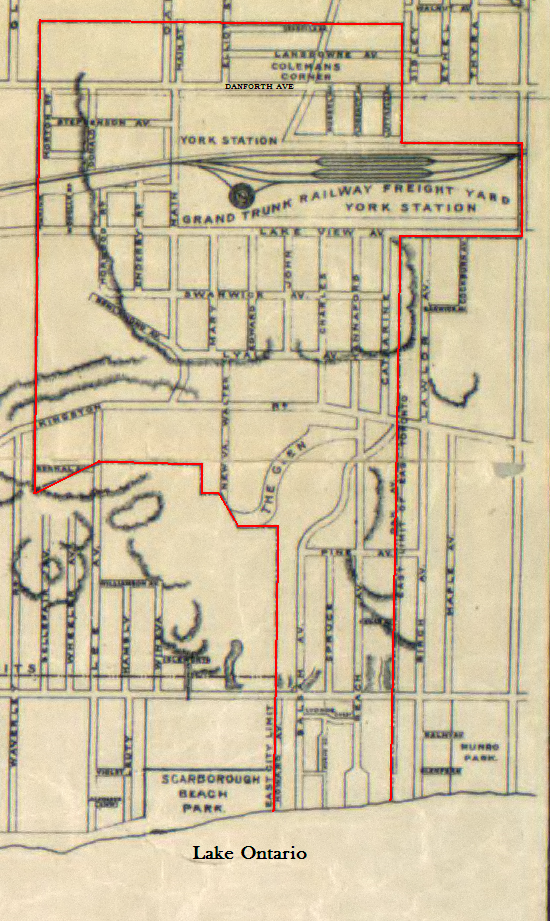
Map of East Toronto in 1908, just prior to being annexed to Toronto

East Toronto is a former municipality, located within the current boundaries of Toronto, Ontario, Canada. It covered much of the present-day neighbourhood of the Upper Beaches, stretching up to Danforth Avenue in the north, part of it stretching to Lake Ontario in the south a portion of the present-day neighbourhood, The Beaches. The central street in East Toronto was Main Street, running between Danforth Avenue to Kingston Road. The commercial centre of the town was located at the intersection of Main Street and Lake View Avenue (present-day Gerrard Street). Following the annexation of East Toronto into Toronto, Main Street retained its name despite Toronto's conceptual Main Street being historically designated to be Yonge Street.

== History ==
The area, after being colonized by British settlers, was occupied in about 1850, when it was a considerable distance from the city of Toronto. It was incorporated as a village in 1888 when about 800 people were living in the area. In the 1901 Census of Canada, East Toronto's population was recorded at 1,564. The area began to grow rapidly and in 1903 it was elevated from a village to a town. The southern part of the community by the lake became one of Toronto's most popular travel destinations and became home to hotels and amusement parks. The northern section, by contrast, was an industrial centre, home to the Grand Trunk Railway's main yards. These facilities stretched along most of Gerrard Street and employed several hundred workers.

When East Toronto was annexed to city of Toronto in 1908 it had a population of about 4,800 people. The CN freight yards closed down in that same year of 1908 and relocated to Belleville and Etobicoke, a move that forced the area into a transition from a railway-based small town into a commuter-based neighbourhood within a city. The trunk yards themselves were essentially abandoned for over 90 years until a housing development was built on most of the land they once occupied.

Today East Toronto commonly refers to the area east of the Don River. This includes neighbourhoods such as Upper Beaches, Riverdale, Leslieville, East Danforth, and the Beaches.

== Street name changes ==
With the annexation by the city of Toronto in 1908, many East Toronto street names were changed, as the city of Toronto already had streets by those names. The following tables show the changes made, with the names of changed streets in bold text.

=== North/south streets ===
Street names
Pre-annexation	Present
**Oak Avenue**	Willow Avenue
**Beach Avenue**	Beech Avenue
Balsam Avenue	Balsam Avenue
**Spruce Avenue**	Spruce Hill Road
**Howard Avenue**	MacLean Avenue (between Lake Front and Queen only)
**Catherine Street**	Pickering Street
Hannaford Street	Hannaford Street
**Charles Street**	Malvern Avenue
**John Street**	Wayland Avenue
**Edward Street**	Osborne Avenue
Walter Street	Walter Street
**Mary Street**	Kimberley Avenue
Main Street	Main Street
Enderby Road	Enderby Road
Norwood Road	Norwood Road
Lee Avenue	Lee Avenue
Woodlee Road	Woodlee Road
**Elliot Street**	Barrington Avenue
**Donald Street**	Westlake Avenue (south of The Danforth only)
Morton Road	Morton Road

The following north/south streets were outside the village limits of East Toronto, but were included in the annexation, and had their street names changed.

Street names
Pre-annexation	Present
Birch Avenue	Silver Birch Avenue
Maple Avenue	Scarborough Road (between Queen and Kingston only)
Cockburn Avenue	Scarborough Road (between Swanwick and Gerrard only)
Reid Avenue	Rhodes Avenue
Erie Terrace	Craven Road
Morley Avenue	Woodfield Road

=== East/west streets ===
Street names
Pre-annexation	Present
Queen Street	Queen Street East
Cedar Avenue	Cedar Avenue
Pine Avenue	Pine Avenue
Kingston Road	Kingston Road
Lyall Avenue	Lyall Avenue
Benlamond Avenue	Benlamond Avenue
Swanwick Avenue	Swanwick Avenue (between Enderby and Pickering only)
**Lake View Avenue**	Gerrard Street East
Stephenson Avenue	Stephenson Avenue
Danforth Avenue	Danforth Avenue
**Lansdowne Avenue**	Coleman Avenue

The following east/west streets were outside the village limits of East Toronto, but were included in the annexation. Streets that had their names changed are in bold text.

Street names
Pre-annexation	Present
Glenfern Avenue	Glenfern Avenue
Balmy Avenue	Balmy Avenue
**Barwick Avenue**	Swanwick Avenue (between Lawlor and Scarborough only)
