= Davenport, Toronto =

Davenport
- Neighbourhood
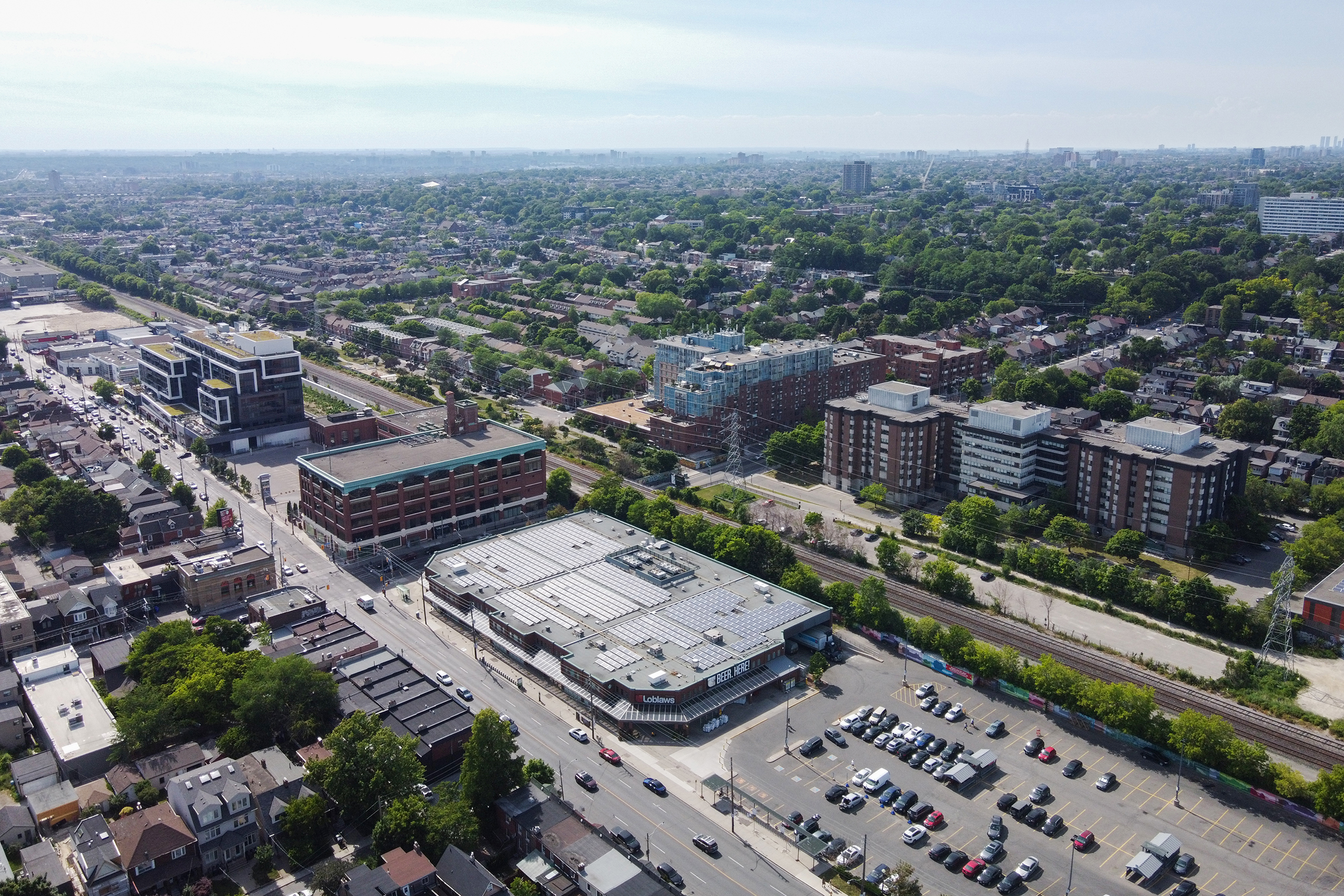
- Aerial view of the residential buildings in Davenport (2022)

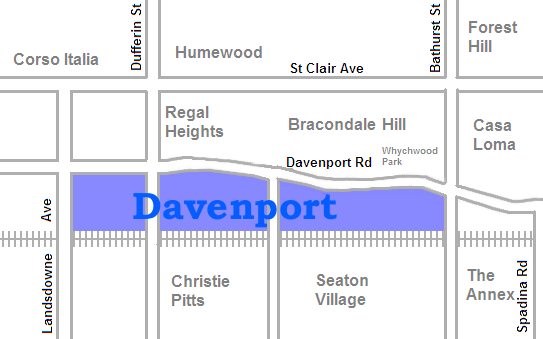

- Location within Toronto
- Coordinates: 43.673°N 79.428°W
- Country: Canada
- Province: Ontario
- City: Toronto

Government
  - Councillor: Alejandra Bravo
  - MP: Julie Dzerowicz (Liberal)
  - MPP: Marit Stiles (New Democratic)
- Time zone: UTC−05:00 (EST)
  - Summer (DST): UTC−04:00 (EDT)

Davenport is a Toronto neighbourhood northwest of downtown Toronto, Ontario, Canada. It is north of the Canadian Pacific Railway tracks and Dupont Avenue and south of Davenport Road and the ridge that is the former Lake Iroquois coastline. Its eastern boundary is Bathurst Street and it stretches west to Lansdowne Avenue. It is contained within the larger city-recognized neighbourhood of Corso Italia-Davenport.

The neighbourhood of Toronto lends its name to federal electoral, provincial electoral districts and Ward 9 Davenport, a municipal Electoral district that cover it and a number of neighbouring areas.

== History ==
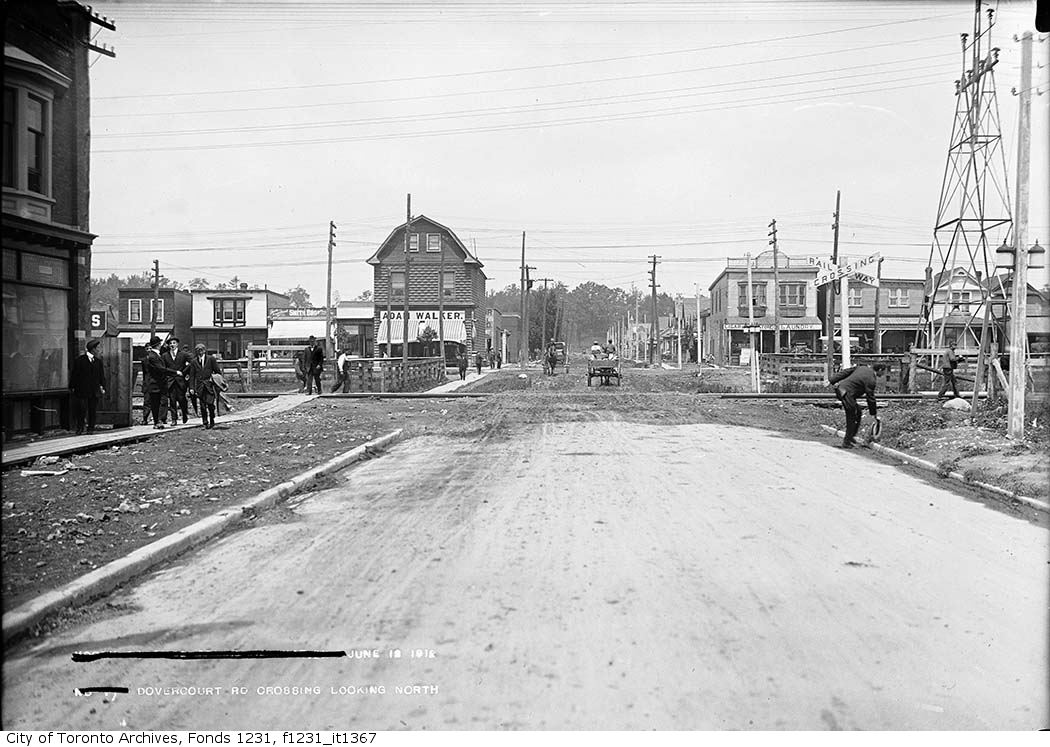
Davenport from Dovercourt Road, south of Geary Avenue (c. 1912). During this period, the area was primarily made up of small plants and factories along the railway tracks.

Davenport Road follows a centuries-old carrying trail the First Nations peoples used to travel the route south of the ridge. It was also an important route by the early European settlers to the region and the area that is today Davenport became home to small farms in the early 19th century. One of the first settlers was Ensign John McGill, who built a home he named Davenport in 1797. This was named after Major Davenport, another local officer, and is the origin of the area's name (the name Davenport is of Norman French origin: Dauen-port meaning "the town on the trickling stream").

In 1861 the Northern Railway ran a rail line to the south of Davenport Road and built a station in the area which they named Davenport. A small village, also named Davenport, grew up around the station. In 1889 the village merged with the nearby Carleton Village and West Toronto Junction to form the town of Toronto Junction. In 1909 this was annexed to the city of Toronto itself. Like the rest of the area known as The Junction in the early 20th century the presence of the railway led to the industrialization of the area and many small plants and factories were set up in the area along the tracks. The residential areas to the north became home to the working class population that worked there, especially Italian Canadians, who dominated the neighbourhood and the nearby Corso Italia by the 1950s. It today remains home to many Italian and Portuguese residents, but since the departure of most of the factories in the 1970s and 1980s the area has been somewhat gentrified taking on some of the characteristics of nearby areas like the Annex. New townhouse developments have been built in the area replacing former factories and warehouses.

Today, the neighborhood is largely Portuguese with sizable Italian, Latin American, British, and Chinese populations.

== Landmarks ==
- Tollkeeper's Cottage (built c.1830)
- Garrison Creek
