= Fashion District, Toronto =

Coordinates: 43.645°N 79.398°W

Fashion District
- Neighbourhood
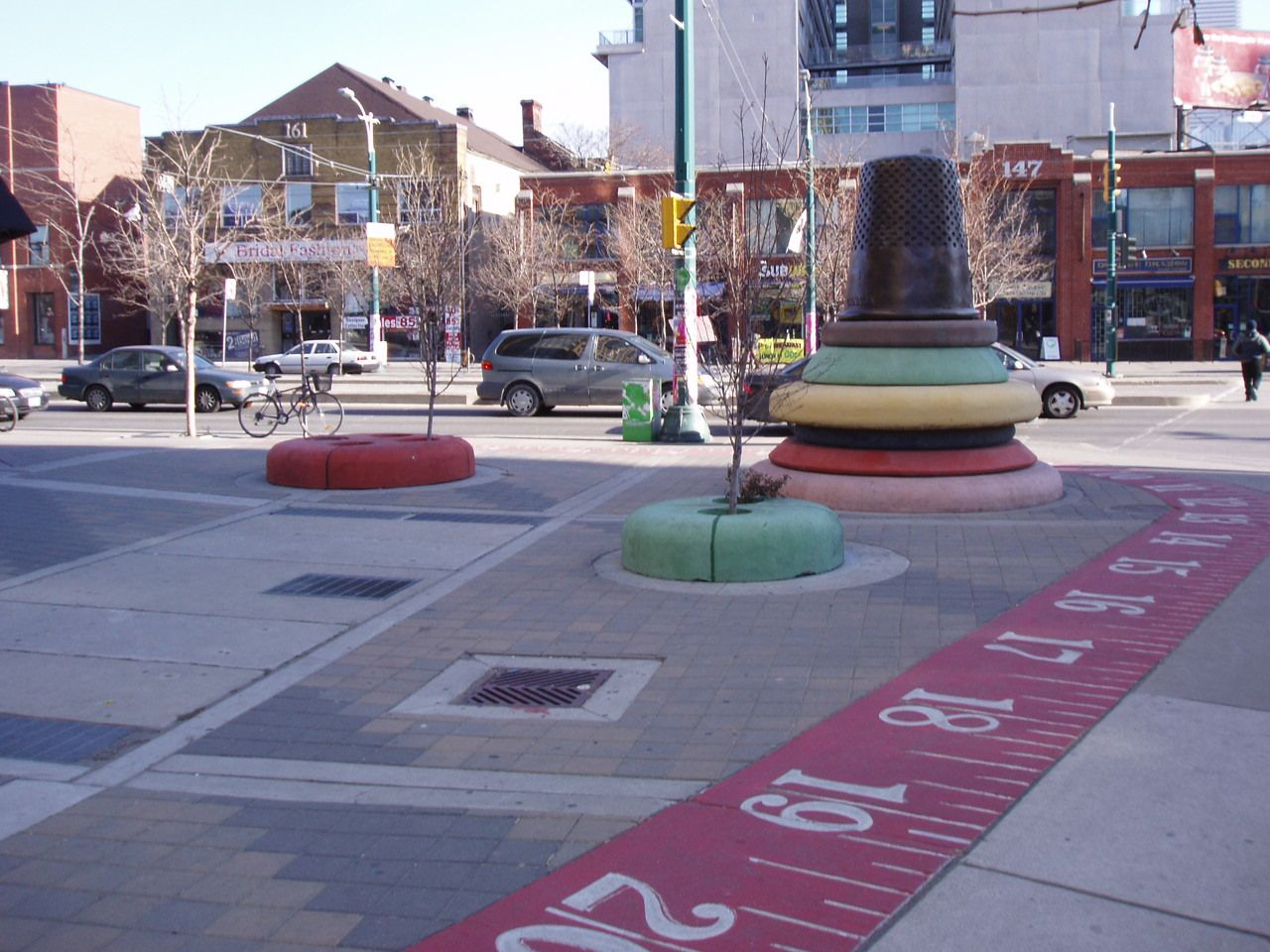
- Symbols of the garment district.

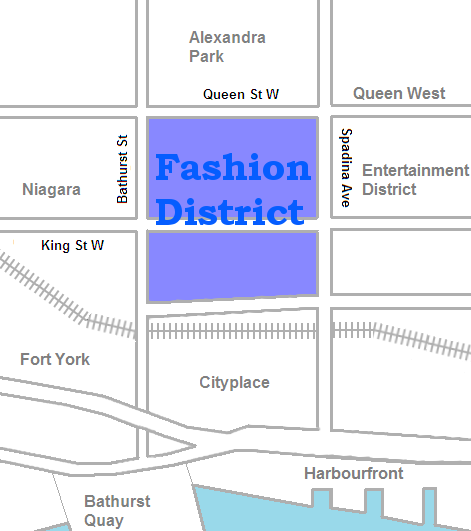
- Country: Canada
- Province: Ontario
- City: Toronto

Area
  - Total: 0.462 km^{2} (0.178 sq mi)

Population (2021)
  - Total: 9,592
  - Density: 20,762/km^{2} (53,770/sq mi)

The Fashion District (formerly known as the Garment District) is a commercial and residential district in Downtown Toronto, Ontario, Canada. It is located between the intersection of Bathurst Street to the west, Spadina Avenue to the east, Queen Street West to the north and Front Street to the south. Google Maps extends the district further east of Spadina Avenue to Peter Street.

== History ==
Historical population
Year	Pop.	±%
2011	3,949	—
2016	6,506	+64.8%
2021	9,592	+47.4%

The district's name is derived from the area's role in the garment industry. In the early 20th century, numerous textile and fabric factories and warehouses were located here due to the proximity and easy access to shipping and rail lines. Garment enterprise owners commissioned the construction of multi-storey buildings to house their manufacturing operations.

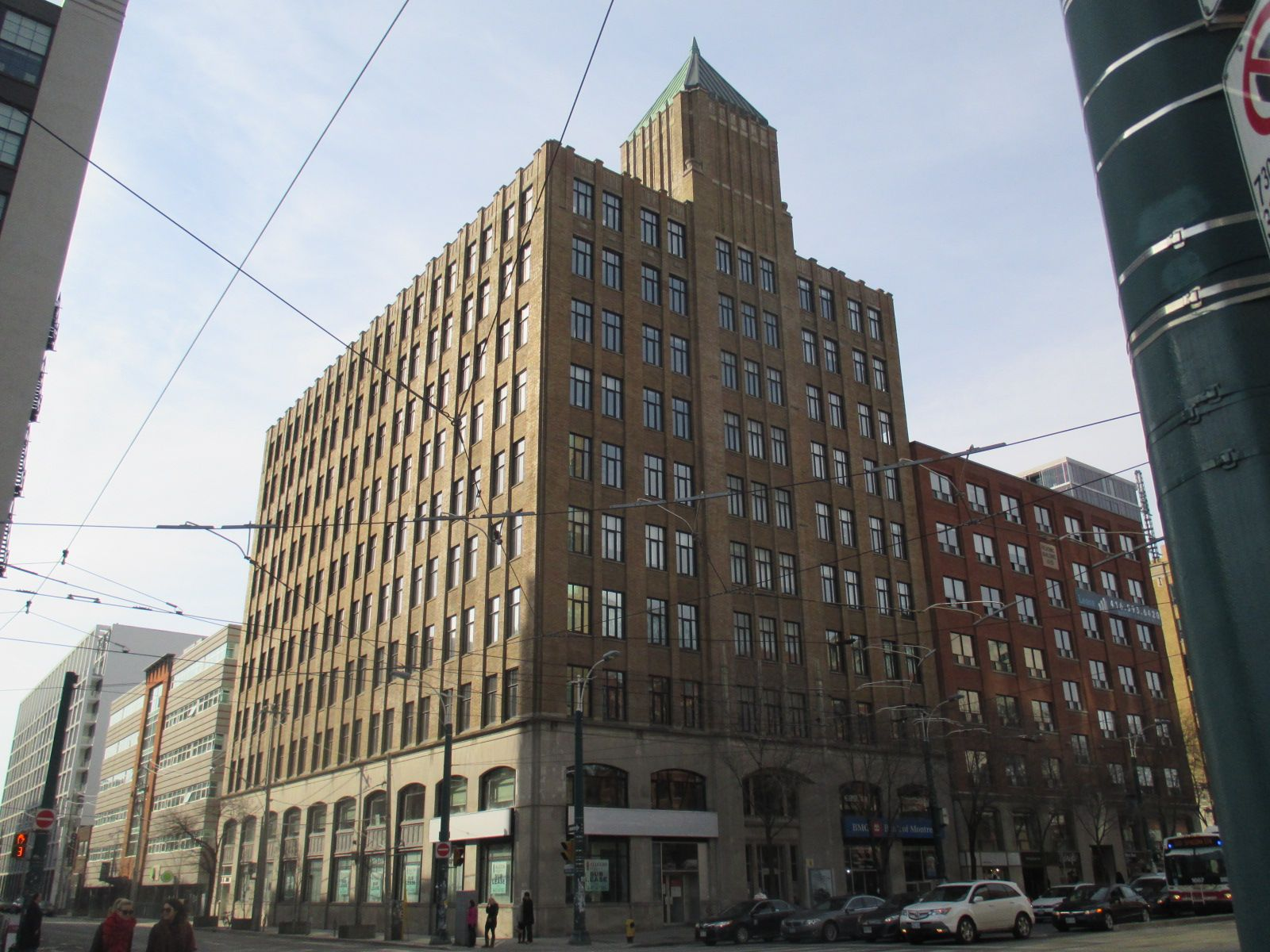
Clothing factories and warehouses originally occupied the Fashion District. Many of these buildings were later converted for other uses.

Once 80% of the city's Jewish community lived in the immediate area resulting in the establishment of numerous Jewish delis, tailors, bookstores, cinemas, Yiddish theatres and synagogues. Many from this community worked in the garment industry.

After World War II, much of that Jewish community moved further north, and the factories and warehouses began to be converted into other uses. Since the late 1980s, there has been extensive revitalization of the stretch of the Fashion District along Front Street between Spadina Avenue and Bathurst Street with disused railway land being reclaimed for high-end condominium, townhouse and retail development.

=== Present ===
Many former warehouses/shops have been transformed into condos, restaurants, bars or nightclubs. A prominent example of this is 580 King Street West - a nightclub known as Century Room that sits inside a Historical Building on King Street West. There are several buildings classified as Historical Buildings along King Street West and Queen Street West which builders have petitioned the city various times to demolish and turn into condos.

=== Future development ===
Seeing a spillover in condo developments from the adjacent Entertainment District, the Fashion District is starting to see an increase in the number of residential and multi-use developments.

Pemberton Group will develop 543 Richmond Street West on the corner of Portland. While details of the scope of the project have not yet been revealed, an early drawing from the city shows that the multi-phase project will have 476 units and 15 storeys per phase. A podium terrace will hold outdoor amenities which are yet to be determined. Toronto architecture firm Quadrangle will be responsible for the build.

One of the Fashion Districts many historical buildings will be demolished and replaced with condo developments. 73 Bathurst Street, which occupies the block from Stuart to King along the east side of Bathurst Street, will be torn down and developed by Timbercreek Developments, removing some of the neighbourhoods favourite small businesses including Banknote and Grand & Clover Cocktail Co. It will still be a couple of years before this development begins, but it is coming quickly just like many others.

== See also ==
- Benjamin Brown (architect) who designed buildings for garment manufacturers in the Fashion District.
