= William J. Wadsworth =

Canadian politician

William J. Wadsworth (died March 20, 1949) was a Canadian businessman and politician. He was a long serving municipal politician in Toronto, Ontario.

He was born in Flesherton, Ontario and migrated to Toronto when his family moved to the West Toronto Junction while he was still a youth. He worked for 15 years at the treasury department at Toronto City Hall and then left to work in the coal business. It was here that he founded and served as president of the Wadsworth Coal Company.

He was long active in politics, and was a member of the Progressive Conservative Party. He was elected to city council in 1927, representing the Junction area. He remained on city council for seven years before being elected to the Toronto Board of Control in the 1935 election. He served on the Board of Control until 1946. He was defeated in his bid for re-election by John Innes.

He retired from politics and was given a posting of LCBO inspector. He died of a stroke in 1949 at age 63.

Wadsworth Park near St. Clair and Weston is named after him.
