= William D. Robbins =

Canadian mayor (1874–1952)

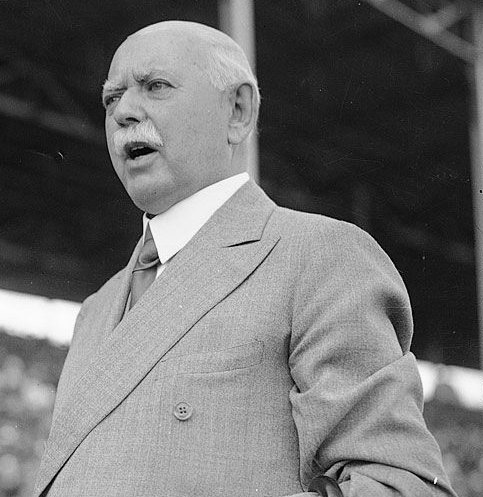
- Robbins in July 1937

45th Mayor of Toronto
- In office 1936–1937
- Preceded by: Samuel McBride
- Succeeded by: Ralph Day

Personal details
- Born: William Dullam Robbins; May 7, 1874 Downend, Gloucester, England
- Died: March 25, 1952 (aged 77) Toronto, Ontario, Canada

William Dullam Robbins (May 7, 1874 – March 25, 1952) was the 45th Mayor of Toronto from 1936 to 1937. He was appointed mayor after the death of incumbent Sam McBride and remained in office until defeated by Ralph Day in the 1937 elections. Robbins was considered a representative of labour in Toronto city politics, but was also a member of the Conservative Party. He served 18 years on city council and the Board of Control before becoming mayor. He was also a member of the Orange Order in Canada. He died after years of ill health at his Toronto home in 1952.
