= Gerard Kennedy =

Canadian politician (born 1960)

The Honourable Gerard Kennedy ECO
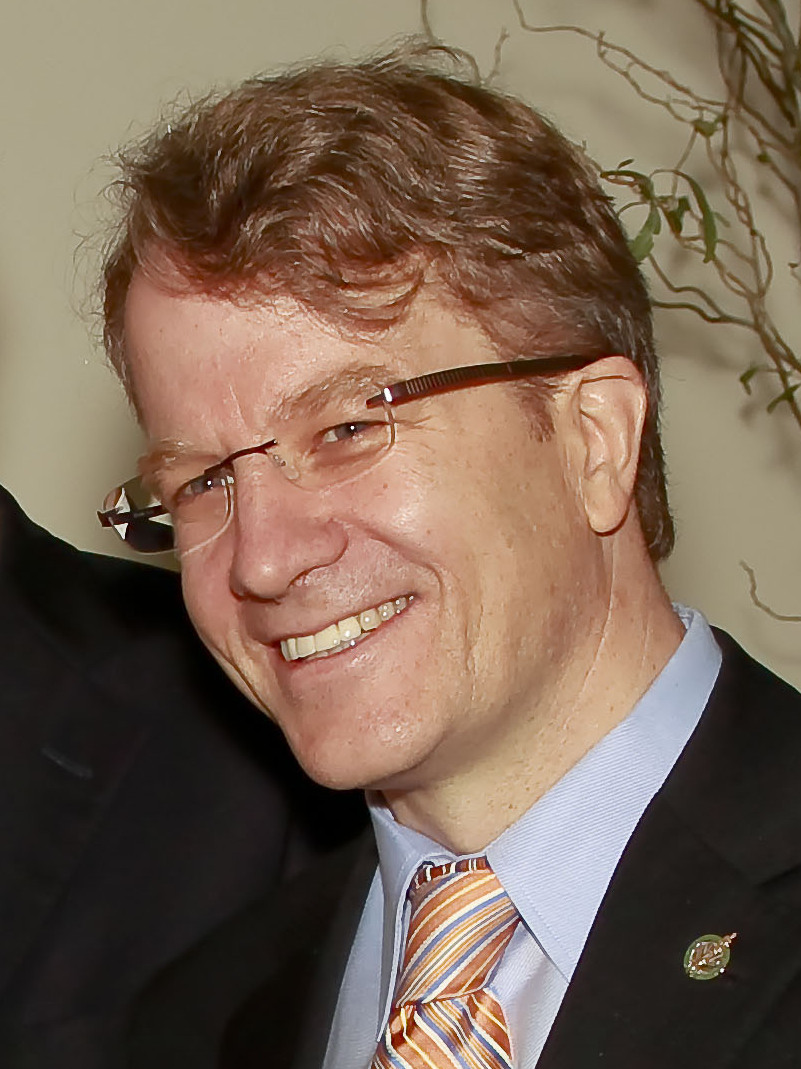
- Kennedy at an October 2010 political event.

Member of Parliament for Parkdale—High Park
- In office October 14, 2008 – May 2, 2011
- Preceded by: Peggy Nash
- Succeeded by: Peggy Nash

Member of the Ontario Provincial Parliament for Parkdale—High Park (York South; 1996–1999)
- In office May 23, 1996 – May 23, 2006
- Preceded by: Bob Rae
- Succeeded by: Cheri DiNovo

Personal details
- Born: Gerard Michael Kennedy; July 24, 1960 (age 66) The Pas, Manitoba, Canada
- Party: Liberal
- Other political affiliations: Ontario Liberal (1996–2006)
- Spouse: Jeanette Arsenault-Kennedy
- Children: 2
- Occupation: Food bank executive

Gerard Michael Kennedy (born July 24, 1960) is a Canadian politician in Ontario, Canada. He served as Ontario's minister of Education from 2003 to 2006, when he resigned to make an unsuccessful bid for the leadership of the Liberal Party of Canada. Kennedy previously ran for the leadership of the Ontario Liberal Party, losing to future premier Dalton McGuinty on the final ballot. He also lost the 2013 Ontario Liberal leadership race, placing third.

While attending the University of Alberta in Edmonton, he became involved in the local food bank, eventually becoming its first executive director in 1983. In 1986, he moved to Toronto to run the Daily Bread Food Bank and did so until he entered politics, in 1996.

He was elected to the Legislative Assembly of Ontario as an Ontario Liberal Party Member of Provincial Parliament (MPP) in a 1996 by-election to replace former premier Bob Rae in the York South constituency. In the 1999 and 2003 general elections, he was elected to represent the new Parkdale—High Park constituency. He became the province's Minister of Education in 2003, serving in McGuinty's first government.

In 2006, he resigned his cabinet post and then his legislative seat to seek the federal Liberal Party's leadership. He finished third in delegate selection meetings, but at the leadership convention, he placed fourth on both the first and second ballot before withdrawing to support the eventual winner, Stéphane Dion.

In the 2008 federal election he ran for the Liberal Party of Canada in the Parkdale—High Park electoral district and was elected as its Member of Parliament (MP). He ran for re-election in the 2011 federal election, but lost to former MP, Peggy Nash.

== Background ==
Kennedy is one of six children born to Jack and Caroline Kennedy (née Shemanski). Kennedy's father, descendant from Scottish ancestry originating in Cape Breton Island and the Ottawa Valley, ran a gas supply business in The Pas, Manitoba, eventually becoming that town's mayor. His mother's ancestry was Ukrainian, and her family lived in Canada's Prairie region. At age 14, Kennedy moved to Winnipeg to attend St. John's-Ravenscourt School on a hockey scholarship. After high school, he attended Trent University in Peterborough, Ontario, also on a hockey scholarship. When Trent's hockey program was cancelled, Kennedy switched education institutions and attended the University of Alberta to continue his undergraduate studies, but left in his fourth year, without completing his degree. He then worked as a historical researcher for the Government of Alberta in the early 1980s. He began his social activism career when he directed the volunteer program at an Edmonton Food Bank in 1983.

After moving to Ontario, Kennedy was the executive director of Toronto's Daily Bread Food Bank from 1986 to 1996. The food bank distributed $30 million worth of food each year without government funding; 150,000 people are estimated to have used its services every month. Kennedy was named in Toronto Life Magazine's list of fifty influential people in 1992, and was named newsmaker of the year by the Toronto Star in 1993. Kennedy was also given an honourable mention in the Financial Post Magazine's C.E.O. awards in 1995.

Kennedy is married to Jeanette Arsenault-Kennedy, a daycare professional and Acadian (Francophone) from Prince Edward Island. They have two children, daughter Théria and son John-Julien.

== Provincial politics ==
=== York South ===
Kennedy entered political life in May 1996, running in a by-election for the Ontario legislature in Toronto's York South constituency, which was vacated by former Ontario New Democratic Party (NDP) leader Bob Rae. On May 23, Kennedy was the first candidate not from the NDP or its predecessor, the Co-operative Commonwealth Federation, to win the seat since 1955. He received 7774 votes; his nearest opponent was the NDP's David Miller, at the time, a Toronto city councillor, who received 6656 votes.

Despite being a newcomer to politics, Kennedy became the front-runner to replace Lyn McLeod as leader of the Ontario Liberal Party in late 1996. Although popular on the left-wing, he encountered a strong "anyone-but-Kennedy" movement from the party's establishment and right-wing which was divided among several candidates on the leadership convention floor. Kennedy finished first on the first, second, third and fourth ballots, but was defeated on the fifth ballot by Dalton McGuinty. Although McGuinty finished in fourth place on the first ballot, he was able to increase his support in the subsequent ballots, gaining delegates from the candidates that dropped off. The results of the leadership contest did not prove divisive within the party and both rivals eventually became strong allies. Kennedy served as the party's Health Critic during McGuinty's first opposition term.

=== Parkdale–High Park ===
In the 1999 Ontario general election, Kennedy sought to contest the redistributed York South—Weston constituency, which encompassed the majority of his previous York South constituency. However, he was persuaded to withdraw his candidacy in favour of Joseph Cordiano, a former leadership rival. The redistribution policies implemented by McGuinty, which allocated the first choice in redistributed electoral districts to senior MPs, favoured Cordiano over Kennedy, who had served since 1985.

Kennedy opted to run in the neighbouring Parkdale—High Park constituency, which encompassed approximately one-fifth of his previous constituency, primarily the affluent Baby Point neighbourhood. He faced a formidable challenge from Annamarie Castrilli, another former Liberal leadership contender who had defected to the governing Progressive Conservatives on the final day of the legislature. Media reports at the time indicated that the election would be highly competitive, given the relative strength of the three major parties being evenly divided within this newly created constituency.

The Progressive Conservatives were re-elected, establishing another majority government. Despite their favourable performance across the province, they were unable to secure any seats in the former City of Toronto area. Kennedy emerged victorious with a substantial plurality, with his closest rival, Castrilli, trailing by approximately 10,000 votes. Subsequently, Kennedy assumed the role of opposition critic for the high-profile Education portfolio.

=== Minister of Education ===
The Liberals won a majority in the 2003 Ontario provincial election, and Kennedy was re-elected in Parkdale-High Park with about 58 percent of the vote (his nearest opponent received 16 percent). He was appointed Minister of Education on October 23, 2003.

Under the two previous governments, the Education portfolio had been marked by considerable labour strife, due to either the austerity measure known as the Social Contract under the Bob Rae government, or school board restructuring and funding formula changes under the Mike Harris government. In the spring of 2005, Kennedy announced the establishment of a provincial framework in teacher negotiations, which would see teachers' salaries increase by approximately 10.5 percent over four years in exchange for four years of labour peace. The framework included priorities such as workplace preparation courses and English as a Second Language programs.

== Federal politics ==
=== 2006 federal Liberal leadership race ===
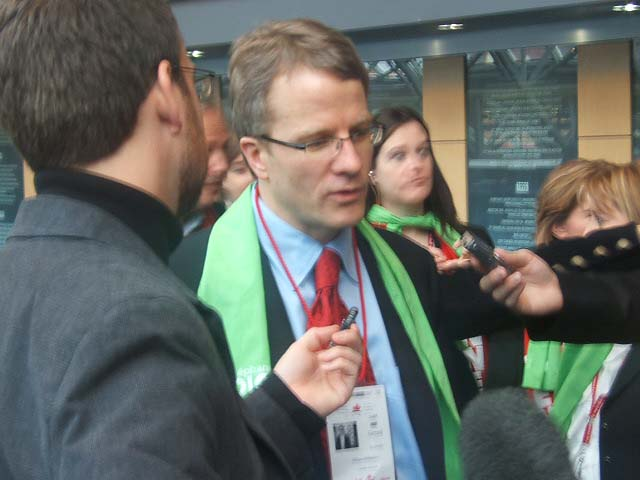
Kennedy soon after dropping out of the race and endorsing Dion.

On April 5, 2006 Kennedy resigned as Minister of Education to pursue the federal Liberal Leadership. Premier McGuinty, who admitted that finding a replacement was difficult, was reported to have set that day as a deadline for Kennedy to make a decision in order to prevent the leadership speculation from overshadowing the Ontario government's agenda. Kennedy formally declared his candidacy in front of the House of Commons in Ottawa, on April 27, 2006.

On May 18, Kennedy formally resigned from the provincial legislature. His resignation came after several weeks of criticism over drawing an MPP's salary, despite his absence from the legislature and his stated intention to live for part of the summer in Quebec. Kennedy responded saying that he intended to resign his seat "sooner rather than later," but first wanted to finish some local projects he'd been working on.

On August 16, Premier McGuinty called a by-election to replace Kennedy in Parkdale–High Park for September 14. The centre-left leaning riding was arguably held in part thanks to Kennedy's personal popularity (due to his work as food bank director and education minister) versus that of his party; Sylvia Watson could not retain the seat for the Liberals in the subsequent by-election, apparently being unable to "ride the coattails of Kennedy's popularity".

The Toronto Star reported that Gerard Kennedy appeared to have signed up more new members than any other candidate during the member recruitment period. The article stated that it had been "conventional wisdom" that Michael Ignatieff and Bob Rae were the leaders in the race but Kennedy's numbers indicated that it was a wide-open race.

On September 8, Joe Fontana, MP for London North Centre and Gerard Kennedy's Ontario Co-Chair, announced that he would be resigning his seat in the House of Commons to run for mayor in London; and, it was speculated Kennedy would run in the by-election, which he did not.

On "Super Weekend", from September 29 to October 1, the Liberal Party elected approximately 85% of delegates. Kennedy finished in third place with 17.3% of delegates being pledged to his campaign, a similar number to Stéphane Dion, who received 16.0% and to Bob Rae who received 20.3%. (Note: At the December Liberal leadership convention, the "Super Weekend" elected delegates were bound (or committed) to vote on the first ballot for the leadership candidate they had pledged to support. On the second and subsequent ballots, however, the delegates were – if they wished – able to switch their votes to another candidate.) Besides sizable delegate support he was supported also by 20 MPs and former MPs, with about a dozen Ontario MPPs.

On November 27, Kennedy attracted media attention when he became the first leadership candidate to oppose a motion being debated in the House of Commons of Canada, that would have declared the Québécois "a nation within a united Canada". Kennedy was joined in that position later that day by fellow candidates Ken Dryden and Joe Volpe.

At the convention, Dion placed higher than Kennedy in the first ballot voting, finishing ahead of Kennedy by two votes–17.8% to 17.7%). That gap increased to 2% after the second ballot–20.8% to 18.8%. Kennedy chose to leave the ballot before he would have been forced to, and supported Dion. Earlier, the two leadership contenders had allegedly struck a pact in which the first off the ballot would throw his support to the other. Pundits said that this surprise move had caught the Ignatieff and Rae strategists off guard. Kennedy delivered his delegates extraordinarily en masse, as Dion's support increased to 37.0% on the third ballot, moving from third place to first and eliminating Rae. Dion retained the position for the fourth and decisive ballot which resulted in him winning the leadership.

=== Post-leadership race ===
On December 19, 2006, Dion announced that Kennedy would be his special adviser on election readiness and renewal with "intimate involvement in all aspects of election readiness and the platform. In late August 2007, Kennedy entered the academic world accepting a position at the Ted Rogers School of Management at Ryerson University. He served a one-year term as a Distinguished Visiting Professor until September 2008.

In late September 2007, Kennedy was part of a group observing Ukraine's parliamentary elections in the Mariupol electoral commission. Kennedy reported back to the Canadian media that the group he was a party to was confronted by Ukrainian police who stripped passports and observer statuses. Kennedy said that the police were interfering in the process, and the observer group felt intimidated by the police who carried weapons and followed the group around for a day. Kennedy concluded that there were major flaws in the voting process, as the group was also witness to extra ballots being distributed by the ruling party in that city.

=== 2008 election in Parkdale–High Park ===
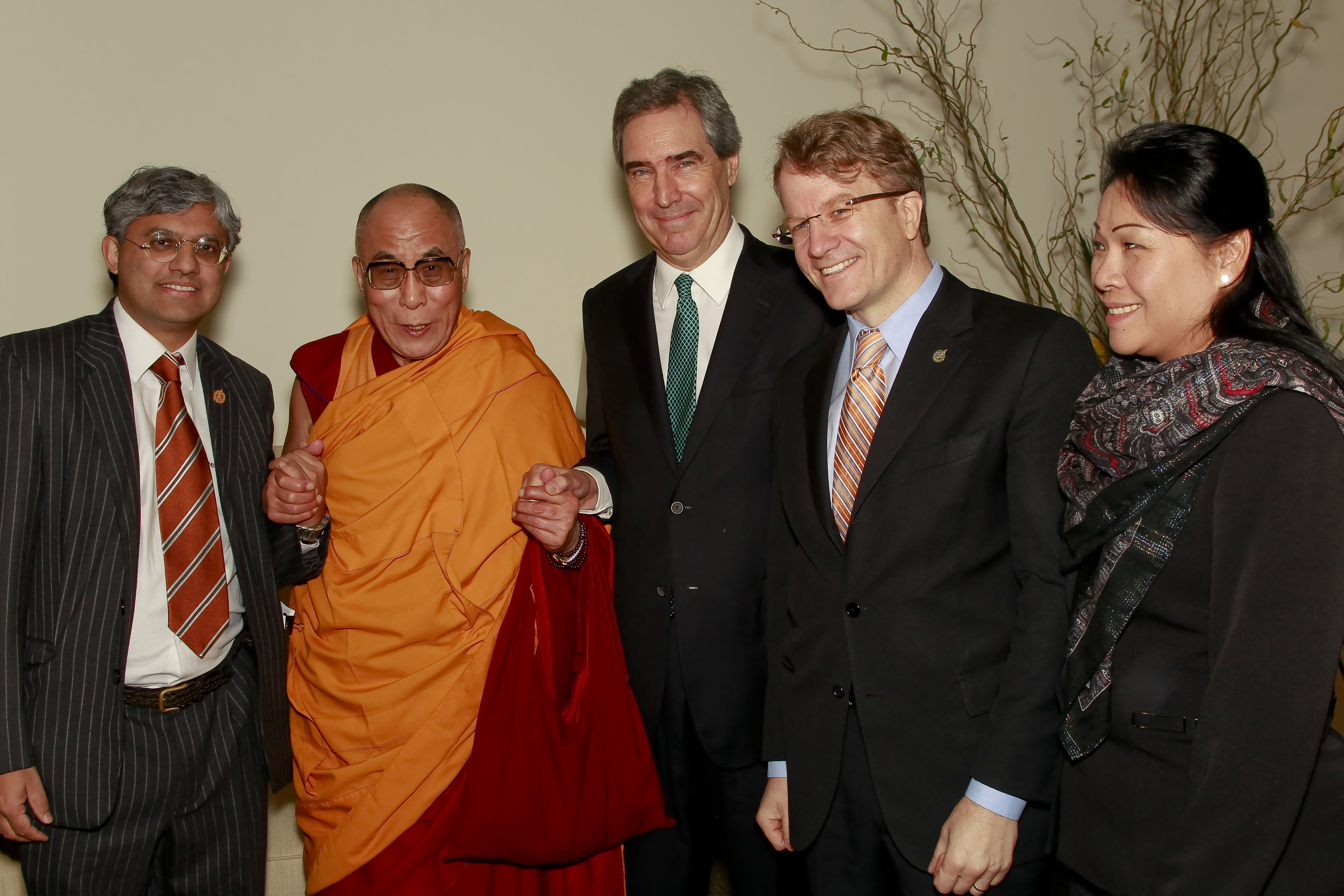
Kennedy (2nd from right) meeting Dalai Lama at Tibetan Centre in Etobicoke.

On February 6, 2007, Kennedy confirmed that he would seek the Liberal nomination for Parkdale—High Park in the next federal election. At the time, the electoral district was represented by New Democrat Peggy Nash. Kennedy won the nomination by acclamation on April 24, 2007.

On March 31, 2008, although he was not a member of the House of Commons of Canada, Kennedy was appointed to the Official Opposition Shadow Cabinet by leader Stéphane Dion. Kennedy served as Intergovernmental Affairs critic, which gave him responsibility to speak on behalf of the Liberal Party on matters of federal-provincial relations.

In the October 2008 federal election, Kennedy defeated Nash by over 3300 votes, or roughly by a seven percent margin. He was mentioned as a possible candidate in the 2008/09 Liberal leadership race, but eventually decided to pass on another leadership run.

=== War resisters bill ===
On September 17, 2009, Kennedy tabled a private member's bill in the House of Commons. The bill would change provisions of the Immigration and Refugee Protection Act to provide sanctuary in Canada for American and other countries' war resisters on moral, political or religious grounds.

=== 2011 election in Parkdale–High Park ===
In 2011, Kennedy sought re-election to his Parkdale–High Park seat against Peggy Nash in a rematch of the 2008 campaign. The campaign was heated at times, and on election night, harnessing the NDP's unprecedented levels of support, Nash defeated him to regain her old seat.

== 2013 Ontario Liberal leadership race ==
On November 12, 2012, Kennedy announced that he was seeking the leadership of the Ontario Liberal Party to replace Dalton McGuinty. At his campaign launch in London, Kennedy criticized the government's Bill 115 to ban teacher's strikes and freeze wages. Of the seven candidates, Kennedy has said he would consider repealing the bill.

On November 16, 2012, he gained the formal support of former cabinet minister George Smitherman and Joseph Cordiano. On November 21, 2012, Niagara Falls MPP Kim Craitor endorsed Kennedy. Kennedy has also gained the support of MPP's Bob Delaney, and Shafiq Qaadri.

Early polls placed Kennedy ahead of other candidates to replace Premier McGuinty, helped by his name recognition from his federal and provincial work, and his role as director of the Food Bank. In a poll of Ontarion released on November 29, 2012 by Forum Research, 37% said they would support Kennedy, followed by Sandra Pupatello (23%), Kathleen Wynne (19%), Eric Hoskins (7%), Glen Murray (6%), and Charles Sousa (4%). Among Liberal voters, Kennedy scored first with 38% support.

After the second ballot, in which he placed third with 13.7% of the vote, Kennedy dropped out and endorsed the eventual winner, Wynne, who went on to become Premier of Ontario.

== Private sector ==
From 2013 to 2021, Kennedy served as CEO of Alpha Healthcare/Alpha Laboratories. He had previously served as a consultant to the company while serving as a Member of Parliament.

== Electoral record ==
2011 Canadian federal election
Party	Candidate	Votes	%	±%
New Democratic	Peggy Nash	24,045	47.2%	+11.2
Liberal	Gerard Kennedy	16,732	32.9%	-10.1
Conservative	Taylor Train	7,907	15.5%	+3.4
Green	Sarah Newton	1,663	3.3%	4.2
Christian Heritage	Andrew Borkowski	256	0.5%	0%
Marijuana	Terry Parker	213	0.4%	0%
Marxist–Leninist	Lorne Gershuny	86	0.2%	0%
Total valid votes		50,902		
Total rejected ballots		–		
Turnout		50,902	70.7%	+4.7%
Total registered electors		71,954		
Source: Elections Canada

2008 Canadian federal election
Party	Candidate	Votes	%	±%
Liberal	Gerard Kennedy	20,705	42.98%	+7.7
New Democratic	Peggy Nash	17,332	35.97	-4.4
Conservative	Jilian Saweczko	5,992	12.4%	-4.65
Green	Robert L. Rishchynski	3,601	7.47%	+1.99
Christian Heritage	Andrew Borkowski	230	0.48%	–
Marijuana	Terry Parker	209	0.43%	-0.2
Marxist–Leninist	Lorne Gershuny	110	0.23%	-0.04
Total valid votes		48,164		
Total rejected ballots		–		
Turnout		–	66.0%	
Source: CBC News

2003 Ontario general election: Parkdale—High Park
Party	Candidate	Votes	%	±%	Expenditures
Liberal	Gerard Kennedy	23,008	57.83	+2.91	$40,269.51
Progressive Conservative	Stephen Snell	6,436	16.18	–13.99	$38,656.44
New Democratic	Margo Duncan	6,275	15.77	+3.99	$12,018.40
Green	Neil Spiegel	2,758	6.93	+5.74	$21,119.32
Family Coalition	Stan J. Grzywna	591	1.49	+0.80	$161.00
Communist	Karin Larsen	349	0.88	–	$857.38
Independent	John Brian Steele	204	0.51	–	$107.66
Freedom	Richard (Dick) Field	165	0.41	–	$0.00
Total valid votes		39,786	99.06		
Total rejected, unmarked and declined ballots		376	0.94	–0.14	
Turnout		40,162	54.94	–5.52	
Eligible voters		73,108			
Liberal hold		Swing		+8.45	
Source: Elections Ontario

1999 Ontario general election: Parkdale—High Park
Party	Candidate	Votes	%	Expenditures
Liberal	Gerard Kennedy	23,022	54.92	$63,007.91
Progressive Conservative	Annamarie Castrilli	12,647	30.17	$57,256.00
New Democratic	Irene Atkinson	4,937	11.78	$31,655.28
Green	Frank de Jong	500	1.19	$66.19
Libertarian	Doug Burn	325	0.78	$1,060.80
Family Coalition	Stan J. Grzywna	289	0.69	$18.00
Natural Law	J. Lynne Hea	99	0.24	$0.00
Independent (Humanist)	Jorge van Schouwen	99	0.24	$0.00
Total valid votes		41,918	98.93	
Total rejected, unmarked and declined ballots		454	1.07	
Turnout		42,372	60.45	
Eligible voters		70,091		
Liberal pickup new district.				
Source: Elections Ontario

Ontario provincial by-election, May 23, 1996: York South
Party	Candidate	Votes	%
Liberal	Gerard Kennedy	7,774	39.22
New Democratic	David Miller	6,656	33.58
Progressive Conservative	Rob Davis	5,093	25.69
Independent	David Milne	151	0.76
Libertarian	George Dance	77	0.39
Independent	Kevin Clarke	70	0.35
Total valid votes		19,821	100.00
Rejected, unmarked and declined ballots		264	
Turnout		20,085	51.38
Electors on the lists		39,092	
Source: Elections Ontario

== Cabinet offices held ==
McGuinty ministry, Province of Ontario (2003–2013)
Cabinet post (1)
Predecessor	Office	Successor
Elizabeth Witmer	Minister of Education; 2003–2006	Sandra Pupatello
