= Sarmite Bulte =

Canadian lawyer, advocate and politician

The Honourable Sarmite Bulte PC

Member of Parliament for Parkdale—High Park
- In office 1997–2006
- Preceded by: Jesse Flis
- Succeeded by: Peggy Nash

Personal details
- Born: September 27, 1953 (age 73) Hamilton, Ontario, Canada
- Party: Liberal Party of Canada
- Profession: Lawyer

Sarmite Drosma "Sam" Bulte, PC (Latvian: Sarmīte Drosma Bulte, born September 27, 1953) is a Canadian lawyer, advocate and politician. A member of the Liberal Party, she represented the Toronto riding of Parkdale-High Park in the House of Commons of Canada through three successive parliaments from June 2, 1997, to January 22, 2006. Bulte was the first Canadian of Latvian heritage to take a seat in Parliament.

Born in Hamilton, Ontario, Bulte received an Honours Bachelor of Arts from University College, University of Toronto, Specialist Certificate in English in 1975. In 1978, she received a Bachelor of Laws from the University of Windsor. In 1980 she was called to the Law Society of Upper Canada. In July 2004, she was appointed to the Privy Council.

== Political career ==
Bulte was considered as one of the more left-wing members of the Liberal Party of Canada on social issues. She was known in Parliament for her special report of women's entrepreneurship. She was also a member of the Prime Minister's Task Force on Youth Entrepreneurs as well as the member of the Liberal Caucus Task Force on Financial Institutions and the Standing Committee on Citizenship and Immigration. She served as the Parliamentary Secretary to the Minister of Canadian Heritage and Minister responsible for the Status of Women and the Minister of Industry with special emphasis on Women Entrepreneurs.

Bulte chaired the Ontario caucus, travelled extensively to advocate for Canada's seat on the UN Security Council and was frequently called upon to deal directly with foreign parliaments in her capacity as Canadian head of the Commonwealth Parliamentary Association.

Bulte took the position that downloading music, films, novels and other works of art without permission robbed the creators of their right to profit from their creativity. Her critics argued that protecting those rights should not result in individuals being prosecuted.

During the 2006 federal election, Bulte was criticized by law professor Michael Geist, historian Jack Granatstein and blogger Cory Doctorow among others. The criticism centred on the perception of a conflict of interest relating to her position as "one of the leading people on copyright policy, possibly even the future Canadian heritage minister" and her stance in favour of stricter digital copyright laws in the face of campaign contributions to her riding association from Canadian and American entertainment industries, artists, musicians and others with interests in copyright ownership. All of the contributions were well within the legal limits set by Elections Canada and Bulte stated the total donations by companies, trade unions and individuals with interest in stricter digital domain copyright rules represented approximately 10% of donations to her riding association. Adding to the controversy, in January 2006 a $250-a-plate fund raiser was hosted for her by lobbyists from the film, music and video game industries.

In the January 23, 2006 election, she was defeated by New Democratic Party candidate Peggy Nash.

== After politics ==
Since her departure from Federal politics she has remained an active and prominent supporter of the Liberal Party. She appeared as the Liberal voice on a Toronto Talk Show, Goldhawk Live! and was most recently alongside Peter Mansbridge and Don Newman on CBC's 2008 election night coverage.

Since leaving politics Bulte worked as a consultant to the Ontario government on women entrepreneurship issues, and has worked in Kosovo for the National Democratic Institute as Senior Legislative Consultant to the Assembly of Kosovo. She helped Kosavar parliamentarians understand how their party caucuses could fulfil their roles as forums for debate and coordination of party strategies, advised the all-party women's caucus on how they could become a more active, better organized body within the assembly, and to assist in standardizing legislative oversight and expand oversight of new committees. She sits on the Board of the Actors' Fund of Canada, Runnymede Healthcare Centre, the St. Joseph's Hospital Foundation Board, the Artscape Foundation Board, and the Toronto Museum Project.

== Attempted return ==
In December 2007, Bulte announced her intention to seek the federal Liberal nomination for the riding of Don Valley West to replace John Godfrey who had earlier announced that he would be resigning his seat in the House of Commons in July in order to accept a position as headmaster of Toronto French School. Constitutional lawyer Deborah Coyne also sought the nomination along with United Church Minister Rob Oliphant, local businessman Mohammad Ijaz, former NDP candidate Ian Cameron, and Jonathan Mousley, a former legislative assistant to former Liberal Cabinet minister David Collenette. The March 2, 2008 nomination meeting was won by Oliphant on the fourth round of voting.

== Family ==
She is married with three children, David, Lara and Boris (Alex).

== Electoral record (incomplete) ==
2000 Canadian federal election: Parkdale—High Park
Party	Candidate	Votes	%	Expenditures
Liberal	Sarmite Bulte	20,676	49.41	$58,030
New Democratic	Paul Schmidt	7,947	18.99	$22,078
Progressive Conservative	David Strycharz	5,681	13.58	$14,911
Alliance	Vicki Vancas	4,882	11.67	$7,470
Green	Neil Spiegel	1,161	2.77	$2,942
Marijuana	Terry Parker	775	1.85	none listed
Canadian Action	Greg Robertson	317	0.76	$1,107
Communist	Wilfred Szczesny	155	0.37	$202
Communist League	Michel Dugré	132	0.32	$149
Marxist–Leninist	Lorne Gershuny	122	0.29	$8
Total valid votes		41,848	100.00	
Total rejected ballots		227		
Turnout		42,075	58.22	
Electors on the lists		72,274		
Sources: Official Results, Elections Canada and Financial Returns, Elections Canada.
