= Arif Virani =

Canadian lawyer and politician

The Honourable Arif Virani PC KC
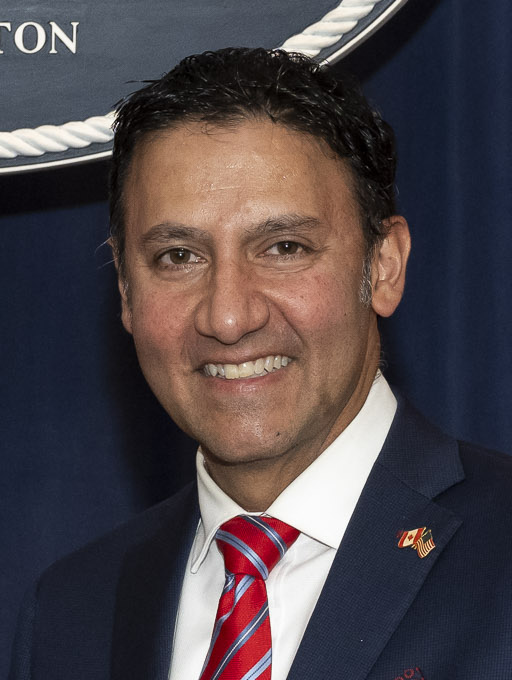
- Virani in 2024

Minister of Justice Attorney General of Canada
- In office July 26, 2023 – March 14, 2025
- Prime Minister: Justin Trudeau
- Preceded by: David Lametti
- Succeeded by: Gary Anandasangaree

Parliamentary Secretary to the Minister of Justice and Attorney General of Canada
- In office August 31, 2018 – July 26, 2023
- Minister: Jody Wilson-Raybould; David Lametti
- Preceded by: Marco Mendicino

Parliamentary Secretary to the Minister of Canadian Heritage (Multiculturalism)
- In office January 28, 2017 – August 30, 2018
- Minister: Mélanie Joly
- Preceded by: Vacant
- Succeeded by: Gary Anandasangaree

Parliamentary Secretary to the Minister of Immigration, Refugees and Citizenship
- In office December 2, 2015 – January 27, 2017
- Minister: John McCallum
- Preceded by: Costas Menegakis
- Succeeded by: Serge Cormier

Member of Parliament for Parkdale—High Park
- In office October 19, 2015 – March 23, 2025
- Preceded by: Peggy Nash
- Succeeded by: Karim Bardeesy

Personal details
- Born: November 23, 1971 (age 54) Kampala, Uganda
- Party: Liberal
- Spouse: Suchita Jain
- Education: McGill University (BA); University of Toronto Faculty of Law (LLB)
- Profession: Lawyer

Arif Virani (born November 23, 1971) is a Canadian lawyer and former politician who served as the minister of justice and attorney general of Canada from 2023 to 2025. A member of the Liberal Party, Virani represented Parkdale—High Park in the House of Commons from 2015 to 2025.

Prior to his appointment as Minister of Justice and Attorney General, he held a number of parliamentary secretary portfolios, including to the minister of immigration, refugees and citizenship from 2015 to 2017, and to the minister of Canadian heritage (multiculturalism) from 2017 to 2018, to the minister of justice and attorney general from 2018 to 2021, and to the minister of international trade, export promotion, small business and economic development from 2021 to 2023. On February 10, 2025, Virani announced he would not be running for re-election during the 2025 Canadian federal election.

== Background ==
Virani's roots are in Ahmedabad, Gujarat, India although he was born in Kampala. Virani is a multilingual Ismaili Muslim who came to Canada as a refugee from Uganda after the expulsion of Indians from that country. Upon arriving in Canada in 1972, his family was taken in by the YMCA in Montreal. His family then became more permanently established in Toronto. Virani spent his childhood growing up in the Flemingdon Park and Willowdale neighbourhoods.

=== Education ===
Virani graduated as a joint honours Bachelor of Arts in political science and history from McGill University in 1994. He then graduated from the University of Toronto Faculty of Law. Virani remained connected to the University of Toronto Faculty of Law following his graduation by remaining involved with its alumni committee.

== Legal career ==
Virani began his legal career by articling for Fasken Martineau DuMoulin in 1999. Following this, he worked in London, United Kingdom for a year with the support of the Harold G. Fox scholarship. This scholarship for recent graduates of the Bar Admission Course allows for a pupilage with leading barristers at the Inns of Court in London.

In 2003, he went on to work as a lawyer for the constitutional law branch of the Ontario Ministry of the Attorney General. During his time with the Ontario constitutional law branch, he appeared in one case at the Supreme Court of Canada.

Virani did not practise law when he was an MP. He remained an L1 class licensed lawyer according to the Law Society of Ontario, and continued to be "entitled to practise law in Ontario as a barrister and solicitor".

After retiring from politics, Virani was hired by Torys LLP as a senior legal counsel, working in litigation and dispute resolution.

== Personal life ==
Virani lives in Roncesvalles Village in Toronto with his wife Suchita Jain, originally from London, Ontario, and their two sons.

== Electoral record ==
2021 Canadian federal election: Parkdale—High Park
Party	Candidate	Votes	%	±%	Expenditures
Liberal	Arif Virani	22,307	42.45	-4.94	$104,400.40
New Democratic	Paul M. Taylor	20,602	39.21	+7.71	$106,004.63
Conservative	Nestor Sanajko	6,815	12.97	-0.19	$9,183.25
People's	Wilfried Richard Alexander Danzinger	1,642	3.13	+2.07	$724.84
Green	Diem Marchand-Lafortune	957	1.82	-4.61	$3,873.90
Marijuana	Terry Parker	130	0.25	+0.05	$0.00
Marxist–Leninist	Lorne Gershuny	90	0.17	+0.10	$0.00
Total valid votes/expense limit		52,543	–	–	$110,699.74
Total rejected ballots					
Turnout		52,543	65.46		
Eligible voters		80,265			
Liberal hold		Swing		-6.33	
Source: Elections Canada

2019 Canadian federal election: Parkdale—High Park
Party	Candidate	Votes	%	±%	Expenditures
Liberal	Arif Virani	28,852	47.4	+5.36	$104,265.06
New Democratic	Paul M. Taylor	19,180	31.5	-8.74	$100,698.11
Conservative	Adam Pham	8,015	13.2	+0.15	$44,890.73
Green	Nick Capra	3,916	6.4	+3.42	$14,108.37
People's	Greg Wycliffe	643	1.1	-	none listed
Communist	Alykhan Pabani	119	0.2	-	$626.57
Marijuana	Terry Parker	119	0.2	-0.13	none listed
Marxist–Leninist	Lorne Gershuny	43	0.07	-0.1	none listed
Total valid votes/expense limit		60,887	100.0		
Total rejected ballots		382			
Turnout		61,269	74.0		
Eligible voters		82,797			
Liberal hold		Swing		+7.05	
Source: Elections Canada

2015 Canadian federal election: Parkdale—High Park
Party	Candidate	Votes	%	±%	Expenditures
Liberal	Arif Virani	24,623	42.04%	+9.15	–
New Democratic	Peggy Nash	23,566	40.24%	-6.96	–
Conservative	Ian Allen	7,641	13.05%	-2.5	–
Green	Adam Phipps	1,743	2.98%	-0.29	–
Libertarian	Mark Jeftovic	610	1.04%	–	–
Marijuana	Terry Parker	191	0.33%	-0.09	–
Marxist–Leninist	Lorne Gershuny	100	0.17%	+/-0.00	–
Independent	Carol Royer	93	0.16%	–	–
Total valid votes/expense limit		58,567	100.0		$210,593.15
Total rejected ballots		269	–	–	–
Turnout		58,836	–	–	–
Eligible voters		76,952	–	–	–
Source: Elections Canada

29th Canadian Ministry (2015–2025) – Cabinet of Justin Trudeau
Cabinet post (1)
Predecessor	Office	Successor
David Lametti	Minister of Justice; July 26, 2023 – March 14, 2025	Gary Anandasangaree
