= Richard Roy (disambiguation) =

Richard Roy is a director, actor and screenwriter.

Richard Roy may also refer to:

- Richard Roy (musician), former bassist in Canadian punk pop band Sum 41
- Richard Roy (politician), Green Party of Canada candidate in 1993
- Richard Roy (footballer) (born 1987), Trinidad and Tobago footballer
