= 2009 Liberal Party of Canada leadership election =

Party election in Canada

- May 2, 2009
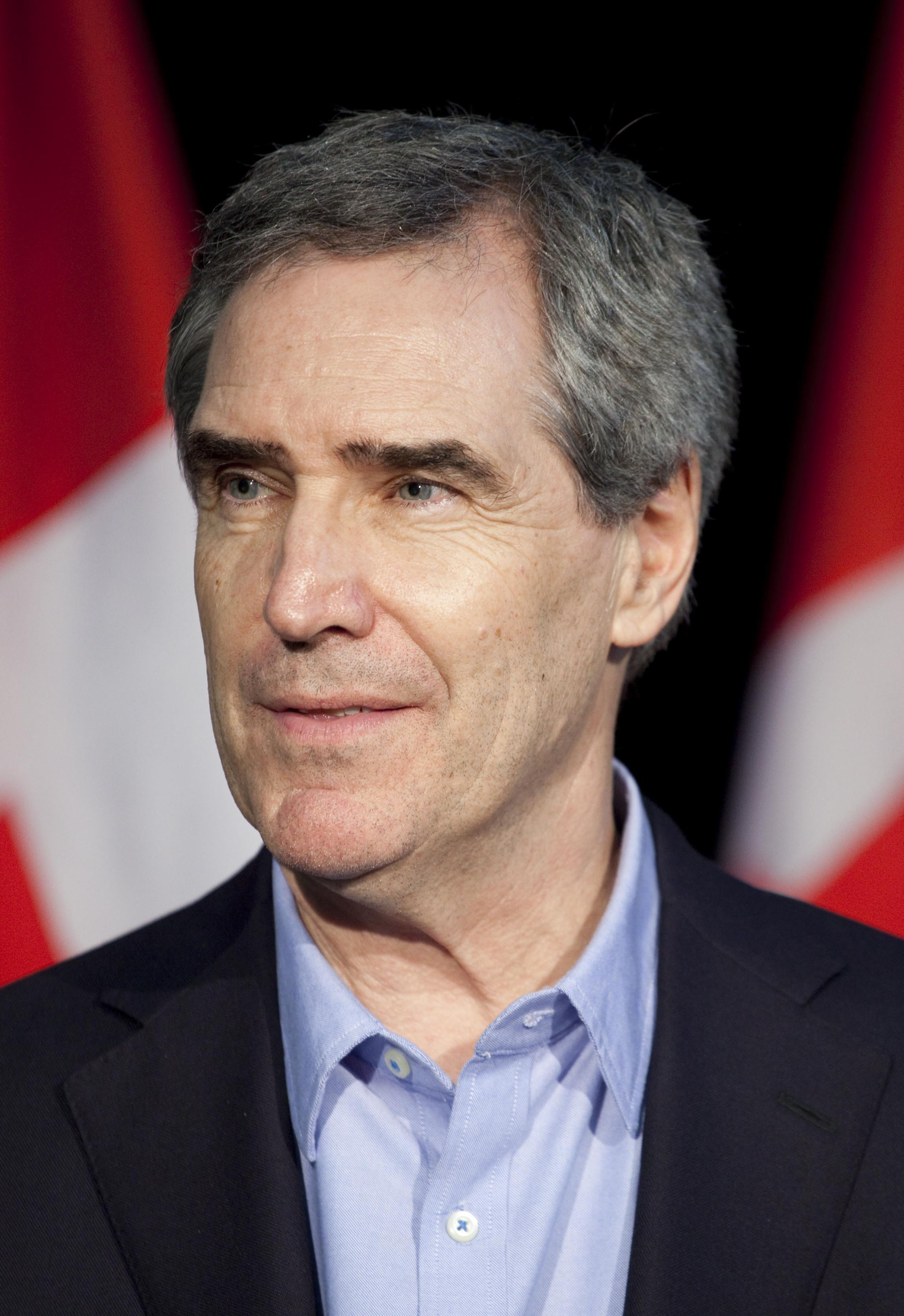
Candidate	Michael Ignatieff
Delegate count	1,964
Percentage	97%
Leader before election
Michael Ignatieff (interim)
Stéphane Dion (elected)
Elected Leader
Michael Ignatieff

2009 Liberal leadership election
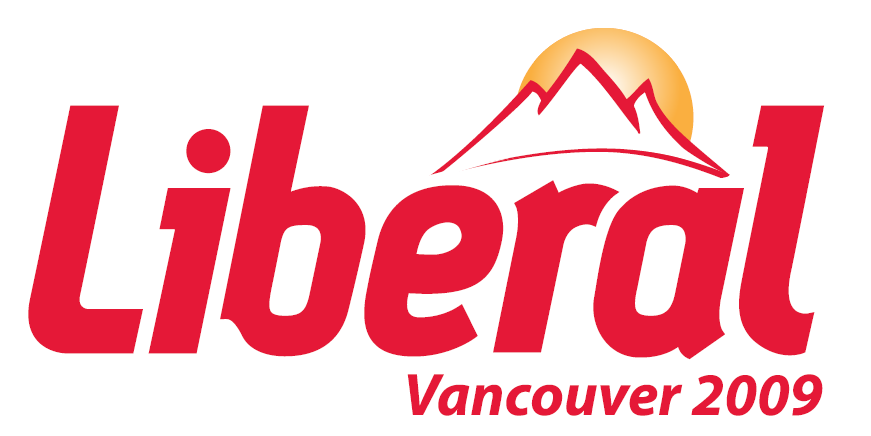
- Date: April 30 – May 2, 2009
- Convention: Vancouver Convention Centre; Vancouver, British Columbia
- Resigning leader: Stéphane Dion
- Won by: Michael Ignatieff
- Ballots: 1
- Candidates: 1
- Entrance fee: $90,000
- Spending limit: $1,500,000

In 2009, the Liberal Party of Canada held a leadership election to choose a successor to Stéphane Dion. The election was prompted by Dion's announcement that he would not lead the party into another election, following his party's defeat in the 2008 federal election in Canada. The Liberals had won 77 seats, maintaining its role as Official Opposition, but only captured just slightly over 26% of the total votes, their lowest percentage in the party's history to that date.

The party's national executive met on November 8, 2008, to set rules for the contest, and chose a date and location for the convention. A biennial and leadership convention was held in Vancouver, British Columbia from April 30 to May 3, 2009, with the new leader being chosen on May 2. Delegates to the convention were chosen from March 6–10, 2009, by those Liberal Party members who joined on or before February 6, 2009.

As a result of the 2008 Canadian parliamentary crisis, culminating in Conservative Prime Minister Stephen Harper's successful appeal on December 4, 2008, to Governor General Michaëlle Jean to prorogue Parliament until January 26, 2009, there were calls by a number of prominent Liberals, including Michael Ignatieff and Bob Rae, for the leadership election process to be accelerated, so that there would be an interim leader in place by the time that Parliament resumed. Former Deputy Prime Minister and former Finance Minister John Manley, writing in The Globe and Mail on December 6, 2008, called for Dion to resign immediately. Dion issued a statement on December 8 agreeing to move up his resignation.

Rae and Ignatieff disagreed on how to accelerate the process, with Ignatieff favouring a vote by caucus on December 10, 2008, to select an interim leader who would then be confirmed as permanent leader in May 2009, and Rae calling for a One Member One Vote method involving the entire Liberal Party membership, to be conducted in January 2009.

On December 8, 2008, Dominic LeBlanc withdrew from the race and threw his support to Michael Ignatieff. That evening the party executive agreed to a compromise proposal that would widen the leadership consultation process to include riding association presidents, defeated election candidates and others but rejected Rae's OMOV proposal. On December 9, 2008, Bob Rae withdrew from the race, leaving Michael Ignatieff as the presumed victor.

As well as ratifying Ignatieff's leadership with the support of 97% of delegates, the convention approved an amendment to the party's constitution to institute a One Member One Vote system for the election of future leaders. A proposal to adopt a weighted system where 25% of the vote in leadership elections would be reserved for members of the party's youth wing was defeated.

Exactly two years later, on May 2, 2011, Ignatieff and the Liberals suffered their worst defeat in history, winning only 34 seats and being reduced to third place in the election.

== Timeline ==
- October 14, 2008 - Federal election returns a Conservative minority government and a diminished Liberal caucus.
- October 15, 2008 - Joe Volpe calls for Stéphane Dion to resign as leader.
- October 20, 2008 - Liberal leader Stéphane Dion announces his intention to resign as party leader as of the Liberal leadership convention scheduled for May 2009.
- October 27, 2008 - Frank McKenna announces he will not be a candidate; LeBlanc declares his intention to run.
- October 31, 2008 - Rae announces his candidacy.
- November 4, 2008 - John Manley announces he will not run.
- November 8–9, 2008 - Liberal Party executive meets to decide on the date, location, and rules governing the race.
- November 11, 2008 - Martha Hall Findlay announces she will not run.
- November 12, 2008 - Gerard Kennedy and David McGuinty announce they will not run.
- November 13, 2008 - Ignatieff announces he will run.
- November 16, 2008 - The Liberal Party of Canada (Ontario) holds an all-candidates meeting. Rae boycotts when Ignatieff refused to allow the media to attend.
- November 20, 2008 - Rae officially launches his campaign.
- November 27, 2008 - The government tables a fiscal statement that angers the Opposition.
- November 28, 2008 - The Liberals table a motion of non-confidence in the government which states that there is an alternative government prepared to take power. Prime Minister Harper delays the motion from December 1 to December 8.
- December 1, 2008 - The Liberal Party, New Democratic Party and Bloc Québécois announce an agreement to defeat the government and replace it with a Liberal-NDP coalition.
- December 4, 2008 - On the advice of the Prime Minister, the Governor General prorogues parliament until January 26, 2009.
- December 6, 2008 - Former Deputy Prime Minister John Manley calls for Dion's immediate resignation.
- December 7, 2008 - Liberal caucus executive meets and decides to recommend an accelerated two-stage leadership selection process.
- December 8, 2008 - Stéphane Dion issues a statement announcing his resignation effective as soon as the party chooses an interim leader. Dominic LeBlanc drops out of the race and throws his support to Michael Ignatieff. Ignatieff announces that he will be a candidate for interim leader at the December 10 caucus meeting. 2006 Liberal leadership contender Gerard Kennedy endorses Bob Rae.
- December 8, 2008 - Liberal Party national executive meets to decide upon an expedited process for choosing an interim leader. They agree to a process that will choose an interim leader by December 17 and involve the caucus, riding association presidents, club and party commission presidents and defeated candidates.
- December 9, 2008 - Bob Rae withdraws from race, leaving Michael Ignatieff as the presumptive winner by default.
- December 10, 2008 - Michael Ignatieff is acclaimed interim Liberal leader by the party executive and caucus in consultation with riding presidents, defeated candidates and club presidents.
- February 6, 2009 - Deadline for new Liberal Party members to join the party if they wish to vote or run for convention delegate spots.
- March 6–10, 2009 - "Super delegate" weekend in which ridings elect convention delegates.
- April 30 – May 2, 2009 - Convention.
- (all times Pacific Daylight Time)
  - April 30
    - Council of Presidents Meeting
  - May 1
    - 8 am - Biennial Meetings of the Commissions
    - 11:30 am - 5 pm Policy Think Tanks and Election readiness workshops
    - 4 pm - Advance voting
    - 5 pm - Formal opening of convention
    - 5:20 pm - Speeches by candidates for party positions
    - 7 pm - Tribute to Stéphane Dion
  - May 2
    - 9 am - 11 am - Voting
    - 10:30 am – 2:30 pm - Amendments to party constitution debated
    - 2:30 pm - 4 pm - Voting result announced, Ignatieff addresses convention.

== Declared candidates ==
The following candidates declared their intention to run for the leadership:

=== Michael Ignatieff ===
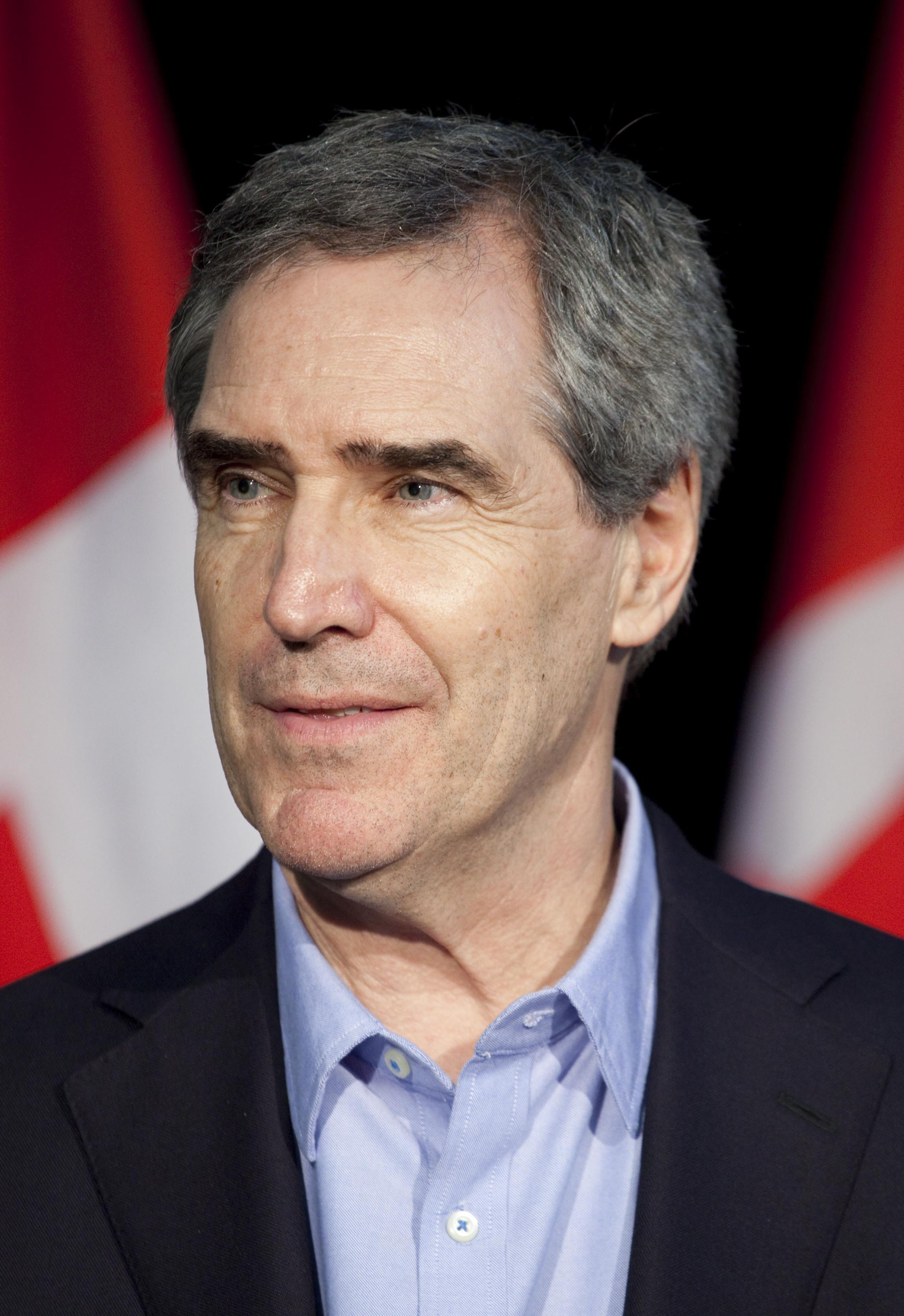
Michael Ignatieff

Michael Ignatieff, 62, was the Member of Parliament for Etobicoke—Lakeshore since 2006; former leadership front-runner in 2006 before being defeated by Stéphane Dion on the final ballot; Deputy Liberal Leader since 2006.

Date campaign launched: November 13, 2008
Campaign website: michaelignatieff.ca
Supporters
MPs: (46) Scott Andrews, Avalon; Larry Bagnell, Yukon; Navdeep Bains, Mississauga—Brampton South; Mauril Belanger, Ottawa—Vanier; Maurizio Bevilacqua, Vaughan; Gerry Byrne, Humber—St. Barbe—Baie Verte; John Cannis, Scarborough Centre; Siobhan Coady, St. John's South—Mount Pearl; Denis Coderre, Bourassa; Bonnie Crombie, Mississauga—Streetsville; Jean-Claude D'Amours, Madawaska—Restigouche; Sukh Dhaliwal, Newton—North Delta; Kirsty Duncan, Etobicoke North; Wayne Easter, Malpeque; Raymonde Folco, Laval—Les Îles; Judy Foote, Random—Burin—St. George's; Marc Garneau, Westmount—Ville-Marie; Albina Guarnieri, Mississauga East—Cooksville; Mark Holland, Ajax—Pickering; Andrew Kania, Brampton West; Jim Karygiannis, Scarborough—Agincourt; Dominic LeBlanc, Beauséjour; Derek Lee, Scarborough—Rouge River; Gurbax Malhi, Bramalea—Gore—Malton; Keith Martin, Esquimalt—Juan de Fuca; John McCallum, Markham—Unionville; David McGuinty, Ottawa South; John McKay, Scarborough-Guildwood; Dan McTeague, Pickering—Scarborough East; Maria Minna, Beaches—East York; Rob Oliphant, Don Valley West; Glen Pearson, London North Centre; Yasmin Ratansi, Don Valley East; Geoff Regan, Halifax West; Pablo Rodriguez, Honoré-Mercier; Todd Russell, Labrador; Francis Scarpaleggia, Lac-Saint-Louis; Mario Silva, Davenport; Scott Simms, Bonavista—Gander—Grand Falls—Windsor; Michelle Simson, Scarborough Southwest; Judy Sgro, York West; Paul Szabo, Mississauga South; Alan Tonks, York South—Weston; Frank Valeriote, Guelph; Bryon Wilfert, Richmond Hill; Lise Zarac, LaSalle—Émard
Past MPs: (1) Omar Alghabra, Mississauga—Erindale
Provincial politicians: (1) Dwight Duncan ON Minister of Finance and MPP for Windsor—Tecumseh
Senators: (2) Larry Campbell, David Smith
Other prominent individuals: (10) Liberal organizers Steven MacKinnon, Michael Eizenga, Mark Marissen, Warren Kinsella, and Don Guy; party executives Marc-André Blanchard, Brigitte Legault, and Ryan Ward; past candidates Tyler Banham and Penny Collenette

== Withdrawn candidates ==
=== Dominic LeBlanc ===
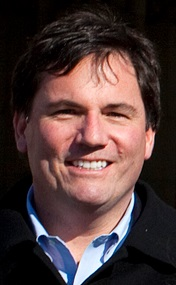
Dominic LeBlanc

Dominic LeBlanc, 41, was the Member of Parliament for Beauséjour since 2000, fluently bilingual Acadian with deep roots in the party. His father, Roméo, was press secretary to Pierre Trudeau, later an MP and cabinet minister, and eventually became Governor General. On October 27, LeBlanc became the first candidate to declare his candidacy for the Liberal Party leadership. On December 8, 2008, LeBlanc withdrew from the leadership race and endorsed Michael Ignatieff.

Date campaign launched: October 27, 2008
Date campaign ended: December 8, 2008
Supporters
Senators: (1) Percy Downe
Provincial politicians: (4) Victor Boudreau NB Minister of Finance and MLA for Shediac-Cap-Pelé; Greg Byrne NB Minister of Business New Brunswick and MLA for Fredericton-Lincoln; Shawn Graham NB Premier and MLA for Kent; Doug Tyler NB former Deputy Premier and former MLA for Grand Lake
Other prominent individuals: (5) party advisers and organizers Scott Reid, Tim Murphy, Steven Hogue, Mark Watton, and Janice Nicholson

=== Bob Rae ===
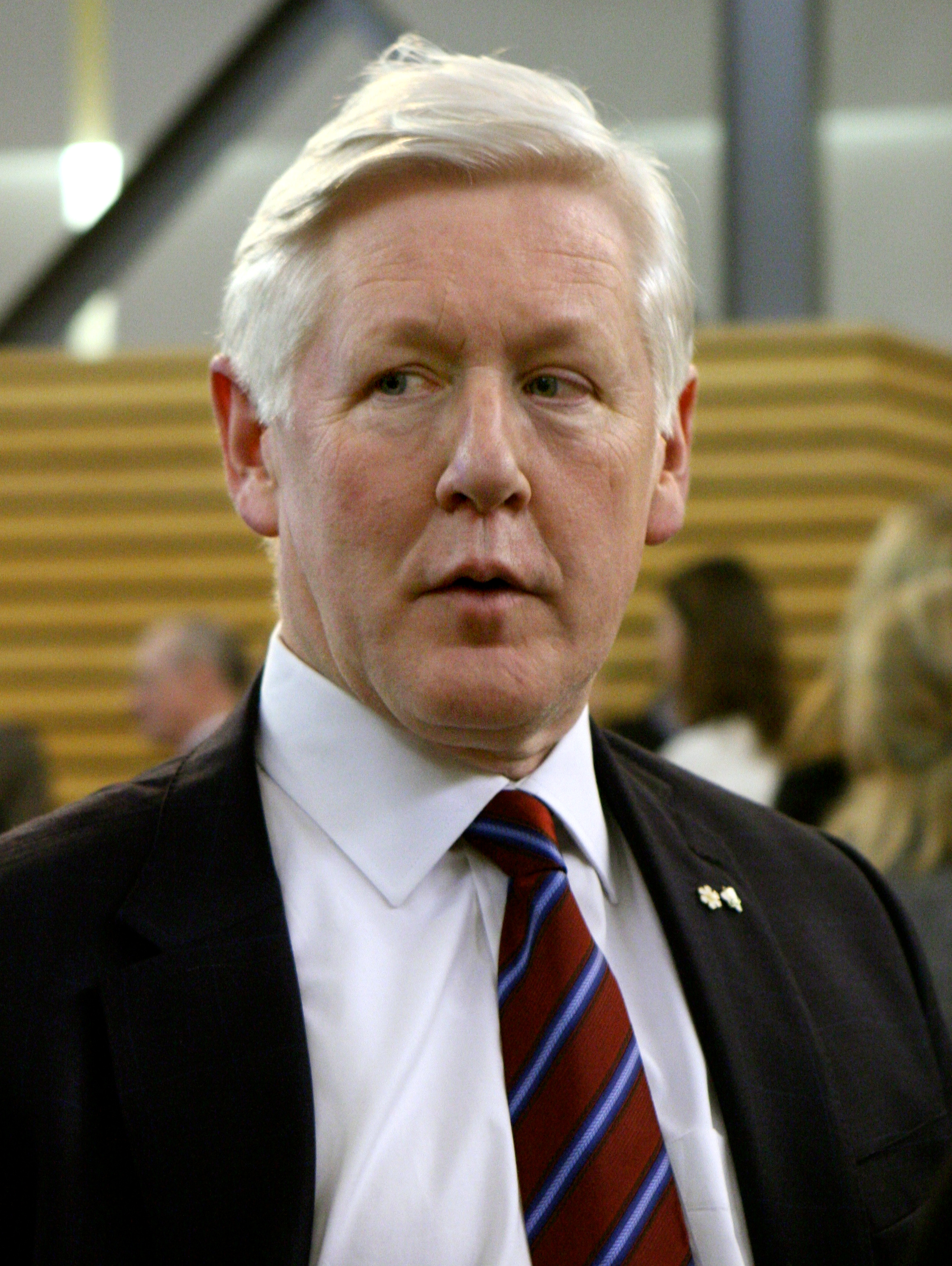
Bob Rae

Bob Rae, 60, had been the Member of Parliament for Toronto Centre since 2008; former Ontario New Democratic Party Premier of Ontario (1990-1995), NDP MP for Broadview-Greenwood (1979–1982); former federal Liberal leadership contender placing third in 2003. Rae had been under increasing pressure to bow out of the leadership contest. On December 9, 2008, Bob Rae officially withdrew from the race, leaving Michael Ignatieff the winner by default.

Date campaign launched: October 31, 2008
Date campaign ended: December 9, 2008
Supporters
MPs: (10) Hedy Fry, Vancouver Centre; Lawrence MacAulay, Cardigan; Shawn Murphy, Charlottetown; Michael Savage, Dartmouth—Cole Harbour; Alexandra Mendes, Brossard—La Prairie; Gerard Kennedy, Parkdale—High Park; Anita Neville, Winnipeg South Centre; Irwin Cotler, Mount Royal; Joe Volpe, Eglinton—Lawrence; Carolyn Bennett, St. Paul's
Past MPs: (6) Reg Alcock, Winnipeg South; Chris Axworthy, Saskatoon—Clark's Crossing; Lloyd Axworthy, Winnipeg North Centre; Raymond Chan, Richmond; Diane Marleau, Sudbury; Anne McLellan, Edmonton Centre
Senators: (15) Sharon Carstairs, Mobina Jaffer, Gerard Phalen, Joan Cook, William Rompkey, Peter Stollery, Mac Harb, Lorna Milne, Pierre De Bane, Serge Joyal, Michel Biron, Yoine Goldstein, Robert Peterson, Pierrette Ringuette, Raymond Setlakwe
Past Senators: (1) Jack Austin
Provincial politicians: (4) Gulzar Singh Cheema MB former MLA for Kildonan and BC former Minister of State for Immigration and Multicultural Services and former MLA for Surrey-Panorama Ridge; Kevin Lamoureux MB MLA for Inkster; George Smitherman ON Deputy Premier, Minister of Energy and Infrastructure, and MPP for Toronto Centre; Greg Sorbara ON former Minister of Finance and MPP for Vaughan;
Other prominent individuals: (12) Jonathan Goldbloom, Montreal communications consultant; Karl Littler, former senior Paul Martin strategist; John Duffy, Martin strategist, political author, and consultant; Power Corporation executive and former Chrétien advisor John A. Rae; former Young Liberals of Canada President Richard Diamond, Nick Taylor, Colin MacDonald, Roy Bluehorn, Monica Lysak, Walter Noel, Ronald St.-Onge Lynch, Jake Gray.

== Potential candidates who did not run ==
- Navdeep Bains: Member of Parliament for Mississauga—Brampton South; when Bains was elected for the first time in 2004 he was the youngest Liberal MP in Parliament. Reported to be backing Ignatieff.
- Scott Brison: Member of Parliament for Kings-Hants. First elected as a Progressive Conservative in 1997. Crossed the floor to the Liberals in 2003 and served as Minister of Public Works from 2004 to 2006. Former Liberal leadership contender.
- Martin Cauchon: Former Member of Parliament (1993-2004). Former Minister of Justice. "While my heart says yes, the realities of fundraising and organization are too daunting at this time."
- Denis Coderre: Member of Parliament for Bourassa since 1997, federal cabinet minister from 2002 to 2006. «Je ne serai pas candidat à la prochaine course au leadership. J'ai le goût d'être chef du parti et je pense avoir les capacités pour être chef du parti, mais, comme dit la chanson, "I have the right love at the wrong moment".»
- Ruby Dhalla: Member of Parliament for Brampton—Springdale since 2004. On November 18, she was reported saying "I am currently consulting with supporters and senior Liberals from coast to coast as to what the future holds. I will be making my decision public in the near future." A month later, the Brampton Guardian reported she will not be a candidate and quoted her saying "Taking a lot of factors into consideration, I realized this wasn't the right time for myself."
- Ujjal Dosanjh: Member of Parliament for Vancouver South since 2004. Federal Minister of Health from 2004 to 2006. Former NDP Premier of British Columbia. Said on November 6 on Mike Duffy Live that due to his lack of French, a bid by him would be "unrealistic."
- Ken Dryden: Member of Parliament for York Centre. Former federal Minister of Social Development, and former leadership contender. Former National Hockey League goaltender whose playing career won a place for him in the Hockey Hall of Fame.
- Martha Hall Findlay: Member of Parliament for Willowdale; First elected in 2008; Former leadership contender. She said the fact that she still owes about $170,000 from the last leadership contest "played a big role" in her decision to not run this time.
- Gerard Kennedy: Member of Parliament for Parkdale—High Park; first elected in 2008; former Ontario Education minister; former leadership contender.
- John Manley: Former Member of Parliament and former Deputy Prime Minister under Jean Chrétien released an announcement saying "I found that there was indeed water in the pool.... However, I truly found that in my mind and heart, I have moved on from the world of elected office. I also found that I lacked the burning ambition necessary to mount and sustain such a campaign."
- Elizabeth May: Green Party of Canada leader, in response to rumours of a Draft May movement, May said "The Green Party is my home and the Green party is where I'll stay."
- Dalton McGuinty, Premier of Ontario, says he'll stay out of the Liberal leadership race and won't endorse any candidate with the exception of his brother David if he ran.
- David McGuinty: Member of Parliament for Ottawa South, first elected in 2004. Younger brother of Ontario Premier Dalton McGuinty. Says he wishes to focus on his duties as an MP
- Frank McKenna: The former Premier of New Brunswick, as well as the former ambassador to the US, has said "Although I have been deeply moved by expressions of support for me from across the country, I have not been persuaded to change my long-standing resolve to exit public life for good."
- Carole Taylor, former British Columbia Liberal Party Finance Minister, said "I'm appreciative of the nice comments that have been made, but I'm not intending to run for the federal leadership."
- Brian Tobin: Former Premier of Newfoundland & Labrador & federal cabinet minister said in London that he will "absolutely not," consider running for Liberal leadership.
- Justin Trudeau told a national news agency "I can assure you that if there is a leadership (race) right now I will not be running for any leadership role."
- Joe Volpe: Member of Parliament for Eglinton-Lawrence First elected in 1988. Former Ontario Cabinet Minister; former leadership contender. "I was delighted to be a candidate," Volpe said. "It did not turn out well in part because people tried to frame me into a discussion regarding me that had nothing to do with policy issues. I'm not sure I want to go through that experience again."

== Results ==
First ballot
Candidate	Delegate count	Percentage
Michael Ignatieff	1,964	97%
Spoiled ballots	59	3%
Total	2,023	100%

Delegate count
Ignatieff	97.08%
Spoilt ballots	2.92%
