= Paul M. Taylor =

Canadian food-security activist

Paul Taylor
- Born: Toronto, Canada
- Occupations: Executive director, consultant, community-builder, university instructor
- Political party: New Democratic Party

Paul M. Taylor (born 1982) is a Canadian food security & anti-racism activist and former executive director of FoodShare Toronto. He is currently the co-CEO of Evenings & Weekends Consulting.

In 2020, Taylor and colleagues delivered 20,232 free food boxes to food-insecure people in Toronto. In 2022, he announced that his organization would pay interviewed job applicants $75 for their time.

Taylor ran for election as the federal member of parliament for Parkdale—High Park twice.

== Early life ==
Taylor was born in Toronto in 1982, the second son to a mother from Saint Kitts; they grew up in a household that was reliant on government financial support. Paul attended Jarvis CI and was school president (2000-2001), he attended York University and was active in undergraduate politics, supporting the disenfranchised and politically underrepresented.

== Career ==
Taylor was previously the executive director of Gordon Neighbourhood House, and in 2017 he became the executive director of FoodShare Toronto. In the role he is known for drawing links between food security and racism. At the start of the COVID-19 pandemic he delivered 20,232 free food boxes to Canadians with food insecurity. In March 2022, he announced that FoodShare Toronto would pay all employees a living wage and pay all interviewed job applicants $75.

Taylor teaches at Simon Fraser University. He serves on the British Columbia board of directors of Canadian Centre for Policy Alternatives and has previously served on the board of directors of Metro Vancouver Alliance and Food Secure Canada. He is the founder of the Vancouver Food Summit and the co-chair of British Columbia's Poverty Reduction Coalition.

Taylor ran for election as the New Democratic Party candidate for Parkdale—High Park in 2019 and 2021, finishing second both times to incumbent Arif Virani. Taylor notably tightened the gap between him and Virani from 15.9 percentage point difference in 2019 to just 3.2 percentage point difference in 2021. Taylor announced on social media that he would not run in the next federal election.

== Electoral record ==
2021 Canadian federal election: Parkdale—High Park
Party	Candidate	Votes	%	±%	Expenditures
Liberal	Arif Virani	22,307	42.45	-4.94	$104,400.40
New Democratic	Paul M. Taylor	20,602	39.21	+7.71	$106,004.63
Conservative	Nestor Sanajko	6,815	12.97	-0.19	$9,183.25
People's	Wilfried Richard Alexander Danzinger	1,642	3.13	+2.07	$724.84
Green	Diem Marchand-Lafortune	957	1.82	-4.61	$3,873.90
Marijuana	Terry Parker	130	0.25	+0.05	$0.00
Marxist–Leninist	Lorne Gershuny	90	0.17	+0.10	$0.00
Total valid votes/expense limit		52,543	–	–	$110,699.74
Total rejected ballots					
Turnout		52,543	65.46		
Eligible voters		80,265			
Liberal hold		Swing		-6.33	
Source: Elections Canada

2019 Canadian federal election: Parkdale—High Park
Party	Candidate	Votes	%	±%	Expenditures
Liberal	Arif Virani	28,852	47.4	+5.36	$104,265.06
New Democratic	Paul M. Taylor	19,180	31.5	-8.74	$100,698.11
Conservative	Adam Pham	8,015	13.2	+0.15	$44,890.73
Green	Nick Capra	3,916	6.4	+3.42	$14,108.37
People's	Greg Wycliffe	643	1.1	-	none listed
Communist	Alykhan Pabani	119	0.2	-	$626.57
Marijuana	Terry Parker	119	0.2	-0.13	none listed
Marxist–Leninist	Lorne Gershuny	43	0.07	-0.1	none listed
Total valid votes/expense limit		60,887	100.0		
Total rejected ballots		382			
Turnout		61,269	74.0		
Eligible voters		82,797			
Liberal hold		Swing		+7.05	
Source: Elections Canada
