= FoodShare Toronto =

Canadian food-security organization

- Formation: 1985
- Purpose: Community food security
- Headquarters: Toronto
- Executive Director: Matt Johnstone
- Website: https://foodshare.net/

FoodShare Toronto is a Toronto-based Canadian not for profit organization that delivers programs that address hunger and advocates for better policy from government. In addition to advocacy, programs include delivery of food boxes, supporting urban farming, and operating a telephone hot line.

The organisation was founded in 1985 and employs over 100 staff. It is known for its progressive approach to employee rights.

== Organization ==
FoodShare was launched in 1985 by Toronto Mayor Art Eggleton during his election campaign. Eggleton envisioned an organisation that would help people coordinate between food-security support organizations.

As of 2021, the organization employed over 100 staff, and in 2020 it has revenue of $10.7 million. The board of directors includes Rosie Mensah. Paul Taylor was hired as FoodShare's Executive Director in April 2017.

== Organisational practises ==
Since March 2022, the organization pays every interviewed job candidate $75 for their time. As of 2022, all staff were paid $24 per hour, in order to keep them above the Toronto living wage rate of $22.04 per hour. The organization has a policy that the highest paid employee cannot make any more than three times the rate the lowest paid employee receives.

In 2021, FoodShare urged CharityVillage to require salary information on job postings.

== Programs ==
=== Phone line ===
FoodShare's initial (1985) activity was running the Hunger Hotline, which was later rebranded as FoodLink in an effort to better convey the organizations shift in focus away from charitable support for individuals towards a more political systems change ambition.

=== Food boxes ===
FoodShare launched its Good Food Box program in 1993. The program delivers fresh food boxes to food insecure households. Food boxes have been delivered weekly or every two weeks at different times in the program's history. The program initially procured the food at the Ontario Food Terminal before switching to buying from local farmers. Kathryn Scharf, writing a chapter in the 1999 book For Hunger-proof Cities noted that the Good Food Box program was different from comparable food box programs because of its focus on systems change, rather than the usual more charitable focus on individual households.

FoodShare runs a food box delivery program called The Food Rx Program in collaboration with University Health Network. Participants in the program are provided with a box of fresh food every two weeks.

=== Farming ===
In 2021, FoodShare helped launch Flemo Farm, an initiative to help under-represented community members engage in urban agriculture.

=== Advocacy ===
FoodShare advocates to municipal, provincial and federal levels of government for progressive interventions that advanced food security.

== See also ==
- Food security
- Community food security
- Indigenous food security in Canada
