= Marijuana Party candidates in the 2008 Canadian federal election =

The Marijuana Party fielded eight candidates in the 2008 federal election :

1. Moffat, Michael (Radical Marijuana) - Saint John
2. Longley, Blair T. (Radical Marijuana) - Hochelaga
3. Parker, Terry (Radical Marijuana) - Parkdale—High Park
4. Akpata, John Andrew (Radical Marijuana) - Ottawa Centre
5. Klevering, Kornelis (Radical Marijuana) - Guelph
6. Rathwell, Ernest Oliver (Radical Marijuana) - Lanark—Frontenac—Lennox and Addington
7. Carrière, Denis Andrew (Radical Marijuana) - Thunder Bay—Superior North
8. Felger, Tim (Radical Marijuana) - Abbotsford

The results were as follows:

- 8 Candidates; 2,319 total votes.
- Average votes: 0.59% per Candidate.
- Of total vote: 0.017% of national votes.

== See also ==
- Marijuana Party candidates in the 2006 Canadian federal election
- Marijuana Party candidates in the 2011 Canadian federal election
