= Marijuana Party candidates in the 2006 Canadian federal election =

Changes to Canadian elections law in 2004 closed "Longley's Loophole". This court decision resulted in the loss of funding for the Parti Marijuana Party and other small parties. The Marijuana Party fielded twenty-three candidates in the 2006 federal election receiving a total of nine-thousand two-hundred and seventy-five votes, averaging (0.82%) across the 23 ridings fielding candidates. In Nunavut, Ed Devries won 7.9% of the vote finishing in fourth place, ahead of the Green Party candidate. Party leader Blair Longley received 332 votes (0.72%) finishing fifth out of six candidates in the Montreal riding of Hochelaga.

== Prince Edward Island ==
=== Charlottetown: Andrew J Chisholm ===
Chisholm listed his occupation as a Call Center Tech Support in the 2006 campaign. He received 193 votes (1.01%) finishing fifth out of six candidates.

== Nova Scotia ==
=== Kings-Hants: Chummy Anthony ===
Anthony received 436 votes (1.0%) finishing fifth out of six candidates.

== Quebec ==
=== Hochelaga: Blair T Longley ===
Party leader Blair Longley, received 332 votes (0.72%) finishing fifth out of six candidates. He ran previously as Parti Marijuana Party leader in the 2004 general election for the BC riding of North Okanagan—Shuswap earning 492 votes (0.95%). Longley ran again in the Hochelaga riding during the 2008 federal election listing himself as unemployed, receiving 183 votes (0.4%)

Listed as a Thinker, Longley previously ran twice in the Vancouver Quadra riding during the 1984 and 1988 general elections. He received 364 votes (0.62%) as Green candidate in 1984, and received 52 votes (0.1%) as an independent in 1988.

=== Rosemont—La Petite-Patrie: Hugô St-Onge ===
St-Onge, a Gardener, was one vote shy of 420, earning 419 votes (0.8%) finishing sixth out of six candidates.

=== Trois-Rivières: Paul Giroux ===
Giroux listed his occupation as Father in 2000 and Driver in 2006. He received 371 votes (0.76%) finishing sixth out of six candidates. Giroux received 547 votes (1.17%) in the 2004 federal election, and 1020 votes (2.26%) in the 2000 federal election.

=== Longueuil—Pierre-Boucher: David Fiset ===
Fiset listed his occupation as Philosopher in 2000, Educator in 2004, and Horticulturalist in 2006. Fiset received 397 votes (0.8%) finishing sixth out of six candidates. Fiset received 401 votes (0.83%) in the 2004 federal election, and 968 votes (2.42%) in the 2000 federal election.

=== Laurier—Sainte-Marie: Nicky Tanguay ===
Tanguay listed her occupation as Paper Carrier. Tanguay received 338 votes (0.69%) finishing sixth out of nine candidates in the riding won by Bloc Quebecois leader Gilles Duceppe. Tanguay received 572 votes (1.2%) in the 2004 federal election.

== Ontario ==
=== Carleton—Mississippi Mills: George Walter Kolaczynski ===
Kolaczysnki listed himself as a postal worker in the 2004 campaign. He was the only candidate in the riding to run a $0 campaign. He finished fifth of six candidate with 426 votes (0.61%) with the riding being won by Gordon O'Connor. Kolaczysnki ran previously in the Lanark—Frontenac—Lennox and Addington riding (won by Scott Reid) during the 2004 general election, winning 479 votes (0.85%).

=== Lanark—Frontenac—Lennox and Addington: Ernest Rathwell ===
Rathwell was born on November 26, 1958, in Carleton Place, Ontario. He later moved to Alberta to work in the oilpatch for five years, and spent five additional years working at a sour gas factory. He has a Fourth Class Stationary Engineering certificate from the Southern Alberta Institute of Technology.

He credits marijuana for helping him come to terms with post-traumatic stress syndrome, arguing that conventional treatments did not work for him (Ottawa Citizen, 10 June 1998). His wife also has multiple sclerosis, and Rathwell believes that marijuana use has kept her alive by causing the condition to subside. He joined the Marijuana Party after he was denied a certificate to grow marijuana for medical purposes and sentenced to nine months in jail for illegal cultivation.

He received 501 votes (0.84%), finishing sixth against Conservative incumbent Scott Reid.

=== Oxford: James Bender ===
James Bender (born 1964) earned 771 votes (1.55%), the most of any Parti Marijuana Party candidate, finishing sixth of seven candidates. Running previously in the riding during the 2004 general election he received 794 votes (1.73%). Bender is self made, formerly operating Lady Godiva's in Woodstock, Ontario, as well as former operator of "The Ganja Tree" in Woodstock, Ontario. Bender has been involved in social protest for many years in several areas. He is a proponent of legal marijuana, regulated by the government with similar control and distribution mechanisms in place in order to stabilize the industry, removing it from the paradigm of criminality. At present he is working on a pesticide ban, the redirecting of a golf course, (in order to protect a wetland area) and is a member of the Trans National Radical Party which holds NGO in consultant status with the United Nations.

Bender regularly contributes to many national and local newspapers as an opinion writer. He operates an online newspaper known as the Woodstock Ontario Independent News. He was awarded the Community Care and Access "Heroes in the Home Award", receiving commendation from Ontario Premier Dalton McGuinty, as well as many other government officials and leaders for his role in arguing a human rights case involving summer access to camp programs for disabled children against the city of Woodstock, Ontario, which he subsequently won.

Bender ran unsuccessfully for city council in Woodstock, Ontario, in the November 2006 municipal elections. He garnered 2023 votes (6.4%). Bender also ran in the 2007 Ontario general elections as an Independent candidate, coming in fourth place ahead of the Family Coalition, a branch of the Christian Heritage Party. He won a total vote count of 632 votes, casting himself as a social liberal, fiscal conservative. Bender has organized and registered with Elections Canada, the Oxford Marijuana Party, effective February, 2007. He lives in Woodstock with his partner and two children, one of whom is autistic.

=== Ottawa-Centre: John Andrew Akpata ===
Poet, John Akpata received 387 votes (0.58%) finishing sixth out of nine candidates. He received 495 votes (0.84%) in the Ottawa-South riding in the 2004 federal election.

=== Peterborough: Aiden Wiechula ===
Aiden Wiechula was born on November 10, 1985, in Halifax, Nova Scotia, and lived in Waterloo, Ontario; Saudi Arabia; and Vancouver Island, British Columbia, before moving to Peterborough to attend Trent University. He was a member of the New Democratic Party before joining the Marijuana Party and was a twenty-year-old History student at the time of the 2006 election. When he declared his candidacy, he was quoted as saying, "The cannabis issue is a great example of everything the government has mishandled and done wrong. It [voting for the Marijuana Party] is a great protest vote against bigger party mentality."

Wiechula was on the left wing of the Marijuana Party. He has said that he became interested in politics via an opposition to the American invasion of Iraq. During the 2006 campaign, he called for free community college courses and for university student tuition fees to be cut in half. He denied that this would result in a lower quality of education, pointing to the example of low tuition fees in Quebec.

Wiechula received 455 votes (0.72%) on election, finishing fifth against Conservative candidate Dean Del Mastro. He later joked that he had fulfilled his goal of receiving more votes than his father, Marek Wiechula, who received 204 votes as a Libertarian Party candidate in the 1975 Ontario provincial election.

In 2009, Wiechula wrote a piece defending the political legacy of J.S. Woodsworth, founder of the Co-operative Commonwealth Federation.

=== Parkdale—High Park: Terry Parker ===
Marijuana advocate, Terry Parker received 311 votes (0.58%) finishing fifth out of eight candidates. Parker also ran in this riding in the 2000 and 2004 general elections. In 2000 he received 711 votes (1.85%) and in 2004 received 384 votes for (0.82%). He ran again in the riding in 2008 earning 209 votes (0.43%).

=== Nickel Belt: Michel D. Ethier ===
Minister of the Church of the Universe Ethier received, just over 420 votes. His 421 votes (0.92%) put him sixth of seven candidates.

=== Thunder Bay—Rainy River: Doug Thompson ===
Thompson received 424 votes (1.1%) finishing fifth of five candidates. In the 2004 election he received 547 votes (1.51%) in the riding.

=== Thunder Bay—Superior North: Denis Carriere ===
Denis Carriere received 486 votes (1.25%) finishing fifth of five candidates.

== Alberta ==
=== Edmonton-Strathcona: Dave Dowling ===
Dowling received 390 votes (0.74%) finishing sixth out of seven candidates. He received 519 votes (1.07%) in the riding during the 2004 federal election.

=== Calgary Southwest: Logan Marshall ===
Marshall finished sixth of six candidates in the riding won by Stephen Harper. He did not receive any votes, likely due to missed filing deadline.

== British Columbia ==
=== Abbotsford: Tim Felger ===
Felger received 334 votes (0.71%) finishing fifth of seven candidates.

=== Pitt Meadows—Maple Ridge—Mission: Dean Banov ===
Banov received 327 votes (0.63%) finishing fifth of seven candidates.

=== Vancouver Centre: Heathcliff Dionysus Campbell ===
Heathcliff Dionysus Campbell received 259 votes (0.45%) finishing sixth of seven candidates.

=== Vancouver Quadra: Marc Boyer ===
Boyer received 158 votes (0.27%) finishing sixth of seven candidates.

=== Victoria: Fred Mallach ===
Mallach won 311 votes (0.5%) finishing fifth of seven candidates.

== Nunavut ==
=== Nunavut: Ed Devries ===
Devries received 724 votes (7.9%) finishing fourth out of five candidates. He received the largest percentage of votes amongst 2006 Parti Marijuana Party candidates.

== See also ==
- Marijuana Party candidates in the 2004 Canadian federal election
- Marijuana Party candidates in the 2008 Canadian federal election
