= Marijuana Party candidates in the 2000 Canadian federal election =

The Marijuana Party fielded over 70 candidates in the 2000 federal election, none of whom were elected. Each candidate needed 100 signatures from voters for their nomination papers to be accepted. This was a difficult threshold for a fledgling political party such as Marijuana to meet. Information about some of these candidates may be found on this page.

== Ontario ==
=== Tim Berg (London North Centre) ===
Berg received 453 votes, finishing sixth behind Liberal incumbent Joe Fontana. Berg was personally interested in cannabis legalization due to its potential as an analgesic to relieve chronic pain that he suffered from a 1983 skydiving accident. He crushed a heel and broke a vertebra in the accident, and felt that marijuana would be better for managing pain than prescription drugs with their debilitating side effects. Berg acknowledged that none of Marijuana's candidates, himself included, were likely to win office but wanted to publicize the party's proposals for legalizing marijuana for medical purposes while preserving health and safety.

=== Paul Lewin (Trinity—Spadina) ===
Lewin received 673 votes, finishing fifth against Liberal incumbent Tony Ianno. He later campaigned as the Province of Toronto Party's candidate for Mayor of Toronto.
