= Ontario Food Terminal =

Produce distribution centre in Toronto, Ontario, Canada

Coordinates: 43.628732°N 79.485397°W

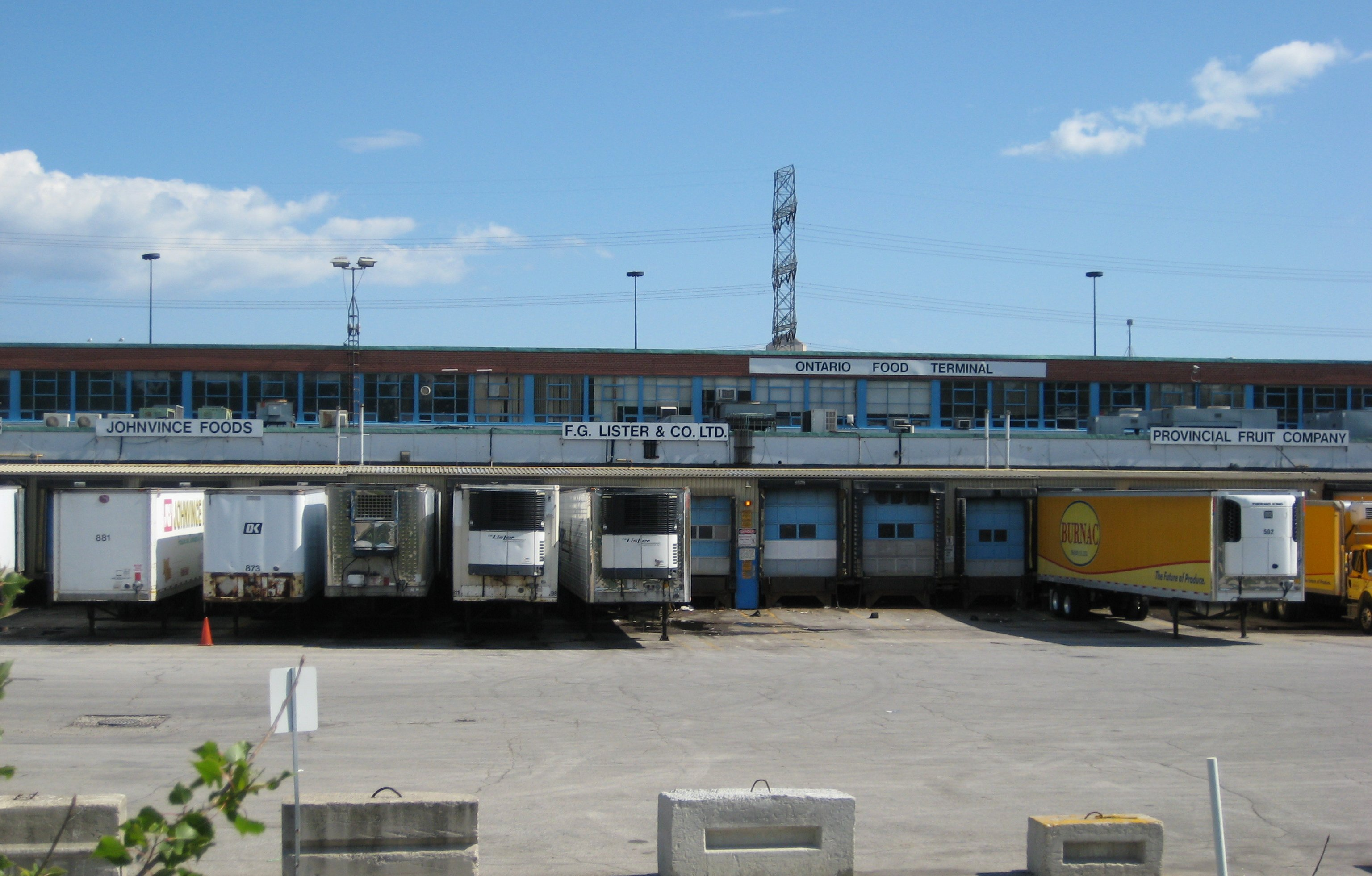
The Ontario Food Terminal

The Ontario Food Terminal is the main produce distribution centre for Toronto, Ontario, Canada. It is located at 165 The Queensway at Park Lawn Road, north of the Gardiner Expressway, and west of the Humber River. The U-shaped building occupies 1,740,000 square feet (162,000 m^{2}) of a 40 acres (16 ha) site and includes 80,000 square feet (7,400 m^{2}) of cold storage and is open 24 hours a day, 365 days a year for deliveries. Annually some one million vehicles arrive at the centre delivering produce from across North America or leave to distribute it to stores and restaurants across the city. It is the largest such facility in Canada, and the third largest in North America after those in Chicago and Los Angeles.

== History ==
The Ontario Food Terminal was completed in June 1954 and replaced the Wholesale Fruit Market located west of St. Lawrence Market at The Esplanade. The land had been purchased in 1946 but plans to build on the site were shelved in 1950 due to the scarcity of building materials. It cost $3 million and took two years to build. The architects were Shore and Moffat and Soules Construction Limited built the facility. It included space for 400 trucks.

Previously the main distribution centre for Toronto was located in buildings in the five-acre block of King Street East, Market Street, Front Street and Church Street, northwest of the St. Lawrence Market market building. In 1954, it was considered one of the most congested car and truck parking districts in downtown Toronto. Fifty-six wholesale and related firms moved to the new terminal from the old block.

When it opened, most shipments arrived by rail with tracks branching off the Canadian National Railway line on the east and south sides of the complex, but the rail tracks have since been removed and today most arrive by truck, while some are flown in via nearby Pearson Airport and delivered via Highway 427 and the Gardiner Expressway. The fruits and vegetables are shipped to the terminal from Ontario farms as well as more distant locales such as Florida, California, and Mexico. At the terminal, local buyers meet the sellers and negotiate prices. It is thus the main market for establishing produce prices in the region. The majority of the produce eaten in Toronto moves through the terminal, though some of the largest grocery store chains such as Loblaws contract directly with growers and do not use it.

The Ontario Food Terminal is owned and operated by the Ontario Food Terminal Board, an agency under the Ontario Ministry of Agriculture, Food and Rural Affairs. The Ontario Food Terminal Board leases space in the market to vendors and distribution companies. The board members are appointed by the provincial government, legally through the Lieutenant Governor of Ontario on recommendation from the Minister of Agriculture and Food. The terminal is entirely self-funded from fees charged to the users of the facility.

Normally, The Ontario Food Terminal is not open to the public and is a wholesale-only facility. However, on September 22, 2012, it opened its doors for Fresh Fest a community event which offered entertainment, cooking demonstrations, food and informational exhibits. On May 25, 2013, it hosted a second similar event called Taste of the Food Terminal which benefited FoodShare Toronto, a not-for-profit charity organization which focuses on providing healthy food to low-income communities in Toronto.
