= Marijuana Party candidates in the 2004 Canadian federal election =

The Marijuana Party fielded a number of candidates in the 2004 federal election, none of whom were elected. Information about these candidates may be found here.

== Quebec ==
=== Beauport: Nicolas Frichot ===
Nicolas Frichot was born in 1967 in Geneva, Switzerland, and later relocated to the Quebec City area of Canada. A photographer, filmmaker, and visual artist by trade, he has served on the boards of Mainfilm and l’association lafriche. In 2009, he was a student at Université Laval.

Elected as a school commissioner in 2007, Frichot has also sought election to public office at the federal, provincial, and municipal levels. He called for the closure of Quebec City's incinerator in 2009, describing it as a major source of pollution in the city.

Electoral record
Election	Division	Party	Votes	%	Place	Winner
2003 provincial	Jean-Lesage	Bloc Pot	390	1.11	5/6	Michel Després, Liberal
2004 federal	Beauport	Marijuana	585	1.26	6/6	Christian Simard, Bloc Québécois
2007 School Board	Capitale, Ward Ten	RESPECT	128	55.65	1/2	himself
2009 municipal	Quebec City, Council, Maizerets-Lairet	Défi Vert	648	10.18	3/4	Ginette Picard-Lavoie

=== Richelieu: Daniel Blackburn ===
Daniel Blackburn has been a candidate for public office at the federal, provincial and municipal levels, sometimes using the names Black D Blackburn or Blak D Blackburn. He identified himself as a television producer in 2004. While running for municipal office in 2005, he blamed prohibition and Sûreté du Québec tactics for creating a culture of violence within the local cannabis economy.

Electoral record
Election	Division	Party	Votes	%	Place	Winner
2000 federal	Bas-Richelieu—Nicolet—Bécancour	Marijuana	901	2.03	5/6	Louis Plamondon, Bloc Québécois
2003 provincial	Nicolet-Yamaska	Bloc Pot	417	1.59	4/5	Michel Morin, Parti Québécois
2004 federal	Richelieu	Marijuana	580	1.19	6/6	Louis Plamondon, Bloc Québécois
2005 municipal	Bécancour town council, Poste 6	Option Vert	354	8.64	3/3	Alain Lévesque

=== Saint-Laurent—Cartierville: Alex Néron ===
Alexandre (Alex) Néron has a certificate in screenwriting from the University of Quebec at Montreal and has worked an independent videographer in Montreal. A founding member of the Marijuana Party, he has run in three federal and two provincial elections.

Electoral record
Election	Division	Party	Votes	%	Place	Winner
1998 Quebec provincial	Rosement	Bloc Pot	296	1.01	4/7	Rita Dionne-Marsolais, Parti Québécois
Canadian federal by-election, 11 September 2000	Kings—Hants	N/A (Marijuana)	670	2.47	4/5	Joe Clark, Progressive Conservative
2000 Canadian federal	Hochelaga—Maisonneuve	Marijuana	1,227	2.84	5/8	Réal Ménard, Bloc Québécois
2003 Quebec provincial	Hochelaga-Maisonneuve	Bloc Pot	476	2.02	5/8	Louise Harel, Parti Québécois
2004 Canadian federal	Saint-Laurent—Cartierville	Marijuana	298	0.71	6/9	Stéphane Dion, Liberal

== Ontario ==
=== Lanark—Frontenac—Lennox and Addington: George Walter Kolaczynski ===
Kolaczynski received 479 votes (0.85%), finishing sixth against the winner of the riding Conservative candidate Scott Reid.

== Manitoba ==
=== Charleswood—St. James: Dan Zupansky ===
Zupansky has described himself as a business owner and salesperson. He was the host of a news-radio program on UMFM at the time of the election, and still holds this position as of 2005. He received 337 votes (0.80%), finishing fifth against the winner of the riding Conservative candidate Steven Fletcher.

=== Elmwood—Transcona: Gavin Whittaker ===
Whittaker has been a candidate of both the Marijuana Party of Canada and the Libertarian Party of Manitoba. He organized public screenings of the Rocky Horror Picture Show in Winnipeg during the 1990s and took part in a pro-marijuana rally outside the Legislative Assembly of Manitoba in 1999. In 2004, he listed his occupation as "sales representative" in 2004. His partner, Rebecca Whittaker, has also been a Marijuana Party candidate.

Electoral record
Election	Division	Party	Votes	%	Place	Winner
2003 provincial	Elmwood	Libertarian	67	1.12	4/4	Jim Maloway, New Democratic Party
2004 federal	Elmwood—Transcona	Marijuana	311	1.06	6/7	Bill Blaikie, New Democratic Party

=== Kildonan—St. Paul: Rebecca Whittaker ===
Rebecca Whittaker (born in Kenora, Ontario) listed herself as an administrative assistant in 2004. She received 290 votes (0.80%), finishing fifth against Conservative candidate Joy Smith. Her partner, Gavin Whittaker, has also been a Marijuana Party candidate.
