= Green Party of Canada candidates in the 1993 Canadian federal election =

The Green Party of Canada ran seventy-one candidates in the 1993 federal election, none of whom were elected. Information about these candidates may be found here.

The page also includes information about Green Party candidates in by-elections between 1993 and 1997.

== Candidates ==
=== Parkdale—High Park: Richard Roy ===
Richard Roy was an executive secretary at the time of the election. His campaign seems to have been based on eco-capitalist lines. A newspaper article from the period cites him as favouring the following policies: retrofitting energy-inefficient buildings, providing financial incentives for organic farmers and reducing or eliminating income taxes (Toronto Star, 22 October 1993). Roy received 430 votes (1.05%), finishing sixth against Liberal incumbent Jesse Flis.

In 2002, Roy wrote that Ontario's composting policies left open the possibility for E. coli contamination in the province's produce (Toronto Star, 17 September 2002).

== Candidates in subsequent by-elections ==
=== Brome—Missisquoi, 13 February 1995: Éric Ferland ===
Éric Ferland was the leader of the Green Party of Quebec at the time of the election. He received 101 votes (0.27%), finishing eighth against Liberal Party candidate Denis Paradis.
