= Peggy Nash =

Canadian politician and labour educator (born 1951)

Peggy Nash CM
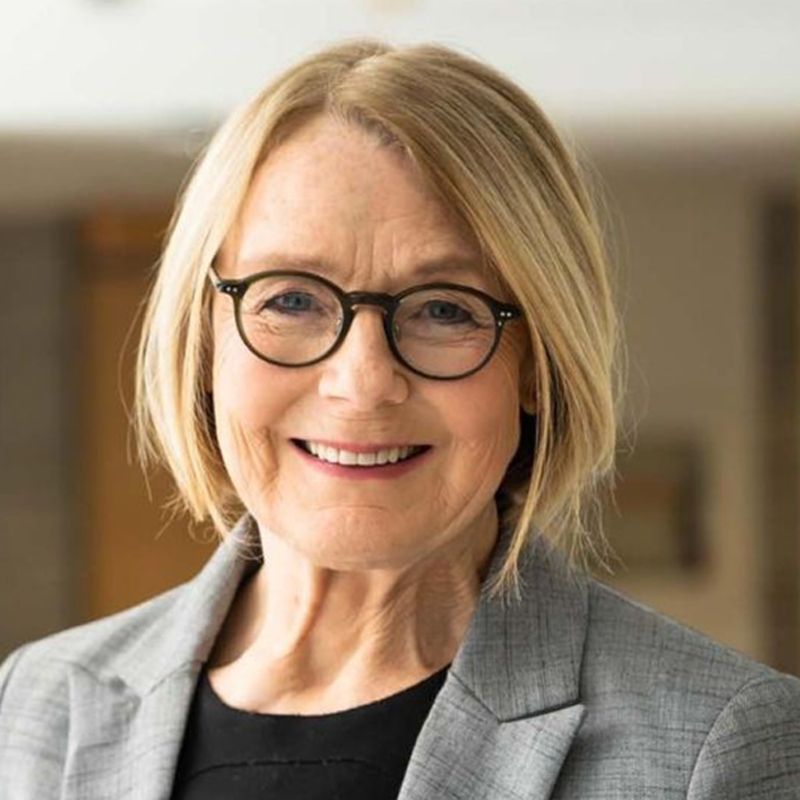
- Peggy Nash, 2025

Member of Parliament for Parkdale—High Park
- In office 2 May 2011 – 4 August 2015
- Preceded by: Gerard Kennedy
- Succeeded by: Arif Virani
- In office 23 January 2006 – 13 October 2008
- Preceded by: Sarmite Bulte
- Succeeded by: Gerard Kennedy

President of the New Democratic Party
- In office 15 August 2009 – 18 June 2011
- Preceded by: Anne McGrath
- Succeeded by: Brian Topp

Personal details
- Born: 28 June 1951 (age 75) Toronto, Ontario, Canada
- Party: New Democratic
- Spouse: Carl Kaufman
- Children: 3
- Profession: Labour negotiator

Peggy A. Nash CM (born 28 June 1951) is a Canadian labour official and politician from Toronto, Ontario, Canada. She was the New Democratic Party (NDP) Member of Parliament (MP) for the Parkdale—High Park electoral district (riding) in Toronto, and was the Official Opposition's Industry Critic. Before becoming a parliamentarian, she worked as a labour official at the Canadian Auto Workers union (CAW). In 2005, she became the first woman to negotiate a major contract with one of the Detroit-based automobile corporations.

She was first elected as the MP for Parkdale—High Park in the 2006 federal election. In the 2008 federal election, she was defeated in her re-election bid by Liberal candidate Gerard Kennedy. Following the 2008 election, Nash returned to her previous job as a labour official with the CAW.

On 15 August 2009, she was elected to a two-year term as the federal New Democratic Party's president at the party's convention in Halifax, Nova Scotia. She was a candidate again in the 2011 federal election and defeated Kennedy, garnering 47 percent of the vote to reclaim her former seat in the House of Commons of Canada.

In 2012, Nash was a candidate for the leadership of the federal NDP. She finished fourth on the second ballot at the party's convention in Toronto on 24 March 2012. In April 2012, she was reappointed as the NDP's Finance Critic by new leader Thomas Mulcair. She lost her seat in the October 2015 election.

After politics, she became an educator associated with Toronto Metropolitan University. In 2022, she was invested into the Order of Canada for her work in the labour movement and getting women into politics. She became the executive director of the progressive Canadian Centre for Policy Alternatives in March 2024.

== Life prior to politics ==
Nash was born in Toronto, and holds an Honours B.A. in French language and literature from the University of Toronto and is fluent in English, French, and Spanish. Nash has lived in the Parkdale—High Park electoral district for over twenty years, where she is married with three sons. In the years before she ran for parliament, Nash worked as a ticket agent and union activist with the Canadian Airline Employees Association. When that union merged with the Canadian Auto Workers in 1985, she became an assistant to national president Bob White. When he stepped down, she continued in that same capacity with his successor Basil "Buzz" Hargrove. She worked as a labour negotiator in the transportation, service and manufacturing sectors and was the first labour woman responsible for major auto negotiations in North America, when she negotiated the 2005 Ford Canada contract. Nash also wrote articles published in Our Times, Canadian Dimension, The Canadian Forum, and Our Schools Our Selves, and co-authored an article in the Canadian Labour Law Journal.

== Member of Parliament ==
=== 39th Parliament • 2006 to 2008 ===
Nash's initial campaign for electoral office was unsuccessful. She vied for the federal parliamentary seat in the Parkdale–High Park electoral district during the 38th Canadian general election. She lost a close contest to the incumbent Liberal Member of Parliament (MP) Sarmite Bulte on 28 June 2004. Nash ran again in the 39th Canadian general election, in a rematch of the 2004 campaign. Bulte came under heavy criticism as she received campaign donations from entertainment companies, which was considered a conflict of interest given she supported stricter copyright laws. Nash narrowly won the election with a 4.6 percent margin, or 2,301 votes, on 23 January 2006.

During her first term as an MP, Nash served in the 39th Canadian Parliament. She assumed the role of the NDP's Industry Critic and Member of the Parliamentary Standing Committee on Industry, Science, and Technology. Notably, she introduced a legislative proposal aimed at reinstating a national minimum wage of $10 per hour. Other House of Commons issues she advocated for included ones that dealt with water sustainability, public transit, and the Arts. She brought forward legislation including the "Once in a Lifetime" bill, to reunite new Canadians with their families. She championed several consumer issues such as reducing credit card interest rates, ATM fees, and payday lender interest rates.

As a member of the Standing Committee on Industry, Science and Technology, Nash was instrumental in stopping the acquisition of MacDonald Dettwiler by U.S.-owned Alliant Techsystems. MacDonald Dettwiler is the Canadian space company which produced the Canadarm and RADARSAT-2 satellite, and impacts the issue of Canadian Arctic sovereignty. Nash argued that the sale would have devastated the Canadian aerospace industry and eliminated Canadian control over a technology developed with the aid of millions of Canadian taxpayers' dollars.

Nash has also been active in Parliamentary Friendship Groups for Poland, Ukraine and Tibet. As the Member of Parliament representing the largest population of Tibetan refugees in Canada, she helped push for a resolution declaring the Dalai Lama an honorary Canadian citizen, and also personally introduced a motion calling for negotiations between China and Tibet. Both resolutions received unanimous support in the House of Commons. She was a parliamentary representative on the 2006 Canadian post-war fact-finding mission to Lebanon that was condemned by the Conservative government for its support for the legalization and decriminalization of Hezbollah in Canada.

=== 40th Canadian general election and its aftermath ===
In the 40th Canadian general election, held on 14 October 2008, she was defeated by Gerard Kennedy, the Liberal candidate who formerly represented the electoral district at the provincial level. Nash was subsequently mentioned as a potential candidate for the Ontario New Democratic Party 2009 leadership election, although she did not run.

After leaving Parliament, she returned to her position as one of the five assistants to CAW president Ken Lewenza. Her new duties within the CAW shifted from transportation to dealing with CAW bargaining units in post-secondary education and airlines. Her responsibilities also included representing the union at the Canadian Labour Congress (CLC). At the federal party's national convention in Halifax, Nova Scotia, she was elected party president on 15 August 2009.

=== 41st Parliament • 2011 to 2015 ===
On 15 January 2010, it was announced on the Parkdale—High Park NDP website that Nash would be running for the nomination to be the electoral district association's candidate in the 41st Canadian general election. She was acclaimed as the NDP candidate in Parkdale—High Park on 28 January 2010, and campaigned until the 2 May 2011 election. In a rematch of the 2008 campaign, Nash defeated Kennedy by 7,313 votes, or 14 percent, to regain her seat in parliament. Jack Layton, in his role as Leader of Her Majesty's Loyal Opposition during the 41st Canadian Parliament, appointed Nash as the Finance Critic in his Shadow Cabinet on May 26, 2011. When she became an MP again, she did not re-offer to run for president, and Brian Topp was acclaimed as her replacement at the federal NDP's Vancouver bi-annual convention on June 18, 2011.

=== Leadership candidacy ===
With Jack Layton's death on 22 August 2011, the NDP began seeking a new federal leader. On 9 September, the NDP's executive decided the rules for the leadership election, the date and place for the convention. Nash expressed interest in running, but appeared hesitant at first to run because she would have to resign as the Finance Critic. By the last week of October, she sent signals that she intended to run, and announced her candidacy on 28 October at a press conference in Toronto. Nash was endorsed by former federal NDP leader Alexa McDonough, who stated "[Nash] has the skills and experience to take on what she described as the Conservative government's failing economic policies". On 24 March 2012, at the Metro Toronto Convention Centre, she placed fourth on the second ballot and was automatically dropped from contention. She did not back any of the remaining candidates, and freed her delegates — that had not already voted in advance — to vote for whomever they wanted. A few weeks later, new NDP leader Thomas Mulcair reappointed her to the Official Opposition's Shadow Cabinet as the Finance Critic on 19 April.

=== 42nd Canadian general election ===
Nash ran for another term in the 2015 federal election, but lost her seat to Arif Virani when the Liberal Party swept all 25 ridings in Toronto, including Parkdale—High Park.

== Life after office ==
Nash is a decorated political and social commentator featured in The Globe and Mail, The Toronto Star, The Hill Times, The Conversation, Policy Options, Rabble, The Lawyers Daily, and the Huffington Post. Her work covers labour rights/disputes, women's rights/advocacy and political commentary on municipal, provincial and federal elections.

In 2017 Nash started her position as a Senior Advisor to the Dean of the Faculty of Arts at Toronto Metropolitan University. As a part of this role Nash is a co-founder and a co-instructor of the Women in the House program. Nash also acts as a lead at the Institute for Future Legislators at Toronto Metropolitan University. The Institute changed its name, in early June 2023, to Innovations in Democratic Leadership.

During the spring of 2020, Nash was awarded an Honorary Doctorate of Law from Brock University. This recognition was bestowed upon her for her unwavering dedication as a long-time advocate for labour rights, human rights, gender equality, and democratic engagement. Her acceptance of the degree was deferred until the spring of 2022.

In May 2022, Nash published her book titled Women Winning Office: An Activist's Guide to Getting Elected, which serves as a practical resource for activist women seeking to participate in the political process and advance their representation.

On 13 March 2025 it was announced that she became the executive director of the Canadian Centre for Policy Alternatives (CCPA), a non-profit group involved in progressive issues related to social, economic and environmental justice.

== Awards ==
Nash has been involved with many organizations advancing women's equality. She was a founding member of Equal Voice, an all-party organization which advocates for the election of more women in Canada, and was a recipient of a Certificate of Honour from the City of Toronto for her contribution to women's equality.

In 2006, Now named Nash the Best MP in Toronto. Before she served in the House of Commons, she was active in foreign-affairs matters including being a Canadian election monitor in the first post-apartheid elections in South Africa in 1994; and, an election monitor in both the 2004 and 2007 Ukrainian elections. She was the recipient of two environmental awards from the Sierra Club of Canada and she helped create the NDP Green Car Strategy with Greenpeace and the Canadian Auto Workers.

In February 2009, in recognition of her work as a trailblazer who opened doors for women in the labour movement and made childcare issues a public priority, Nash became the recipient of the 2009 YWCA Toronto Woman of Distinction award in the Labour category. The YWCA also recognized her contributions to advancing the women's causes in politics, through her involvement with the founding of Equal Voice and becoming an elected member of the House of Commons. She was presented with the award at the 29th Annual YWCA Women of Distinction Awards Dinner, at the Metro Toronto Convention Centre on May 13, 2009.

In December 2022, Nash was invested into the Order of Canada in recognition of her advocacy for rights and equality in Canadian politics and the labour movement and for being the first woman in North America to lead union negotiations with a major auto company, breaking barriers in male-dominated sectors.

In 2023, Nash was shortlisted for The Next Generation Indie Book Awards, Adult Non-fiction, Women's Issues and The Next Generation Indie Book Awards, Adult Non-fiction, Social Change.
