= Andrew Witer =

Canadian politician

Member of Parliament for Parkdale—High Park
- In office 1984–1988
- Preceded by: Jesse Flis
- Succeeded by: Jesse Flis

Personal details
- Born: November 23, 1946 (age 79) Leonberg, Germany
- Party: Progressive Conservative Party
- Profession: Management consultant

Andrew Witer (born November 23, 1946) is a Canadian politician. He served in the House of Commons of Canada from 1984 to 1988, as a member of the Progressive Conservative Party.

== Background ==
Witer was born to a Ukrainian family in Leonberg, Germany. He came to Canada in his youth. He was educated at Sir Wilfrid Laurier University and worked as a management consultant.

== Politics ==
He first campaigned for the House of Commons in the 1980 federal election, and lost to Liberal incumbent Jesse Flis by 5,097 votes in Parkdale—High Park. He ran again in the 1984 election, and defeated Flis by 1,460 votes amid a landslide majority government victory for the Conservatives under Brian Mulroney.

Witer was on the right wing of the Progressive Conservative Party, and was part of a group in the party caucus informally known as the "brat pack" (Toronto Star, 17 January 1987). In 1987, Witer and Alex Kindy used a procedural mechanism to prevent the quick passage of a bill to establish a permanent war criminal investigative agency in Canada. Many supported such an agency as a means of prosecuting Nazi war criminals in Canada. Witer was quoted as saying, "Canada doesn't need a witch-hunting brigade like the Americans have, because it would only cause anger and panic in East European communities" (Houston Chronicle, 8 February 1987).

He was defeated in the 1988 election, falling to Flis by 3,196 votes.

== Later life ==
Witer was appointed to the board of the Metro Toronto Housing Authority in 1989 (Globe and Mail, 28 April 1989).

Witer was named "Person of the Year" by the Canadian Ukrainian Congress in 1988, and chaired the World Congress of Ukrainians Human Rights Commission from 1989 to 1991. He joined the Romyr and Associates Public Relations Firm in 1993, and became its president in 2001 (Eastern Economist Daily, 26 July 2001). In this capacity, he has done extensive work in Ukraine.

Witer campaigned for the Metropolitan Toronto Council in 1994, and lost to future mayor David Miller in the city's 19th ward.
