= Marijuana Party candidates in the 2011 Canadian federal election =

This is a list of the candidates that ran for the Marijuana Party in the 41st Canadian federal election. The party fielded only five candidates, each of whom was located in Ontario.

In the 2011 election, the Marijuana Party of Canada received a total of 1,863 votes and roughly 0.01% of the popular vote. None of the candidates were elected.

== Ontario ==
Riding	Candidate's name	Gender	Occupation	Votes	%	Rank
Ottawa Centre	John Akpata	Male		326	0.50	5/8
Parkdale—High Park	Terry Parker			213	0.42	6/7
Hamilton Centre	Michael Baldasaro	Male		888	2.12	4/5
Guelph	Kornelis Klevering	Male		171	0.29	6/8
Thunder Bay—Superior North	Denis A. Carrière	Male		265	0.72	5/5
