= Jesse Flis =

Canadian politician (1933–2026)

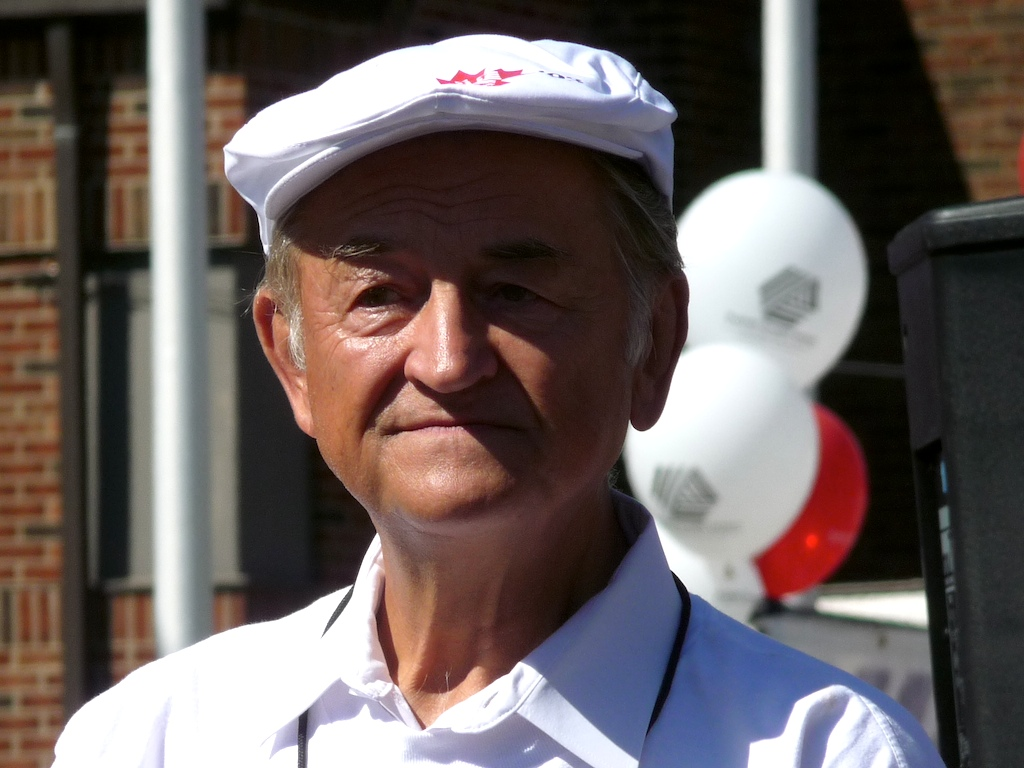
- Flis in 2009

Member of Parliament for Parkdale—High Park
- In office November 21, 1988 – June 2, 1997
- Preceded by: Andrew Witer
- Succeeded by: Sarmite Bulte
- In office May 22, 1979 – September 4, 1984
- Preceded by: Yuri Shymko
- Succeeded by: Andrew Witer

Personal details
- Born: Jesse Philip Flis; November 15, 1933 Fosston, Saskatchewan, Canada
- Died: January 13, 2026 (aged 92) Toronto, Ontario, Canada
- Party: Liberal Party of Canada
- Profession: Educator

Jesse Philip Flis (November 15, 1933 – January 13, 2026) was a Canadian politician. He served in the House of Commons of Canada from 1979 to 1984, and from 1988 to 1997, as a member of the Liberal Party of Canada for the Parkdale—High Park electoral district in Toronto's west end.

== Life and career ==
Flis was born in Fosston, Saskatchewan on November 15, 1933. He took his Bachelor of Arts degree at the University of Toronto, and received a Master of Education from the Ontario Institute for Studies in Education. He worked as an educator and school principal, and was a member of the Toronto Board of Education from 1956 to 1979. Flis was also a founding director of Operation Go Home (Toronto Branch), and is the recipient of a Gold Award from the Canadian Polish Congress.

He was first elected to the House of Commons in the 1979 election, defeating Progressive Conservative candidate Yuri Shymko by seventy-four votes in the Toronto riding of Parkdale—High Park. The Progressive Conservatives under Joe Clark won a minority government in this election, and Flis served as a member of the Official Opposition in the parliament which followed.

The Clark government was subsequently defeated on a motion of non-confidence, and another federal election was called for 1980. Flis was re-elected over Progressive Conservative candidate Andrew Witer by 5,097 votes, as the Liberals won a majority government under Pierre-Elliott Trudeau. He served as parliamentary secretary to the Minister of Transport from 1982 to 1984. Flis supported John Turner's successful bid for the party leadership in 1984.

The Progressive Conservatives won a majority government under Brian Mulroney in the 1984 election, and Flis lost his seat to Witer by 1,460 votes. He served as Coordinator of Special Education for Toronto's Secondary Schools between 1984 and 1988, and defeated Witer by 3,196 votes in the 1988 election to return as a parliamentarian. He supported Paul Martin's bid for the Liberal Party leadership in 1990.

On October 3, 1990, he rose on a question of privilege concerning the meaning of the oath of allegiance to the Queen, and the sincerity of a Member of Parliament’s solemn affirmation, because the week before, on September 23, new Bloc Québécois (BQ) Member Gilles Duceppe (Laurier–Sainte-Marie) had sworn his loyalty to the people of Quebec and vowed to fight for Quebec sovereignty. In reaction, Flis claimed that “when someone else sitting in this Chamber now takes that same oath [of allegiance to the Queen] and then goes and washes his or her hands of this oath, this oath has very little meaning to every member sitting in the House.” So, he asked the Speaker to rule on the matter “because it undermines the role of every member in the House.” Then Speaker John Fraser ruled that he was “not empowered to make a judgment on the circumstances or the sincerity with which a duly elected Member takes the oath of allegiance. The significance of the oath to each Member is a matter of conscience and so it must remain.”

The Liberals returned to power in the 1993 election after nine years in opposition, and Flis was re-elected by a landslide in Parkdale—High Park. After his victory, he commented "I'd like nothing better than to be in cabinet where you can not only make decisions, but implement them" . He was not appointed to cabinet, however, and instead served as parliamentary secretary to the Secretary of State for External Affairs from 1993 to 1995, and to the Minister of Foreign Affairs from 1995 to 1996. He did not seek re-election in 1997.

Flis endorsed Dalton McGuinty's bid to lead the Liberal Party of Ontario in 1996.

Flis died on January 13, 2026, at the age of 92.

Chapters dedicated to Jesse Flis were included in:

- Aleksandra Ziolkowska-Boehm: "Dreams and Reality", Toronto 1984, ISBN 0-9691756-0-4;
- Aleksandra Ziolkowska-Boehm: Kanada, Kanada..., Warszawa 1986, ISBN 83-7021-006-6;
- Aleksandra Ziolkowska-Boehm: "Korzenie są polskie", Warszawa 1992, ISBN 83-7066-406-7;
- Aleksandra Ziolkowska-Boehm: "The Roots Are Polish", Toronto, ISBN 0-920517-05-6.

== Sources ==
- Jesse Flis
