= Parkdale—High Park (federal electoral district) =

Canadian federal electoral district

Ontario electoral district
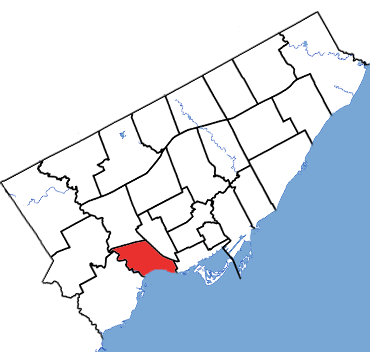
- Parkdale—High Park in relation to the other Toronto ridings (2015 boundaries)
- Coordinates: 43.65°N 79.47°W

Federal electoral district
- Legislature: House of Commons
- District created: 1976
- District abolished: 2025
- First contested: 1979
- Last contested: 2021
- District webpage: profile, map

Demographics
- Population (2021): 106,750
- Electors (2015): 76,952
- Area (km²): 16
- Census division: Toronto
- Census subdivision: Toronto

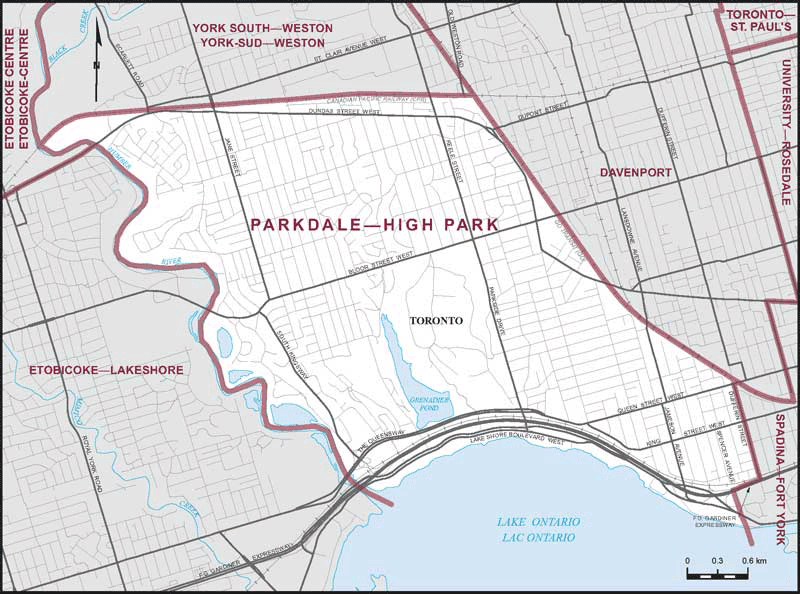
Map of Parkdale-High Park

Parkdale—High Park was a federal electoral district in Ontario, Canada from 1976 to 2025. It was represented in the House of Commons of Canada starting with the 1979 Canadian general election. The district was created during the 1976 electoral boundaries redistribution from parts of Parkdale, High Park—Humber Valley, Davenport and Spadina districts. The first Member of Parliament (MP) was Liberal Party member, Jesse Flis, and the final one was Arif Virani, also a Liberal member.

According to the 2016 census, Parkdale—High Park has the lowest percentage of visible minorities (26.2%) among all City of Toronto ridings; it also has the highest percentage of people of Irish (20.0%), German (9.8%), and French (8.9%) ethnic origin of all City of Toronto ridings.

After the 2022 Canadian federal electoral redistribution process, the 2023 representation orders renamed the electoral district Taiaiako'n—Parkdale—High Park. Redistribution expanded the district, made up mostly of the old Parkdale—High Park, the southern portion of York South—Weston and a small portion of Spadina—Fort York in the southeast. The new electoral district came into effect upon the calling of the 2025 Canadian federal election.

== Geography ==
It is located in the central-west part of Toronto on the lakefront. It has 106,559 residents. It is composed of the seven neighbourhoods surrounding High Park. Including the park and portions west, between the north and south borders of the park is the neighbourhood of Swansea; north of the park are the neighbourhoods of High Park North and the south half of The Junction; north-west of the park are the neighbourhoods of Runnymede-Bloor West Village and Lambton Baby Point; to the east of the park is Roncesvalles; and Parkdale directly to the south and to the south-east.

It consists of the part of the City of Toronto bounded on the south by Lake Ontario, on the west by the Humber River, and on the north and east by a line drawn from the Humber River east along the Canadian Pacific Railway, southeast along the Canadian National/Canadian Pacific Railway, west along Queen Street West, south along Dufferin Street, west along Dufferin Street, and south along the southerly production of Spencer Avenue.

== History ==
Prior to the 2023 representation orders from the 2022 Canadian federal electoral redistribution process, the electoral district was named Parkdale—High Park. The electoral district was created in 1976 from parts of Parkdale, High Park—Humber Valley, Davenport and Spadina electoral districts.

In 1976, it was defined to consist of the part of the City of Toronto bounded on the south by the shore of Lake Ontario, on the north and west by the city limits, on the east by a line drawn from north to south along Runnymede Road, east along Annette Street, south along Keele Street, east along Humberside Avenue, southeast along the Canadian National Railway, south along Bathurst Street; thence southerly along Bathurst Street to the Western Channel of Toronto Harbour.

In 1987, it was defined to consist of the parts of the cities of Toronto and York bounded on the west by the city limits of Toronto and York, and on the north, east and south by a line drawn east along the Canadian Pacific Railway line, south along Runnymede Road, east along Annette Street, southeast along Dundas Street West, east along Dupont Street, southwest along the Canadian National Railway line immediately east of Dundas Street West, south along Atlantic Avenue, west along the Gardiner Expressway, south along the southerly production of Spencer Avenue.

In 1996, it was defined to consist of the parts of the cities of Toronto and York bounded on the west by the city limits of Toronto and York, and on the north, east and south by a line drawn east along the Canadian Pacific Railway, southeast along the Canadian National Railway, south along Atlantic Avenue, west along the Gardiner Expressway, and south along the southerly production of Spencer Avenue.

In 2003, it was given its current boundaries as described above. This riding was unchanged after the 2012 electoral redistribution. However, the 2023 representation orders did change the name by adding "Taiaiako'n" to the beginning of the name, and the boundaries had significant changes in the north, including much of traditional area of the old City of West Toronto that was part of the old High Park electoral district pre-1976.

=== Former boundaries ===
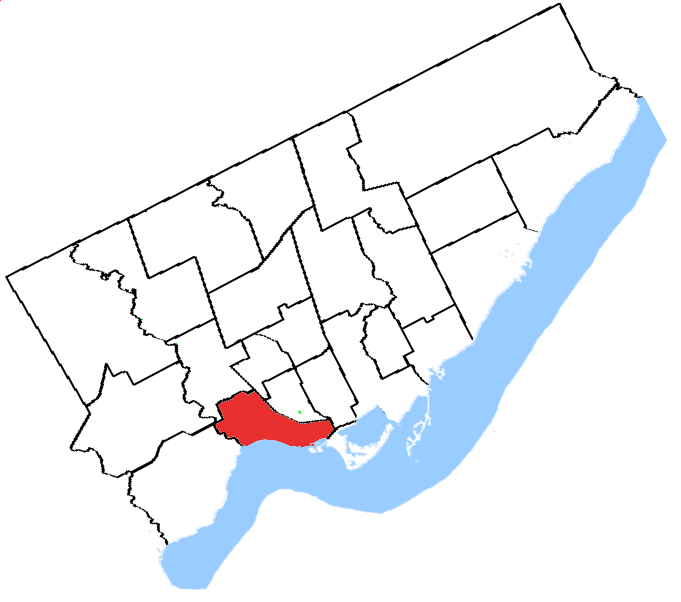
1976 to 1987

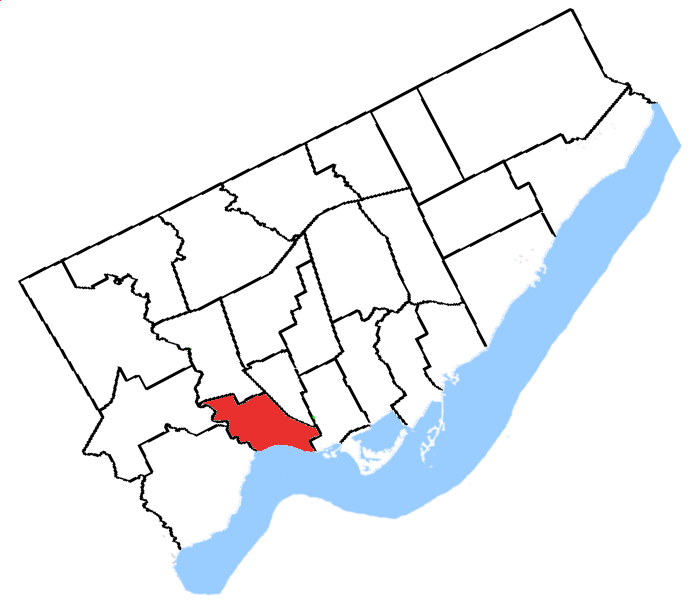
1987 to 1996

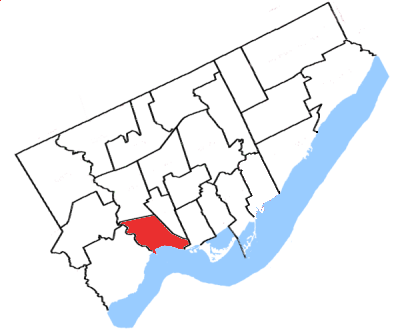
1996 to 2003

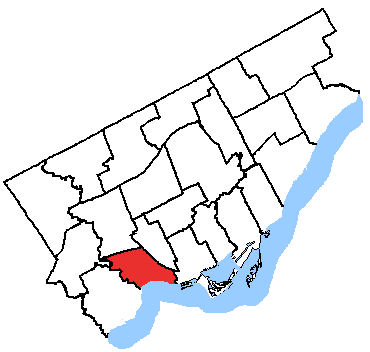
2003 to 2015

== Demographics ==
According to the 2021 Canadian census

Ethnic groups: 69.1% White, 6.0% Black, 5.1% South Asian, 3.9% Chinese, 2.7% Filipino, 2.7% Latin American, 1.9% Southeast Asian, 1.8% Indigenous

Languages: 65.8% English, 2.7% Polish, 2.4% Spanish, 1.8% French, 1.8% Portuguese, 1.6% Tibetan, 1.5% Russian, 1.4% Ukrainian, 1.1% Tagalog, 1.0% Vietnamese, 1.0% Serbian, 1.0% Cantonese

Religions: 43.1% Christian (24.1% Catholic, 4.0% Christian Orthodox, 2.8% Anglican, 2.6% United Church, 6.7% Other), 3.5% Buddhist, 2.9% Muslim, 2.0% Jewish, 1.9% Hindu, 45.3% None

Median income: $46,800 (2020)

Average income: $72,800 (2020)

== Members of Parliament ==
This riding has elected the following members of Parliament:

Parliament	Years	Member	Party
Parkdale—High Park; Riding created from Parkdale, High Park—Humber Valley, Davenport and Spadina
31st	1979–1980	Jesse Flis	Liberal
32nd	1980–1984	Jesse Flis	Liberal
33rd	1984–1988	Andrew Witer	Progressive Conservative
34th	1988–1993	Jesse Flis	Liberal
35th	1993–1997	Jesse Flis	Liberal
36th	1997–2000	Sarmite Bulte	Liberal
37th	2000–2004	Sarmite Bulte	Liberal
38th	2004–2006	Sarmite Bulte	Liberal
39th	2006–2008	Peggy Nash	New Democratic
40th	2008–2011	Gerard Kennedy	Liberal
41st	2011–2015	Peggy Nash	New Democratic
42nd	2015–2019	Arif Virani	Liberal
43rd	2019–2021	Arif Virani	Liberal
44th	2021–2025	Arif Virani	Liberal

== Election results ==
2021 federal election redistributed results
Party	Vote	%
Liberal	24,400	42.79
New Democratic	21,893	38.40
Conservative	7,603	13.33
People's	1,825	3.20
Green	1,077	1.89
Others	220	0.39

2021 Canadian federal election
Party	Candidate	Votes	%	±%	Expenditures
Liberal	Arif Virani	22,307	42.45	-4.94	$104,400.40
New Democratic	Paul M. Taylor	20,602	39.21	+7.71	$106,004.63
Conservative	Nestor Sanajko	6,815	12.97	-0.19	$9,183.25
People's	Wilfried Richard Alexander Danzinger	1,642	3.13	+2.07	$724.84
Green	Diem Marchand-Lafortune	957	1.82	-4.61	$3,873.90
Marijuana	Terry Parker	130	0.25	+0.05	$0.00
Marxist–Leninist	Lorne Gershuny	90	0.17	+0.10	$0.00
Total valid votes/expense limit		52,543	–	–	$110,699.74
Total rejected ballots					
Turnout		52,543	65.46		
Eligible voters		80,265			
Liberal hold		Swing		-6.33	
Source: Elections Canada

2019 Canadian federal election
Party	Candidate	Votes	%	±%	Expenditures
Liberal	Arif Virani	28,852	47.4	+5.36	$104,265.06
New Democratic	Paul M. Taylor	19,180	31.5	-8.74	$100,698.11
Conservative	Adam Pham	8,015	13.2	+0.15	$44,890.73
Green	Nick Capra	3,916	6.4	+3.42	$14,108.37
People's	Greg Wycliffe	643	1.1	-	none listed
Communist	Alykhan Pabani	119	0.2	-	$626.57
Marijuana	Terry Parker	119	0.2	-0.13	none listed
Marxist–Leninist	Lorne Gershuny	43	0.07	-0.1	none listed
Total valid votes/expense limit		60,887	100.0		
Total rejected ballots		382			
Turnout		61,269	74.0		
Eligible voters		82,797			
Liberal hold		Swing		+7.05	
Source: Elections Canada

2015 Canadian federal election
Party	Candidate	Votes	%	±%	Expenditures
Liberal	Arif Virani	24,623	42.04	+9.15	$118,148.12
New Democratic	Peggy Nash	23,566	40.24	-6.96	$143,864.29
Conservative	Ian Allen	7,641	13.05	-2.50	$16,096.82
Green	Adam Phipps	1,743	2.98	-0.29	$4,405.49
Libertarian	Mark Jeftovic	610	1.04	–	–
Marijuana	Terry Parker	191	0.33	-0.09	–
Marxist–Leninist	Lorne Gershuny	100	0.17	±0	–
Independent	Carol Royer	93	0.16	–	$4,449.41
Total valid votes/Expense limit		58,567	100.0		$211,869.52
Total rejected ballots		269	–	–	
Turnout		58,836	–	–	
Eligible voters		76,952			
Source: Elections Canada

2011 Canadian federal election
Party	Candidate	Votes	%	±%	Expenditures
New Democratic	Peggy Nash	24,046	47.20	+11.23	
Liberal	Gerard Kennedy	16,757	32.89	-10.08	
Conservative	Taylor Train	7,924	15.55	+3.12	
Green	Sarah Newton	1,666	3.27	-4.20	
Christian Heritage	Andrew Borkowski	251	0.49	+0.02	
Marijuana	Terry Parker	215	0.42	-0.01	
Marxist–Leninist	Lorne Gershuny	86	0.17	-0.05	
Total valid votes/Expense limit		50,945	100.00		
Total rejected ballots		216	0.42	0.00	
Turnout		51,161	71.10	6.50	
Eligible voters		71,954	–	–	

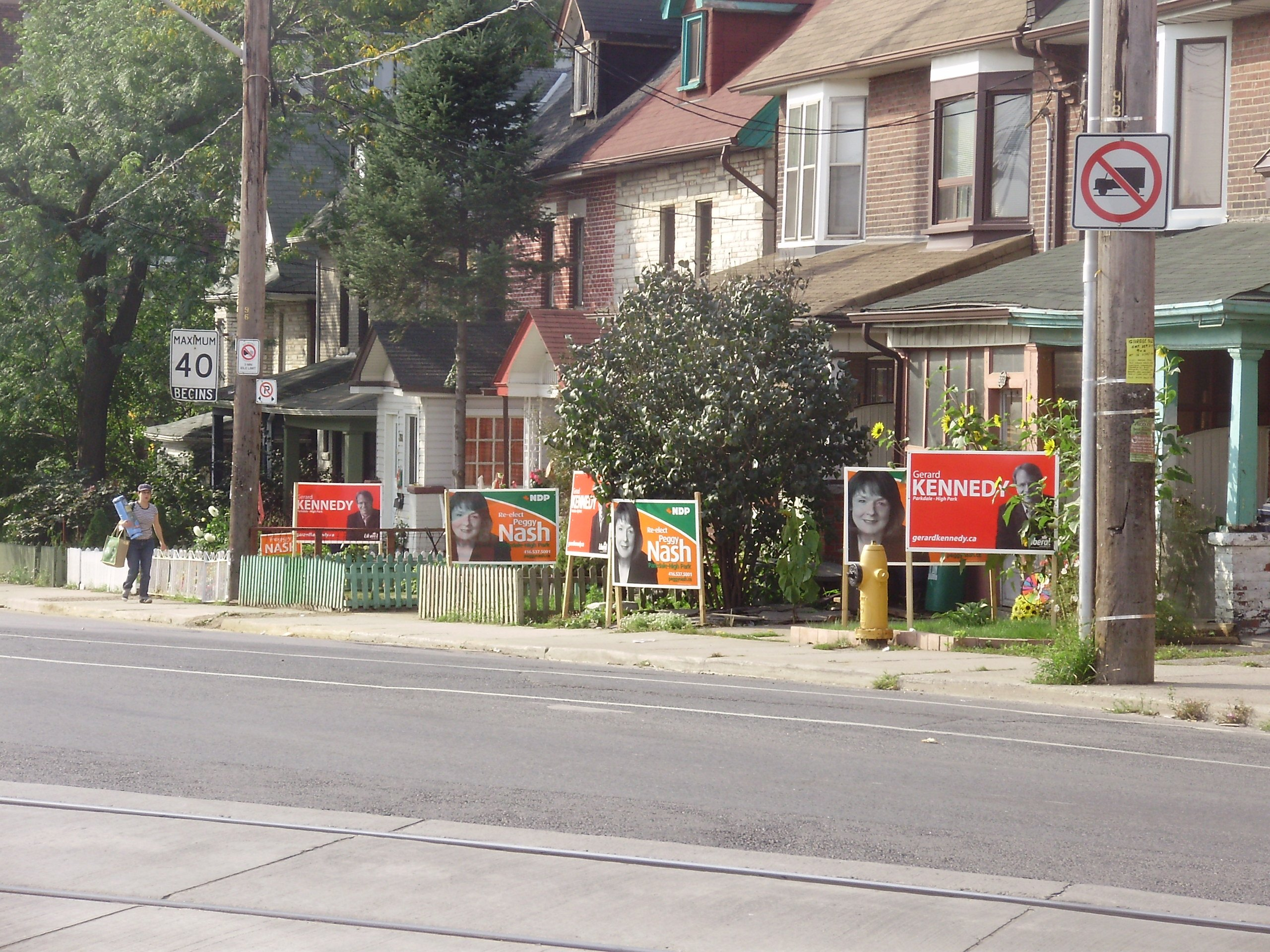
Former Liberal leadership hopeful Gerard Kennedy challenged incumbent MP Peggy Nash in the 2008 federal election.

2008 Canadian federal election
Party	Candidate	Votes	%	±%	Expenditures
Liberal	Gerard Kennedy	20,705	42.97	+7.04	$66,616
New Democratic	Peggy Nash	17,332	35.97	-4.43	$76,005
Conservative	Jilian Saweczko	5,992	12.43	-4.62	$27,886
Green	Robert L. Rishchynski	3,601	7.47	+1.96	$27,025
Christian Heritage	Andrew Borkowski	230	0.47	–	$402
Marijuana	Terry Parker	209	0.43	-0.17	
Marxist–Leninist	Lorne Gershuny	110	0.22	-0.02	
Total valid votes/Expense limit		48,179	100.00	$82,121	
Total rejected ballots		205	0.42	-0.04	
Turnout		48,384	64.60	-5.73	

2006 Canadian federal election
Party	Candidate	Votes	%	±%
New Democratic	Peggy Nash	20,790	40.40	+5.9
Liberal	Sarmite Bulte	18,489	35.93	-6.1
Conservative	Jurij Klufas	8,777	17.05	+1.7
Green	Robert L. Rishchynski	2,840	5.51	-1.4
Marijuana	Terry Parker	311	0.60	-0.2
Marxist–Leninist	Lorne Gershuny	124	0.24	0.0
Independent	Beverly Bernardo	119	0.23	
Total valid votes		51,450	100.00	
Total rejected ballots		240	0.46	-0.07
Turnout		51,690	70.33	+6.19

2004 Canadian federal election
Party	Candidate	Votes	%	±%
Liberal	Sarmite Bulte	19,727	42.05	-7.3
New Democratic	Peggy Nash	16,201	34.53	+15.5
Conservative	Jurij Klufas (Note: Conservative vote is compared to the total of the Canadian Alliance vote and Progressive Conservative vote in 2000 election.)	7,221	15.39	-9.8
Green	Neil Spiegel	3,249	6.92	+4.1
Marijuana	Terry Parker	384	0.81	-1.1
Marxist–Leninist	Lorne Gershuny	130	0.27	0.0
Total valid votes		46,912	100.00	
Total rejected ballots		250	0.53	
Turnout		47,162	64.14	

2000 Canadian federal election
Party	Candidate	Votes	%	±%
Liberal	Sarmite Bulte	20,676	49.4	+1.1
New Democratic	Paul Schmidt	7,947	19.0	-1.5
Progressive Conservative	David Strycharz	5,681	13.6	-0.3
Alliance	Vicki Vancas (Note: Canadian Alliance vote is compared to the Reform vote in 1997 election.)	4,882	11.7	-2.1
Green	Neil Spiegel	1,161	2.8	+1.2
Marijuana	Terry Parker	775	1.9	
Canadian Action	Greg Robertson	317	0.8	0.0
Communist	Wilfred Szczesny	155	0.4	
Independent	Michel Dugré	132	0.3	
Marxist–Leninist	Lorne Gershuny	122	0.3	-0.4
Total valid votes		41,848	100.0	

1997 Canadian federal election
Party	Candidate	Votes	%	±%
Liberal	Sarmite Bulte	20,692	48.3	-6.1
New Democratic	Paul Schmidt	8,762	20.4	+11.1
Progressive Conservative	Jilian Saweczko	5,926	13.8	+0.2
Reform	Michael Jakubcak	5,881	13.7	-2.4
Green	Laura Weinberg	696	1.6	+0.5
Canadian Action	Miriam Hawkins	324	0.8	
Marxist–Leninist	Pierre Chénier	311	0.7	+0.6
Natural Law	Gregory Wayne Roberts	267	0.6	-0.3
Total valid votes		42,859	100.0	

1993 Canadian federal election
Party	Candidate	Votes	%	±%
Liberal	Jesse Flis	22,068	54.4	+10.5
Reform	Lee Primeau	6,520	16.1	
Progressive Conservative	Don Baker	5,519	13.6	-23.2
New Democratic	David Miller	3,775	9.3	-8.6
National	Stephen A. Biega	1,308	3.2	
Green	Richard Roy	461	1.1	
Natural Law	Wanda Beaver	369	0.9	
Libertarian	Haig Baronikian	314	0.8	+0.2
Independent	Miguel Figueroa	105	0.3	0.0
Abolitionist	Thomas Earl Pennington	60	0.1	
Marxist–Leninist	André Vachon	53	0.1	
Total valid votes		40,552	100.0	

1988 Canadian federal election
Party	Candidate	Votes	%	±%
Liberal	Jesse Flis	19,614	43.9	+7.4
Progressive Conservative	Andrew Witer	16,418	36.8	-3.5
New Democratic	Anna Pollonetsky	8,002	17.9	-2.9
Libertarian	Penny Hoar	267	0.6	
Independent	Matthew Hall	227	0.5	-0.1
Communist	Anna Larsen	130	0.3	
Total valid votes		44,658	100.0	

1984 Canadian federal election
Party	Candidate	Votes	%	±%
Progressive Conservative	Andrew Witer	15,879	40.2	+8.2
Liberal	Jesse Flis	14,419	36.5	-9.0
New Democratic	John Friesen	8,232	20.9	-0.6
Green	Dieter Heinrich	592	1.5	
Libertarian	Wilf Olin	223	0.6	+0.2
Communist	Anna Larsen	130	0.3	
Total valid votes		39,475	100.0	

1980 Canadian federal election
Party	Candidate	Votes	%	±%
Liberal	Jesse Flis	17,213	45.6	+7.9
Progressive Conservative	Andrew Witer	12,116	32.1	-5.4
New Democratic	Doug Little	8,094	21.4	-2.1
Communist	Wilfred Szczesny	160	0.4	0.0
Libertarian	Shirley Yamada	146	0.4	-0.2
Marxist–Leninist	Christine Nugent	55	0.1	0.0
Total valid votes		37,784	100.0	

1979 Canadian federal election
Party	Candidate	Votes	%
Liberal	Jesse Flis	15,281	37.7
Progressive Conservative	Yuri Shymko	15,207	37.5
New Democratic	Doug Little	9,539	23.5
Libertarian	Vincent H. Miller	250	0.6
Communist	Kerry McQuaig	168	0.4
Independent	Armand Siksna	61	0.2
Marxist–Leninist	Christine Nugent	52	0.1
Total valid votes		40,558	100.0

== See also ==
- List of Canadian electoral districts
- Historical federal electoral districts of Canada
