= CharityVillage =

- Website type: Services
- Available in: English
- Editor: Maggie Leithead
- Launched: 1995

CharityVillage (established in 1995) is a resource website for people involved in Canada's nonprofit sector. Online since 1995, the site was one of the earliest web-based resources for nonprofit staffers and volunteers. As of 2010, it had more than 3,000 pages of nonprofit news, resources, how-to articles, training, and funding sources. It also offers hundreds of job, volunteer and event listings, all related to Canada's nonprofit sector.

== History and activities ==
CharityVillage was founded by Doug Jamieson and Jim Hilborn.

The site launched on July 13, 1995, with about 100 pages of content. One of the earliest websites to focus on servicing the nonprofit sector, CharityVillage quickly became a resource hub for people involved in the sector across Canada.

In October 2005, the site launched CharityVillage Campus, the first new paid service offered since its launch. Campus is a series of self-paced, web-based training courses in fundraising and nonprofit management. By that time, the website became a valuable source of career ads for the Canadian non-profit sector.

From the beginning, the site has focused on providing free resources to help nonprofit staffers and volunteers build their skills and connect with one another. Resources include original research articles and interviews, brief news items, links to nonprofits, funding sources, and other nonprofit-related resources and websites. Site users can post job, volunteer and event listings.

The site is self-sustaining through recruitment and supplier advertising revenue.

In March 2011, the website published its first Canadian Nonprofit Sector Salary Report, which went on to become an annual report.

In 2012 the website was relaunched on a new technological platform. In August 2015, Charity Village owners acquired TalentEgg.ca, a career website.

== Publications ==
The site offers three free e-letter publications:

- Village Vibes A weekly roundup of new additions to the site including short nonprofit news items and longer feature articles, links to online resources and new additions to the Nonprofit Neighbourhood directory of nonprofit organizations.
- eLearning Update, A monthly publication focused on skill-building and resources for nonprofit staff and volunteers. Articles focus on fundraising, nonprofit management, and board of directors topics.
- Flow, A monthly publication focused on career issues in the nonprofit sector.
