= Marijuana Party (Canada) =

Federal political party

Marijuana Party Parti Marijuana
- Leader: Blair Longley
- Founded: 2000
- Headquarters: Montreal, Quebec
- Membership (2025): 101
- Ideology: Cannabis rights Cannabis law reforms
- Political position: Single issue
- Senate: 0 / 105
- House of Commons: 0 / 343

Website
- www.marijuanaparty.ca

The Marijuana Party (French: Parti Marijuana) was a registered Canadian federal political party, whose agenda focused on issues related to cannabis in Canada. Apart from this one issue, the party had no other official policies, meaning party candidates were free to express any views on all other political issues. Passage of the Cannabis Act in June 2018 legalized cannabis on 17 October 2018. However, the party remained critical of some of the laws relating to cannabis since legalization and wanted to see them changed or reformed. It also sought to represent and advocate for the rights of cannabis consumers, growers, and small cannabis based businesses.

Candidates appeared on election ballots under the short form "Radical Marijuana" and their status was similar to that of independent candidates. Although governed by the Canada Elections Act, the Marijuana Party was a "decentralized" party, without by-laws, charter or constitution that govern its operations. Its Electoral District Associations were autonomous units of the party as a whole.

In October 2025, the party lost its registration with Elections Canada.

== History ==
The party was founded by Marc-Boris St-Maurice in February 2000. In the November 2000 federal election, the party nominated candidates in 73 ridings in seven provinces and won 66,419 votes (0.52% of national popular vote). St-Maurice came within 13 votes of a third place finish in the riding of Laurier-Saint Marie, finishing ahead of the New Democratic, Progressive Conservative, Alliance, and Marxist–Leninist candidates.

In January and May 2004, changes were made to Canada's electoral laws which significantly reduced the fundraising abilities of the Marijuana Party; specifically, the elections law was amended so that most of the Marijuana Party's political contribution tax credit scheme was criminalized. The result of those changes was a very significant drop in the party's funding by 95%. As of 2004, parties with more than two per cent of the national vote were eligible to receive $2 per year per individual vote, as well as have the majority of their election expenses refunded. Small parties unable to secure two per cent of the vote do not qualify for any subsidy from votes or for election expenses. In the June 2004 federal election, the party nominated 71 candidates, but won only 33,590 votes (0.25% of the national popular vote).

On February 28, 2005, founder St-Maurice announced his intention to join the Liberal Party in order to work for liberalized marijuana laws from within the governing party. Many former Marijuana Party members have joined one of the mainstream political parties (NDP, Liberal, Conservative, or Green) in order to push for reform from within. In 2005, Elections Canada recognized Blair T. Longley as the new party leader following St-Maurice's resignation.

In the January 2006 federal election, the party ran candidates in 23 ridings and received 9,275 votes (0.06% of the national popular vote). In the Nunavut riding, however, the party's candidate won 7.88% of all ballots cast and finished in fourth place, ahead of the Greens.

=== Criticisms of Canada's legalization (2018–2025) ===
In June 2018, the party's leader, Blair Longley, addressed concerns about Canada's cannabis legalization plans, referring to it as 'prohibition 2.0’. Referring to Canada's legalization plans he said "There's this slight bit of progress, but when you look at the bigger picture, it's nothing close to what we would want." He said that "Legalisation is great if you're rich and old and have your own house and can afford to buy expensive marijuana. But if you're still young and poor and don't own your own house, it's worse than it was before." In relation to this Longley brought up some of the varying restrictions across the country, such as landlords in Alberta and Nova Scotia being granted permission to ban cannabis use and cultivation on their properties and Calgary's city council passing a bylaw prohibiting pot consumption in public. Another issue he brought up concerned people's limit to only being able to grow up to four marijuana plants per household, while people can brew as much beer and wine as they want and grow up to 15 kilograms (33 lb) of tobacco.

Other concerns about Canada's marijuana legalization include tough penalties for those who break drug laws, such as prison sentences of up to 14 years for providing marijuana to a minor or selling it without a licence. There are also concerns about restricting sales to government-run monopolies, which favours large producers and makes it very difficult for small businesses in the market. Critics have concerns about the stake of producers and private companies, such as owning patents to names and genetic strains. Longely has been referred to as "skeptical about the quality of the bud commercial producers are putting to market"; he has also said that there is an opportunity for the black market to offer better quality marijuana at lower prices.

Since the announcement of Canada's legalization plans, Longley said the party is being run on a "broken shoestring budget" and is getting "more and more broken and shorter and shorter all the time"; he also questioned whether the party would be able to remain registered. The party needs 250 members' signatures so it can be registered with Elections Canada.

In October 2025, the party lost its registration with Elections Canada.

== Election results ==
Election	# of candidates nominated	# of total votes	% of popular vote	% in ridings run in
2000	73	66,310	0.52%	1.983%
2004	71	33,497	0.25%	1.014%
2006	23	9,275	0.06%	0.812%
2008	8	2,319	0.02%	0.589%
2011	5	1,756	0.01%	0.693%
2015	8	1,626	0.01%	0.343%
2019	4	852	0.00%	0.453%
2021	9	2,031	0.01%	0.423%
2025	2	133	0.001%	0.088%

== Leaders ==
- Marc-Boris St-Maurice (2000–2004)
- Blair Longley (since 2004)

== Provincial parties ==
In addition to the Bloc Pot party in Quebec, the Marijuana Party has several separate provincial counterparts. The most notable is the British Columbia Marijuana Party (which received over 3% of the vote in the 2001 provincial election), the Alberta Marijuana Party led by Kenneth Kirk, and the Marijuana Party of Nova Scotia. The Bloc Pot and the federal Marijuana Party work together; however, the BC Marijuana Party and the federal Marijuana Party do not work together as the BC Party Marijuana decided to direct their activism into mainstream political parties.

== See also ==
- Cannabis in Canada
- Drug policy reform
- Legal issues of cannabis
- Marijuana Party candidates in the 2000 Canadian federal election
- Marijuana Party candidates in the 2004 Canadian federal election
- Marijuana Party candidates in the 2006 Canadian federal election
- Marijuana Party candidates in the 2008 Canadian federal election
- Marijuana Party candidates in the 2011 Canadian federal election
- Marijuana parties
