= Runnymede (disambiguation) =

Runnymede is a meadow alongside the River Thames in England, associated with the signing of Magna Carta.

Runnymede may also refer to:

== Places ==
=== Australia ===
- Runnymede, Queensland, a locality in the South Burnett Region, Queensland
- Runnymede, Tasmania, a locality in Tasmania

=== Canada ===
- Runnymede, Saskatchewan, an organized hamlet
- Runnymede, Toronto, a neighbourhood in Toronto, Ontario
- Runnymede Park, a park in Toronto, Ontario
- Runnymede (TTC), a subway station in Toronto, Ontario
- Runnymede Road, a street in Toronto, Ontario
- Runnymede Theatre, a theatre in Toronto, Ontario

=== Sierra Leone ===
- Runnymede, the official residence of Her Majesty's High Commissioner to Sierra Leone in Freetown.

=== United Kingdom ===
- Borough of Runnymede, Surrey, England
- Air Forces Memorial (British Air Forces Memorial)

=== United States ===
- Runnymeade, Delaware, US
- Runnymede, Kansas, US
- Runnemede, New Jersey, US

== Organizations ==
- Runnymede Trust, a think tank
- Runnymede Collegiate Institute, Toronto, Canada
- Runnymede College, Madrid, Spain

== Other uses ==
- Runnymede-class large landing craft, a heavy utility landing craft of the US Army
- Runnymede, a fictive Maryland town that straddles the Mason-Dixon Line in some novels of Rita Mae Brown
- Runnymede (ship) – one of several vessels by that name
