= Runnymede, Toronto =

Runnymede
- Neighbourhood
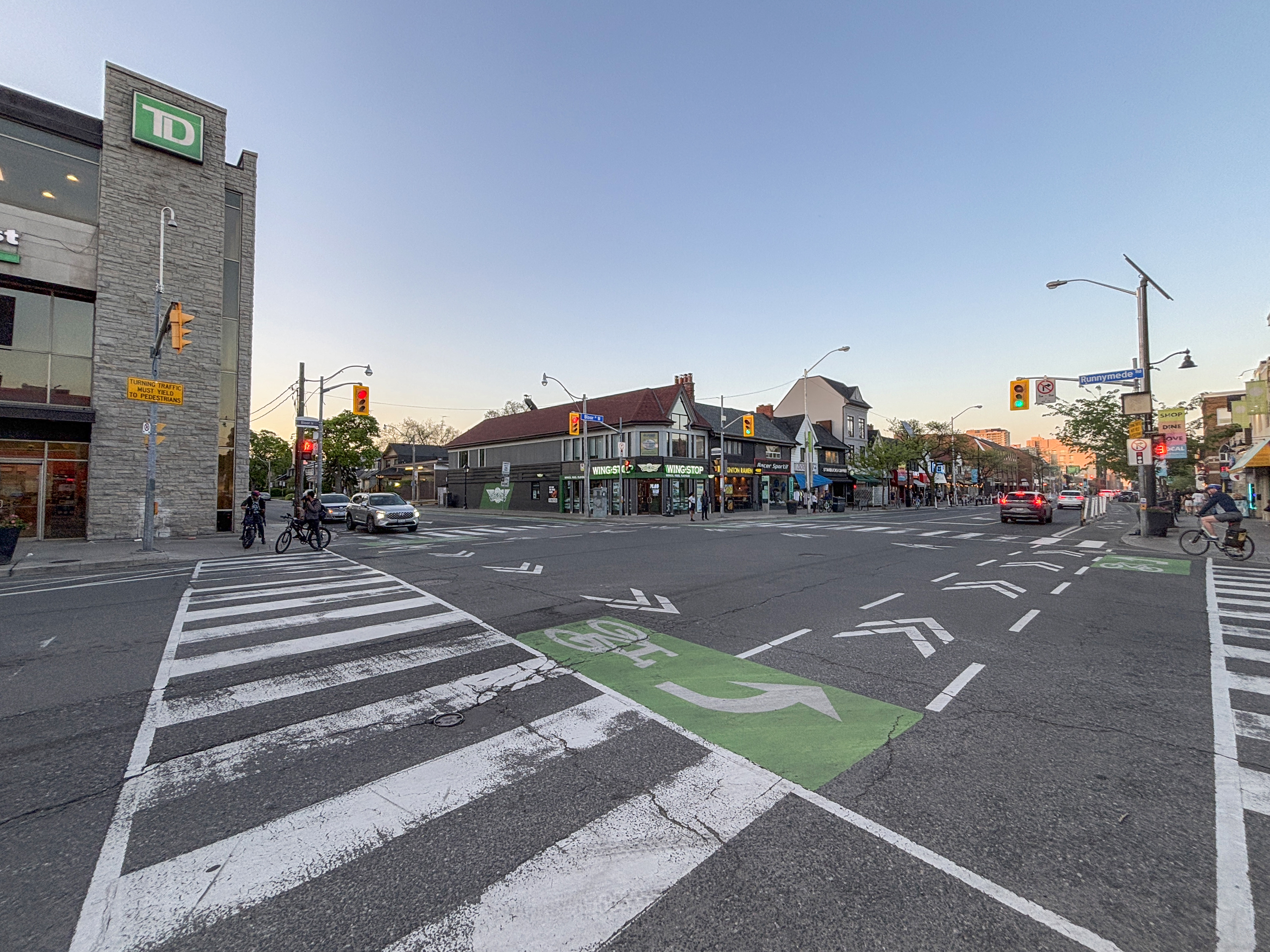
- View of Runnymede from Bloor Street West at Runnymede Road in 2025

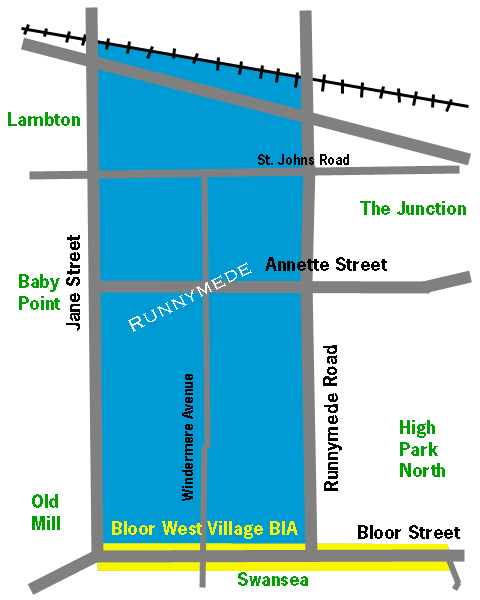
- Runnymede Bloor West Village BIA neighbourhood map

- Location within Toronto
- Coordinates: 43.6595°N 79.4840°W
- Country: Canada
- Province: Ontario
- City: Toronto
- Community: Old Toronto
- Changed Municipality: 1998

Government
  - Federal M.P.: Karim Bardeesy (Liberal)
  - Provincial M.P.P.: Alexa Gilmour (NDP)
  - City Councillor: Gord Perks (Parkdale—High Park)

Runnymede is a neighbourhood in Toronto, Ontario, Canada located north of Bloor Street West between Jane Street and Runnymede Road north to Dundas Street West. It is located directly north of the former village of Swansea and west of the High Park North neighbourhood. The immediate area around Bloor Street is commonly known as Bloor West Village after the shopping area along Bloor Street, whereas the area to the north is considered the Runnymede neighbourhood.

== Character ==
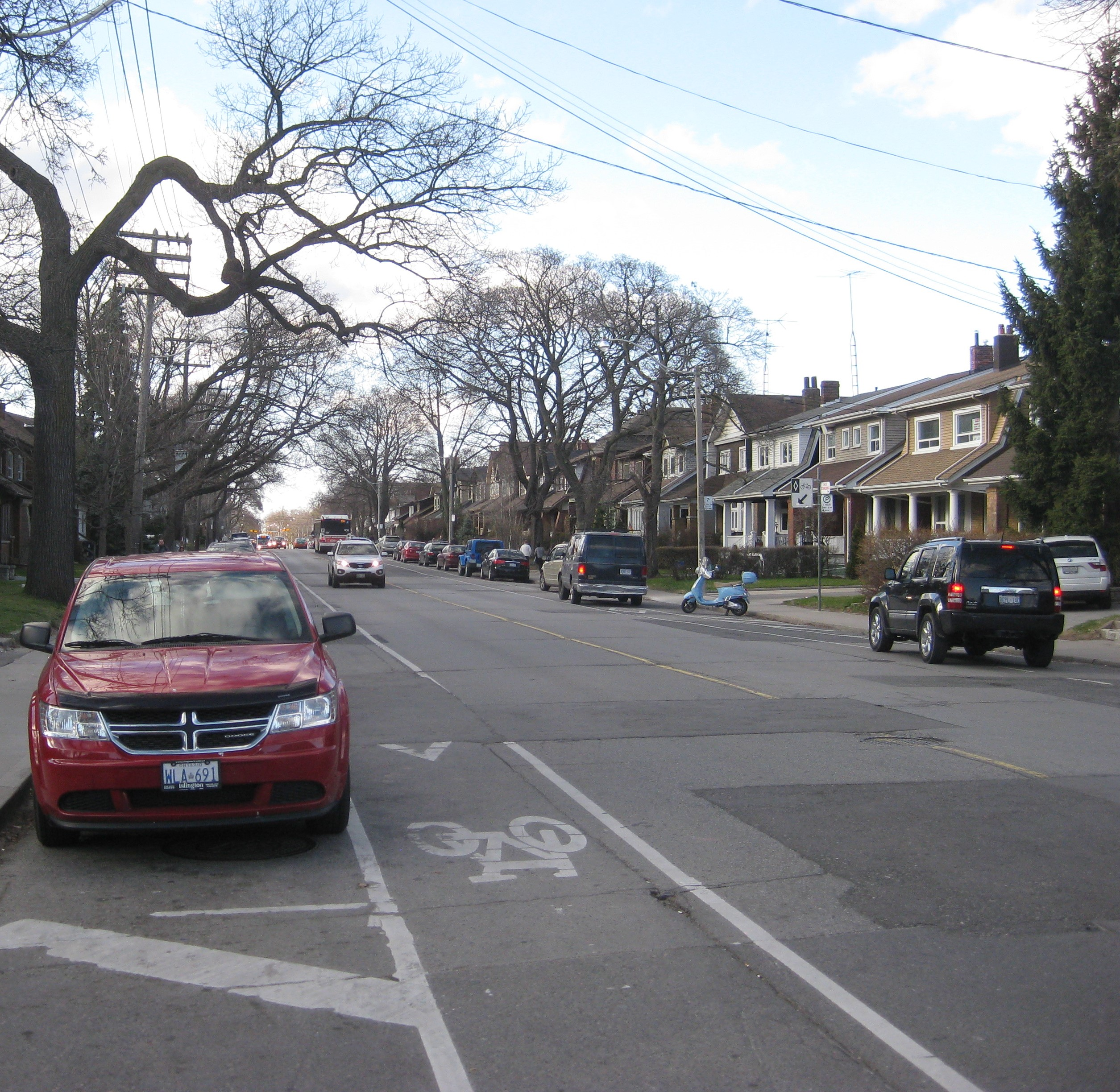
Houses in Runnymede are generally two-story brick houses.

Houses in this neighbourhood are generally (often American craftsman style) two-story brick houses, however renovations are becoming popular and many of the traditional homes are being torn down to create larger, more modern homes. The tree-lined streets in this area, which was annexed by the city of Toronto in 1909 make this a popular residential neighbourhood. Much of its development was originally due to the creation of a streetcar line along Bloor Street, which the TTC later replaced by the Bloor-Danforth subway line, built in the 1960s.

In the Toronto Official Plan, Runnymede is predominantly designated as a neighbourhood. In addition to housing, this classification allows for uses which meet resident needs such as schools, small shops, parks, etc.

Great care is taken to ensure the character of Toronto neighbourhoods is preserved, thus the addition of high-rise apartments is not permitted, and new businesses in the community must prove that they will not produce adverse effects to residents, such as noise pollution or increased traffic. They must also fit well with existing businesses and reduce frequency of automobile use in the neighbourhood (i.e. by providing a needed service within walking distance).

== History ==
The name Runnymede originates with the estate of John Scarlett, an early land owner in the area. Scarlett owned land in the area as early as 1817. He gave the name Runnymede to his house on Dundas Street. In 1856, Scarlett's holdings bounded by Jane, St. Clair, Clendenan and Annette were purchased by Marcus Rossin, who sub-divided the lands as the "Runnymede Estate". The sub-division was vacant until 1878.

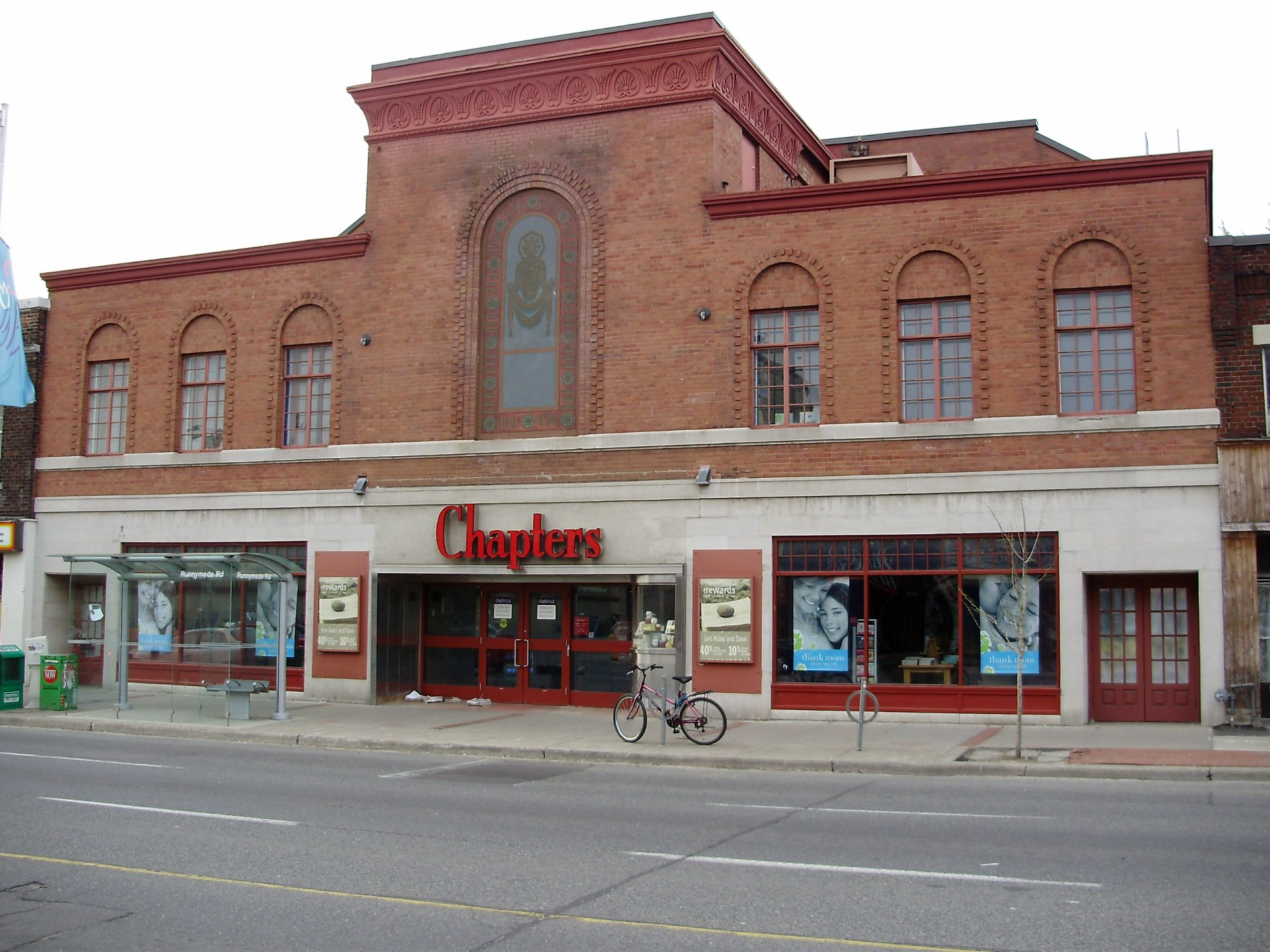
Chapters' move into the former Runnymede Theatre in the late 1990s was controversial with the local residents.

The neighourhood's first residents were largely Irish and Anglo-Saxon, followed eventually by immigrants of Eastern European origin.

The neighbourhood has a history of opposing large scale redevelopment. In 1966, Romark Developments proposed the construction of a giant apartment complex at Bloor and Jane streets. The plan proposed the construction of 15 apartment buildings (one as high as 38 storeys), shopping centres and open space. The project was estimated to cost $60 million to construct. It would have ranged from Bloor and Jane Street east to Runnymede Road and north to Colbeck Street. Over 1,000 ratepayers came out at a public meeting on March 7, 1966 at Runnymede School to oppose the project.

A great furore accompanied the arrival of a Chapters bookstore at the Runnymede Theatre in the late 1990s. Aside from discontent about the effect of a large bookstore undermining older local businesses, many residents were upset that the local historic movie theatre was going to be gutted to make room for the new store. However, the arrival of Chapters allowed restoration of the historical Runnymede Theatre. At the time, Chapters was the only company willing to make the $5 million investment necessary to restore the building. The movie theatre closed in February 1999. The Chapters bookstore also closed, and it is now a Shoppers Drug Mart.

The historic fire hall (Fire Station 424) established in 1928 was closed in 2014 due to budget cuts but was re-opened in 2016 to house members of the Fire Prevention and Public Education Division.

== Culture ==
The neighbourhood has two Toronto Public Library locations, Runnymede and Annette, and there is a nearby location in Swansea.

The BIA hosts:

- Annual Ukrainian Festival in September (music, foods and crafts).
- July Festival, which is a local fair of amusements and entertainment.
- Halloween Festival on Armadale Avenue, Beresford Avenue and Glendonwynne Road (family-friendly activities).
- Participates in the Toronto citywide "Cavalcade of Lights" (December)

=== Bloor West Village shopping district ===
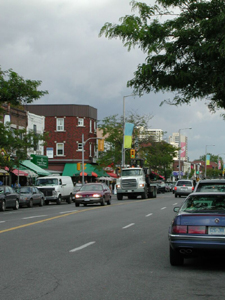
Bloor West Village is a shopping district located along the southern portion of Runnymede.

Bloor West Village is a shopping district in Toronto, Ontario, Canada. Bloor West is perceived as a district because the elements and characteristics that make it up make it easily identifiable both from the inside and from the outside. These same characteristics make it stand out and give it a different feel from adjacent areas. Located along Bloor Street, it encompasses all businesses along Bloor Street between Jane Street and Ellis Park Road, consisting of more than 400 shops, restaurants and services. The mix of stores, which include specialty clothing stores, book stores, restaurants and cafes, creates a vibrant, positive space for residents to fulfill basic needs and interact with the rest of the community.

The district includes many features which contribute to its lively character. It promotes pedestrian activity through the use of wide sidewalks, benches, tree-lined streets, and frequently used outdoor cafes. This atmosphere makes Bloor St. West the predominant public space in the neighbourhood, and it is full of activity at any given time during the day.

Bloor West Village caters mainly to neighbourhood residents, it has a number of small-scale, resident-owned stores which meet needs of community members, but lacks the uniqueness which would generate significant activity from non-residents.

== Demographic ==
In the 2006 census of Canada, 10.7% of immigrants identified their place of Origin as the United Kingdom, 11.4% said Polish, and 9.6% said Ukrainian. A total of 18.8% of residents (omitting those whose first language was English or French) identified Ukrainian as their first language. This is the most common non-official language spoken in the neighbourhood. This census estimated the number of residents within the neighbourhood as 9,565. A total of 37% are between the ages of 30 and 49, 26% between the ages of 0 and 19, 11% between the ages of 20 and 29 and 15% are 60+. From the total population only 13% of the residents do not belong to a census family. This indicates that one of the main characteristics of Bloor West is that it is largely made up of young families.

== Education ==
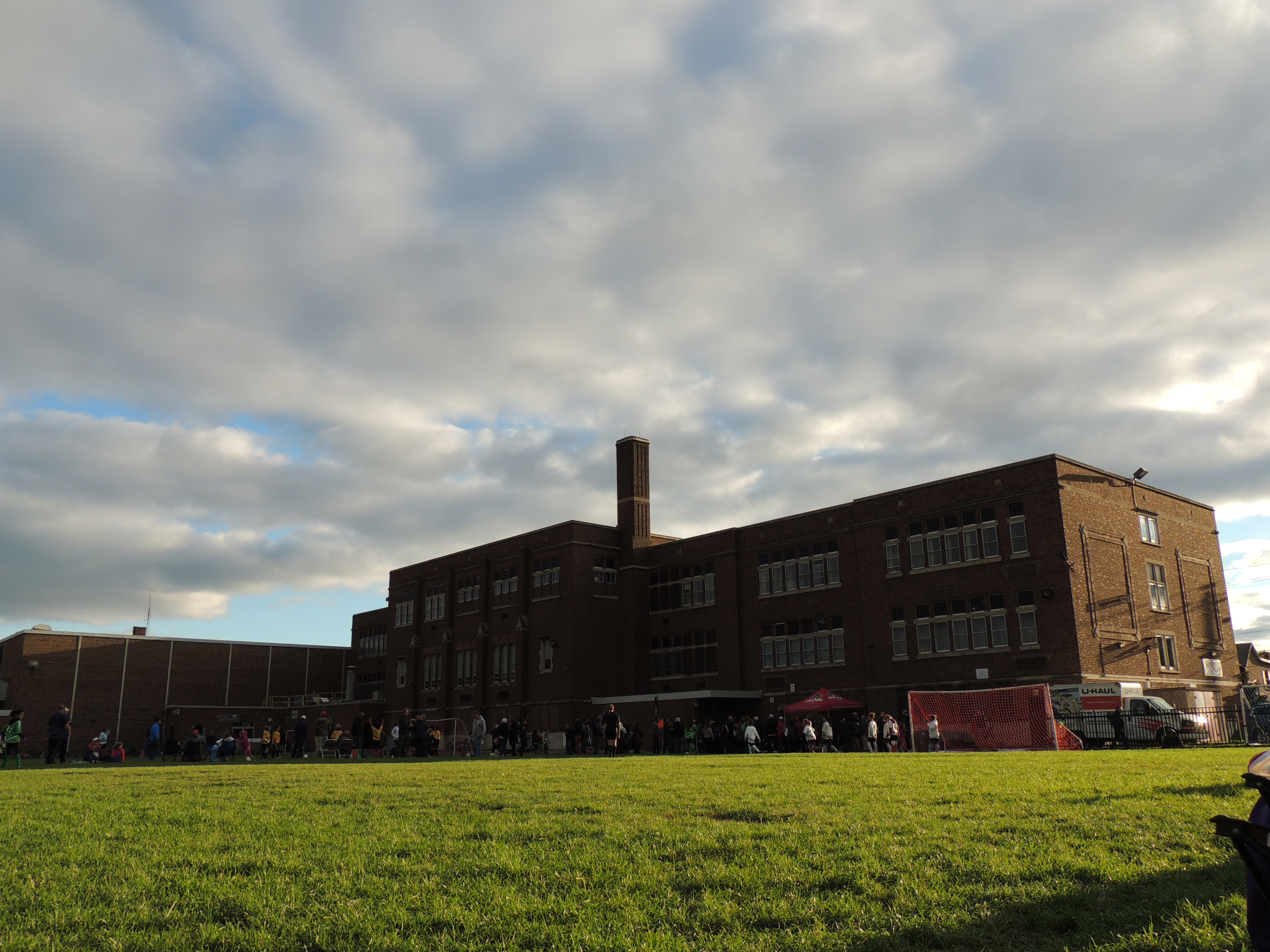
Runnymede Collegiate Institute is a secondary school operated by the Toronto District School Board.

The Toronto District School Board (TDSB) is an English secular public school board that presently serves the City of Toronto, including the neighbourhood of Runnymede. The school board operates numerous secondary schools in the neighbourhood, including Runnymede Collegiate Institute, Ursula Franklin Academy, Western Technical-Commercial School, and Humberside Collegiate Institute. In addition, TDSB also operates several elementary schools in the area. They are:

- King George Junior Public School is a public elementary school located on Rexford Road. It first opened in 1911, the year of King George V's coronation, it replaced Elizabeth Street School, built in 1882. The present building opened in 1964. King George houses a Learning Enrichment Before and After School Program for children 6 to 12 years of age.
- Runnymede Public School is a public elementary school on Runnymede Road. It has grades JK-8 and has around 1100 students enrolled. The school was founded in 1913 as a one-room schoolhouse.

In addition, the city's public English separate school board, Toronto Catholic District School Board (TCDSB), also operates several schools in the neighbourhood. The TCDSB operates two elementary schools. They are:

- St Pius X Catholic School, an elementary school located on Jane Street, just north of Bloor Street. The school has a mandatory blue and white dress code. The school's religion program teaches Catholic faith and is integrated closely to St. Pius X Catholic Church.
- James Culnan Catholic School, an elementary school located on Willard Avenue and offers Junior Kindergarten to Grade 8 education, with an extended French program starting in Grade 5. The current enrollment is 421 students and the principal is Gianna Helling. The school, named for trustee James Culnan, was opened in 1970 with the official opening and blessing 6 June 1971. Although the main entrance is on Willard Avenue, houses on both it and Windermere Avenue were expropriated to allow for the building of the school. In 1995 the school celebrated its 25th anniversary with a special mass at St. James Church. James Culnan was a trustee for 37 years, until his death in 1964, and was knighted by Pope Pius XII in 1957 in honour of his work with the Metropolitan Separate School Board, today the Toronto Catholic District School Board. The school has a mandatory blue and white dress code. The school's religion program teaches Catholic faith and is integrated closely to St James Parish.

In addition to the TCDSB and TDSB, two other public school boards also operate in the City of Toronto. Conseil scolaire Viamonde is a secular French public school board, while the Conseil scolaire de district catholique Centre-Sud is a French separate public school board. However, neither French-language school board operates a school in Runnymede.

== Transportation ==
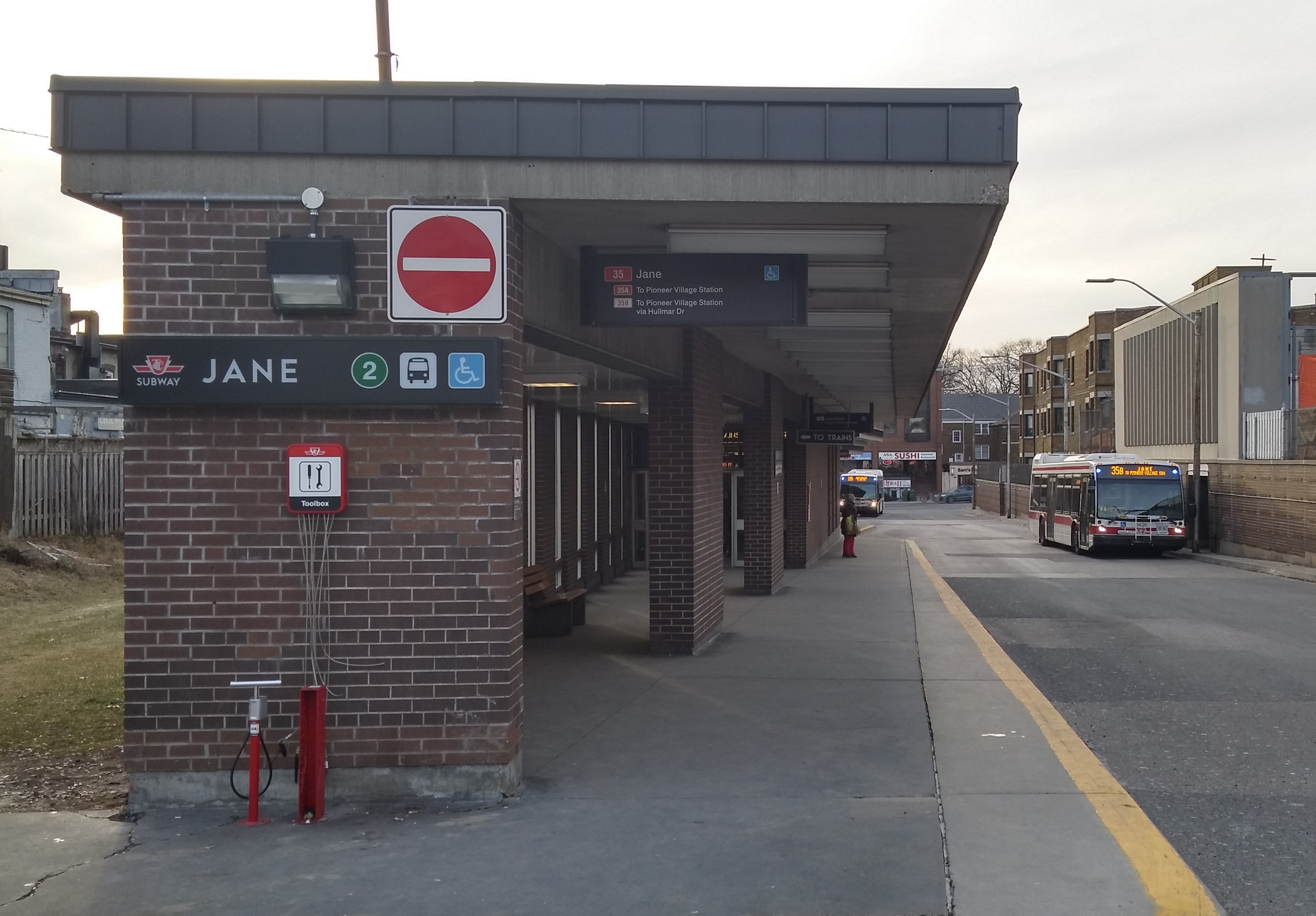
A TTC bus outside Jane station bus platforms. Jane station is a subway station located at the southwest corner of Runnymede.

Two major transportation nodes are defined in the neighbourhood by subway stations at either end of Bloor Street (served by the Bloor-Danforth line), at Jane Street and Runnymede Road. Buses runs north from Jane Station and north and south from Runnymede Stations. Annette Street is served by a bus line from Jane Station. A night bus replaces the subway line during the early morning hours along Bloor Street. Bike Lanes have been incorporated into the neighbourhood as well along Runnymede Road. This is something new and adds to the transit modes of the neighbourhood. This is a positive implementation because there has been an increase – from 1.75% to 3.13%- in the number of residents that use cycling as a mode of transportation.

=== Main streets ===
The major streets are Bloor Street, Jane Street, and Runnymede Road. Bloor Street, the main thoroughfare, is a four-lane major arterial road, lined with mainly commercial and retail, predominately two-storey buildings with a retail first floor and residential on the upper floors. Most businesses are local stores and restaurants and there are some chains of fast-food restaurants. Most businesses found along Bloor are local and in this respect they are unique but they still have to compete with modern chain businesses in the area, such as clothing stores, cafes and grocery stores. In the Official Plan –which discusses the intended pattern of future growth – Bloor Street has been identified as an area for potential intensification which will turn this street into an avenue. In order to allow for this density intensification, zoning amendments are to take place. For instance the maximum height for buildings in the area is 5 stories, however along Bloor, they are allowing for a maximum height of 8 stories.

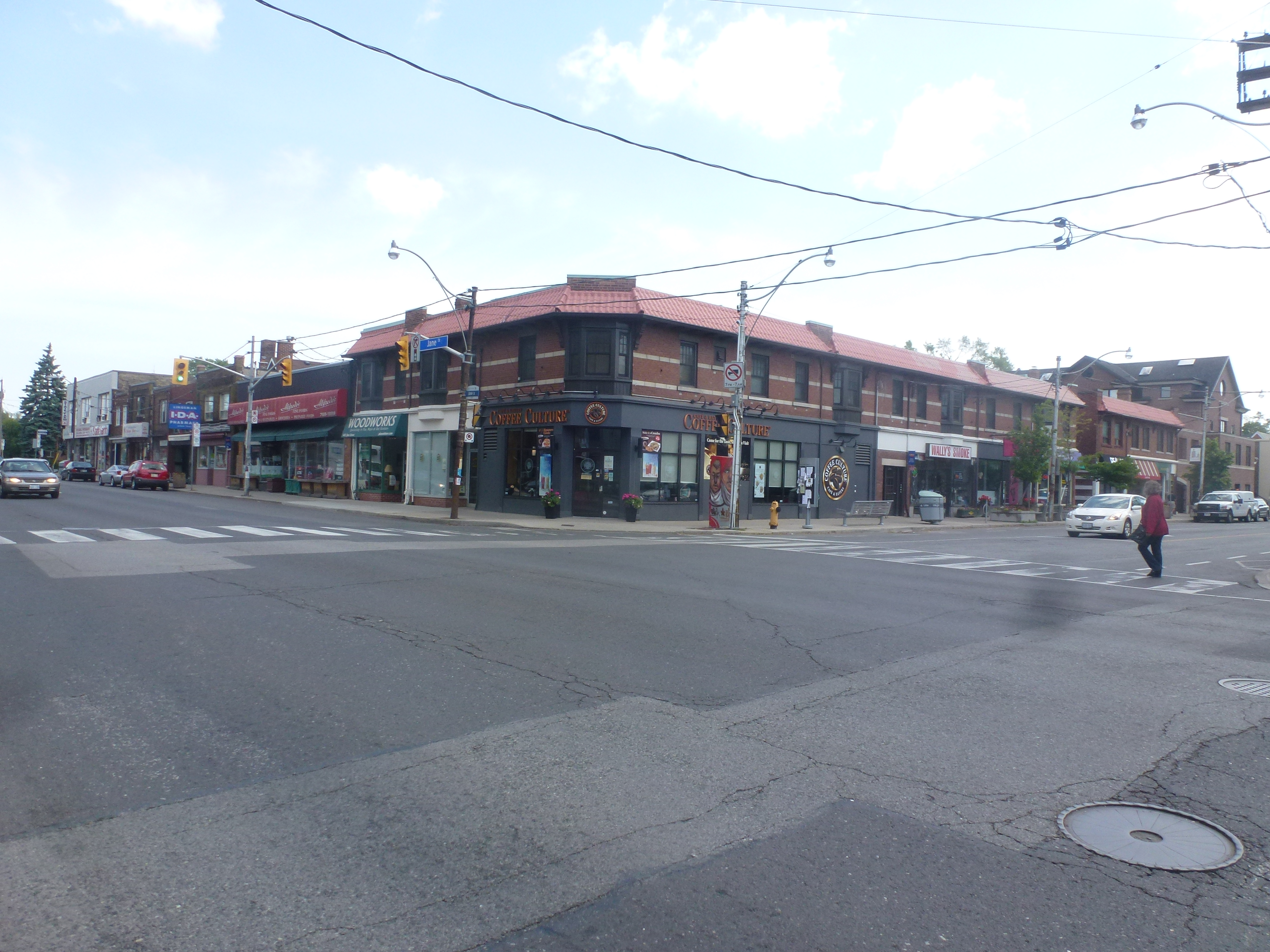
View of Runnymede from the intersection of Annette and Jane Street. Jane Street serves as Runnymede's western boundary.

The businesses are organized into the Bloor-West Village Business Improvement Association. The Runnymede Library is also located on Bloor. Jane Street, which is a four-lane major arterial road running north from Bloor, changes along its length within the neighbourhood, being predominantly commercial and retail around Bloor Street and Annette. Annette, in the northern part of the neighbourhood, is a four-lane minor arterial road, which runs east-west and is predominantly residential with some schools and the Annette Library located along the street. Bloor Street and Jane Street, as the main streets in the neighbourhood, serve as both edges that separate BWV from adjacent neighbourhoods and as paths to connect people from one place to another. Any activity or social interaction only really occurs along Bloor Street; part of the reason is that it has many points of interests along the way. That the sidewalks are quite lengthy also contributes to this activity. However, the opposite is true for the minor roads; they serve strictly as pathways, not as a place to interact. Runnymede Road, which runs north-south, is also classified as a minor arterial road with predominantly residential land use, and includes Runnymede Junior and Senior Public School, as well as Runnymede United Church. The land use becomes more mixed approaching Annette St. and Dundas St. W. Dundas is another major arterial in the neighbourhood, but it is not as dominant as the other four.

While Bloor St. West is always full of life, local roads within the neighbourhood are very quiet. For the most part, these roads are used simply as pathways to get out of the neighbourhood, and not as public space where people choose to spend time, as is the case with Bloor. As the inner neighbourhood consists almost entirely of housing, rather than a mix of businesses, the streets are relatively quiet. This is an advantage to the many residents who have young children.

In Toronto’s zoning maps, which designate the permitted land uses in a given area, the arterial roads making up the borders of the neighbourhood (Jane, Runnymede, and Bloor) are zoned as mixed use. The local roads within are predominantly residential, with the exception of Annette (a minor arterial road). This creates clearly identifiable boundaries around the neighbourhood. The creation of such a hard edge may discourage residents from interacting with adjacent neighbourhoods.
