= Runnymede Theatre =

Former theater in Toronto, Canada

Coordinates: 43.650730°N 79.476530°W

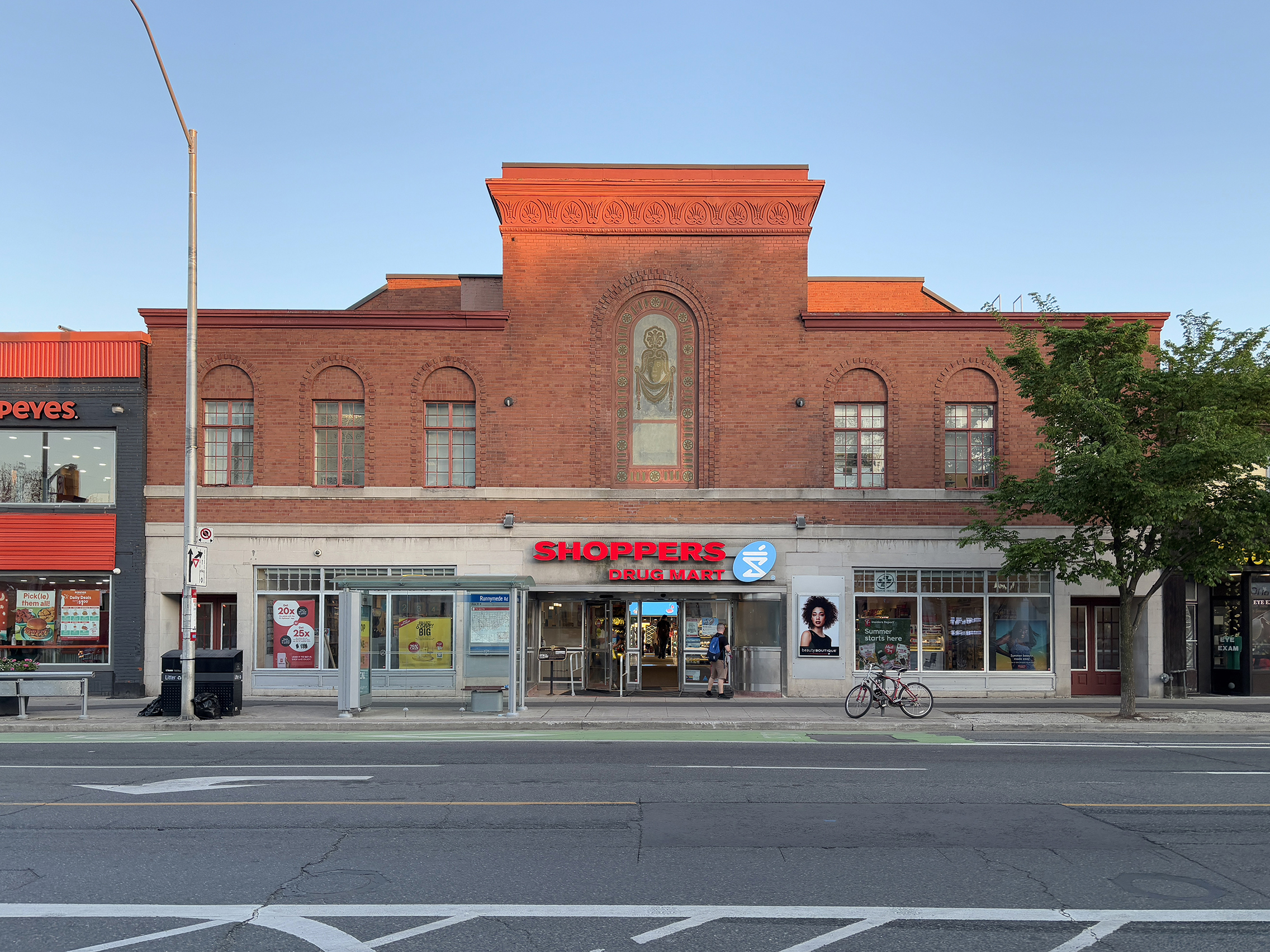
- The building as a Shoppers Drug Mart in 2025.

General information
- Location: 2223 Bloor Street West, Toronto, Ontario, Canada
- Opened: June 1927; 99 years ago

Other information
- Public transit: Runnymede station

Ontario Heritage Act
- Designated: 1990

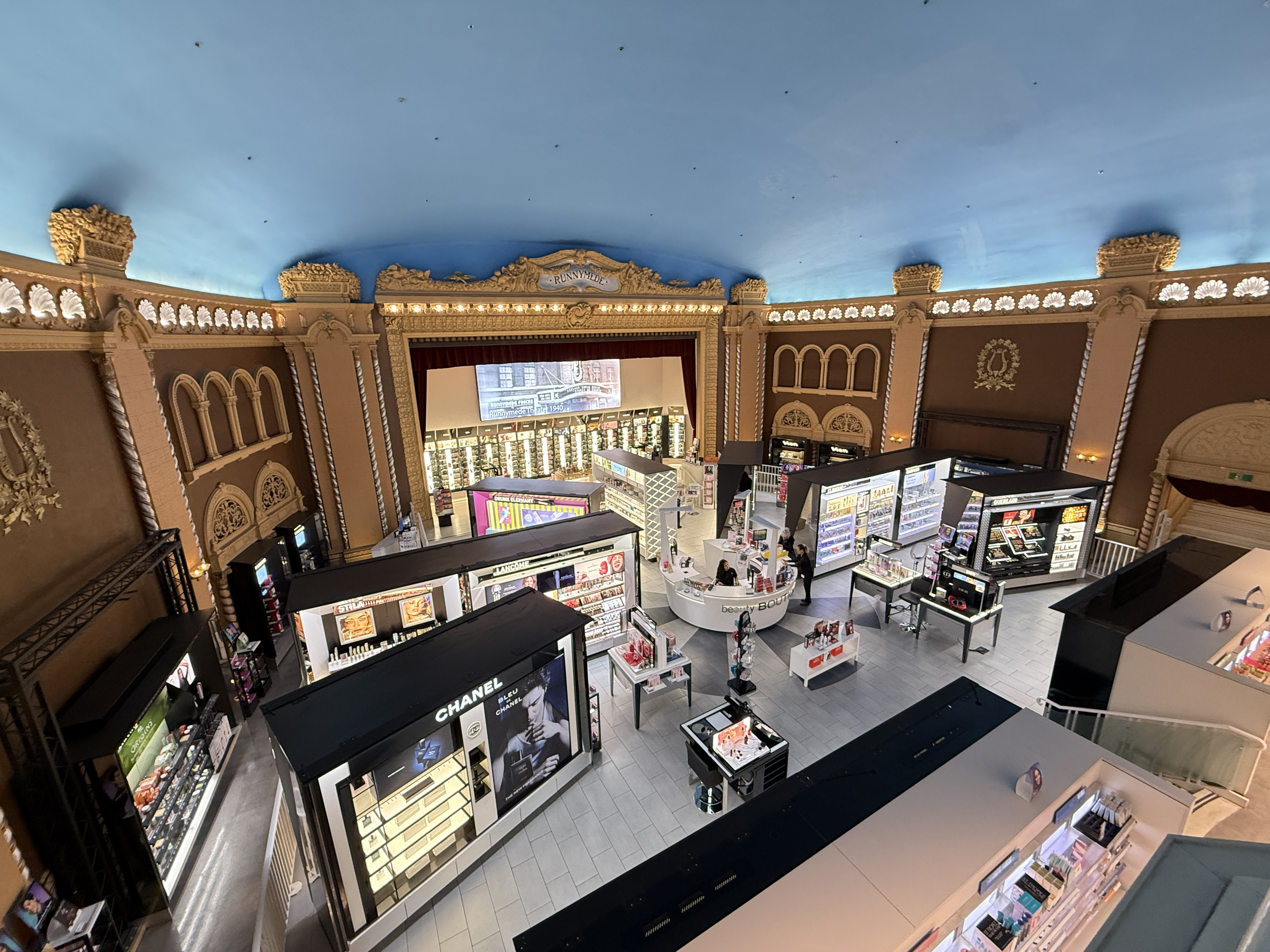
Interior of the former theatre.

The Runnymede Theatre is a historic building located in Bloor West Village, an affluent west end Toronto neighbourhood. The building has operated as a vaudeville theatre, a movie theatre, a bingo hall, and a Chapters bookstore. The building is now a Shoppers Drug Mart.

== History ==
Commonly known as the "Runny", the Runnymede was built by the Capitol (later Famous Players) as an atmospheric vaudeville theatre, the first of this type in Toronto. It officially opened in June 1927. The building was designed by Alfred Chapman, father of Chris Chapman, an accomplished Toronto filmmaker. Known for its music and stage shows, the large 1400-seat theatre, branded "Canada's Theatre Beautiful", quickly became popular and brought prestige to the west end of the city. As an atmospheric theatre, the interior of the Runnymede was designed to transport its guests to an exotic place. The painted blue sky ceiling was adorned with clouds, where a complex lighting system projected an array of stars and airplanes. The walls were decorated with a mural, which produced an illusion of being in a courtyard.

The building discontinued to be used for plays and live entertainment with the gradual death of vaudeville, and was subsequently converted to a movie theatre in the late 1930s. In the early 1970s, the building became a bingo hall in order to capitalize on bingo's popularity. In 1980, the building reopened as a movie theatre again, featuring two screens. In 1990, the building was designated as a heritage property under the Ontario Heritage Act. The movie theatre closed in February 1999 and You've Got Mail was the last film that was shown. Later that year, the building reopened as a Chapters bookstore, which closed in February 2014. In April 2015, the building reopened as a Shoppers Drug Mart.

== See also ==
- Runnymede, Toronto
