= Jean Hall =

Canadian architect

- Born: Jean Hall; 1896; Toronto, Ontario, Canada
- Died: 1982 (aged 85–86)
- Education: University of Toronto
- Known for: Architecture

Jean Hall (1896–1982) was a Canadian architect, the second woman to graduate from the architecture program from the University of Toronto in 1923 after Esther Hill. She was the first Canadian trained female architect to design a building in Canada, which is a fourplex built in 1925 through her father's building firm. She was considered talented in mechanical drawing and painting.

== Education ==
Hall graduate from General Arts at the University of Toronto, and did not feel that an art degree would suit her career. and then went on to begin her training in architecture in 1917 with support and encouragement of her father. During her studies in 1922, she served as the vice-president of the University Architectural Club. Shortly after graduation, she designed the landmark fourplex located at 63 Jerome Street in Toronto (43.660855°N 79.457266°W) located in the West bend neighbourhood in High Park North.

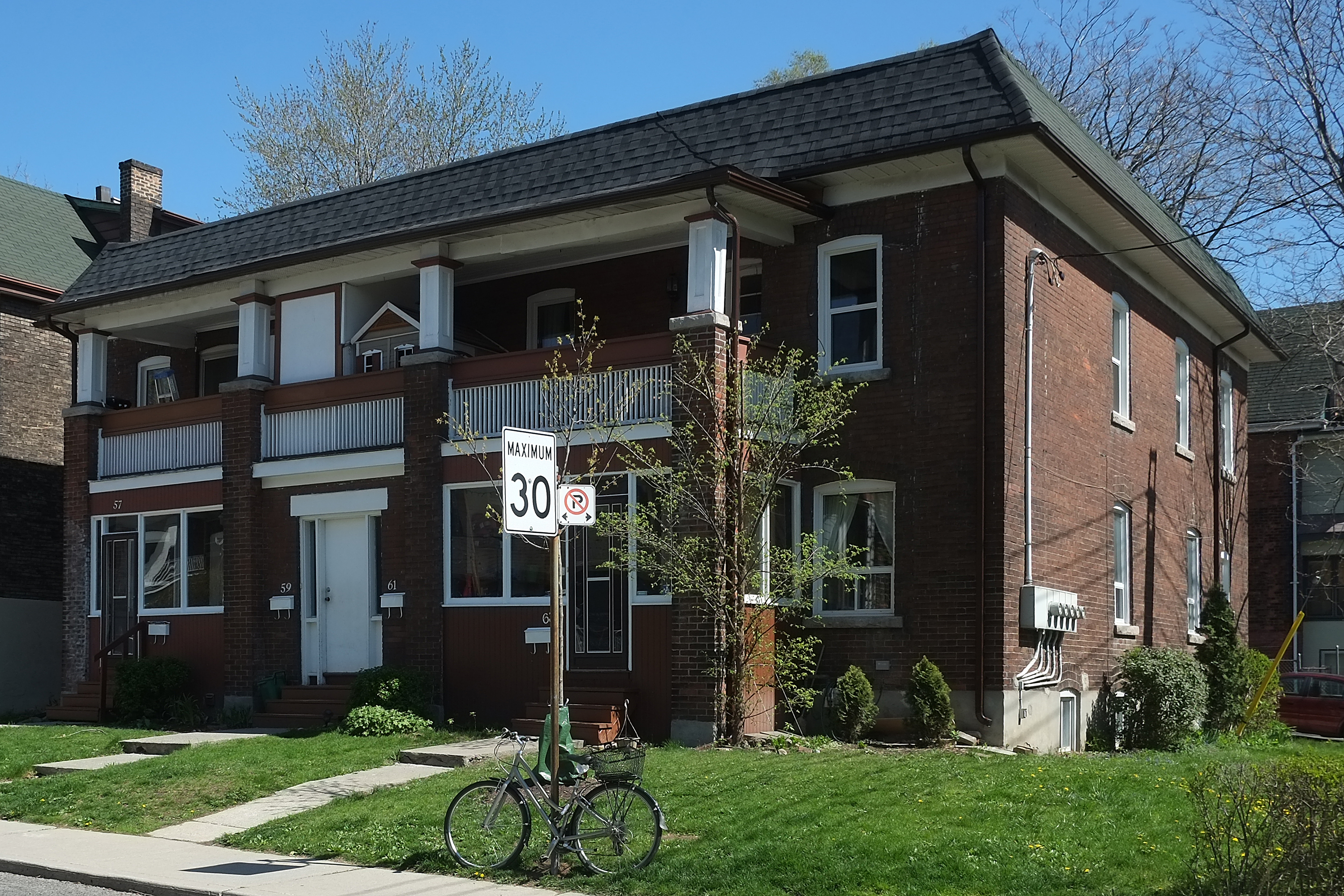
The fourplex at 63 Jerome Street Toronto designed by Jean Hall

== Career ==
Hall was employed as an artist until 1927, but was to unable to launch her profession in architecture despite her initial success. Although Hall made many tries she could not find work in architecture, this was made worse due to the Great Depression, which resulted in the closure of her father's firm. She also worked as a medical claims processor for Toronto's Workmen's Compensation Board.
