= Humberside Collegiate Institute =

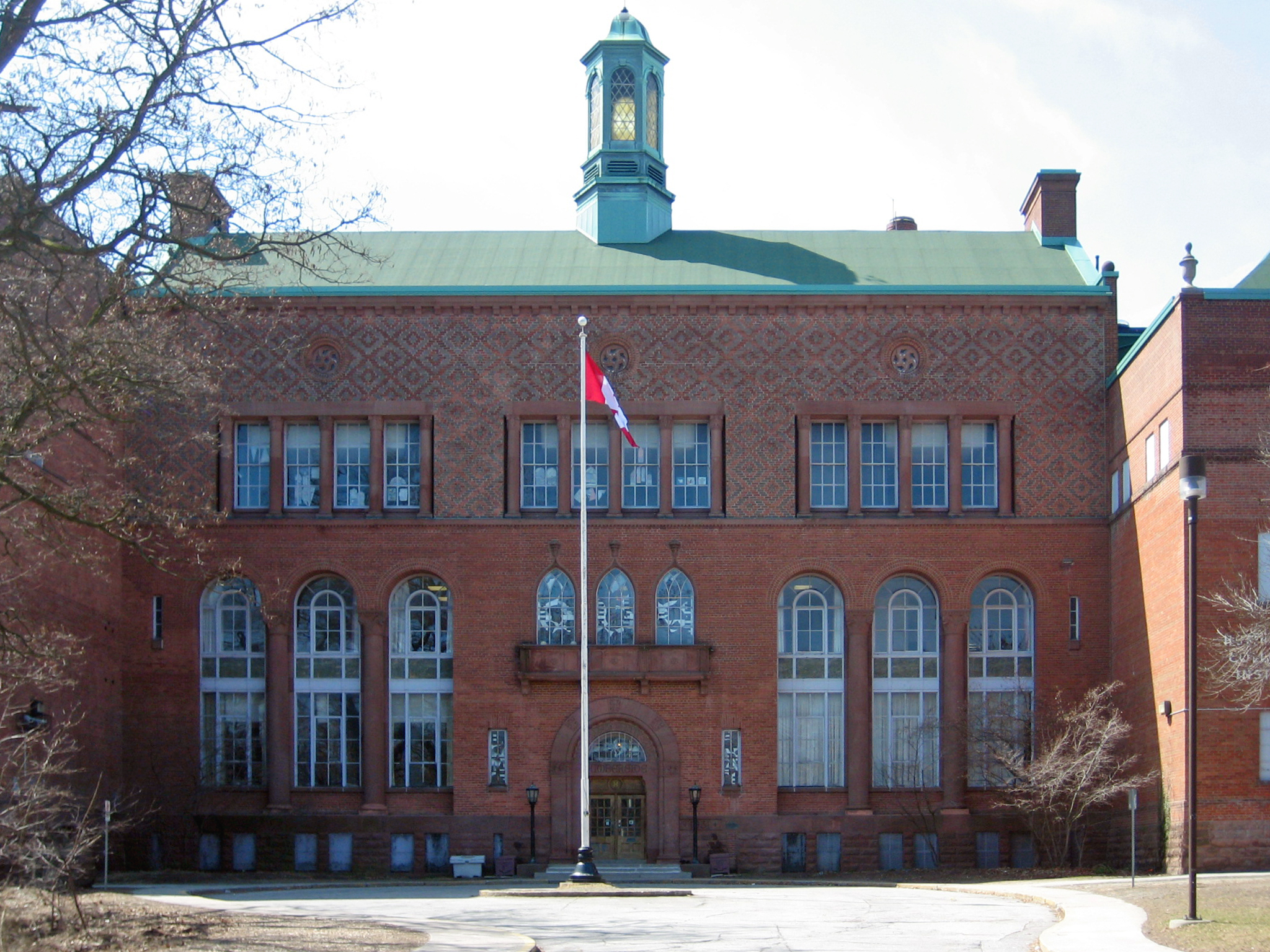

Location
- 280 Quebec Avenue; High Park North, Toronto, Ontario, M6P 2V3; Canada; 43.659943°N 79.470677°W

Information
- Former names: Toronto Junction High School (1892–1903); Toronto Junction Collegiate Institute (1903–1909)
- School type: High school
- Motto: Felix qui potuit rerum cognoscere causas. (Happy is he who knows the causes of (reasons for) things.)
- Founded: 1892
- School board: Toronto District School Board (Toronto Board of Education)
- Superintendent: Sandy Spyropoulos; LC4, Executive Superintendent; Tracy Hayhurst; LN20
- Area trustee: Debbie King; Ward 7
- School number: 5515 / 917630
- Principal: Jessica Pearson
- Vice Principal: Jacob Barghout, Adrienne Tranah
- Grades: 9–12
- Enrolment: 1300+
- Language: English, French, Spanish, Latin
- Schedule type: Semestered
- Colours: Garnet, Grey, and White
- Mascot: Husky
- Team name: Humberside Huskies
- Yearbook: Hermes
- Website: schoolweb.tdsb.on.ca/Humbersideci

Humberside Collegiate Institute (also known as Humberside CI, HCI, or Humberside), formerly known as Toronto Junction High School and Toronto Junction Collegiate Institute is a public high school located in Toronto, Ontario, Canada. It serves the Bloor West Village, Baby Point, High Park North and Junction neighbourhoods. Prior to 1998, it was within the Toronto Board of Education (TBE).

Humberside was established in 1892 and has an academic program for students in grades 9 through 12. In addition to the regular curriculum, the school has a strong music program, as well as an Extended French and French Immersion program. It is a semestered school, meaning that the students take eight classes in two semesters. The school was previously operated under a full-year, non-semestered schedule. This changed following the COVID-19 pandemic.

The motto of the school is "Felix qui potuit rerum cognoscere causas", a Latin phrase from Virgil's work Georgics, meaning "Happy is the person who has been able to learn the reasons for things".

== History ==
Humberside was established in 1892 as "Toronto Junction High School" in the basement of the local Presbyterian church. It moved to the current site in 1894 in the High Park area of Toronto, with the construction of a new Richardsonian Romanesque building. In 1903, the school was renamed "Toronto Junction Collegiate Institute", after a local street that runs west from Dundas Street West, past Keele Street to the school's main entrance. In 1909, the school was changed to "Humberside Collegiate Institute" and became part of the Toronto Board of Education when the Junction was annexed by the City of Toronto. In 1910 an addition was added by Charles Hartnoll Bishop. During World War I, many students lost their lives in battle. The front entrance is now a memorial to those who lost their lives, and for quite some time, it was not allowed to be used, until recently. Names were added to the memorial after World War II. The school's yearbook, Hermes, named for the Olympian god of the same name, was established in 1925. The student council was formed in 1931, and three decades later, the school held its first formal dance.

In the late 1920s, Group of Seven artist Arthur Lismer was commissioned by the school to paint what is thought to be the largest Canadian mural. After being restored the mural hangs in the school auditorium, which was renamed in 1992 as Lismer Hall.

1966 saw major renovations to the school. A new north wing was opened, which houses the science laboratories. A new library was also constructed, as well as a new structure at the back which housed the (then) new auditorium, and music facilities. In 1972, Humberside became one of the first schools to introduce computers as part of the curriculum. Extended French and French Immersion programs were introduced in 1980 and 1983, respectively. Humberside celebrated its centennial in 1992. In 1998, the TBE was dissolved and Humberside became part of the new Toronto District School Board (TDSB).

The school was used in the filming of the TV movie Cyber Seduction: His Secret Life in 2005.

In 2005, Mel Greif retired after thirty years of teaching history and geography. He won multiple awards for teaching, including the Jane Jacobs Prize and the Governor General's Award of Excellence.

== Notable alumni ==
- J. P. Anderson – former professional hockey player
- Isabel Bassett – former chair of TVOntario, who also previously taught at Humberside
- Samantha Bee – comedian, political commentator, cast member of The Daily Show with Jon Stewart, host of Full Frontal with Samantha Bee
- Jacqueline Brooks – equestrian Olympian, who represented Canada in team dressage in 2008 and 2012
- Nestor Chumak – bassist for PUP
- George Chuvalo – boxer, Canadian amateur heavyweight champion, twice fought Muhammad Ali
- Frederick J. Conboy – Mayor of Toronto, 1941 to 1944
- Royal Copeland, Canadian football player
- Donald Creighton – historian
- Henry Czerny – actor (The Boys of St. Vincent, Clear and Present Danger)
- Diego Fuentes – MuchMusic host, actor (Hollywoodland, Remedy)
- Abby Hoffman – athlete, represented Canada in 800-metre running in four Olympic Games: 1964, 1968, 1972 and 1976, carried the flag for Canada in 1976
- Melissa Humana-Paredes – beach volleyball player representing Canada, gold medalist 2019 Beach Volleyball World Championships, silver medalist 2024 Summer Olympics
- Angus MacDonell - professional hockey player, drafted in the sixth round, 189th overall in the 2023 NHL Draft by the Dallas Stars
- Bob Mackowycz Jr. – musician, writer and broadcaster; 2008 National Screen Institute Drama Prize winner
- Jeff Marek – television personality, podcaster and radio host, including Hockey Night in Canada
- Maris Martinsons – engineer, international athlete representing Canada and Latvia, management professor at City University of Hong Kong, business strategy consultant
- Ali Mukaddam – actor (Degrassi: The Next Generation, Miss Sloane)
- Kirsty Murray – award-winning novelist
- Zack Mykula – drummer for PUP
- Mark Simmons – boxer, represented Canada 2000 Summer Olympics, actor (Cinderella Man)
- Steve Sladkowski – guitarist for PUP
- Raymond Souster – poet, 1964 Governor General's Award winner (The Colour of the Times)
- Alexander Sowinski – drummer for BadBadNotGood
- Tibor Takács – director, producer
- Jan Tennant – journalist (CBC, Global)
- Peter Vronsky – author, historian and film director
- Charlotte Day Wilson – soul, Contemporary R&B singer

== See also ==
- Education in Ontario
- List of secondary schools in Ontario
