= Runnymede fire hall =

Fire hall in Toronto, Canada

Coordinates: 43.65835°N 79.47963°W

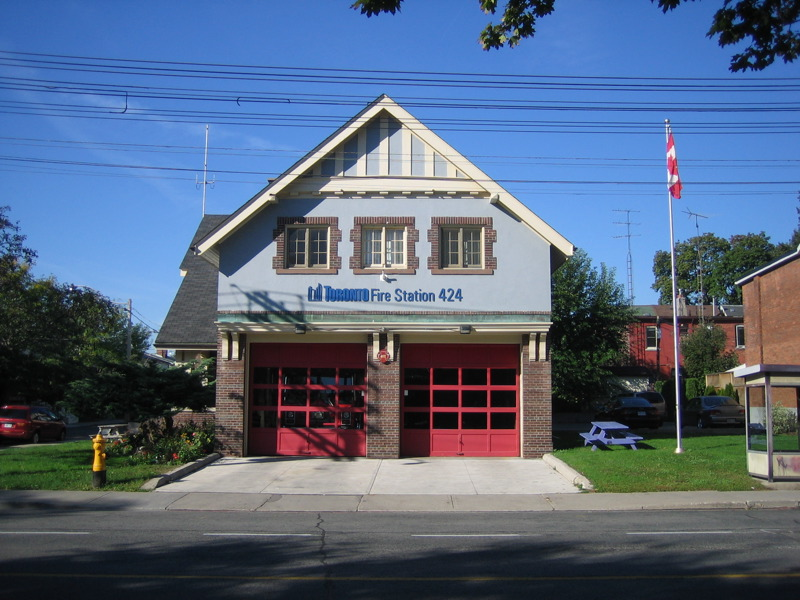
Runnymede Fire Hall

The Runnymede fire hall, also known as Fire Hall 424, is a fire hall in Runnymede, Toronto, operated by Toronto Fire Services from 1928 to 2014. Then-mayor Rob Ford ordered the fire hall shut down, as a cost-saving measure. Toronto Fire Services repurposed the heritage structure, and reopened it as a public education center, on October 13, 2016.

Recommendations that the fire hall be closed had been offered since at least 1987. Ford first attempted to have the station closed in 2012, but it received a brief reprieve, in 2013. The closure stirred controversy, with local residents concerned over slower response times from more distant fire halls.

The fire hall's architecture was considered sufficiently iconic for it to be considered a heritage structure, worthy of preservation. On October 13, 2016, the historic structure was reopened, in a public ceremony — but as a fire education centre, not an active fire station. While it will be capable of operating a fire engine, no engine will be stationed there. Instead, a fire captain and six fire educators will conduct fire safety outreach.

Local councilor, Sarah Doucette, celebrated its re-opening. She echoed the views of local residents who regretted it had not been restored to fully operational status.
