= Mel Greif =

Canadian public high school teacher

Mel (Miloš) Greif is a Canadian public high school teacher who taught history and geography at Humberside Collegiate Institute for over thirty years. There, he headed the history department, founded a charitable organization to begin collecting an archive of the history of the school, led a credit union for the local Czechoslovak community, and championed efforts to restore local artworks including a mural by Arthur Lismer "believed to be the largest mural in Canada". In this time he won multiple awards including the 2002 Jane Jacobs Prize and the 2001 Governor General's Award for Excellence in Teaching Canadian History.

Greif was born in Prague, and lived in a refugee camp until he was six, when his family moved to Canada. He is a graduate of the University of Toronto.
