= Runnymede Park =

Park in The Junction neighborhood of Toronto

Coordinates: 43.668238°N 79.479228°W

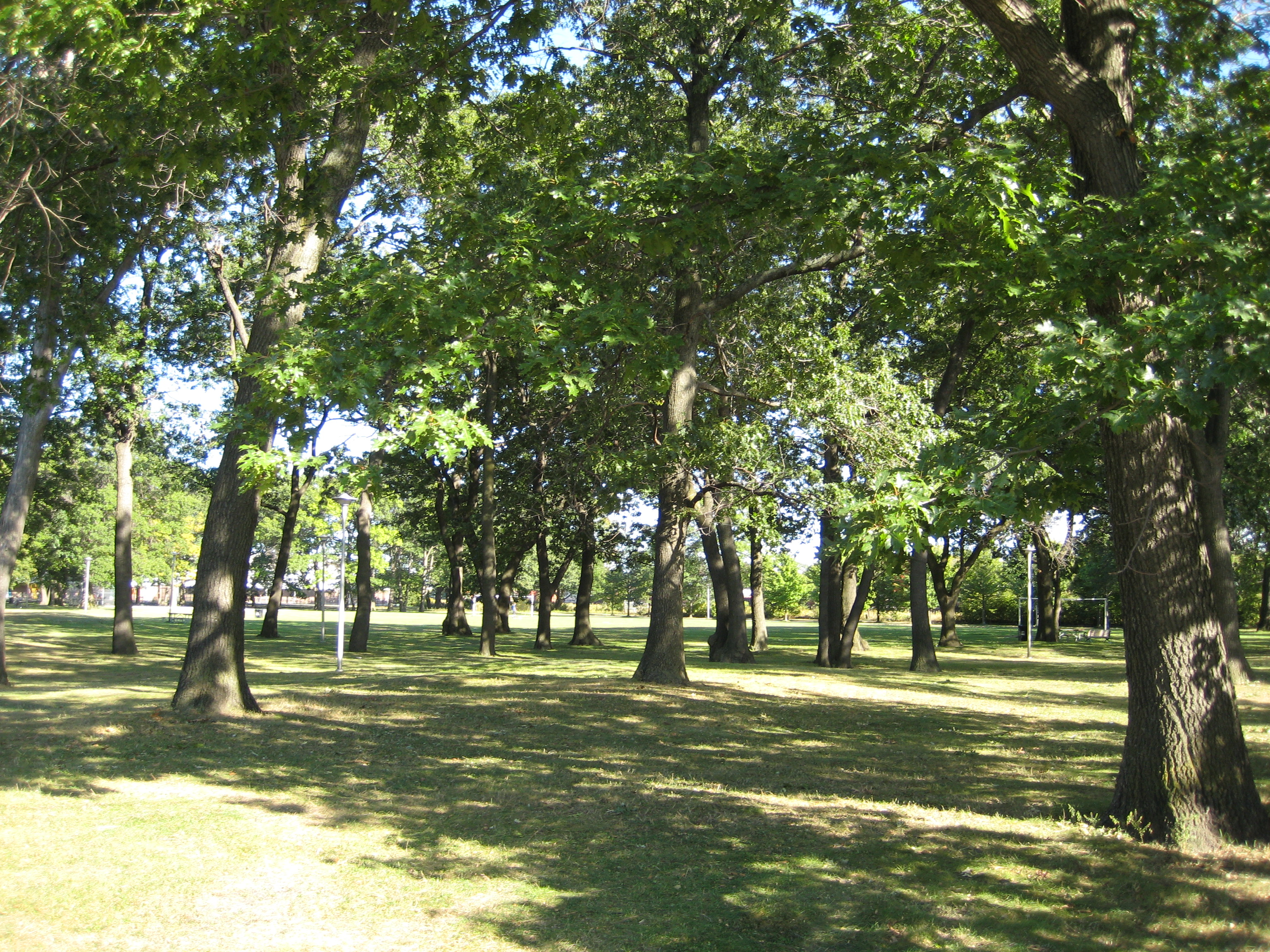
- Runnymede Park
- Interactive map of Runnymede Park
- Type: Public Park
- Location: Toronto, Ontario, Canada
- Operator: City of Toronto

Runnymede Park is a medium-sized public park located in The Junction neighbourhood of Toronto, Canada, one block east of Runnymede Road. Its southern boundary is the West Toronto Yard used by the Canadian Pacific Railway, its northern boundary is Ryding Avenue, while a laneway and parking lot make up the western and eastern boundaries respectively. It is relatively flat, and features many soaring mature oak trees.

== History ==
Runnymede Park was initially a block of land laid out on a plan created by Hannah M. Clarke in 1883. According to a City Solicitor's report, submitted to City of Toronto Council in 1923, the land was always treated by the Town of Toronto Junction as a public park and, from 1893 to 1909, was assessed by the Town of Toronto Junction as part of park property. It was subsequently recommended in 1923 that the City of Toronto exercise its rights as official title holder. In 1961, Toronto City Council authorized the construction of the George Bell Arena at Runnymede Park and its designation as a community centre under the Community Centres Act. Like many other landmarks in the neighbourhood, the park takes its name from the estate of John Scarlett, an early land owner in the area.

Runnymede Park was one of the few parks to have a railway siding running through it into the 2000s, not separated from the public area in any way. The siding was operated by the Canadian Pacific Railway serving local industries, though towards its end it only moved tank cars to the Bunge edible oils plant on the northwest corner of St. Clair Avenue West and Keele Street. It was finally put out of service when the plant closed in 2008, and the tracks through the park were removed in late October 2009.

== Culture and amenities ==
The park has a wading pool used in the summer, tennis courts, a soccer field, a baseball diamond, a bocce court and two playgrounds. It is the home of George Bell Arena, which features an ice rink used extensively by local hockey leagues.

The Maltese community of Toronto hosts an annual one-day festival in this park.
