= High Park North =

- Neighbourhood
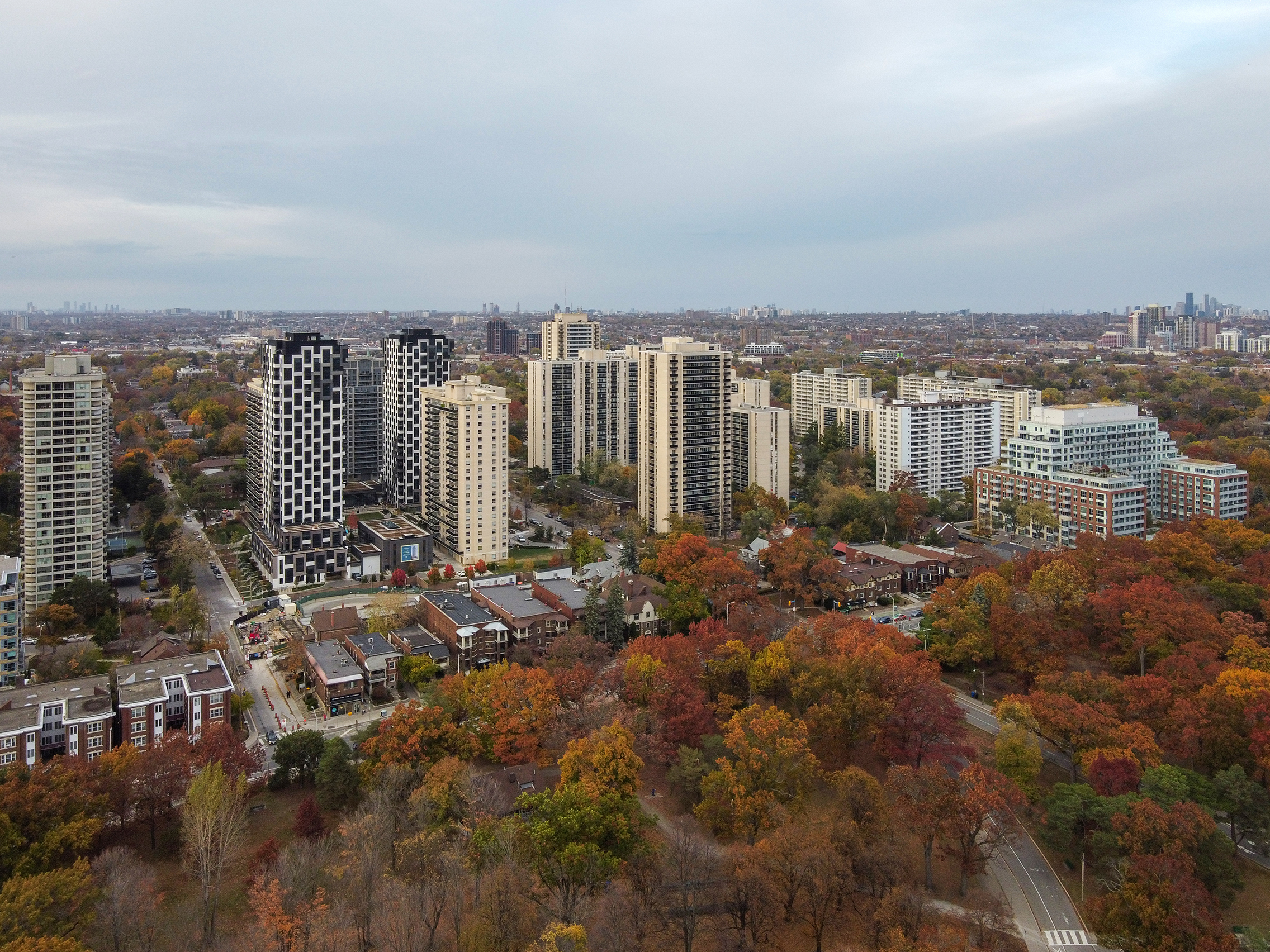
- Aerial view of apartments in High Park North from Bloor Street

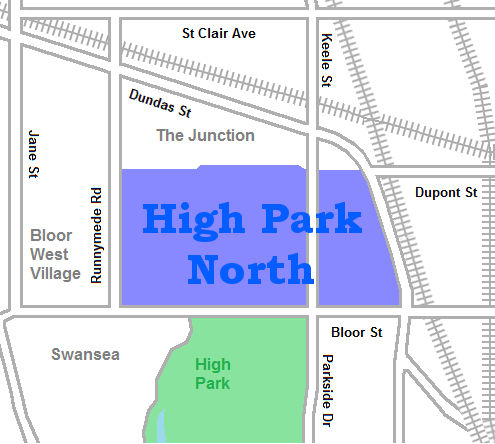
- Neighbourhood map of High Park North

- Location within Toronto
- Coordinates: 43.656°N 79.475°W
- Country: Canada
- Province: Ontario
- City: Toronto
- Community: Toronto & East York
- Established: 1883 (Subdivision)
- Changed Municipality: 1887 West Toronto from York; 1909 Toronto (former) from West Toronto; 1998 Toronto from Toronto (former)

Government
  - MP: Karim Bardeesy (Taiaiako'n—Parkdale—High Park) (federal electoral district)
  - MPP: Alexa Gilmour (Parkdale—High Park)
  - Councillor: Gord Perks (Ward 4 Parkdale—High Park)

High Park North, or often simply High Park, after the park, is a neighbourhood in Toronto, Ontario, Canada. It is bounded on the south by Bloor Street, on the west by Runnymede Road, on the north by Annette Street, and on the east by the GO Transit Weston Subdivision rail tracks (formerly owned by Canadian National Railway). It is located in the Parkdale—High Park provincial and federal electoral districts. The area east of Keele Street is also known informally as the "West Bend" neighbourhood.

== Character ==
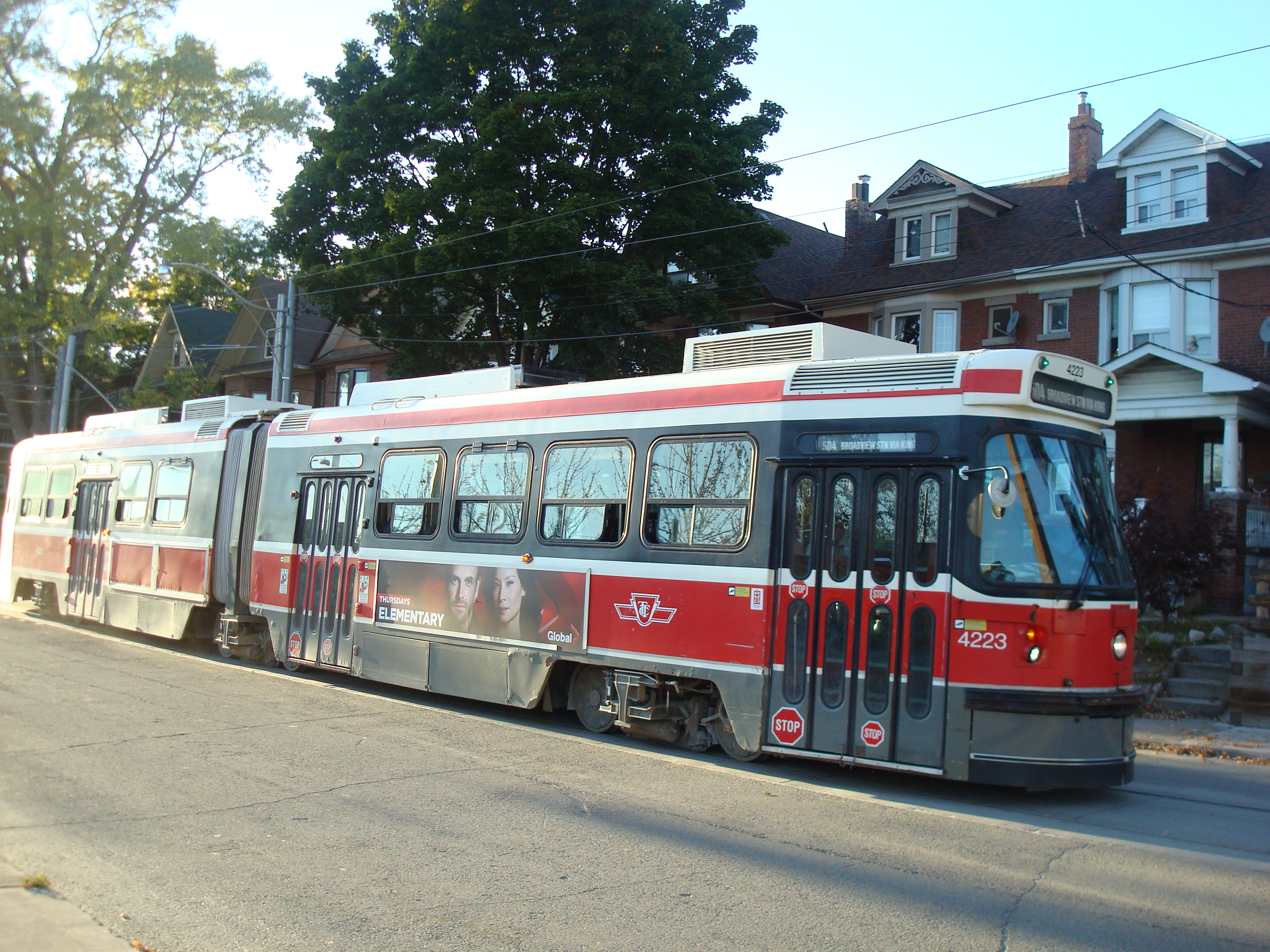
A TTC streetcar leaving Dundas West Station along Edna Avenue.

High Park North is mainly residential, containing many semi-detached homes built in the early 20th century. North of High Park, the neighbourhood has several high-rise apartment buildings, built after the construction of the Bloor-Danforth subway.

Bloor Street is the main east-west thoroughfare. It is a four-lane road and is mostly commercial with storefront-type businesses that have residential second and third storeys. North-south roads include Keele Street and Dundas Street. Both are primarily residential within the neighbourhood.

The oldest residential houses in High Park North were built in the late 1800s and early 1900s and are mostly Victorian, Edwardian and Tudor-style. The houses are typically two- and three-storey detached brick homes. Many homes have leaded and stained glass windows, wood trim, French doors, hardwood doors, and fireplaces.

Just north of the park is a district of high-rise apartment buildings, dating from the 1960s and 1970s. These are primarily located on Gothic, High Park, and Quebec Avenues.

== History ==
High Park North exists within the traditional territories of the Mississauga Anishinaabeg. The area however has also been home to Huron-Wendat and Haudenosaunee nations throughout history. High Park North exists on part of an old trading trail that led down toward the lake. This trail is the namesake for Indian Road, Indian Road Crescent, and Indian Grove.

High Park North falls entirely within the boundaries of the town of Toronto Junction, which was purchased from the Keele estate in 1882 by Daniel Clendenan who subdivided the farm and racetrack for a residential district (now called High Park North) to serve the Junction commercial district. As Bloor Street was still an uneven and a mostly undeveloped street, early housing in the area was concentrated to the north and east, where it was easier to access the stores and industry along Dundas Street. High Park Avenue in particular was the site of many early homes of the Junction wealthy, as was modern Evelyn Crescent; many of these houses are still standing. High Park North emerged as a neighbourhood once Bloor Street was widened and evened out following World War I, when most of the residential homes which still exist today were built.

=== 20th Century ===
In 1915, Bloor Street was the site of a major public works at the north-west corner of High Park. The street, west of High Park Avenue, was crossed by creeks that emptied into Grenadier Pond. The creek banks were steep, making the roadway treacherous and difficult for traffic. A rail trestle was built to cross the gap at a level of 60 feet. The rails were used for rail cars to dump soil around the trestle. The trestle was completely buried and the present Bloor Street roadway built on top. Existing north-south roadways connecting to Bloor Street were raised to meet the new level of Bloor Street and this facilitated the development of the neighbourhood. The first building in Canada designed by a Canadian trained female architect was constructed in the neighbourhood during this period. This landmark building by Jean Hall is a 1925 fourplex located at 63 Jerome Street.

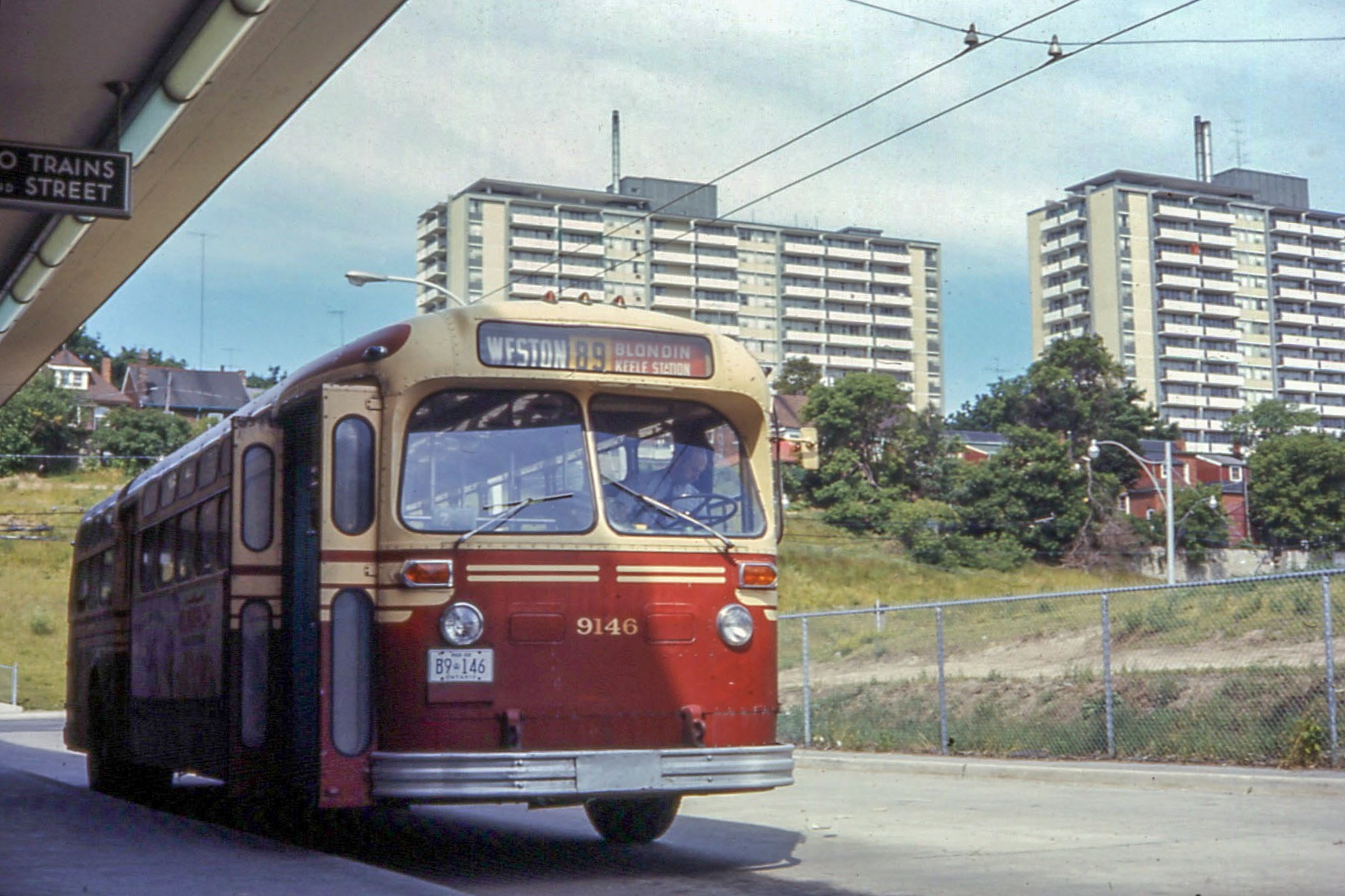
View of the area from Keele station, 1968. Concurrent with the arrival of the subway line in the 1960s, there were many residences razed in order to build apartment buildings.

In the 1960s, the area directly north of High Park was the site of 'block-busting' development. After the construction of the Bloor-Danforth subway line in the 1960s, the nearby residences on High Park Avenue, Quebec Avenue and Gothic Avenue were bought up by developers, razed and large apartment buildings were built. The area from north of the subway line to Glenlake Avenue is now almost entirely high-rise towers. At the time, the City government was very much pro-development, and there were no local ratepayer/community associations as is seen today. Local City alderman Ben Grys, along with his wife, owned properties on Gothic Avenue and voted to approve the apartment project on the site before his family's land holdings were revealed by John Sewell through a search of local property tax rolls. Under vague conflict-of-interest guidelines, Grys continued as alderman until he was defeated in the following municipal election. Grys sued Sewell over Sewell's attempt to remove him but eventually withdrew his case when it became clear that Sewell would get access to further information about his business dealings. By the 1970s, local residents formed associations in harmony with new reform Council members, partly to fight the block-busting north of High Park.

=== 21st Century ===
The desirability of living close to High Park and the subway keeps developers operating in the neighbourhood, although not on the scale of the past. In the first decade of the 2000s, a condominium development was built on the site of a former gas station on the south side of Bloor Street, overlooking High Park on the landfill of the former bridge over Wendigo Creek.

One block east of High Park Avenue, between Pacific and Oakmount, a block of Edwardian-era homes was purchased for demolition. The area is the site of a condominium development overlooking High Park. A tenant of one of the homes remained while the other homes became vacant and boarded up until eviction in 2010, much like the block-busting of the 1960s and 1970s. This is the first block of older homes directly on Bloor Street, facing High Park, to be demolished for apartment building.

== Demographics ==
The High Park neighbourhood has a population of 22162.

=== Generation Status ===
Between the years of 2006 and 2011, there were changes in the generation status of the population aged 15 years and older. In 2006, 62% of the total population were 1st generation, which is higher than that of 2011, which was 59%. The number of people who were 2nd or 3rd generation increased since 2006 in 2011. In 2006, 16% were 2nd generation, and 22% were 3rd generation. In 2011, 17% were 2nd generation and 24% were 3rd generation. The 2011 GNR was 32.6%.

== Education ==
The Toronto District School Board (TDSB) is an English secular public school board that serves the City of Toronto. The school board operates a number of institutions that provides primary and secondary education in the area including:

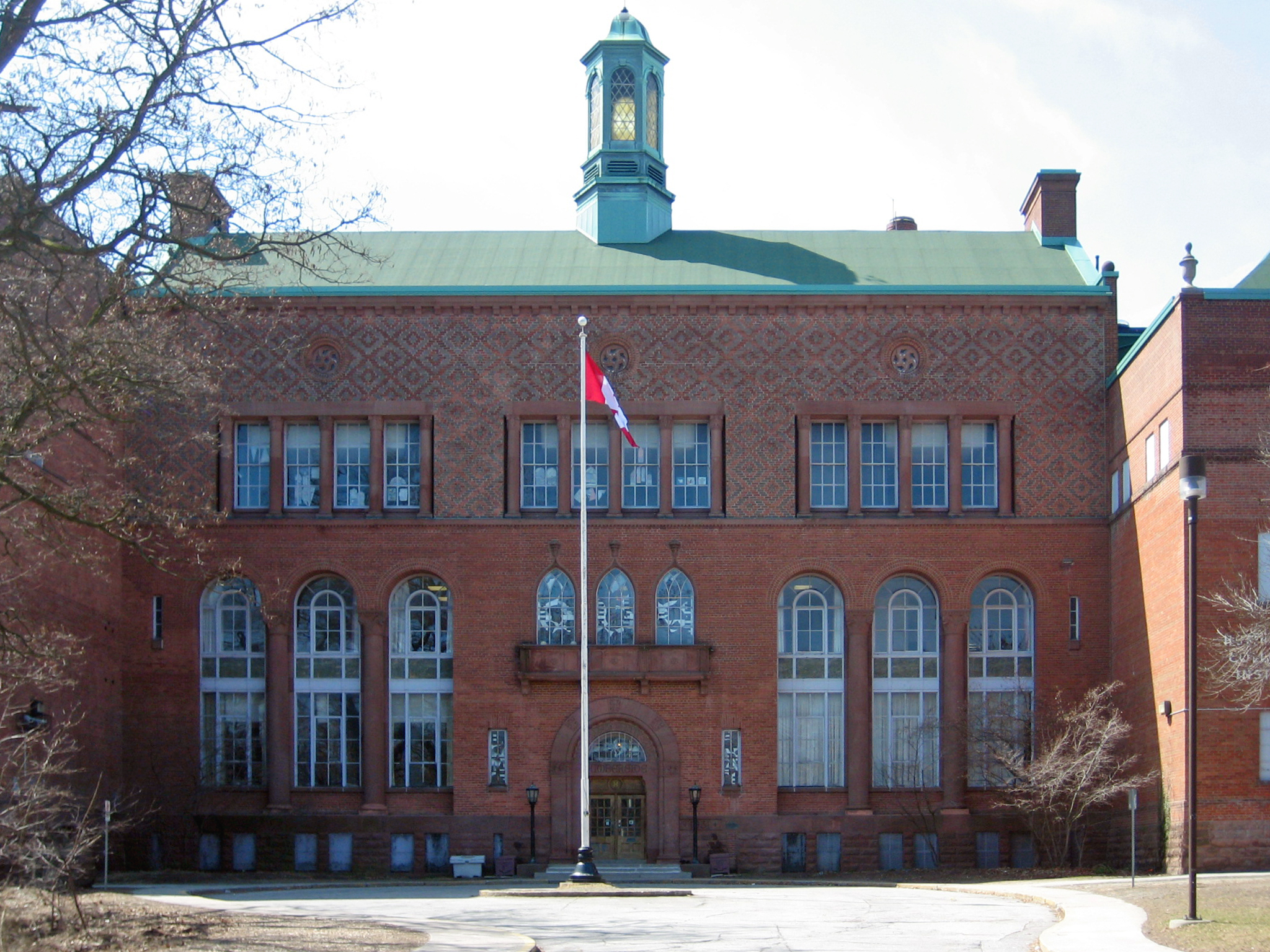
Humberside Collegiate Institute is a secular public secondary school operated by the Toronto District School Board.

- Annette Public School, an elementary school. It shares its space with High Park Alternate School.
- High Park Alternate School Jr, an elementary school that shares its space with Annette School on Annette Street.
- Indian Road Crescent Junior School, is located in the Junction Area of Toronto, east of Annette and Keele Streets. The original school, located to the north of the current building, was built in 1901. It was originally called Western Avenue Public School and was built on one of the transportation routes used by Indigenous peoples. The new school was built in 1964. Indian Road Crescent serves students from Junior Kindergarten to Grade 6. The school is also home to an Ontario Family Resource/Parenting Centre
- Keele Street Public School and Community Centre, an elementary school which shares its space with a community centre. It is located along the west side of Keele Street north of Bloor Street.
- Western Technical-Commercial School, a secondary school located on Evelyn Crescent north-west of High Park.
- Humberside Collegiate Institute, a secondary school located on Quebec Avenue at the intersection of Humberside Avenue.

The Toronto District Catholic School Board (TDCSB) is a public English separate school board that serves the City of Toronto. The school board operates a number of institutions that provides primary and secondary education in the area including:

- St. Cecilia School, an elementary school located on Annette Street. It offers a Junior Kindergarten to Grade 8 program.

St. Cecilia School was established by Father Joseph McCann, a priest at St. Helen's Church, who purchased land on Edwin Avenue in November 1887 to establish a new Catholic church and school. Originally the parish was to be named after St. Charles. According to historical records, however, the first school—a small wooden structure—was named St.Mary's. In 1890 the school was replaced with a brick building and renamed St.Cecilia's. Legend has it that St. Cecilia, the patron saint of sacred music, was chosen as the new name because the Heintzman Piano factory stood in view, across the railway tracks, from the school. The present St. Cecilia's Church, at the corner of Annette Street and Pacific Avenue, was opened in 1909, replacing a smaller structure first occupied in 1895. Father Eugene Gallagher was the pastor.

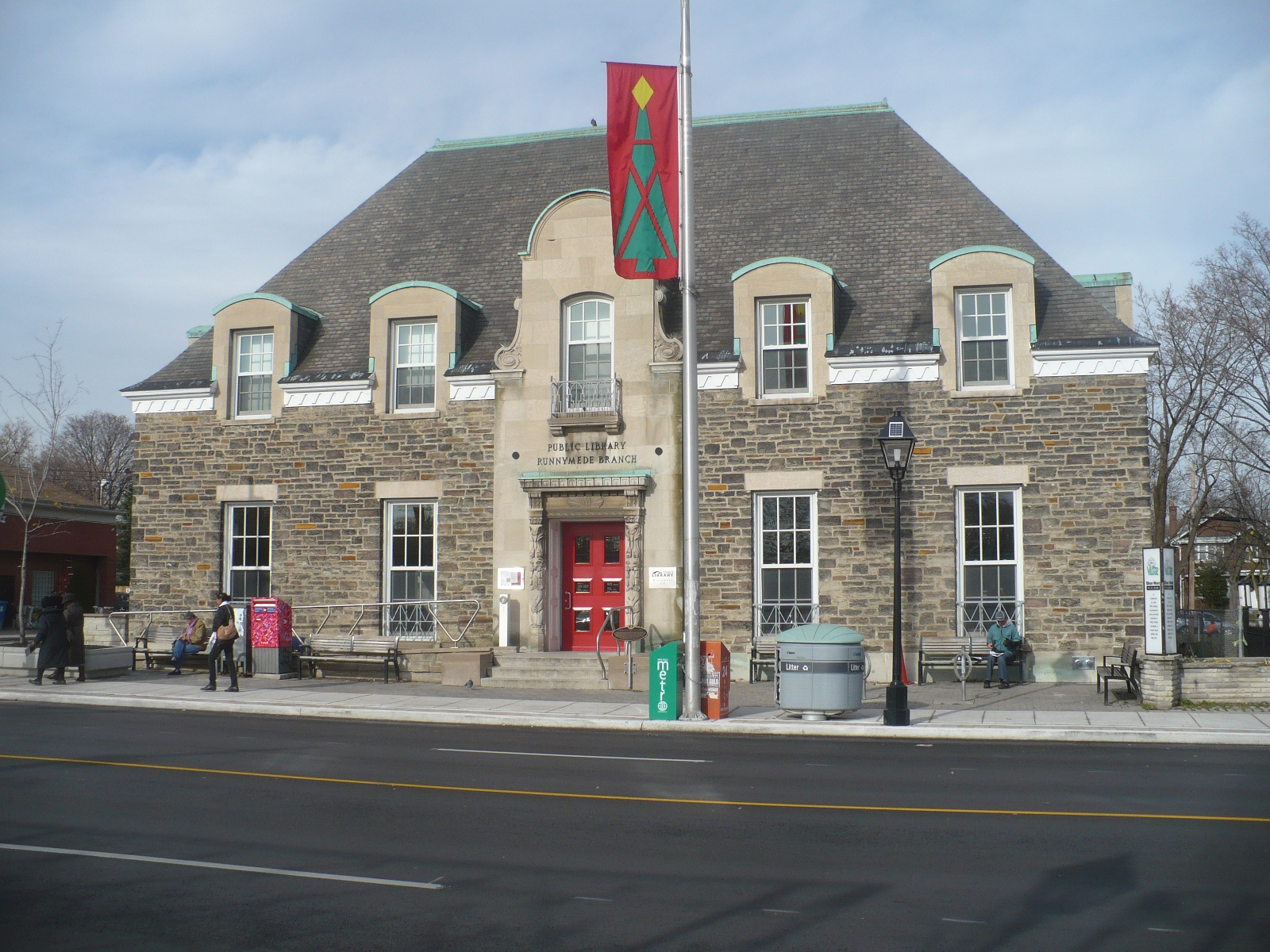
View of Runnymede branch of the Toronto Public Library, located in the southwest edge of High Park North.

The present St. Cecilia Catholic School at the corner of Annette Street and Evelyn Avenue opened in 1914 with additions in 1918, 1954 and 1964. The school's first teachers and administrators were the Loretto Nuns, who lived in the former Heintzman family residence at Annette and Laws Streets, providing another musical connection with St. Cecilia.

=== Toronto Public Library ===
The Runnymede Branch of the Toronto Public Library, housed in a renovated heritage building built in 1930, is located within High Park North at Bloor Street West and Glendonwynne Road. The Annette branch of the TPL is located to the northeast of the neighbourhood at Annette and Medland.

== Transportation ==
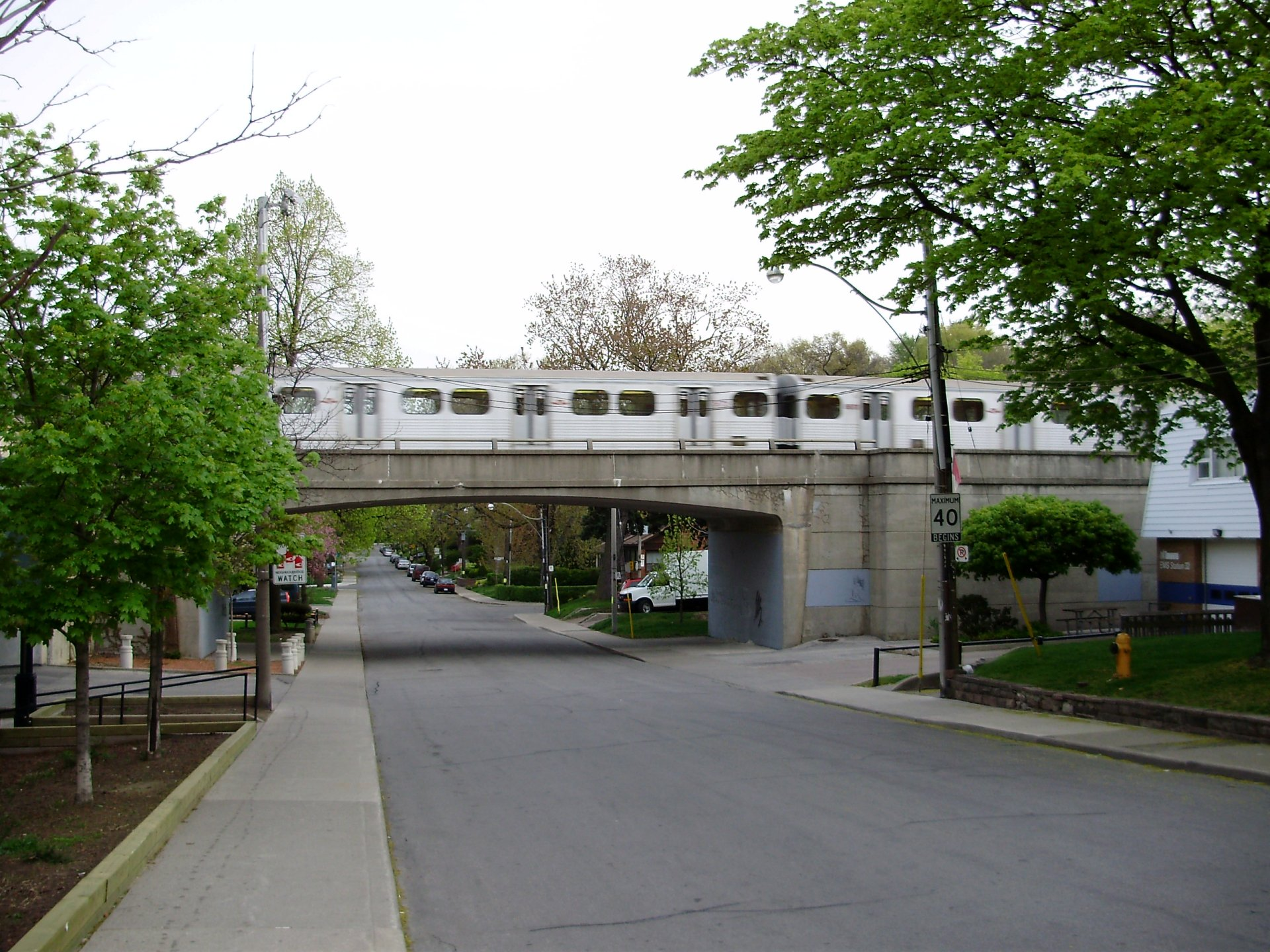
High Park North is served by three subway stations of the TTC's Bloor-Danforth line.

The neighbourhood is served by the Dundas West, Keele and High Park stations of the Bloor-Danforth TTC subway line. The TTC operates local buses out of each station.

== See also ==
- List of neighbourhoods in Toronto
