= Runnymede station =

Toronto subway station

Runnymede
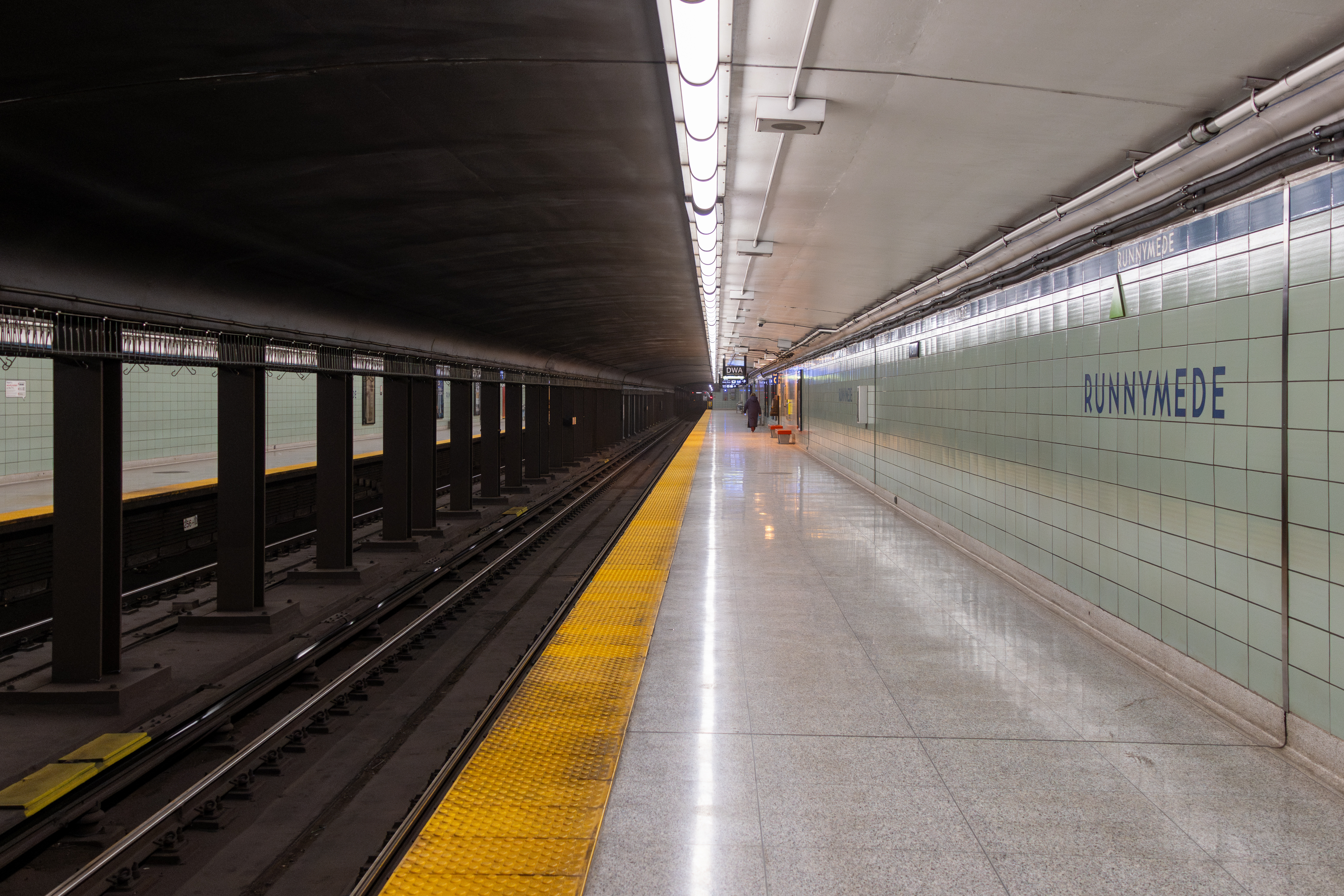

General information
- Location: 265 Runnymede Road; Toronto, Ontario; Canada
- Coordinates: 43°39′06″N 79°28′34″W
- Platforms: Side platforms
- Tracks: 2
- Connections: TTC buses: 71 Runnymede; 77 Swansea; 79 Scarlett Rd; 300 Bloor - Danforth

Construction
- Structure type: Underground
- Accessible: Yes

Other information
- Website: Official station page

History
- Opened: May 10, 1968; 58 years ago

Passengers
- 2023–2024: 15,838
- Rank: 48 of 70

Services
Preceding station	Toronto Transit Commission	Following station
Jane towards Kipling	Line 2 Bloor–Danforth	High Park towards Kennedy
Location

Runnymede is a subway station on Line 2 Bloor–Danforth of the Toronto subway in Toronto, Ontario, Canada. It is located just north of Bloor Street West, spanning the block east of Runnymede Road to Kennedy Avenue, with bus platforms at the surface level and entrances at both ends.

== History ==
The station opened in 1968 as part of the westerly extension of the subway line from Keele to Islington station.

Extensive rehabilitation of the concrete station structure was undertaken in 2010. This work involved replacing the concrete slab and columns of the bus platform, and the bus driveway structural paving.

Installation of three elevators to make the station fully accessible commenced in late November 2018. The construction took two years to complete.

== Description ==
The station has two entrances, one on Runnymede Road and the other at Kennedy Avenue. The station is barrier free from the street to the bus platforms. The bus platforms are not in a fare-paid area. The station has three levels: street, concourse and platform.

Runnymede station features public art by artist Elicser Elliott titled Anonymous Somebody. The artwork consists of images of people that one may see in Bloor West Village, the neighbourhood where the station is located.

== Subway infrastructure in the vicinity ==
The line is tunneled westward toward Jane station. About halfway east towards High Park station, just after at Kennedy Park Road, the line comes to the surface at the Clendenan Portal and crosses over Clendenan Avenue.

== Nearby landmarks ==
Nearby landmarks include the former Runnymede Theatre, the Runnymede branch of the Toronto Public Library, Runnymede Junior & Senior Public School, Western Technical-Commercial School, and Runnymede United Church.

== Surface connections ==
The station's bus platform is not within the fare-paid area.

TTC routes serving the station include:

Bay	Route	Name	Additional information
1	Spare		
2	71	Runnymede	Northbound to Industry Street via Mount Dennis station
3	79A	Scarlett Road	Northbound to Lawrence Avenue West and Jane Street via Pritchard Avenue/Foxwell Street
3	79B	Scarlett Road	Northbound to Lawrence Avenue West and Jane Street via St. Clair Avenue West
4	77	Swansea	Southbound to the Queensway

== Gallery ==
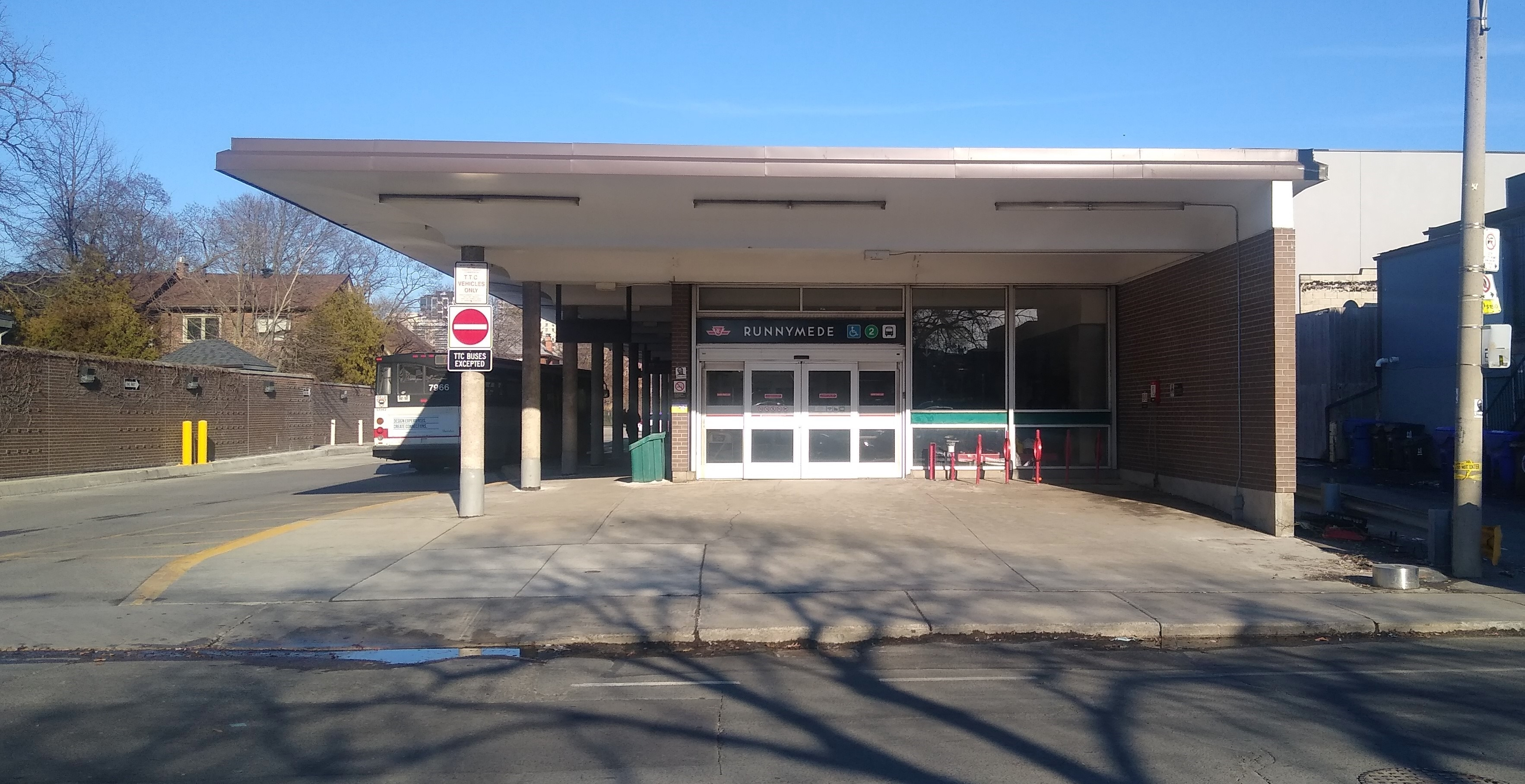
West side entrance to the station from Runnymede Road

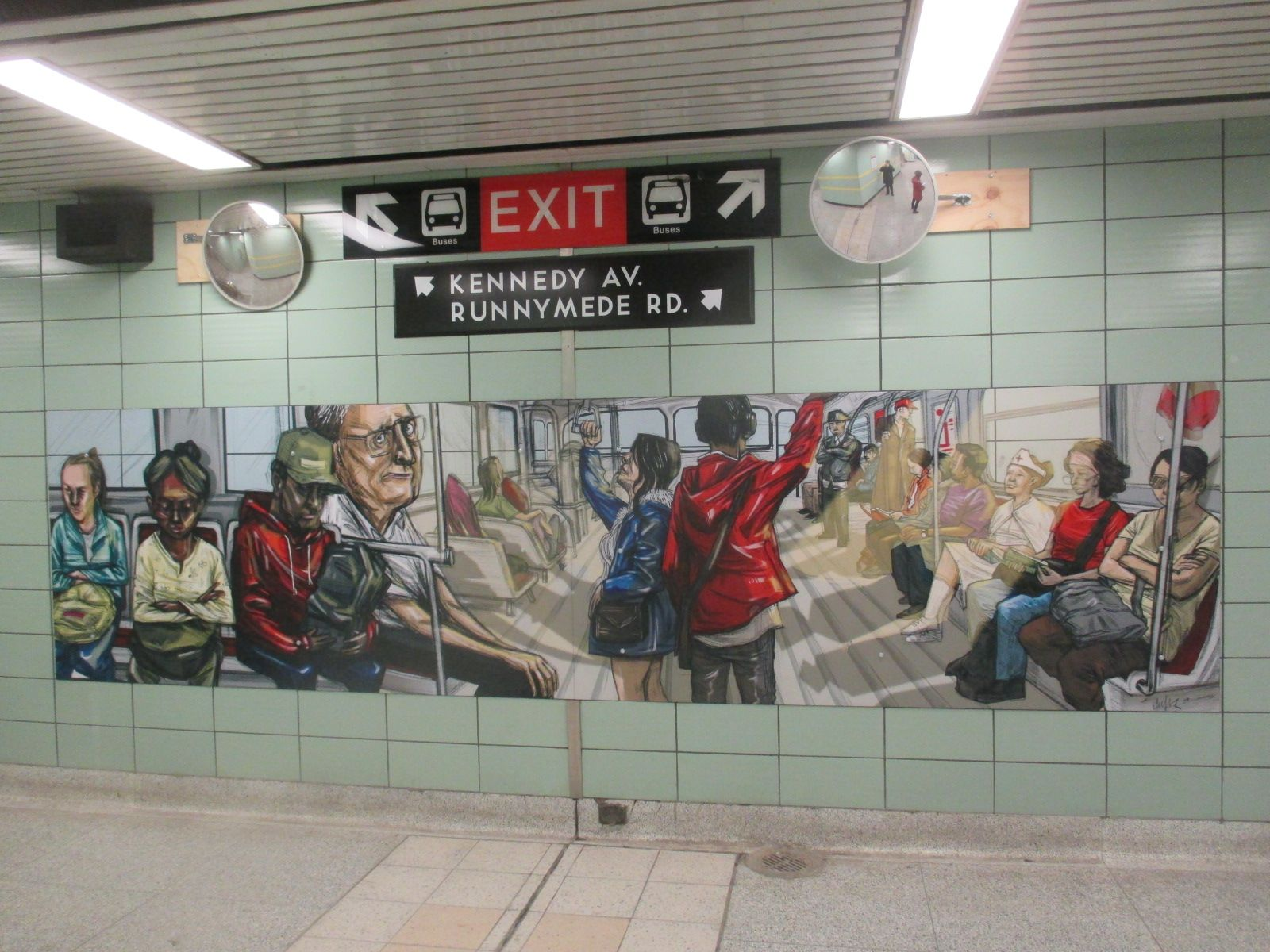
Artwork Anonymous Somebody
