= John Scarlett (Toronto) =

English-Canadian merchant (1777–1865)

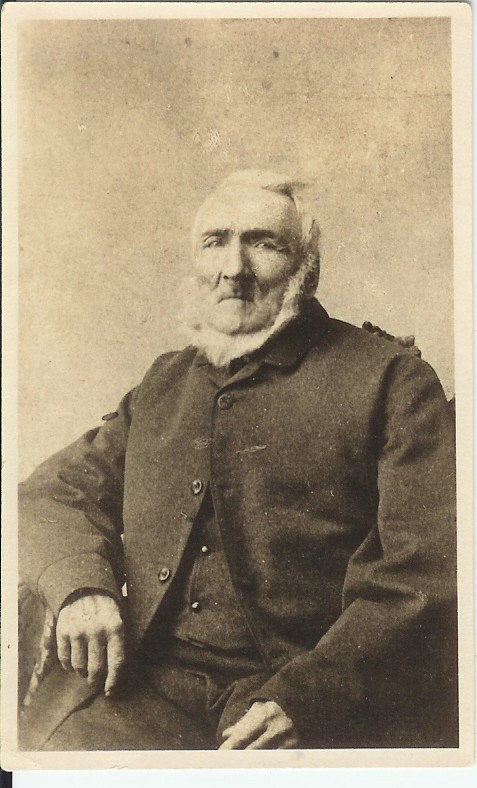
- Born: July 30, 1777; Newcastle-under-Lyme, England
- Died: July 31, 1865; Toronto, Ontario, Canada
- Occupation: Merchant-Miller

John Scarlett (1777–1865) was a merchant-miller who played a significant role in the development of the part of the historic York Township that later became the Junction neighbourhood of Toronto, Ontario.

== Early life ==
John Scarlett was born July 30, 1777, in Newcastle-under-Lyme, Staffordshire, England, the second of eleven children to Samuel Scarlett and Mary Bowker. His father was an upholder and agent to the Phoenix Fire Insurance Office and was presumably a man of considerable wealth. Beginning at age 15 John Scarlett apprenticed to his father for seven years as a mercer, draper and upholsterer.

== Arrival in York ==
In 1809, at the age of 32, John Scarlett arrived in York (now Toronto) from Antigua and quickly established himself in York society. He was described by his contemporaries as handsome, intelligent and well connected. In 1809 he started work as chief clerk in the inspector general's office in York, a position he held for 20 years. The same year he started acquiring property along the Humber River. In 1810 he married Mary Thompson, a United Empire Loyalist and close friend of Elizabeth Russell sister of the late Peter Russell who had been Administrator of Upper Canada.

Upon his arrival in York he was in possession of a male slave whom he had bought in Antigua for £144. While slavery did persist in Upper Canada into the 1830s, by 1809 the abolition movement was well underway. In 1793 the Upper Canada legislature had passed the Act Against Slavery which among other things outlawed the importation of slaves and, in 1807, Britain had enacted the Slave Trade Act which abolished the slave trade in the British Empire. Scarlett's first house in the area was a large structure of hewn logs near the river but it was destroyed in a fire. He then lived about six miles west of York at Simcoe Grange, a house that stood near what is now the intersection of Keele Street and Dundas Street.

== Property and Business Interests ==
John Scarlett is most notable as a land owner and entrepreneur who made a significant contribution to the early economy of Toronto and York Township. He began acquiring property in York Township shortly after his arrival beginning in 1809 when he purchased 33 acres along the Humber River from Thomas Cooper including a mill site. He then applied for a lease of Clergy reserve lands in 1810, leasing and eventually purchasing 400 acres. His wife also owned 200 acres which she had been granted for being a United Empire Loyalist. Scarlett later bought all the land fronting on both sides of Dundas Street from its junction with the Weston Plank Road to what is now Jane Street, a total of 644 acres.

By 1815 Scarlett owned over 1000 acres in the area west of Keele Street and north of Dundas Street. In 1820 he purchased a road built by Michael Miller some 15 years earlier which led from just south of the Village of Weston south to Dundas Street. This was rechristened Scarlett Road, a name it bears to this day.

Scarlett's mill complexes on the Humber river were at the heart of his business enterprises. Mills, particularly lumber and grist, were essential to the economy of Upper Canada. One of the first priorities of Lt. Governor Simcoe upon his arrival in York was to find suitable mill sites and get a mill operating. By 1793 a crown owned lumber mill was up and running on the Humber River and a privately run grist mill was operating by 1797. Though surveyors were supposed to reserve mill sites for the crown in practice over 60 years almost all of them were privately owned on operated.

By 1815 Scarlett had a lumber and a grist mill on the east bank of the Humber River and a saw mill on the west. Like other mill owners along the Humber River such as Thomas Fisher and William Gamble, Scarlett was not simply a miller who took money or a cut of produce for sawing wood or grinding grain, rather he ran a mill complex which operated as a general store, commercial hub and a grain exchange. Scarlett would buy customers' grain or lumber or exchange it for other goods and then transport it into town, a task which was difficult for a typical producer. In town the grain or lumber could be sold on the domestic market, exported or stored until prices were more favourable. Mill complexes such as Scarlett's attracted an assortment of tradesmen including coopers, blacksmiths, tanners etc. A mill complex almost invariably included a stable and inn. Scarlett's also included a distillery.

Mr. Scarlett may, indeed be regarded as the father of Toronto Junction; he built almost, if not the very first house in the locality. He was for a long time (excepting the farmers) the only employer of labour in the neighbourhood, he having extensive brick yards on Dundas street, near the Plank road, and was besides the first owner of nearly all the land in the vicinity.

— John Ross Robertson, Landmarks of Toronto Vol. 2 pg. 735

Scarlett was one of the incorporators of the Bank of Upper Canada. He had a lumber yard in the town of York which he later converted to a steam powered sawing and planing mill. He also maintained and collected tolls on Scarlett Road and Runnymede Road which lead north to his home. In spite of his apprenticeship in the textile business he never owed a textile mill.

By 1828 Scarlett's many business interests were taking enough of his time that he resigned from his position at the inspector generals office. In 1833 he turned down a commission as Justice of the Peace due to business commitments. In 1836 he pulled his eldest son Edward Christopher form his studies at Upper Canada College to teach him how to run a mill. In 1836-1837 he, Edward Christopher and son John Archibald took a trip to the United States midwest to study milling equipment.

In 1846 Scarlett sold his mills to William Pearce Howland, a move which proved to be well timed. Changes in colonial trade laws, the decline of timber resources in the Humber Valley and continued destruction from flooding spelled an end to the prosperity of millers shortly thereafter. Howland closed the mills in 1848. After his retirement Scarlett's four sons continued to run many of the enterprises he had established with mixed success.

== Family life ==
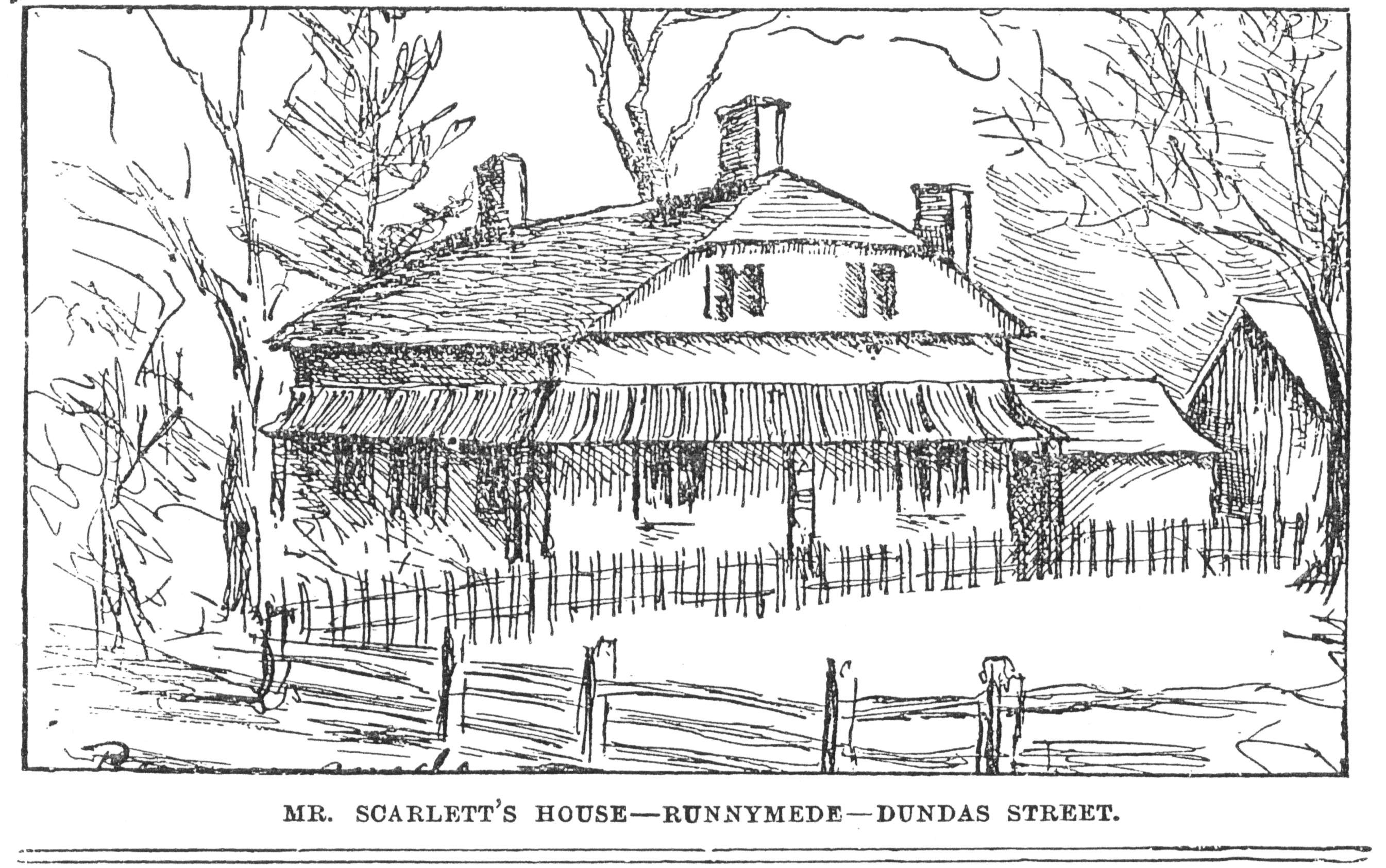
Runnymede, built 1838

On July 5, 1810, John Scarlett married Mary Thomson at St James' Church in York. Together they had six children before Mary's death on August 20, 1827: Edward Christopher in 1811, Mary in 1815, John Archibald in 1819, St. George in 1820, Elizabeth Maria in 1823 and Samuel in 1826.

In 1816 John Scarlett had asked for and received a lot in town at the corner of Hospital St. (now Richmond) and Peter St; however, he did not build a house in town right away. York assessment rolls for 1834 list only a lot in town with no buildings or other property.

About two and a half years after the death of his first wife Scarlett married Elizabeth Dennison on January 11, 1830. In 1837, at the age of 14 his daughter Elizabeth died.

The following year the Scarlett family moved from Simcoe Grange to a new larger house at what is now the north side of the intersection of Dundas Street and Runnymede Rd. Scarlett named this new rough-cast wooden home Runnymede. Later, in the 1880s, as the area was subdivided and developed the name Runnymede started to be used for local schools, churches, a hospital, theater etc.

Samuel Scarlett returned to live at Simcoe Grange in 1847 the same year John Scarlett's second wife died. In July 1849 he married his third wife, Sophia Porteous.

After 1854 Scarlett spent most of his time in town, by then renamed Toronto, where he died July 31, 1865. He lies buried at St James' Cemetery, Toronto. By the time of his death Scarlett had 17 grandchildren.

Scarlett was described as dynamic and well-read. At the same time he was capable of deep affection and had very kind heart under his somewhat rough manner. At home he was adored and even something of a wag.

== Simcoe Chase Course ==
In the first part of the 19th century Toronto Island was the favoured place for horse races around York but the bridge to the island was washed out as often as not and many of the best horses were owned by officers at Fort York so in 1835 a race course was laid out on the Garrison Common. A few years later however that land was subdivided and sold. At this point, John Scarlett established the Simcoe Chase Course on a flat section of his property near the present boundary of Lambton Golf Course north of St. Clair Avenue.

Scarlett loved horses and was a hard rider even up to an advanced age but never owned a racehorse and probably never placed a bet. The course on his property was managed by the City of Toronto and Home District Turf Club and was in operation until 1842 at which point Toronto had more accessible race courses.
