= Runnymede Road =

Road in Toronto, Canada

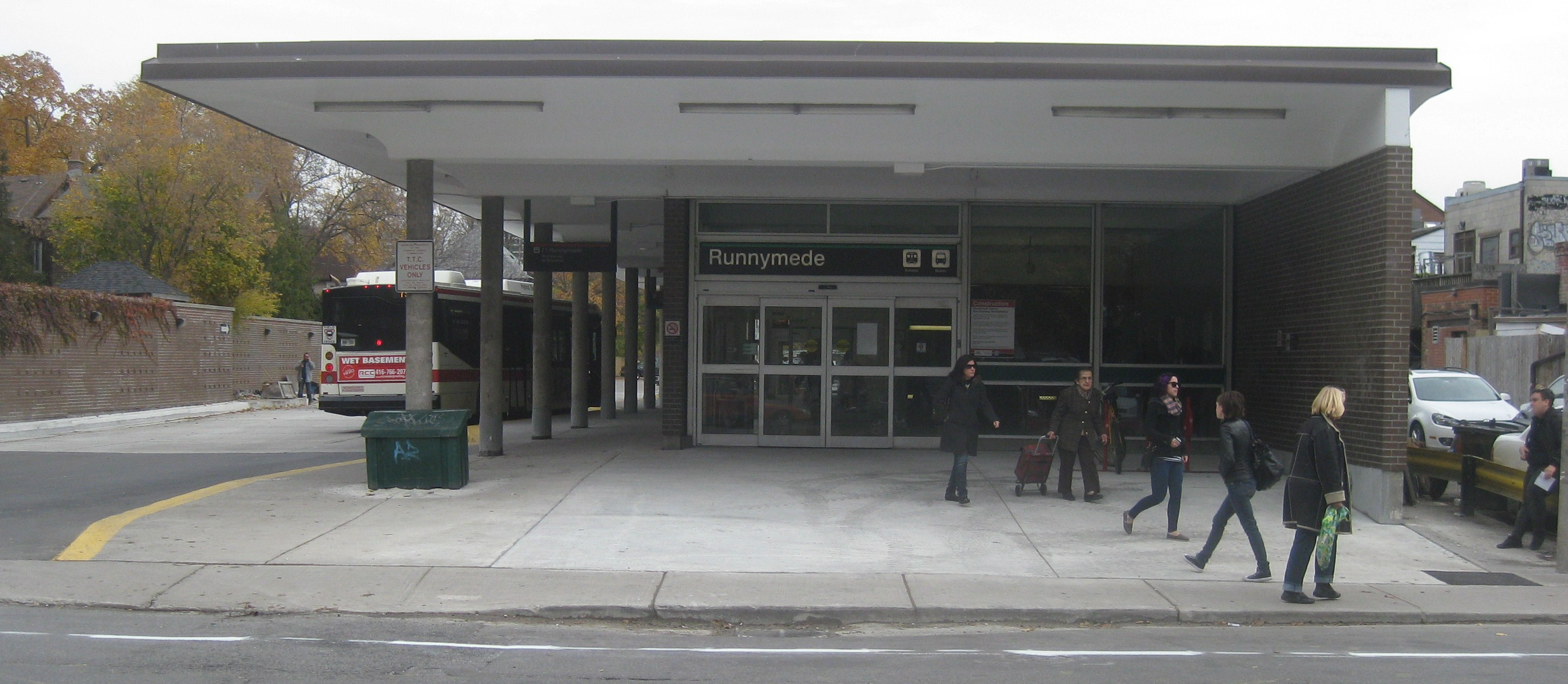

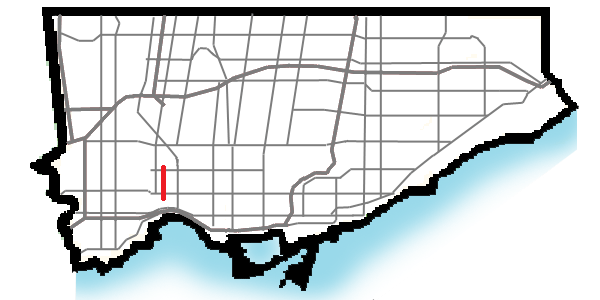
- Top: Runnymede Station (2022); Bottom: Map of Runnymede in Toronto
- Maintained by: City of Toronto
- Length: 2.88 km (1.79 mi)
- North end: Henrietta Street
- South end: Morningside Avenue

Runnymede Road is a street in the west end of Toronto, Ontario, Canada. It runs from Morningside Avenue at its south end (west of High Park) and ends at Henrietta Street, just north of St. Clair Ave. There is a small section continuing but ends in a Cul de sac. At its southern end, it begins as a narrow 2 lane road. It heads north to Bloor Street, where it widens to accommodate bikes lanes. At St. Clair, the bikes lanes stop, and it becomes a 2-way street north until Henrietta.

John Scarlett, a mill and distillery owner along the Humber River, laid out what is now Runnymede Road in 1817.

Despite its name, Runnymede Collegiate Institute is actually on Jane Street, although it is located in the Runnymede neighbourhood. Runnymede Park is located one block east of Runnymede Road, north of its intersection with the Canadian Pacific Railway line.

The Toronto Civic Railways Bloor West streetcar route was not extended to Runnymede until 1917, because a large ravine near present-day Glendonwynne road. This streetcar would later be replaced by a subway.

At Bloor Street, TTC's Bloor-Danforth line 2 intersects creating Runnymede station. The 71 Runnymede and 79 Scarlett Road bus routes run north on Runnymede from Runnymede Station, both serving from Bloor to Henrietta. The 77 Swansea serves south of the station to Morningside.

According to Tony Ruprecht's history of Toronto's ethnic communities, Toronto's Many Faces, Dundas Street between Runnymede and Keele is the heart of the Maltese diaspora.

HMCS Runnymede, a World War II Royal Canadian Navy vessel, was named after the Runnymede neighbourhood.

== See also ==
- Scarlett Road
