= Bloor West Village =

Coordinates: 43°39′03″N 79°28′39″W

Bloor West Village Bloor Zachód Wioska (Polish) Район Блюр-Вест (Ukrainian)
- Residential Neighbourhood and Shopping District
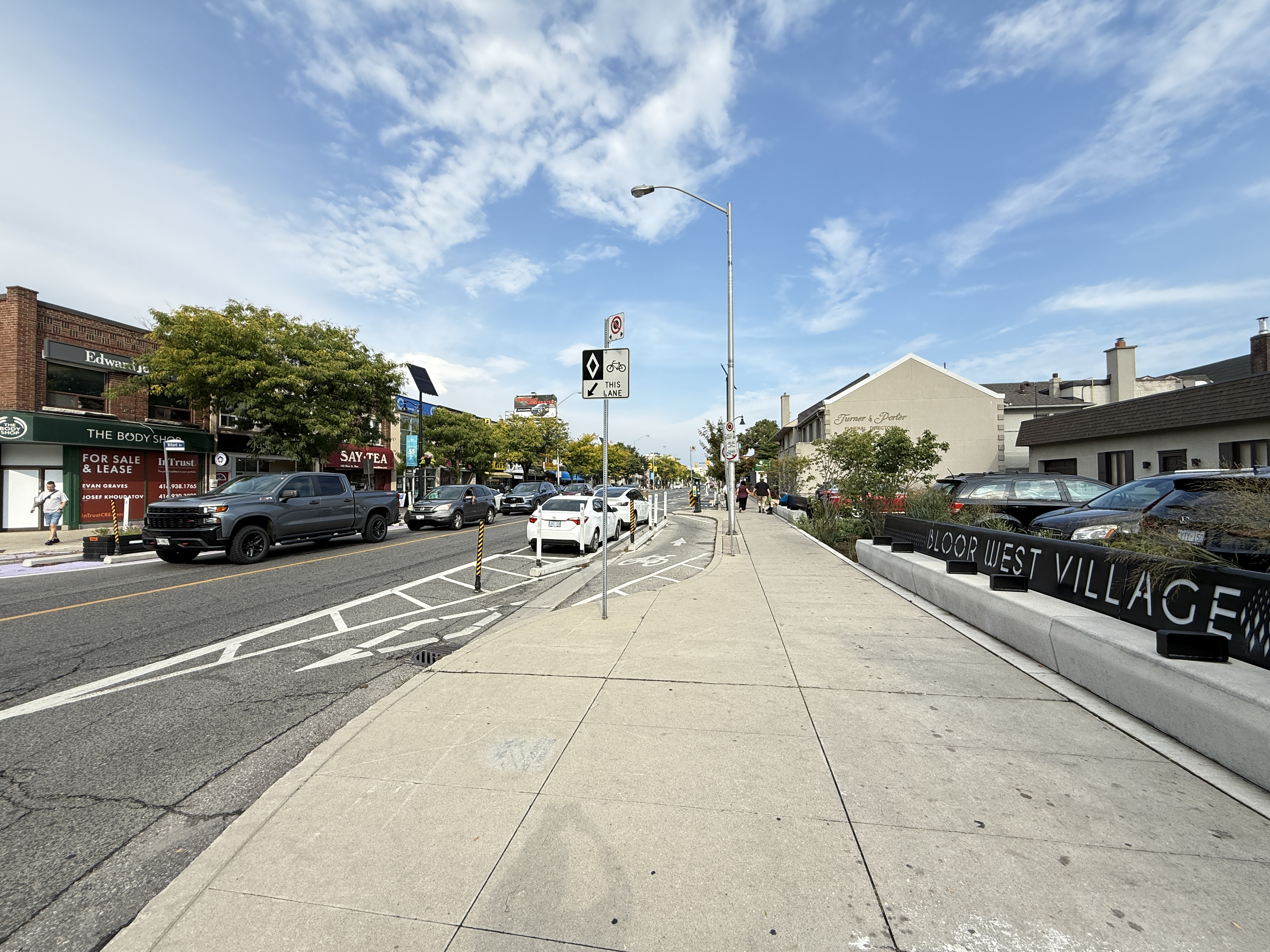
- Bloor West Village at Willard Avenue (2025)

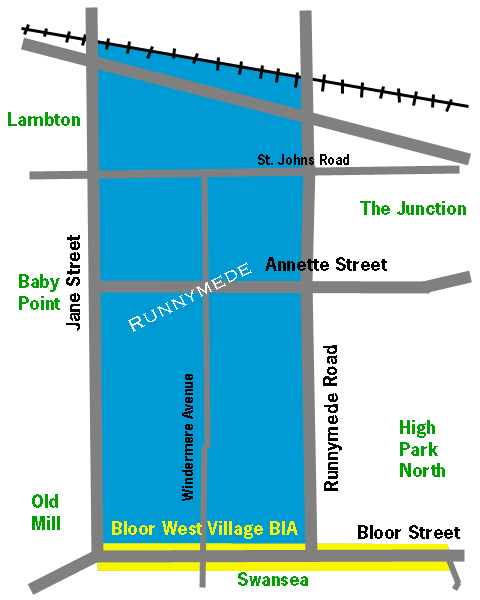
- Runnymede neighbourhood and Bloor West Village BIA
- Country: Canada
- Province: Ontario
- City: Toronto
- Community - City -: Toronto

Bloor West Village is a residential neighbourhood and shopping district in Toronto, Ontario, Canada. Bordered on the south by Bloor Street, it encompasses all businesses along Bloor Street between South Kingsway and Ellis Park Road, consisting of more than 400 shops, restaurants and services, plus the residential neighbourhood to the north. The official City of Toronto name of the neighbourhood is Runnymede-Bloor West Village.

Runneymede-Bloor West Village is bordered by High Park-Swansea to the south, Lambton-Baby Point to the west, Rockcliffe-Smythe to the north, and High Park North to the east.

Along the Bloor high street, the mix of stores include specialty clothing stores, book stores, restaurants and cafes. The businesses organized in 1970 into the first mandatory business improvement district, an idea that has spread to numerous other commercial streets in Toronto and internationally.

== History ==
Runnymede-Bloor West Village is also considered the name of the immediate vicinity of Bloor Street.

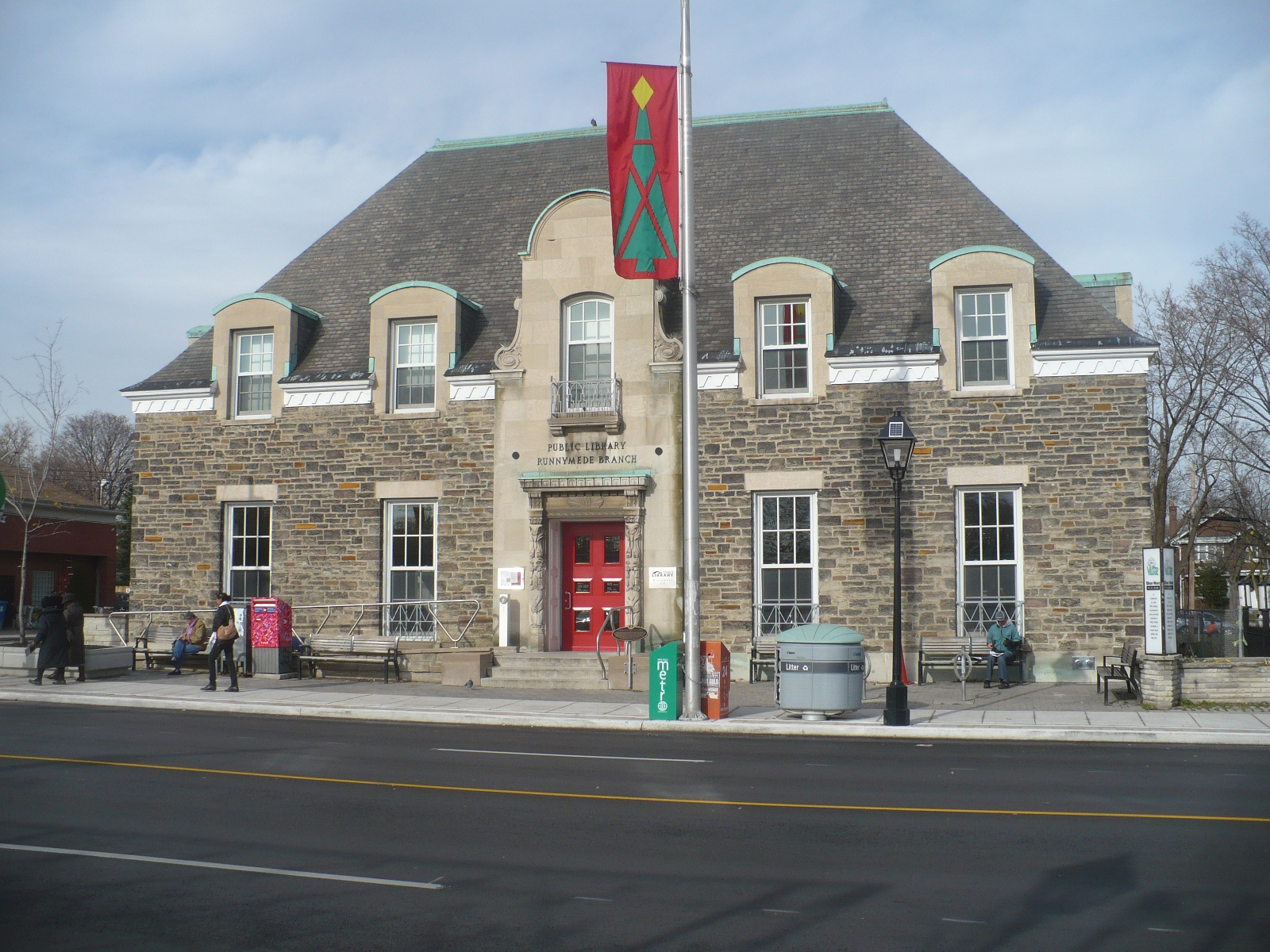
Runnymede Public Library was opened in Bloor West Village in 1930, serving the neighbourhoods around the Village.

On February 25, 1966, the Bloor–Danforth subway line opened in the area, allowing shoppers to shop downtown instead of the businesses along Bloor Street. Competition was also developing from enclosed shopping centres. Businessmen of the district attempted to set up a business association to pay for improvements to the area, but received only partial support from businesses in the area, and not enough to pay the estimated expenses to renovate and market the area. The businessmen lobbied the Toronto and Ontario governments for legislation to compel all business owners within a designated area to pay towards improvements, as directed by an elected body.

The Ontario Municipal Act was amended in 1970 and the Bloor West Village Business Improvement Association (BIA) was founded as the first of its kind in the world, first chaired by Alex Ling.

In 1980, Ling founded the Toronto Association of Business Improvement Areas (TABIA), an organization that now represents 66 BIAs across Toronto. Ling was chairman of the Bloor West Village BIA for 24 years. The organization promotes business activity in the area by holding several annual events and festivals. It also puts efforts into the beautification of the area.

The BIA hosts:

- Annual Ukrainian Festival in September (music, foods and crafts).
- July Festival, which is a local fair of amusements and entertainment.
- Halloween Festival on Armadale Avenue, Beresford Avenue and Glendonwynne Road (family-friendly activities).
- Participates in the Toronto citywide "Cavalcade of Lights" (December)

In Fall 2017, the City of Toronto started a study to designate Bloor West Village as a Heritage Conservation District. The city explained that the neighbourhood has an established main street that was developed in early to mid-20th century, and it has been historically demarcating road, dividing distinct communities such as Swansea, West Toronto, Brockton Village prior to amalgamation. It also reflects past communities and broader city developments, such as opening of Bloor streetcar line in the 1920s and opening of Bloor-Danforth subway line in the 1960s.
