= Brockton High School (Toronto) =

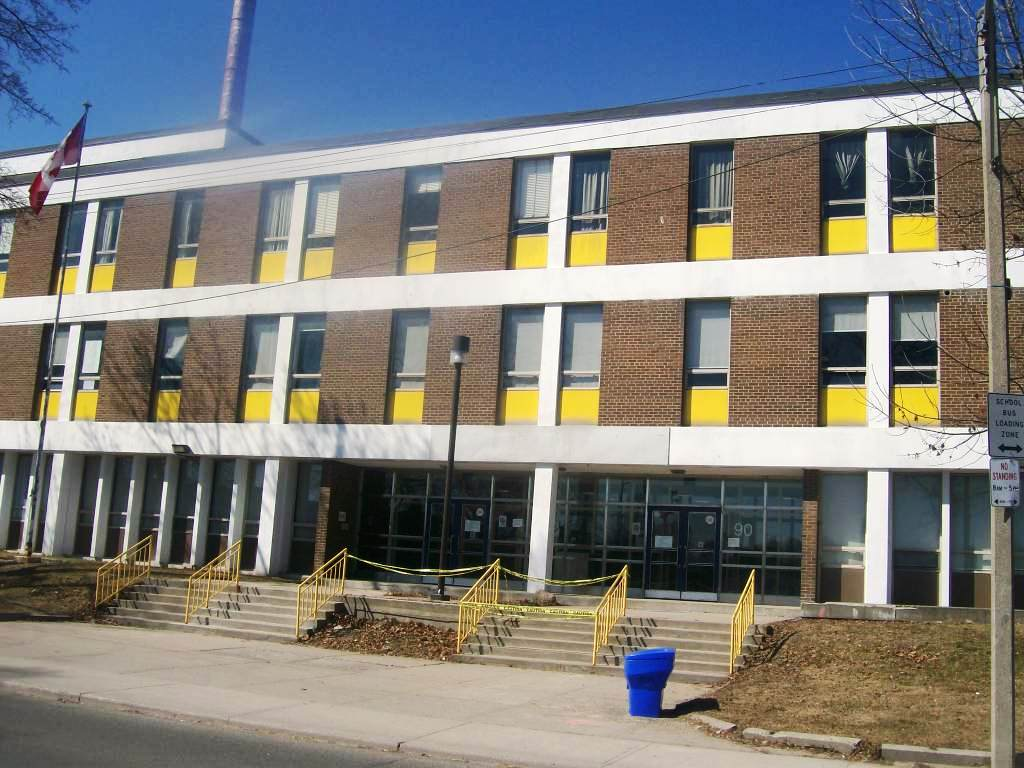

Location
- 90 Croatia Street; Toronto, Ontario, M6H 1K9; Canada; 43.658129°N 79.437958°W

Information
- School type: Public High School; Vocational High School
- Founded: 1966
- Status: Demolished
- Closed: 1995
- School board: Toronto District School Board (Toronto Board of Education)
- Oversight: Toronto Lands Corporation
- Superintendent: Curtis Ennis
- Area trustee: Maria Rodrigues
- School number: 896519
- Grades: 9-13
- Enrollment: 990
- Language: English
- Schedule type: Semestered
- Team name: Brockton Rams
- Public transit access: TTC: North/South: 29 Dufferin; Rapid Transit: Dufferin

Brockton High School (also known as Brockton HS, BHS, or simply known as Brockton) was a Toronto District School Board learning complex based in the Brockton Village neighbourhood of Toronto, Ontario, Canada that once operated as Brockton Learning Centre consisting of the Aboriginal Education Centre and the Caring and Safe Schools Brockton program. It was formerly a public and vocational high school operated from 1967 to 1995 by the Toronto Board of Education. The Brockton property, located near Dufferin Mall, is still owned by the Toronto District School Board, and the lot was transformed into the new Bloor Collegiate Institute building. The demolished school site was known for an art installation known as Bloordale Beach during the early days of the COVID-19 pandemic in Toronto.

== History ==
Brockton High School opened its doors to the community in 1966, as a vocational school.

In 1986, the Toronto Board of Education announced that it planned to close the West Park Secondary School facility by 1988 with the latter campus being given to the Metropolitan Separate School Board (now the Toronto Catholic District School Board). A task force recommended that the student body be transferred to Brockton High School. That year, the Toronto Star wrote that West Park students were expected to be transferred to Brockton. The school received students from West Park.

In 1989 Sandro Contenta of the Toronto Star wrote that students at Brockton told him that if a store in Dufferin Mall is robbed, police go to Brockton to find suspects but that students at Bloor Collegiate Institute are not suspected. In 1991, Andrew Duffy of the Toronto Star wrote that, according to area residents, drug dealers sold drugs in the area around the school. By September 1992, an area mall began housing an area which served as the location of the re-entry program for older students at Brockton and the West Toronto Secondary School's satellite campus for the cooperative education program.

On the afternoon of Wednesday, September 30, 1992 two gang attacks, involving male students traveling alone being beaten and stabbed, occurred. Afterwards many students discussed the incident. Jim Rankin of the Toronto Star wrote that most students blamed "racist gangs" for causing issues at the school. One gang cited by students was the Latin Americans or LAs.

. On Thursday October 20, 1994, a guidance counselor and an assistant principal were shot in their offices. They received chest, leg, and shoulder wounds but remained alive. A 27-year-old student was charged with attempted murder.

== Closure and aftermath ==
By June 1995, the school was scheduled to close due to declining enrollment. Brockton was scheduled to close in the fall of 1995, with the campus converted into Ursula Franklin Academy, an academic school. Ursula Franklin Academy was scheduled to move into a new campus by September 2002.

Brockton served as the TDSB's Aboriginal Education Centre and the Caring and Safe Schools Brockton programs, and was leased out to several tenants. By July 2007, the Royal Conservatory of Music's bookstore temporarily moved into the former Brockton building as the site had renovations. In October 2006, FoodShare, a non-profit community food security organization founded in 1985, also moved into the building, sharing space with the conservatory. At one point, the Conseil scolaire Viamonde leased Brockton to house its students from the overcrowded Le Collège français until it bought West Toronto Collegiate Institute in 2011. In 2025, a new secondary school was built on the Brockton site, to accommodate students from Bloor Collegiate Institute and Alpha Alternative School. The building itself was demolished in July 2019 with the new Bloor Collegiate building being completed in summer 2025.

Construction fencing surrounding the site was left in place after demolition of the school was completed, preventing neighbourhood access to a public right-of-way that had been in use on the site for many decades. In the early months of 2020, neighbourhood residents removed parts of the fencing to restore public access to this walkway. On May 25, 2020, amidst the first wave of the COVID-19 pandemic in Toronto, "Bloordale Beach" signs appeared at the entrances, and the site was used as an impromptu beach from May 25, 2020 until September 23, 2021.

== See also ==
- List of high schools in Ontario
