= Brockton Village =

Brockton
- Neighbourhood
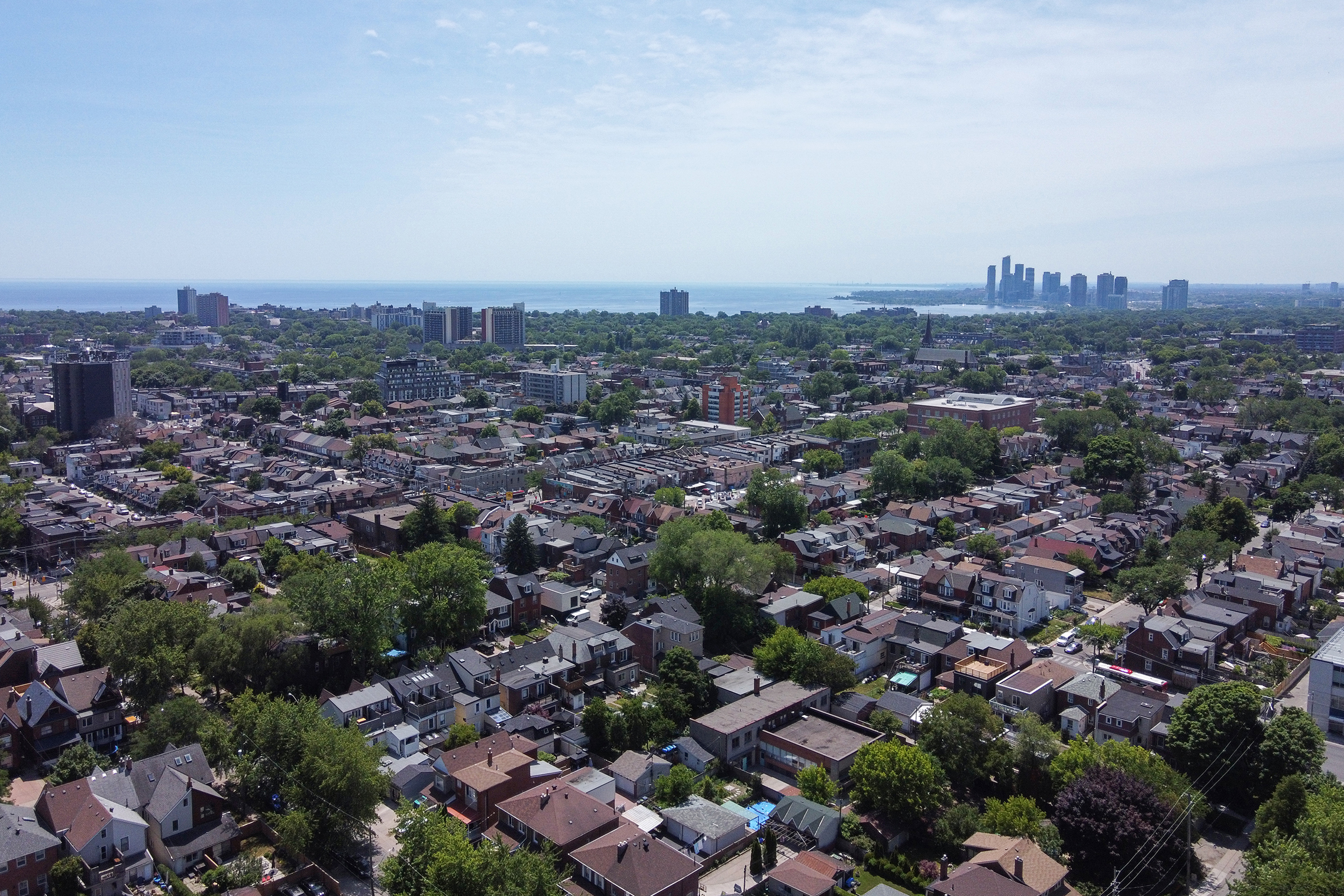
- Aerial view of Brockton Village in 2022
- Motto: Industry, Intelligence & Economy
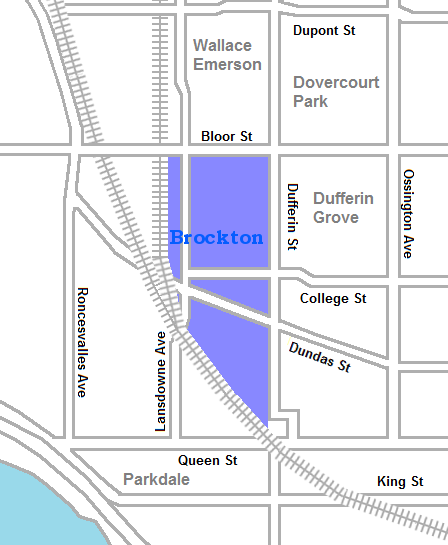
- Neighbourhood map
- Coordinates: 43°39′00″N 79°26′08″W
- Country: Canada
- Province: Ontario
- City: Toronto
- Incorporated: 1876 (Village); 1881 (Town)
- Annexed: 1884 into City of Toronto

Government
  - City Councillor: Alejandra Bravo (Ward 9)
  - Federal M.P.: Julie Dzerowicz (Davenport)
  - Provincial M.P.P.: Marit Stiles (Davenport)

Brockton is a former village, and now a neighbourhood in Toronto, Ontario, Canada. The neighbourhood comprises part of the historic village of Brockton, which was annexed by the City of Toronto in 1884.

The Village of Brockton was incorporated in 1880 and organized in 1881, with its boundaries extending from Bloor Street in the north to the railway tracks and a line between Wright Avenue and Fern Avenue to the south. The village stretched from Dufferin Street in the east to Sunnyside Avenue in the west. However not all the area became identified as Brockton neighbourhood. The section to the west of Lansdowne has become better known as Roncesvalles.

== History ==
In March 1812, Lot 30 in York Township, a 100-acre (40 ha) parcel of land, was granted to James Brock, a cousin of Sir Isaac Brock along with other parcels of land. This lot was a strip of land that stretched from Lot Street, today's Queen Street, north to Bloor Street, west of Dufferin Avenue.

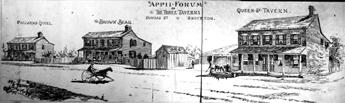
'Appii Forum', three taverns on Dundas Street at the tollgate in 1893.

After Brock died, his widow Lucy Brock inherited his estate and she began selling the lands that Brock owned. She commissioned a roadway along the centre-line of the lot parcel, along its whole length. The road, built in 1850, is known today as Brock Avenue. The lands of lot 30 were sub-divided for small land-holders and development occurred. This unincorporated settlement took on the name of Brockton.

The developed area of Brockton grew to border Sunnyside Avenue on the west, Dufferin (then the border of Toronto) on the east, Bloor on the north and the rail-lines to the south-west by the time it was established as an unincorporated village in 1876, within the County of York. It became an incorporated town in 1880 and then its population was recorded at 786 in the 1881 Census of Canada. The village was annexed by the City of Toronto in 1884.

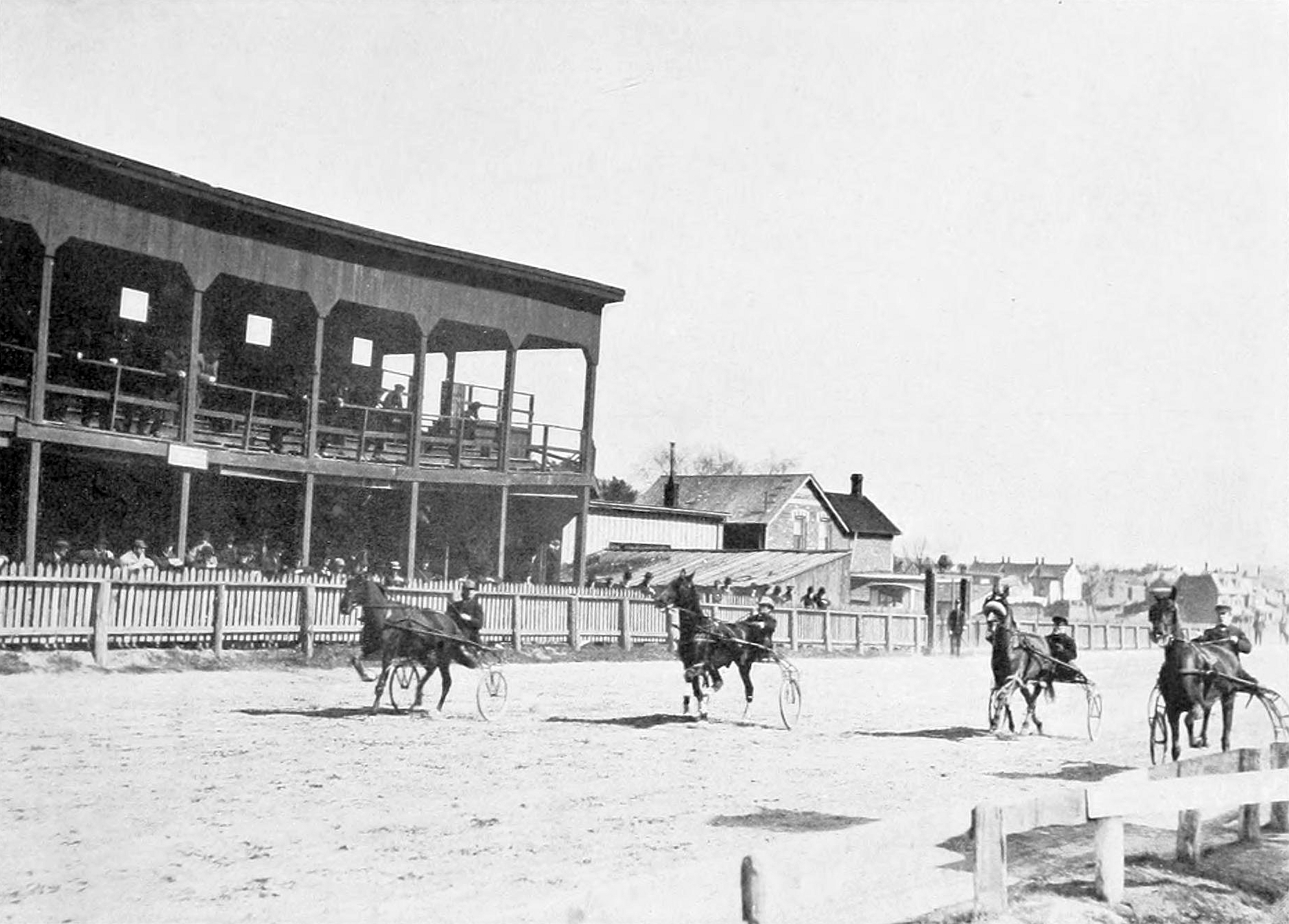
The area was home to Dufferin Racetrack from 1907 to 1956.

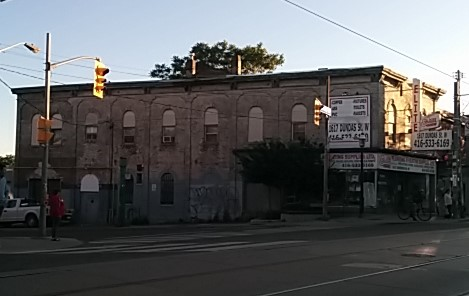
Brockton Hall on Brock Avenue and Dundas Street in 2016

From 1907 to 1956, the site was home to horse racing at Dufferin Racetrack. The track was later closed and converted to a shopping plaza. The plaza, Dufferin Mall, is an enclosed shopping centre to the south of Bloor Street, on the west side of Dufferin Avenue, and dominates shopping in the area with a large supermarket, department store, clothing and specialty stores. In the 1970s, the large parking lot was converted to a three-storey parking garage, and the number of stores doubled in conjunction with the enclosure of the pedestrian space. Brock Avenue was also home to the outdoor Grand National Rink (located at baseball field in what is today's McCormick Arena), which was once considered for the new home of the Toronto Hockey Club but turned down as it was an outdoor facility.

The site of Mike’s No Frills at 222 Lansdowne Avenue was once occupied by St. Helen’s Parish Roman Catholic Church (1875–1909) and school. When the church moved further east the land then became Elias Rogers Coal and Lumber Yard, army barracks during World War I until National Cash Register opened their plant (built by Thomas E. Muirhead) in 1936.Knob Hill Farms took over the plant in 1975 until the grocer folded in 2000 and after brief vacancy became the current No Frills store. However, only part of the Art Moderne facade remains.

Over the last half of the 20th century, the area south of College Street saw the influx of Portuguese immigrants and is also known as part of the Little Portugal neighbourhood. Today's 'Brockton Village' encompasses that section north of the rail lines between Dufferin and Lansdowne, south of Bloor Street.

Today, remnants of the former Brockton still exist, including its former town hall. The hall was converted to commercial usage, and is located at the south-west corner of Dundas Street West and Brock Avenue. Until recently, there was Brockton High School, which hadn't functioned as that high school for years. It was once Ursula Franklin Academy, it was used by the Royal Conservatory of Music's bookstore, and it was used by FoodShare Toronto. In 2019 it was torn down completely. In May 2020 the lot was transformed into Bloordale Beach. It's located at Brock Avenue and Croatia Street, near Bloor Street.

== Education ==
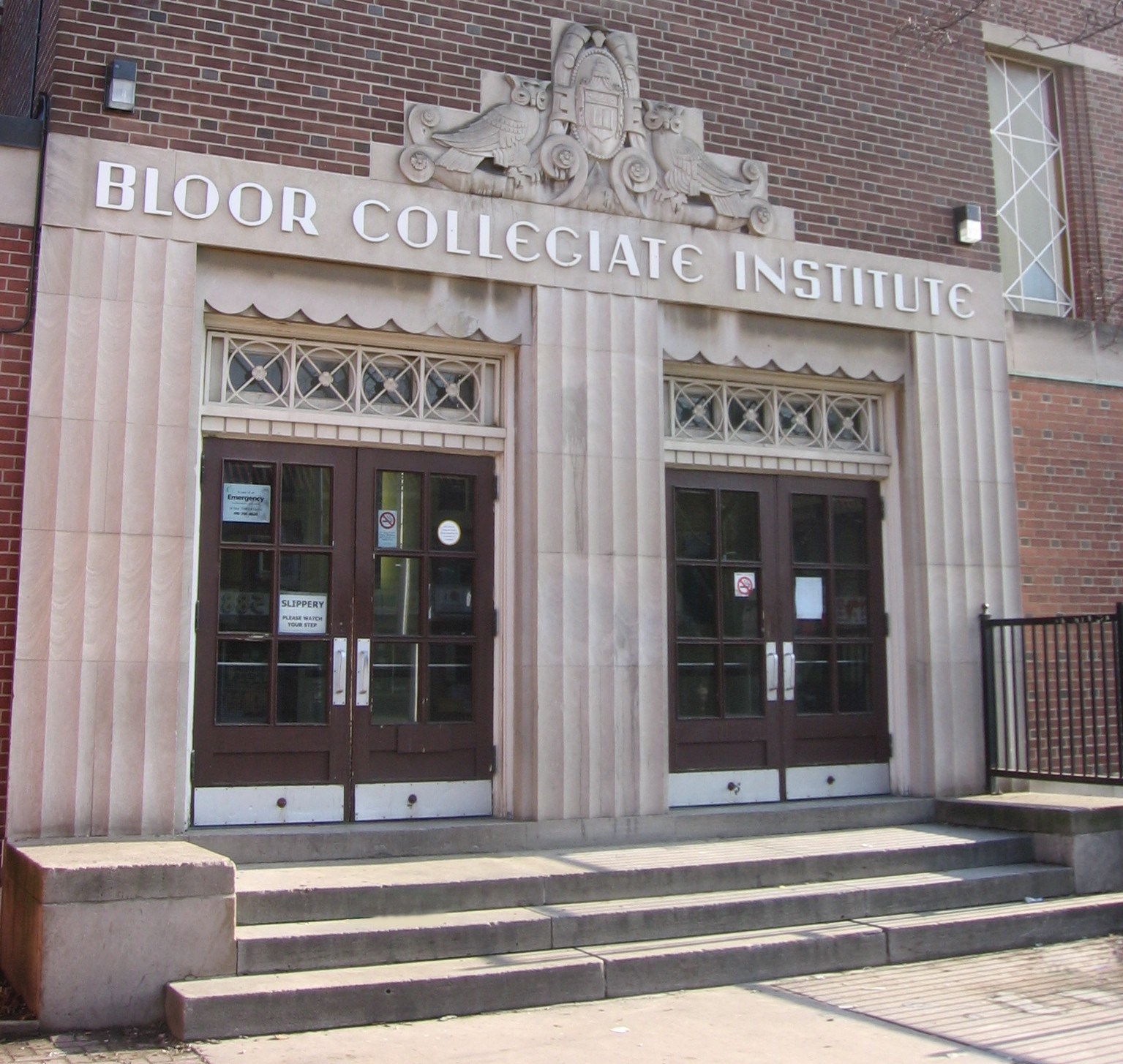
Bloor Collegiate Institute is one of three public secondary schools in Brockton Village.

Four public school boards operate in Brockton Village, Conseil scolaire catholique MonAvenir (CSCM), Conseil scolaire Viamonde (CSV), the Toronto Catholic District School Board (TCDSB), and the Toronto District School Board (TDSB).

TDSB is a secular public school board that operates one secondary school in the neighbourhood, Bloor Collegiate Institute. In addition to Bloor Street, TDSB also operates three elementary schools, Brock Public School, Kent Senior Public School, and Shirley Street Junior Public School.

TCDSB is a separate public school board that operates one elementary school in the neighbourhood, St. Helen Catholic School.

CSCM and CSV are French first language public school boards, the former being a separate school board, whereas the latter is a secular school board. Both school boards operate one secondary school in Brockton Village, CSCM operates École secondaire catholique Saint-Frère-André, while CSV operates École secondaire Toronto Ouest. Both schools share the same building, formerly used by West Toronto Collegiate Institute.
