= Ursula Franklin Academy =

Location
- 146 Glendonwynne Road; Toronto, Ontario, M6P 3E3; Canada

Information
- School type: Public, High school
- Founded: 1995
- School board: Toronto District School Board (Toronto Board of Education)
- School number: 5604 / 949027
- Principal: Anne Chirakal
- Grades: 9-12
- Enrolment: 540 (2025-26)
- Language: English
- Area: Toronto
- Colours: Navy Blue, Hunter Green, Burgundy, Snow White
- Team name: Franklin Flames
- Website: www.ufacademy.org

Ursula Franklin Academy (colloquially known as UFA; pronounced as oo-faa) is a public high school run by the Toronto District School Board in Canada's largest city, Toronto. UFA was founded in 1995 and is named after the activist and experimental physicist. Since 2002 UFA has shared a building with Western Technical-Commercial School and The Student School, in the High Park neighbourhood.

== History ==
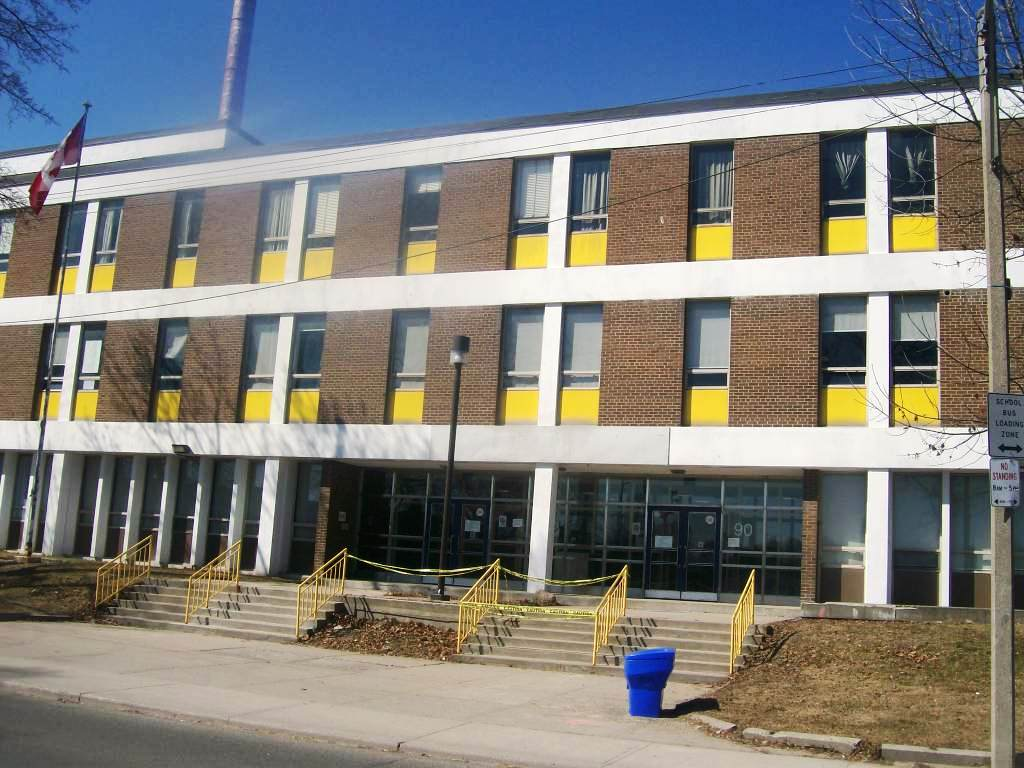
Former home of Ursula Franklin Academy from 1995-2002.

A think tank created the concept of the school. UFA was owned by the Toronto Board of Education until its merger into the Toronto District School Board.

Ursula Franklin Academy opened in the fall of 1995 in the former Brockton High School, which originally was built and named in 1966. The Toronto Board of Education (TBE) planned it as a traditional academic school that had focus on languages, mathematics, science, and technology. John Doherty, a trustee in the TBE, said that "We're not trying to create a magnet school or an elite school that has waiting lists and so on. We want it serving the local community."

UFA has no feeder schools and as a result, students attend from a variety of middle schools, usually after applying and winning a space secured through a competitive lottery system. It was the Toronto Board of Education's first school to require students to wear uniforms.

Ursula Franklin Academy moved into Western Technical-Commercial School in September 2002.

== Notable alumni ==
- Kosi Thompson

== See also ==
- Education in Ontario
- List of secondary schools in Ontario
