= Bloor Collegiate Institute =

Location
- 90 Croatia Street; Toronto, Ontario, M6H 0G4; Canada; 43.659292°N 79.436994°W

Information
- School type: Public, high school
- Motto: Quod Incepimus Conficiemus (What We Have Begun, We Shall Finish.)
- Founded: 1925
- School board: Toronto District School Board (Toronto Board of Education)
- Superintendent: Mike Gallagher
- Area trustee: Alexis Dawson
- School number: 5505 / 895407
- Principal: Janice Gladstone
- Grades: 9-12
- Enrolment: 824 (2019-20)
- Language: English
- Colours: Maroon and Gold
- Team name: Bloor Golden Bears
- Public transit access: TTC: North/South: 29 Dufferin; Rapid Transit: Dufferin
- Website: schools.tdsb.on.ca/bloorci/

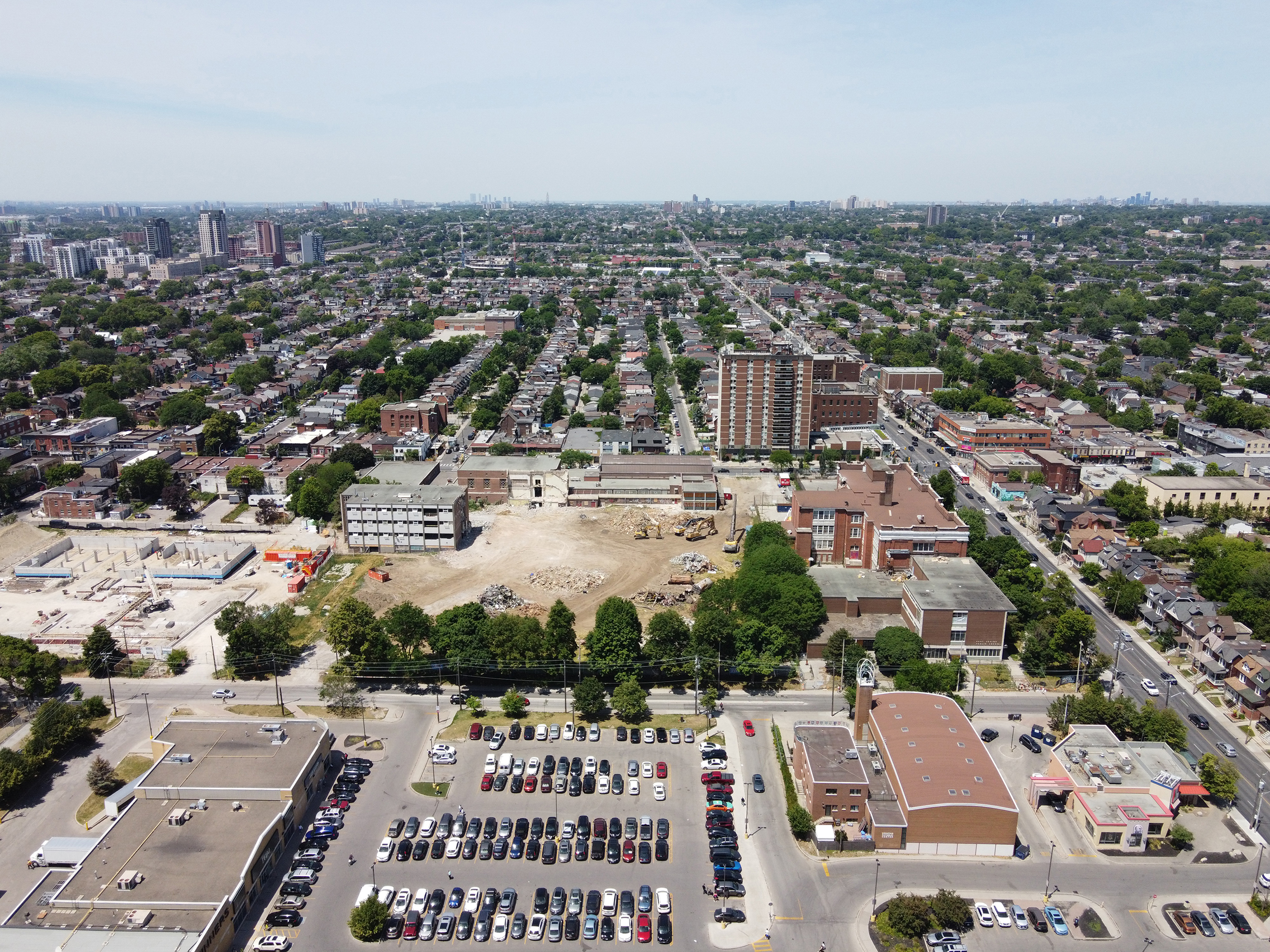
School ready to be demolished in Summer, 2022

Bloor Collegiate Institute is a public secondary school in Toronto, Ontario, Canada. It is located at the intersection of Bloor Street and Dufferin Street, in the Dufferin Grove neighbourhood. The school was originally part of the Toronto Board of Education that was merged into the Toronto District School Board. Attached to the school is Alpha II Alternative School.

In fall 2021, the school was demolished. Students were relocated to Central Technical School. The 7.6 acres (3.1 ha) school property was transferred to the Toronto Lands Corporation, a TDSB-managed realtor arm. The new school on Brock St was completed during summer 2025, allowing students to relocate back from Central Technical School. A Change.org petition was created to rename the school Bloordale Beach CI, since the new school was to be located on the site of Bloordale Beach.

== History ==
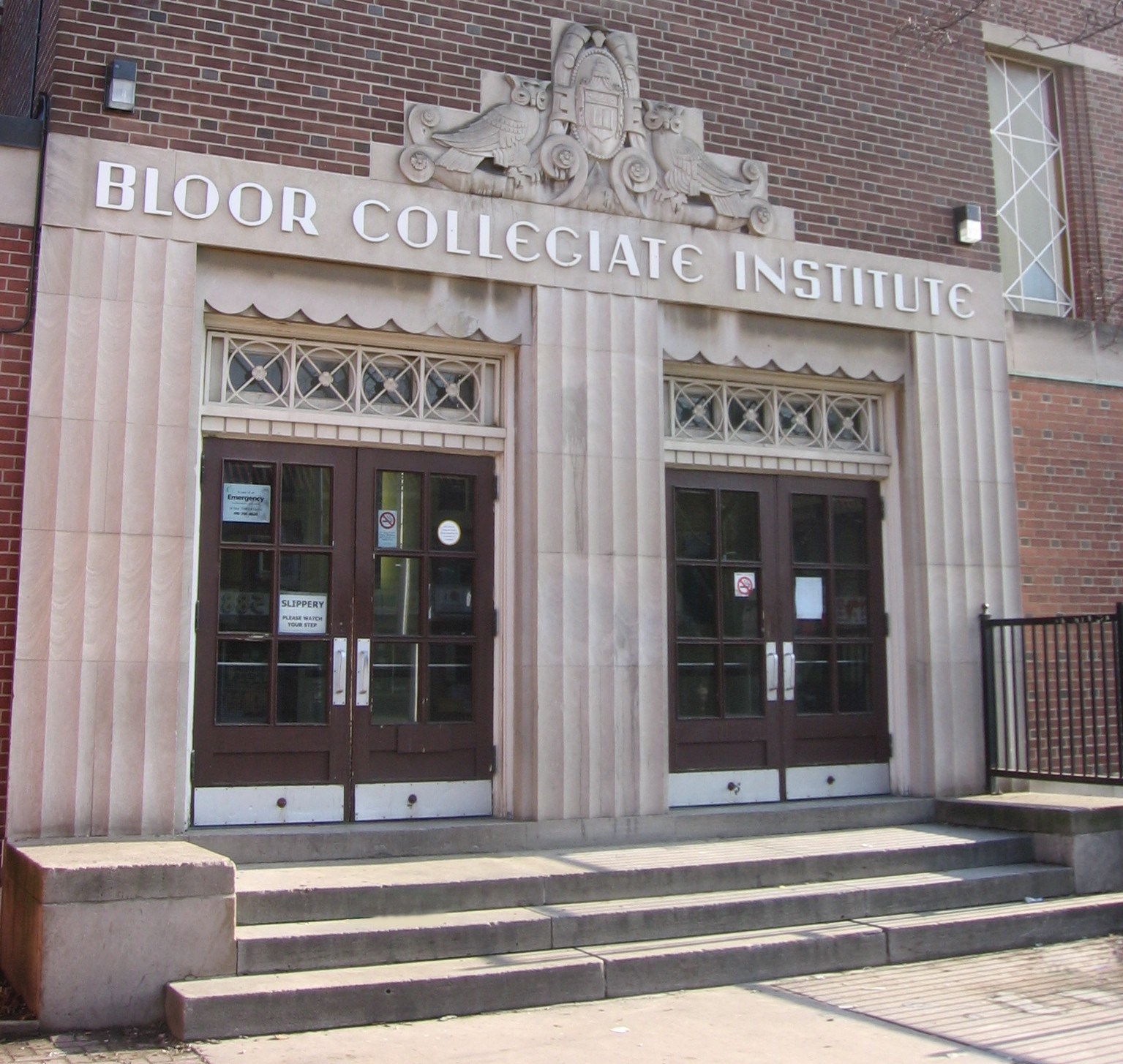
For over a century, Bloor Collegiate was housed in this historic Collegiate Gothic building.

The school was founded in 1920 as Davenport High School located in five classrooms on the top floor of the Jesse Ketchum Public School to form the first student body that became Bloor High School. It later became Bloor Collegiate Institute in October 1925, and the original building opened in September 1925 had 15 standard classrooms, one lecture room, physics and science rooms.

In the 1970s, the school fielded sports teams in football, soccer, hockey, basketball, cricket, volleyball, rugby, cross-country running, track and field, and archery. Today, sports like Ultimate Frisbee, badminton have also been added to the roster. Teams compete in the "junior" level (grades 9 and 10 students), and the "senior" level (grades 11 and 12 students). There are intramural (within the school) and extramural competitions (against other schools).

In 2011, the school won more gold medals at the Toronto Sci-Tech Fair than any other school, and went on to send two students onto the national science fair. Both of these students were from the TOPS Program.

The school was named as the TDSB secondary school showing the greatest rate of improvement in the 2011–2012 Fraser Institute Report. The school is now (as of the 2014–2015 ranking) ranked at 16th place out of the 627 secondary schools in the province. Over the previous five years, the school had ranked at approximately 78th place. The improvement is credited in part to substantial improvements on the EQAO Mathematics Assessment, which is written by grade 9 students. "That is a tremendous result for a school of modest-means families, where ESL is a strong component and special needs as well," states Peter Cowley from the Fraser Institute.

== Relocation to Brockton ==
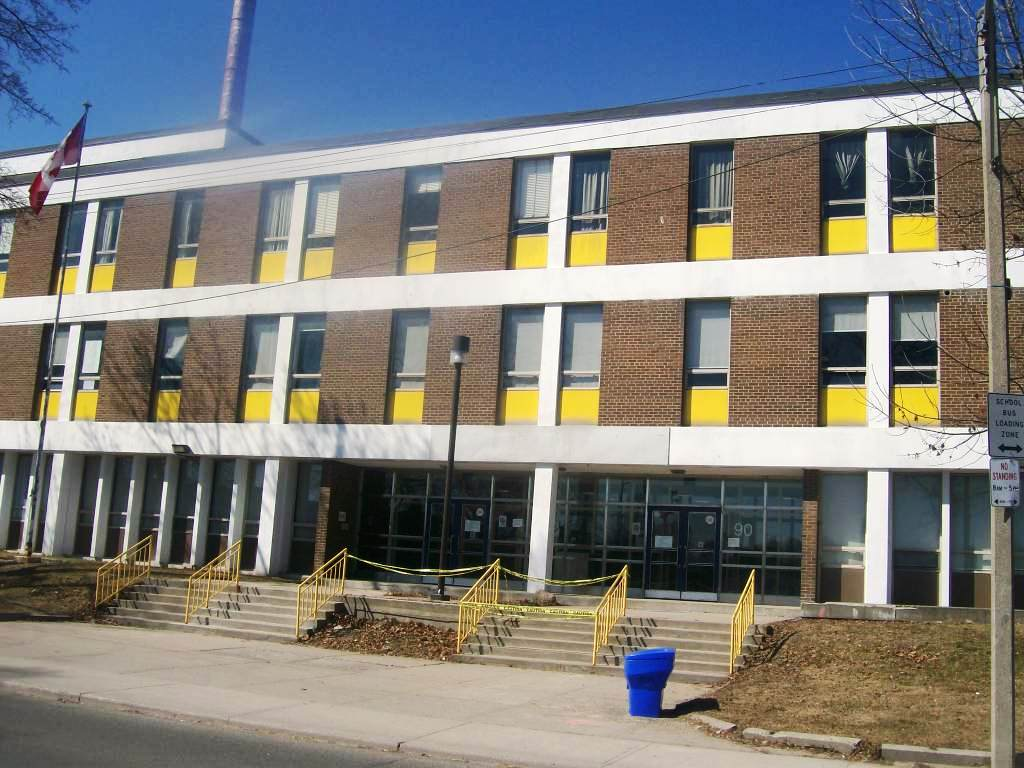
Future home of Bloor Collegiate at Brockton, effective September 2017.

In October 2009, the Toronto District School Board passed the redevelopment plan on Bloor/Dufferin. As a result, two schools were closed after the ARC review: Kent Senior Public School (2012) and West Toronto Collegiate Institute (2010).

The Toronto District School Board will receive capital funding from the provincial government for the school's renovations. Meanwhile, the Toronto Lands Corporation, a realtor arm of the school board, declared 7.6 acres of the Bloor and Kent properties surplus and were placed up for sale.

Offers have been made by the Toronto Catholic District School Board to acquire a portion of the property in concert with the City of Toronto.

In 2016, the province committed to contributing $20 million toward the development of a new school and community hub on surplus TDSB land at the southwest corner of Bloor and Dufferin streets. The province proposed a 30,000-square-foot community hub for the area, which would include licensed child care spaces. A replacement high school was eventually built on the site of Brockton High School, which was closed for a number of years before it was demolished in 2019. The new space became the new home for the Bloor Collegiate Institute and Alpha II Senior Alternative School. It accommodates approximately 900 students. From May 2020 to Sept 2021, the construction site functioned as Bloordale Beach. Since it was created during the height of the COVID-19 pandemic in 2020, it was a site much praised for offering a great deal of space for social distancing. Construction on the new school began in fall 2021 and its student body was temporarily housed at Central Technical School until spring 2025. Construction was completed in summer 2025, and its student body was relocated back to the new school.

== School culture ==
In the 1960s, 1970s and 1980s the student body was predominantly composed of immigrants and first-generation Canadians of immigrants of varied origin, especially English, Irish, Italian, Greek and Portuguese, Indian, Bengali, Japanese, Korean, Chinese, Jamaican, and Tamil background. Currently, 70% of students speak a language other than English at home. Bloor students come from the neighbouring community as well as from communities across the city for the TOPS on Bloor Program.

The school motto is "Quod Incepimus Conficiemus", meaning "What We Have Begun, We Shall Finish" in Latin. (It is shared with Colonel By Secondary School, Gloucester, Ontario).

== Student achievements ==
- Tony Silipo Memorial Award: 2012
- Recipient of Loran Scholarship: 2013
- Participants at DECA International 2013, 2014, 2015, 2016
- TDSB Top Graduate: 2014 and 2015
- Queen's University Chancellor Scholarship Recipient: 2014
- AP Scholars with Distinction
- Schulich Leadership Scholarship: 2016

== TOPS on Bloor Program ==
Bloor Collegiate Institute houses the TOPS on Bloor program ("Talented Offerings for Programs in the Sciences"). The program was established in September 2009 after the board decided to expand the program at Marc Garneau Collegiate Institute. However, the programs at both schools are fully independent from each other. In order to apply to this specialized program, grade 8 students must pass an entrance exam covering math, science and writing skills. As of September 2023, this exam has been replaced by a lottery, by mandate of the Toronto District School Board Student Interest Programs Policy. The program was established in September 2009 after the board decided to expand the program at Marc Garneau Collegiate Institute. A student profile and a final grade 7 report card are also part of the application package. There is also a fee, which pays for all core field trips and classroom materials beyond the Ontario curriculum, allowing for additional enrichment. TOPS students have gone on to National Science Fairs, International Business competitions, and others, thus familiarizing Bloor CI's name on the international stage.

== Notable staff ==
- Ivor Wynne, teacher and later director of athletics at McMaster University

== Notable alumni ==
- Tony Silipo, School Trustee, NDP MPP, Minister of Education
- Frank Gehry, Architect
- Peter Glassen, Philosopher
- Ric Holt, Computer Scientist
- Susan Ioannou, Poet
- Rik Emmett, Musician
- Derek McGrath, Actor Poet
- Terence Young, Form
- Mandy Lam, Actress
- Morley Safer, Journalist

== See also ==
- Education in Ontario
- List of secondary schools in Ontario
