= Western Technical-Commercial School =

Location
- 125 Evelyn Crescent; High Park North, Toronto, Ontario, M6P 3E3; Canada; 43.656742°N 79.47506°W

Information
- Former names: Western Branch Technical School; Western High School of Commerce
- School type: Public high school Vocational high school
- Founded: 1927
- School board: Toronto District School Board (Toronto Board of Education)
- Superintendent: Alex Tracey; FOS07
- Area trustee: Debbie King; Ward 7
- School number: 5625 / 951951
- Principal: Mark Koczij
- Grades: 9–12
- Enrolment: 1430
- Language: English
- Schedule type: Semestered
- Colours: Green, white and black
- Mascot: Colton
- Nickname: Western Tech, Western TCS, Dub Tech
- Team name: Colts
- Website: www.wtcs.ca

Western Technical High School

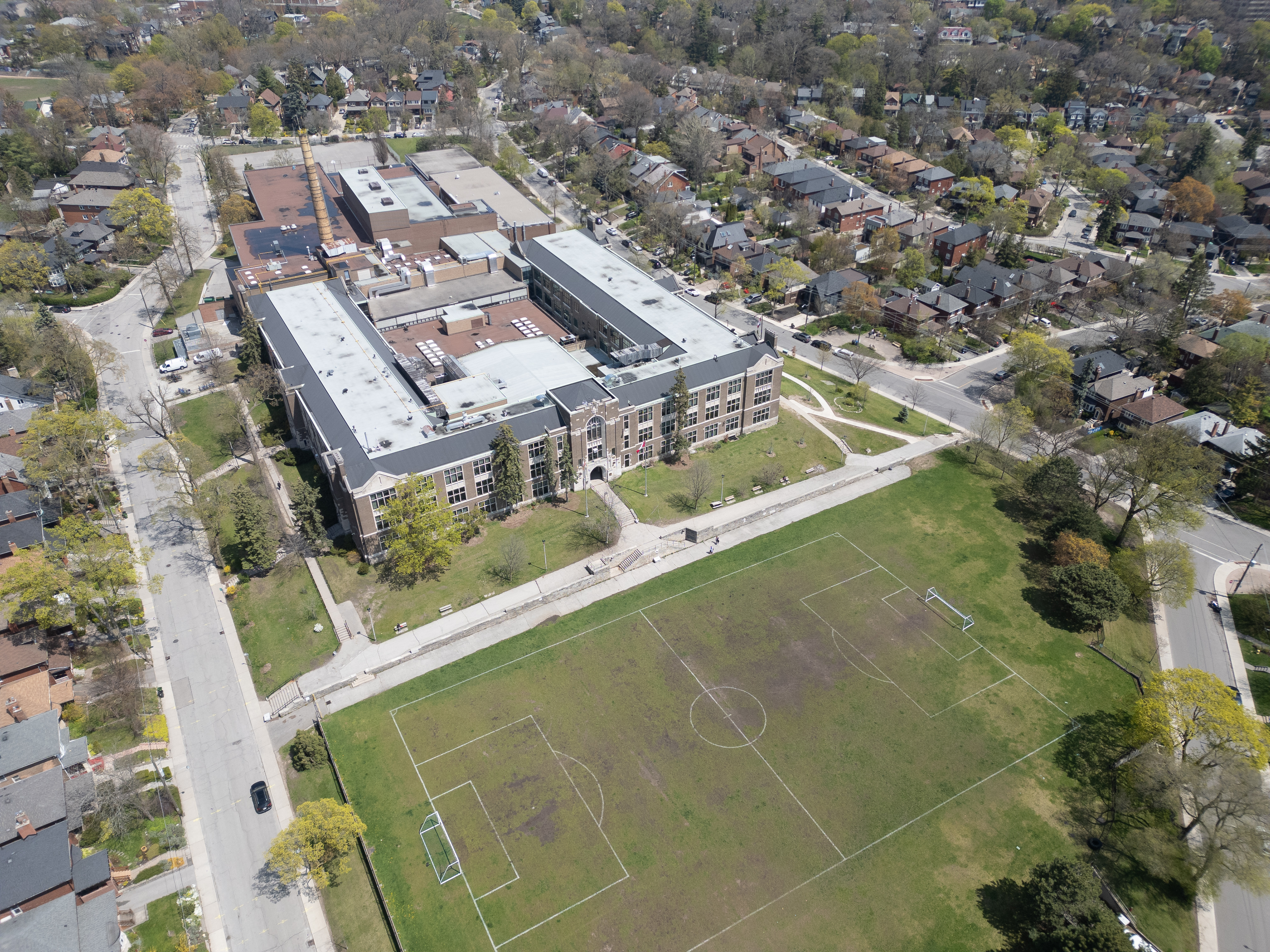
Aerial photograph of Western Technical High School

Western Technical-Commercial School is a high school in the High Park North neighbourhood of Toronto, Ontario, Canada administered by the Toronto District School Board. It shares the same building with Ursula Franklin Academy and The Student School. The school was founded in 1927 and was part of the Toronto Board of Education until 1998.

Originally two schools when it was opened, Western Branch Technical School and Western High School of Commerce, the present school is now the product of the merger of the two.

Western, commonly called WTCS or Western Tech, offers courses from grade 9 through 12 in Academic and Gifted levels. In 2022, it was reported to have 1139 total students enrolled. The school population in 2024-25 was approximately 1430 students.

== History ==
The main Collegiate Gothic building was constructed in 1927 by architect Charles Edmund Cyril Dyson with the addition being constructed in 1967–1970. The school features amenities such as a pool and two gyms, a greenhouse, a large library, and a media lab.

The school has been used as a filming location for a number of movies and TV shows, including Billy Madison, Being Erica, and The Queen's Gambit.

== Media ==
In the 2000s, Western Tech students started a newspaper titled The Hidden Agenda, with issues printed as recently as 2011 and some online activity in 2012. It reported on student events and was run by students with final approval by the administration. In the 2022/2023 academic year, it was revived under the name The Horseshoe.

== Athletics ==
The school has a wide variety of teams and intramurals, from the traditional soccer, basketball, hockey, water polo and baseball to ping pong and a Reach for the Top quiz team. Intramurals include floor hockey, volleyball, and basketball, among others. Western has a full size pool, and runs Bronze Medallion and Bronze Cross courses at greatly reduced prices for students of the school. Current aquatics leadership students are welcomed to assist in teaching the program.

== Manufacturing Technology/Robotics ==
Western Technical-Commercial School offers a number of manufacturing technology courses utilizing the schools machine shop facilities. The school also has a successful FIRST Robotics team (865/Warp7).

== Notable alumni ==
- J. P. Anderson, hockey player
- Brandon Ash-Mohammed, comedian and actor
- Gwendolyn MacEwen, poet
- Don McKenzie, former professional football player
- Bill Quackenbush, hockey player

== See also ==
- Education in Ontario
- List of secondary schools in Ontario
