= Susan Ioannou =

Canadian poet

- Born: October 4, 1944 (age 81); Toronto, Ontario, Canada
- Education: University of Toronto
- Occupation: Author
- Writing career
- Genres: Poetry, Fiction, Literary Nonfiction, Children's Literature

Susan Ioannou (born October 4, 1944) is a Canadian poet who lives in Toronto, Ontario.

== Biography ==
Ioannou was born October 4, 1944, to Frank and Margaret Thomas. As a young child, she wrote fiction, but by her teen years, she wrote more poetry than fiction. In 1966 she received her bachelor's degree and a year later, her master's degree from the University of Toronto. While attending the University of Toronto, she received the school's Nora Epstein Foundation award for poetry.

In August 1967 she married Lazaros Ioannou.

Ioannou taught English at Bloor Collegiate Institute, for six years during the 1970s. In 1973, she was the Vice-President of the Ontario Council of Teachers of English.

From 1980 to 1989, she served as associate editor of Cross Canada Writers' Quarterly. She also served as editor of Coiffure du Canada (1979-1980), co-editor of Poemata (1988-1989), and poetry editor for Arts Scarborough Newsletter (1980-1985).

Into the 1990s, Ioannou led poetry workshops for the Toronto Board of Education, Ryerson University, and University of Toronto School of Continuing Studies. In 1985, she founded the writers' resource Wordwrights Canada, and in 1988, created its poetry course, which until 2017 ran online as Lessons in Writing the Poem.

Her poetry has inspired music by contemporary composers, Norwegian Gjermund Andreassen and Canadian Leslie Uyeda.

== Work ==
Iannou's writing has appeared in a variety of anthologies including The Canlit Food Book (1987), Celebrating Canadian Women (1989), Kitchen Talk: Contemporary Women's Prose and Poetry (1992), Crossing Boundaries: An International Anthology of Women's Experiences in Sport (1999), and Myth Weavers (2007). Her poems have been published in numerous literary journals, including The Antigonish Review, Descant, The Prairie Journal of Canadian Literature, Prism International, Malahat Review and Room of One's Own.

Ioannou describes her process of writing poetry as "meditative" and that she draws from "details of everyday life." In one interview, Ioannou remarked, "Whenever I write poetry, I am relentlessly dissatisfied. Again and again, I try (and fail) to reach one ideal: In the largest meaning of the word, to be true. I admire any poet who can teach me how to give words a nugget's solid brilliance, how to make lines stretch or snap, how to lift a poem on a shout or a song. I am always searching for the poem that can instruct and amaze me. This search drove my literary study A Magical Clockwork."

In reviewing one of Ioannou's earliest works, Motherpoems, Louise Longo wrote that "Ioannou's work, at its best, has a street-wise toughness, coupled with an eye for detail that is effective. Unfortunately many of her poems are in need of ruthless editing." While Longo praised the emotional range of Ioannou's poems in this volume, she also perceived a judgmental attitude toward women who were not mothers and an assumption that women ultimately find fulfillment in motherhood alone.

Her poetry has been favorably reviewed by Mark Cochrane who describes her collection Clarity between Clouds as a reboot of the "quest for clarity and solidity in a blurry and crumbling posthumanist epoch."

Ioannou's book of poems about minerals and rocks, Looking Through Stone: Poems About the Earth was distributed in Ontario schools as part of a specialist curriculum. Her interest in writing about geology grew when her son was completing his PhD work. Ioannou relates that she spent ten years learning and reading about geology and whenever something interested her, she tried to create a poem based on that idea.

In 1990, Ioannou received the Memorial Award for nonfiction from the Media Club of Canada and, in 1997, the Okanaga Short Story Award, as well as several grants from the Ontario Arts Council.

Of her 2016 poetry collection Looking for Light, reviewer Sharon Berg writes: "She has a grasp of the element of time that stretches beyond her own stand on this earth and her poetry manages both to enlighten and delight us."

== Bibliography ==
=== Poetry ===
- Spare Words (1984). Pierian Press: Brandon, Manitoba, Canada
- Motherpoems (1985). Wordwrights Canada: Toronto; (2016) eBook; (2017) Kindle Paperback
- The Crafted Poem: A Step by Step Guide to Writing and Appreciation (1985). Wordwrights Canada. Toronto.
- Familiar Faces/Private Grief (1986). Wordwrights Canada: Toronto; (2016) eBook, (2017) Kindle Paperback
- Clarity Between Clouds: Poems of Midlife (1991). Goose Lane Editions: Fredericton, New Brunswick, Canada; (2016) eBook.
- Where the Light Waits (1996). Ekstasis Editions. Victoria, British Columbia, Canada,
- Read-Aloud Poems (2001); 2011 PDF
- Coming Home: An Old Love Story (2004). Leaf Press: Lantzville, British Columbia, Canada; (2011) PDF
- Who Would Be a God? A Debate in Poetry (with Lenny Everson) (2004). Passion among the Cacti Press: Kitchener, Ontario, Canada.
- Balkan Poems (2005). PDF
- O Canada (2005). PDF
- The Merla Poems (2006). Wordwrights Canada: Toronto; (2011) PDF
- Catalysts & Catastrophes: Feline Poems (2007). PDF
- Looking Through Stone: Poems about the Earth (2007). Your Scrivener Press: Sudbury, Ontario, Canada; (2010) eBook; (2017) Kindle Paperback
- Looking for Light (2016). Paperback, 2020 eBook
- For the Love of Lazaros (2019). Kindle Paperback
- The Dance Between: Poems About Women (2019). Kindle Paperback; (2020) eBook

=== Nonfiction/Instructional ===
- Ten Ways to Tighten Your Prose: A Systematic Approach to Improvement (1988). Wordwrights Canada: Toronto. revised digital edition, 2004.
- Writing Reader-Friendly Poems Plus Writing Exercises (1989). Wordwrights Canada: Toronto; (2011) eBook; (2017) Kindle Paperback
- A Magical Clockwork: The Art of Writing the Poem (2000). Wordwrights Canada: Toronto.
- Holding True: Essays on Being a Writer (2008); (2010) eBook; (2017) Kindle Paperback

=== Children's literature ===
- Polly's Punctuation Primer (1991). Wordwrights Canada: Toronto. (2004) revised edition.
- A Real Farm Girl (1998). Illustrated by James Rozak. Hodgepog Books: Vancouver, British Columbia, Canada; (2010) eBook
- The Hidden Valley Mystery (2010) eBook; (2017) Kindle Paperback

=== Fiction ===
- Nine to Ninety: Stories across the generations (2009). 2010 eBook, 2017 Kindle Paperback

=== Reviewing ===
- The Witch of the Inner Wood: Collected Long Poems by M. Travis Lane, The League of Canadian Poets Reviews, 2017
- Smaller Hours by Kevin Shaw, The Antigonish Review, 2018
- Practical Anxiety by Heidi Greco, The League of Canadian Poets Reviews, 2018
