= Lakeview Secondary School =

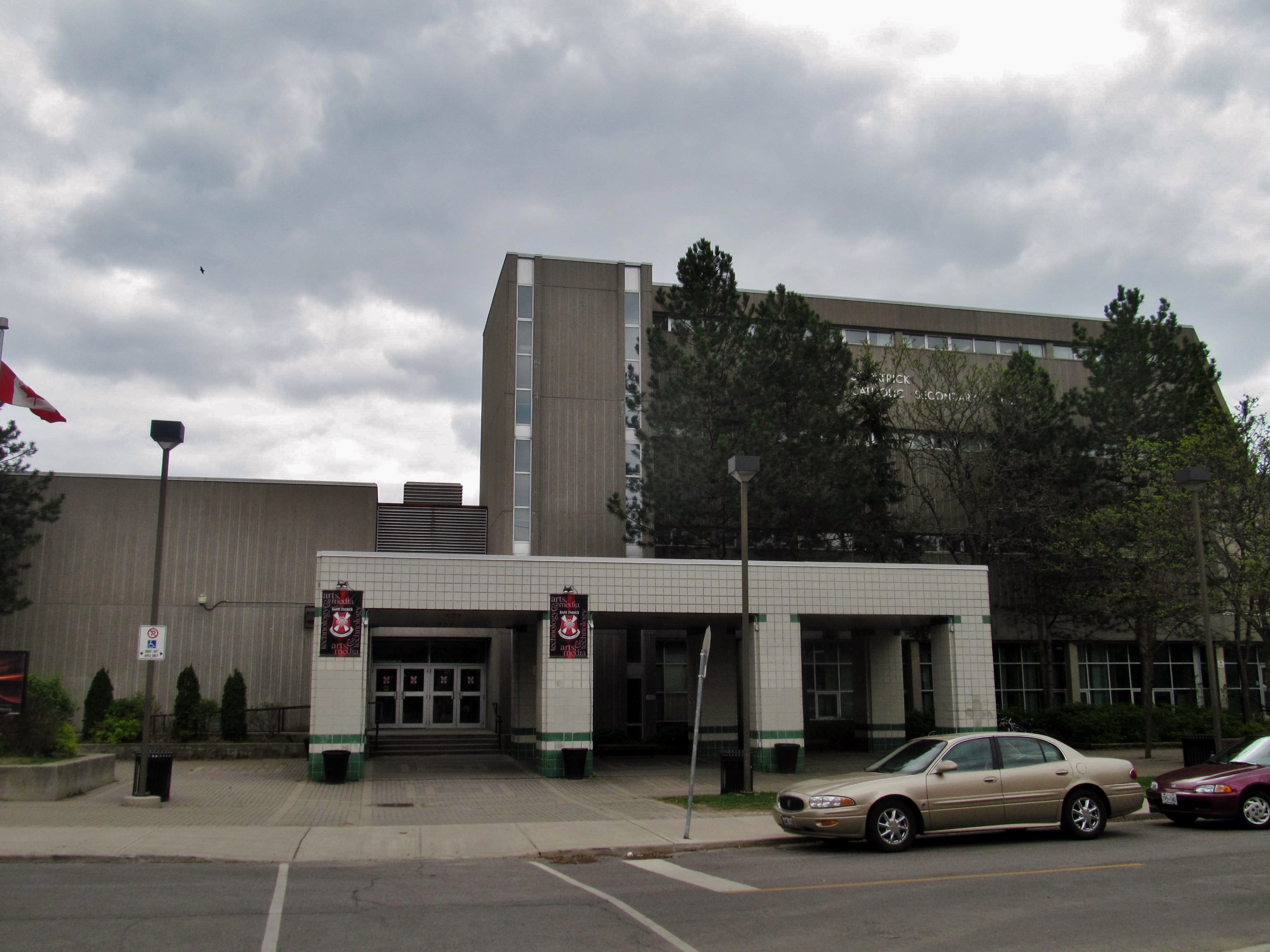

Location
- 49 Felstead Avenue; East Danforth, Toronto, Ontario, M4J 1G3; Canada; 43.678°N 79.328°W

Information
- Former name: East End High School
- School type: Public High school Vocational High school
- Religious affiliation: none
- Founded: 1967
- Status: Leased out (perpetual)
- Closed: 1989
- School board: Toronto District School Board (Toronto Board of Education)
- Oversight: Toronto Lands Corporation
- Superintendent: Sandy Spyropoulos; LC4, Superintendent; Mary Jane McNarara; LN23
- Area trustee: Jennifer Story; Ward 15
- School number: 906603
- Grades: 9-13
- Enrollment: 1150
- Language: English
- Colours: Red, Navy, and Light Blue
- Team name: Lakeview Lancers

Lakeview Secondary School (LSS, Lakeview), formerly East End High School is a Toronto District School Board public and vocational high school facility that was formerly operated as a secondary school by the Toronto Board of Education from 1967 until 1989 located in Felstad Drive in Toronto, Ontario, Canada serving the Board's Ward 15. Founded in 1967, the current building was built in 1972. The Lakeview property, as of January 2015, remains currently owned by the TDSB.

== History ==
Formerly East End High School, the school opened its doors in 1967 as an all boys school in the Coleman Avenue Public School property. Initially, East End contained portables and was given the name "Portable City" as the school grew and shops were expanded.

The Coleman school was demolished in 1973 to make way for William J. McCordic School, a congregated school for students with disabilities.

The sod of the new school was turned in June 1970 and the building was built in June 1972 at 45 Felstead Avenue on the former industrial property between Danforth and Greenwood. At the same time, East End High School became a co-ed school and renamed Lakeview Secondary School which opened for classes in September 1972. The auditorium and a swimming pool was also constructed.

As Lakeview, the school carried a variety of academics and tech skills as a specialized high school as well as four-year courses and had Business Services Programs. The girls were admitted to Lakeview came from Eastern Commerce Collegiate Institute.

In 1985 Cathy McPherson, the coordinator of the PUSH Central Region, stated that Lakeview and five other schools were listed as having "excellent" access for disabled persons by the Toronto Board of Education continuing education program.

With the decrease of low enrolment and funding of Catholic schools, Ned McKeown, director of the TBE, recommended that on January 7, 1988 that Lakeview and West Park Secondary School be closed and leased to the Metropolitan Separate School Board (now known as the Toronto Catholic District School Board) or MSSB from July 1989. Lakeview held its last classes in June 1989 and the MSSB reopened Lakeview as St. Patrick Catholic Secondary School on the Lakeview building in September of that year although the TBE retained the ground floor until 1994. Originally, the TBE planned to retain Lakeview as an adult education centre. The closure of Lakeview reallocated the funding for renovations at Riverdale and Forest Hill Collegiates.

== See also ==
- List of high schools in Ontario
- St. Patrick Catholic Secondary School
