= St. Patrick Catholic Secondary School =

Catholic high school in Toronto, Canada

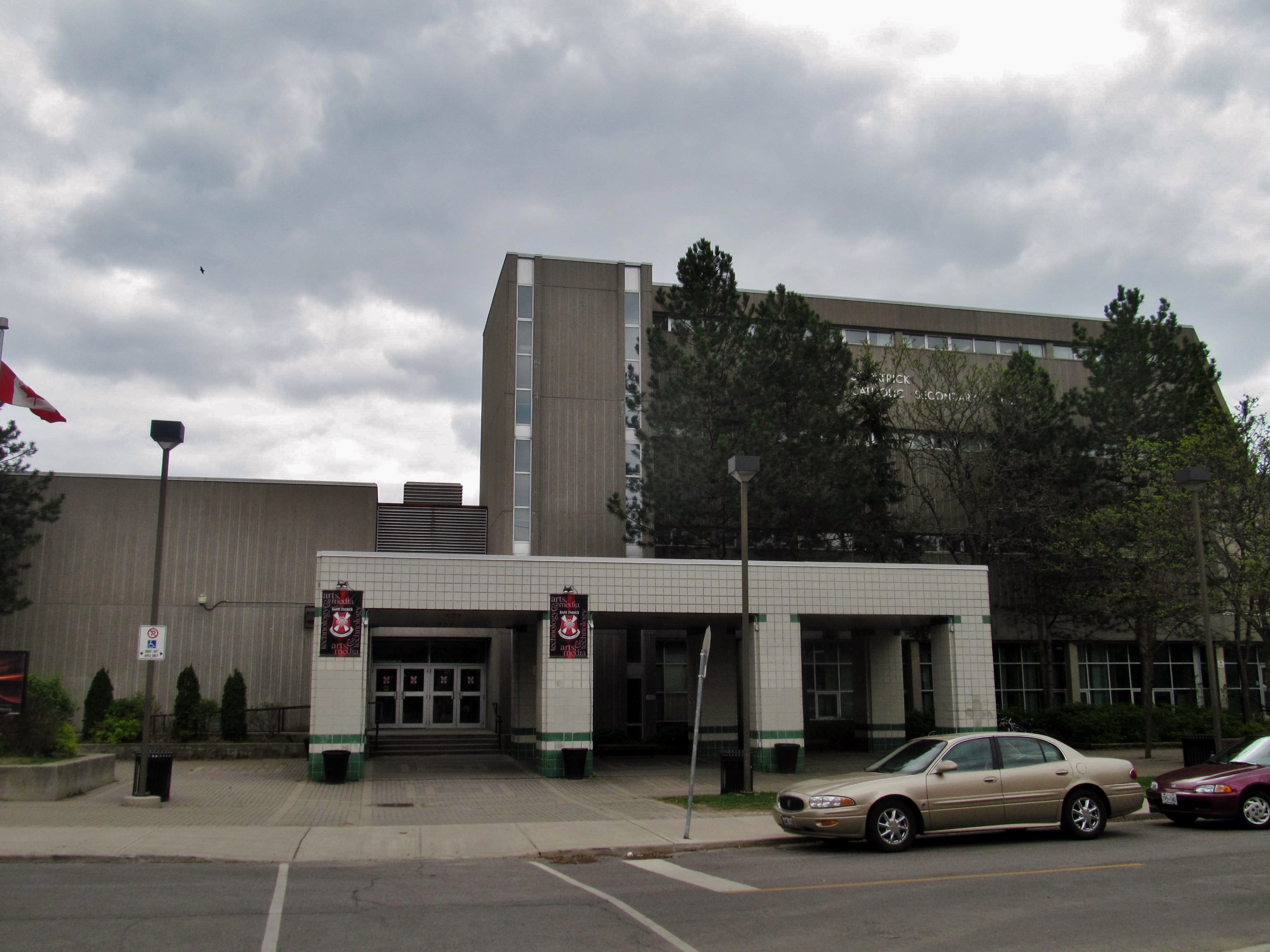
- The school in the former Lakeview Secondary School grounds, 2015.

Location
- 49 Felstead Avenue; Toronto, Ontario, M4J 1G3; Canada; 43.678151°N 79.328343°W

Information
- Former name: St. Patrick Catholic Elementary School (1852–1983)
- School type: Bill 30 Catholic High school Art school
- Motto: Amor Christi nos impellit (The Love of Christ Impels Us)
- Religious affiliations: Roman Catholic (Congregation of Notre Dame)
- Founded: 1852 (elementary); 1986 (secondary)
- School board: Toronto Catholic District School Board (Metropolitan Separate School Board)
- Superintendent: Kimberly Dixon; Area 1
- Area trustee: Angela Kennedy; Ward 11
- School number: 546 / 838268
- Principal: Michael Connolly
- Grades: 9-12
- Enrolment: 767 (2017-18)
- Language: English
- Area: East Danforth
- Colours: Red, black, silver, and white
- Team name: St. Patrick Patriots (1986-2013); St. Patrick Vipers (2013-present)
- Public transit access: TTC: North/South: 31 Greenwood, 22 Coxwell, 22B Coxwell; Rapid Transit: Greenwood, Coxwell
- Parish: St. Brigid
- Specialist high skills major: Construction; Hospitality and tourism
- Program focus: Advanced placement Enriched Arts; Media technology audition
- Website: www.tcdsb.org/o/stpatrick/

St. Patrick Catholic Secondary School (also referred to as SPCSS, St. Pats, St. Patrick, St. Patrick C.S.S. or Pats), formerly known as St. Patrick Catholic Elementary School is a Roman Catholic high school located in Toronto, Ontario, Canada as part of the Toronto Catholic District School Board. It is dedicated to Saint Patrick of Ireland and St. Marguerite Bourgeoys, the founder of the Congregation of Notre Dame.

One of Toronto's oldest schools, St. Patrick's used to be an elementary school founded in 1852 until 1983 and turned into a secondary school which opened in 1986 on D'Arcy Street (now the Toronto District School Board's Heydon Park Secondary School). Since September 1989, St. Patrick had been moved from downtown Toronto into the former Lakeview Secondary School (also owned by the TDSB) in Toronto's east end. The motto for St. Patrick is "Amor Christi nos impellit" which translates to English as "The Love of Christ Impels Us".

== History ==
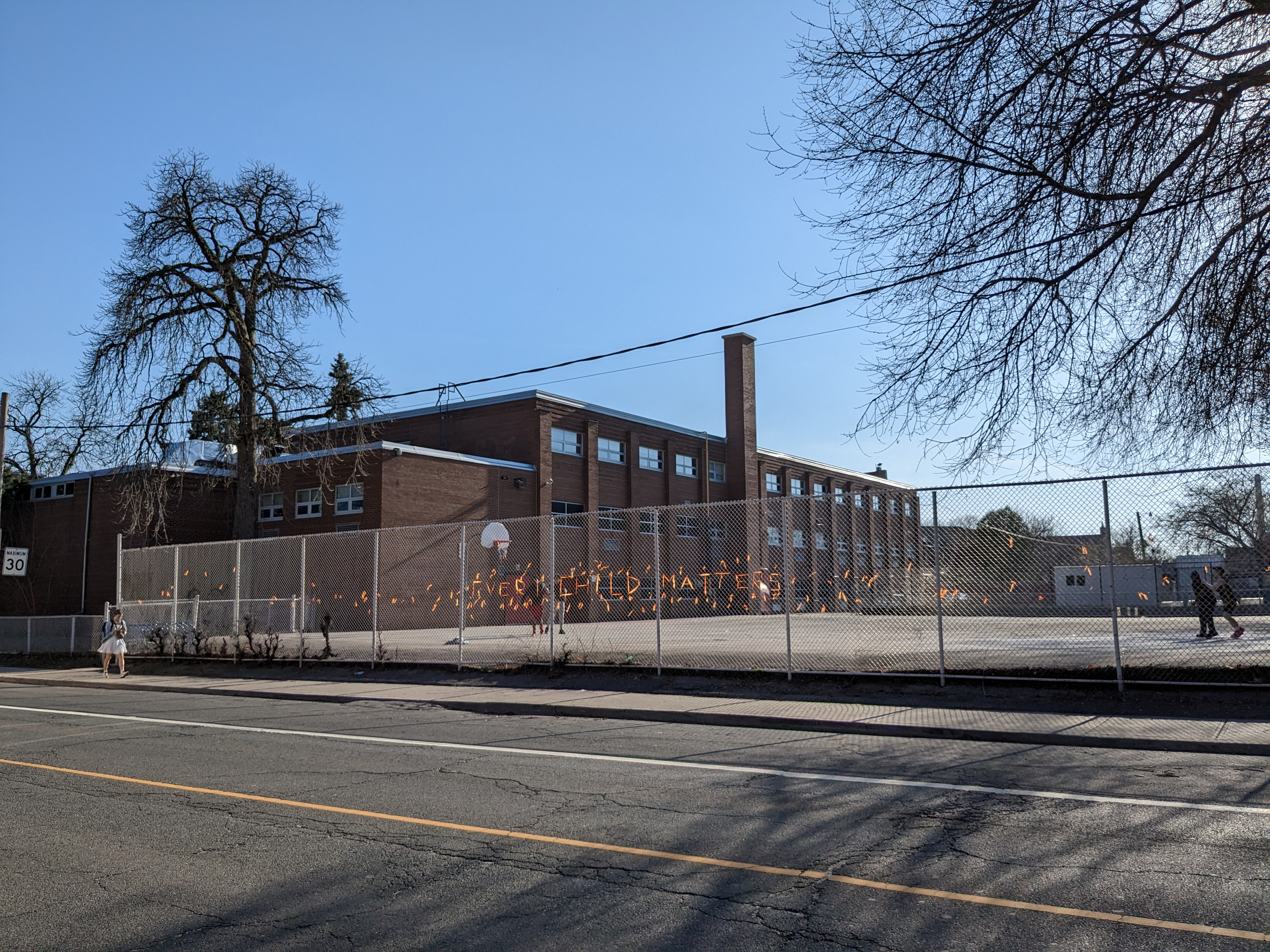
The original St. Patrick school on 70 D'Arcy Street. It was used as an elementary school from 1967 to 1983 and as a secondary school from 1986 to 1989.

One of Toronto's oldest Catholic schools, St. Patrick was founded as an elementary school on St. Patrick Market St. in downtown Toronto in 1852 during the introduction of publicly funded education in Canada. At first a primarily Irish school, St. Patrick (patron of Ireland) and St. Marguerite Bourgeoys (a French Canadian) were chosen as the patrons. The school location changed places to Dummer St. to Caerhowel St. to 174 Beverly a 3-story school dubbed during a period as an open air school due to the large balcony facing Beverly which was used to for exposure to the sun for the health of specific students. In 1967 a new school building was started to the south of the old building at 70 D'Arcy St. completed by the September 1968 school season, replacing a former Jewish Orthodox school that was torn down. The old building was used by a private catholic school as a temporary building while waiting for theirs to be built. The elementary school closed in 1983 and was re-opened as a secondary school in 1986 under the leadership of the first principal Sr. Lucille Corrigan, a former principal at Notre Dame High School.

With the extension of public funding of Catholic education to secondary schools, St. Patrick became a secondary school and the Metropolitan Separate School Board (now the Toronto Catholic District School Board) began to search for a new site. The school opened as a result of students cannot be accommodated at Brother Edmund Rice, De La Salle, St. Mary's and St. Joseph College due to lack of space for portable classrooms. Initially, it served the population bordered between south central Toronto, an area south of Dupont Street, west of the Don Valley Parkway and east of Ossington Avenue.

In 1989, during a period of reorganization by the Toronto Board of Education, Lakeview Secondary School, in a new building on the site of a former quarry at 49 Felstead Avenue in Toronto's east end, was closed due to low enrolment and the property was turned over to the MSSB (Metropolitan Separate School Board, now known as TCDSB) to be the new site for St. Patrick. The school has a large feeder area, serving Catholics from almost all of the former City of Toronto's east end.

== Centre for the Arts, Media, and Technology ==
In June 2010, St. Patrick was chosen to be a grade 9-12 Arts, Media and Technologies Centre by TCDSB and designated in February 2011 in an attempt to put the limits on enrolment sitting fewer than 500-600 students with the school below capacity, while nearby schools such as Neil McNeil and Notre Dame are overcrowded. This program has since started in September 2011. The Arts focus on Dance, Drama, Music (vocal, band & guitar), & Visual Arts would require admission to the program is by audition (guitar, vocal, instrumental music) and workshop (dance, drama and visual arts). Technology & Media Studies programs do not require any additional applications.

== See also ==
- Education in Ontario
- List of secondary schools in Ontario
