= École secondaire Toronto Ouest =

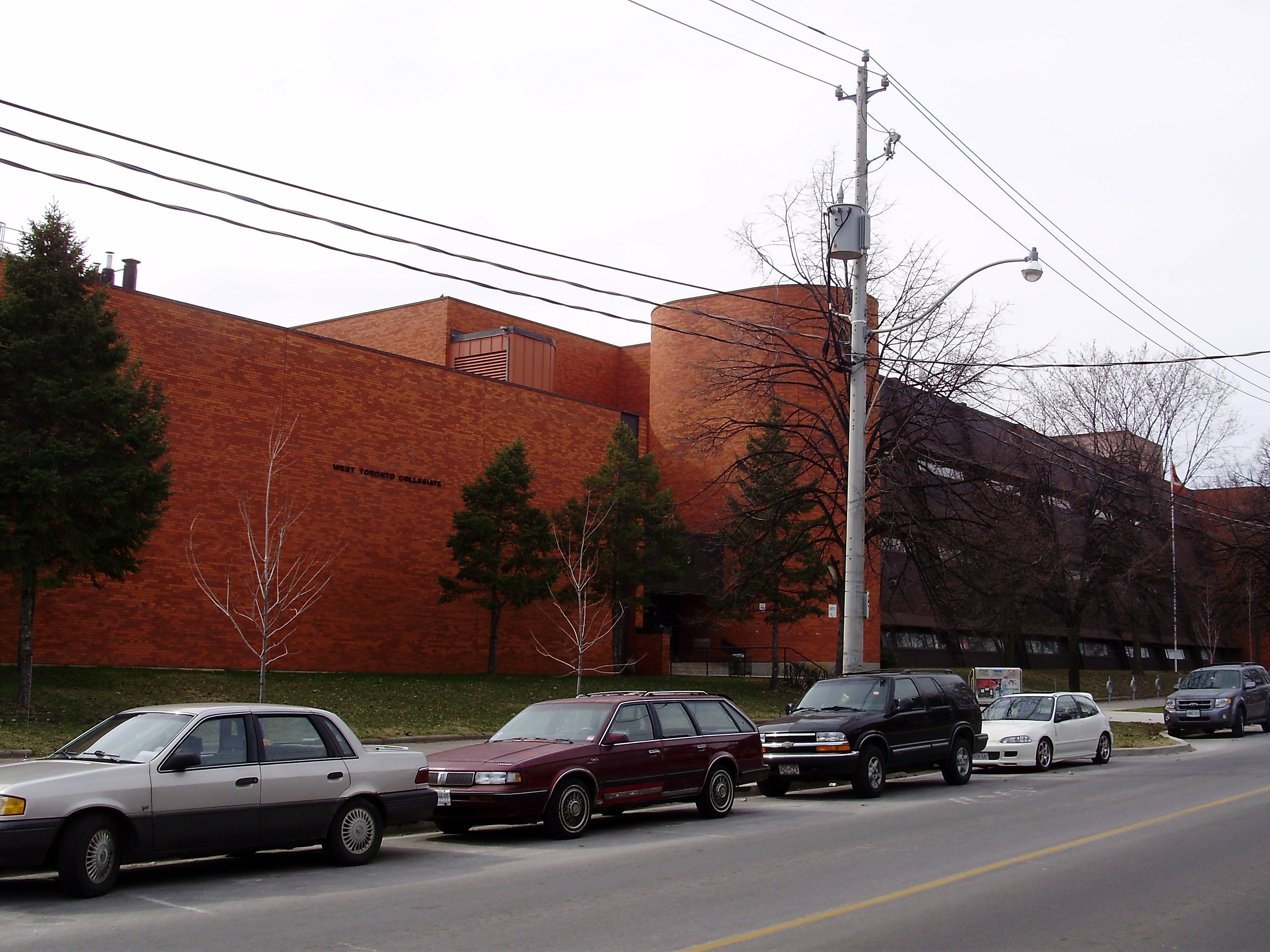

Location
- 330 Lansdowne Avenue; Brockton Village, Toronto, Ontario, M6H 3Y1; Canada; 43.652197°N 79.441018°W

Information
- School type: Public, High school
- Religious affiliation: Secular
- Established: 2012
- School board: Conseil scolaire Viamonde
- Superintendent: Isabelle Turcotte
- Area trustee: Geneviève Oger
- School number: 952803
- Principal: El Kerri, Nabil (par intérim)
- Grades: 7–12
- Language: French
- Website: ecolesecondairetorontoouest.csviamonde.ca

École secondaire Toronto Ouest is a public French-language high school in Toronto, Ontario, Canada. The school is operated by the Conseil scolaire Viamonde. It occupies part of the former West Toronto Collegiate building, which it shares with École secondaire catholique Saint-Frère-André, a French-language Roman Catholic high school operated by the Conseil scolaire catholique MonAvenir.

== Location ==
In 2011, the Conseil scolaire Viamonde and the Conseil scolaire catholique MonAvenir jointly bought the building at 330 Lansdowne Avenue, previously West Toronto Collegiate, from the Toronto District School Board. After renovations, the school boards began operating their respective schools in the building in September of 2012. The building is also home to the local francophone radio station Choq-FM 105.1.

== Programs ==
École secondaire Toronto Ouest offers an IB program and Special High Skills Major programs in arts and culture, sports, and hospitality and tourism.

== In the media ==
The third season of the reality television show Comment devenir adulte followed two students from École secondaire Toronto Ouest.

== See also ==
- Education in Ontario
- List of secondary schools in Ontario
