= West Park Secondary School =

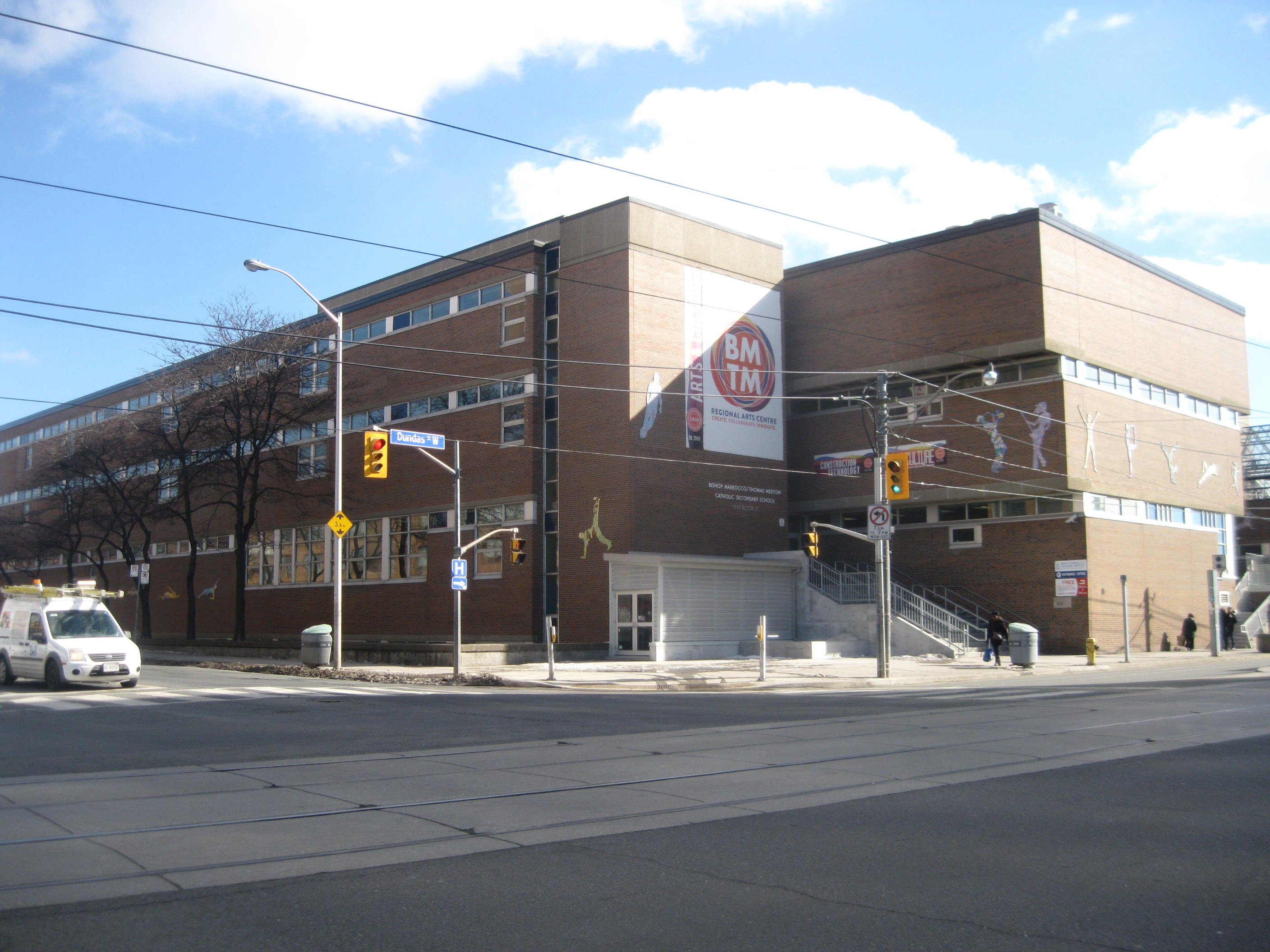

Location
- 1515 Bloor Street West; Roncesvalles, Toronto, Ontario, M6P 1A3; Canada; 43°39′23″N 79°27′04″W

Information
- School type: Public High School; Vocational High School
- Religious affiliation: Secular
- Founded: 1968
- Status: Leased out
- Closed: 1988
- School board: Toronto District School Board (Toronto Board of Education)
- Oversight: Toronto Lands Corporation
- Superintendent: Sandy Spyropoulos; LC4, Executive Superintendent; Sandra Tondat; LN19
- Area trustee: Robin Pilkey; Ward 7
- School number: 951765
- Principal: Ronald Kendall
- Grades: 9-13
- Enrollment: 1158
- Language: English
- Schedule type: Semestered
- Colours: Brown, Orange and White
- Team name: West Park Vikings
- Public transit access: TTC: North/South: 40 Junction; West/East: 504 King; Rapid Transit: Dundas West

West Park Secondary School (WPSS, West Park), originally known as West Park Vocational School is a Toronto District School Board public high school facility that operated as a regular school from 1968 to 1988 by the Toronto Board of Education from grade 9 to 13. The school offered various vocational and academic courses in the spacious four-storey school building for inner city schools. The property remains under TDSB possession as of 2019 as a holding school.

== History ==
In 1985, Cathy McPherson, the coordinator of the PUSH Central Region, stated that West Park and five other schools were listed as having "excellent" access for disabled persons by the Toronto Board of Education continuing education program.

Decrease in enrollment had the Toronto Board of Education announced in 1986 that it planned to close the West Park facility by 1988. Irene Atkinson, the trustee of Ward 2, said in 1986 that it would likely be the first Toronto (Old Toronto) school closed due to declining enrollment. A task force recommended that the student body is transferred to Brockton High School. That year, the Toronto Star wrote that West Park students were expected to be transferred to Brockton. The Metropolitan Separate School Board (now the Toronto Catholic District School Board) offered to take over the campus and make it into a Roman Catholic separate school. The MSSB's Bishop Francis Marrocco Catholic High School on St. Clair/Dufferin area was over capacity, and the separate school board wanted additional space. There was a proposal stating that both public secular and public separate schools could share the same building.

On January 7, 1988, Ned McKeown, the director of the TBE, recommended that West Park be transferred to the MSSB. On March 7, 1988, the MSSB accepted taking the West Park facility. Sandro Contenta of the Toronto Star stated that the TBE was not willing to pay the funds to make the West Park building shareable between the two school boards. The transfer became effective July 1, 1988. Afterwards, the programs at West Park were dispersed at Bickford Park High School (12 classrooms), Brockton High School (3 shops), Castle Frank High School (special education), Central High School of Commerce (special education) and Western Technical-Commercial School (auto shop renovations).

It was reopened as Bishop Marrocco/Thomas Merton Catholic Secondary School in September 1988, which they were once called Bishop Francis Marrocco Catholic High School (opened in 1986) and St. Joseph Commercial School (founded by the Sisters of St. Joseph in 1880 and was renamed to Thomas Merton C.S.S. in 1985).

In 2017, Choice Properties REIT proposed to redevelop the property adjacent to the West Park site, although a replacement school is not ruled out.

== See also ==
- List of high schools in Ontario
- Bishop Marrocco/Thomas Merton Catholic Secondary School
