= Bishop Marrocco/Thomas Merton Catholic Secondary School =

Catholic high school in Toronto, Canada

Bishop Marrocco/Thomas Merton Catholic Secondary School and Regional Arts Centre
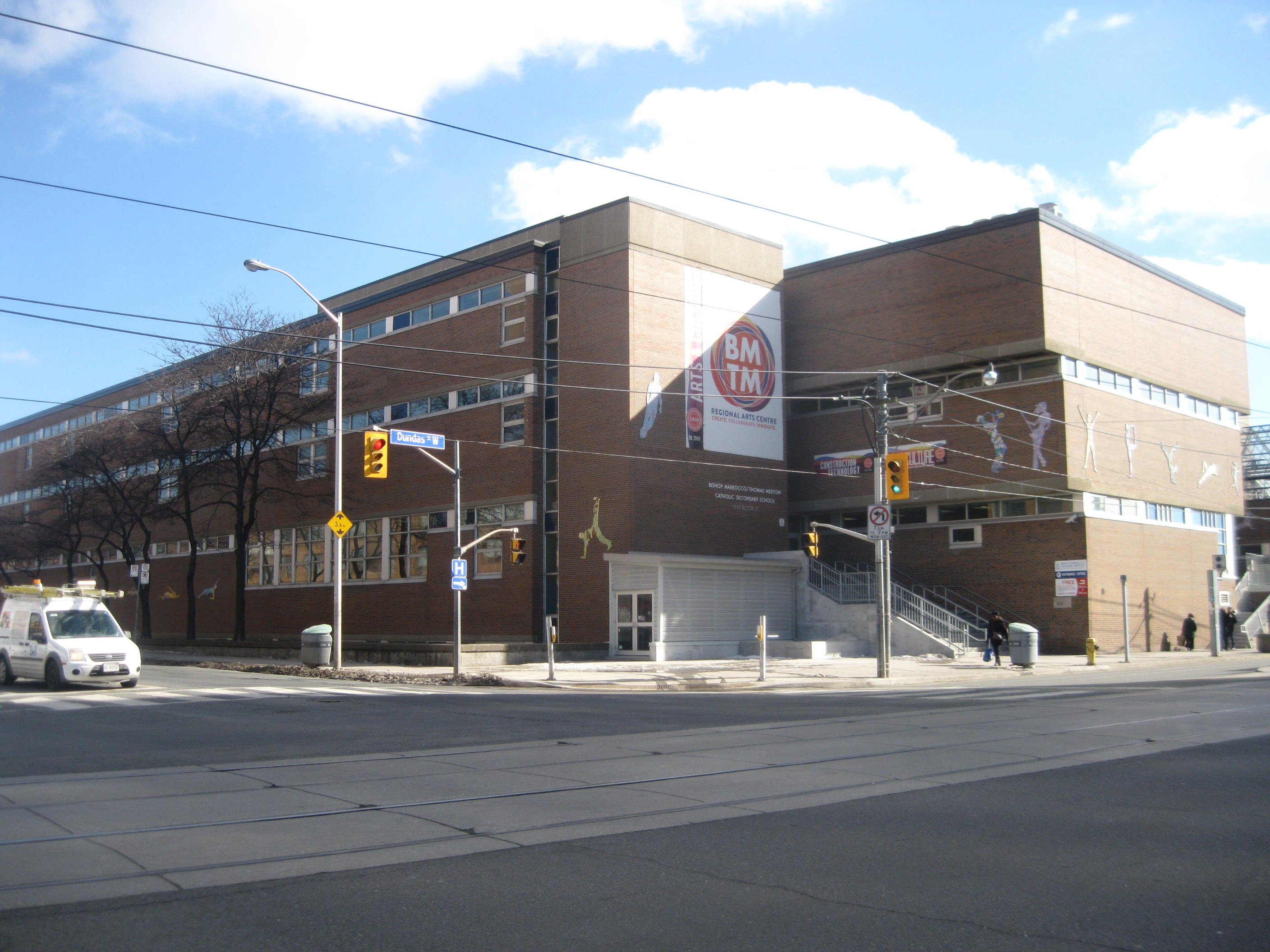
- Bishop Marrocco/Thomas Merton Catholic Secondary School in the former West Park S.S. building.

Location
- 1515 Bloor Street West; Roncesvalles, Toronto, Ontario, M6P 1A3; Canada; 43°39′23″N 79°27′04″W

Information
- Former name: St. Joseph High School (1880–1957); St. Joseph Commercial School (1957–1985); Thomas Merton Catholic Secondary School (1985–1988); Bishop Francis Marrocco Catholic Secondary School (1986–1988) West Park Secondary School
- School type: Catholic Secondary school Art school
- Motto: Growth Through Faith Congregavit nos in unum Christi amor (The love of Christ has gathered us together into one)
- Religious affiliations: Roman Catholic (Sisters of St. Joseph)
- Established: 1880 (St. Joseph Commercial School); 1986 (Bishop Francis Marrocco High School)
- School board: Toronto Catholic District School Board (Metropolitan Separate School Board)
- Superintendent: Mr. George Danfulani; Area 5
- Area trustee: Teresa Lubinski; Ward 4
- School number: 545 / 691798
- Principal: Laila Velocci
- Vice Principal: Kathleen Wong; Rob McGarrigle
- Grades: 9–12
- Enrolment: 710 (2025-2026)
- Colors: Royal Blue and White
- Slogan: Create. Collaborate. Innovate. To Think. To Pray. To Serve.
- Team name: Marrocco/Merton Royals
- Specialist High Skills Major: Arts and Culture; Business; Transportation

Bishop Marrocco/Thomas Merton Catholic Secondary School, officially Bishop Marrocco/Thomas Merton Catholic Secondary School and Regional Arts Centre (referred to known as The Regional Arts School @ Marrocco, BMTMCSS, BMTM, Bishop Marrocco/Thomas Merton, or simply Marrocco/Merton) is a Catholic secondary school located in Toronto, Ontario, Canada part of the Toronto Catholic District School Board, formerly the Metropolitan Separate School Board and serves about 740 students in grades 9 to 12.

The school is a merger of two existing high schools. It was founded in 1880 as St. Joseph's Commercial School by the Sisters of St. Joseph and was renamed to Thomas Merton Catholic Secondary School in honour of the American monk Thomas Merton and in 1986, the present school, Bishop Francis Marrocco Catholic Secondary School was established, though the latter was named after Auxiliary Bishop Francis Marrocco and in 1988, the two schools merged. The present high school is housed in the former West Park Secondary School, opened in 1968 by the Toronto Board of Education, currently owned by the Toronto District School Board in which the campus is leased since 1988. The motto for Bishop Marrocco/Thomas Merton is "Growth Through Faith"

== History ==
One of the oldest catholic secondary schools in Toronto, Bishop Marrocco/Thomas Merton began as two schools. In 1880, the Sisters of St. Joseph established St. Joseph's High School, whose roots dated back to 1854 with the founding of St. Joseph's Academy for Young Ladies. The school was renamed to St. Joseph Commercial School as an all-girls commercial school in the Cabbagetown area in 1957.

From the beginning, this school was a satellite campus of St. Joseph College Wellesley for its purpose to teach younger women secretarial skills. Grades 9 and 10 were taught in the Linden building while Grades 11 and 12 were assigned to the Sacre Coeur school on Sherbourne although the students in these grades operated under the SJCS-Wellesley banner. After 1975, the school began to admit male students and the St. Joseph Commercial became a co-educational School. As a result, the school began to search for a new name and in 1985, St. Joseph Commercial was formally renamed again to Thomas Merton Catholic Secondary School.

The present day school, known as Bishop Francis Marrocco was officially established by the Metropolitan Separate School Board on September 2, 1986, using the facilities of Richard W. Scott Catholic Elementary School in the St. Clair/Dufferin area. The namesake, Francis Marrocco was a Toronto Auxiliary Bishop of Italian descent who worked with Archbishop Pocock in the Archdiocese of Toronto's great efforts in the 1960s to extend the availability of Roman Catholic secondary education and was known for helping immigrants adjust to their new life in Canada.

The Marrocco and Merton schools were consolidated in September 1988 in the former West Park Secondary School in the Bloor/Dundas area, which was closed due to low enrolment and the property was ceded over to the MSSB as the new site of the school. The original school consisted of Michael Monk as the first principal, 250 Marrocco students, 500 Merton students and 350 new grade 9 Marrocco/Merton students totaling to 1100 students.

The arts program began in 2004 and the Arts and Culture High Skills program was launched in 2010.

=== Possible closure or relocation ===
In 2017, Choice Properties REIT proposed to redevelop the property adjacent to the West Park site, although a replacement school is not ruled out. The TDSB, the owner of the West Park property, proposed that the former school site is to be redeveloped into a residential property.

== Overview ==
The school has a diverse community of Portuguese, Central American, Ukrainian, Polish, Lithuanian and Filipino descent. It offers a diverse curriculum for students who want to pursue post-secondary education, apprenticeships and trades and gain skills for the world of work. A wide range of athletics (Marrocco/Merton Royals) and extra-curricular activities such as school band, dramatic productions, recording studio, video production, automotive competitions. It also offers special ESL (English as a Second Language) classes.

As an inner city high school, Marrocco-Merton's facility was built in 1968 as West Park Vocational School, designed by Abram and Ingleson Architects as a four-storey high school features a double gymnasium, a tailoring shop, a chapel, an olympic-size swimming pool, a 700-seat amphitheatre-style auditorium, and a football/soccer field on top of a parking garage.

== Highlights ==
Regional Arts Centre (RAC) • Congregated Advanced Placement (CAP) • Specialist High Skills Major (SHSM)- Arts & Culture, Business, Transportation • S.T.A.R.S. Program (Student Training to Acquire Real Life Skills Program) for students in the ME/DD Program • Cooperative Education Learning, including the Ontario Youth Apprenticeship Program (OYAP) • Wireless Digital Labs, Digital Sound Recording Studio, Photography Darkroom, Digital Video Production Lab, 500-person Theatre, Science Labs, a Greenhouse, two technical Design Labs and Transportation Labs, Fitness Facility, and Swimming Pool. • Comprehensive leadership, co-curricular and athletic programs. • Integrated Resource Support Program • Grade 9 Summer School Transition Program for incoming Grade 9 students who can earn a high school credit towards their OSSD.

== Feeder Schools ==
- St. Helen's Catholic Elementary School
- Holy Family Catholic Elementary School
- St. Vincent de Paul Catholic Elementary School
- St. Rita Catholic Elementary School
- James Culnan Catholic School
- St. Mary of the Angels
- St. Clare Catholic Elementary School

== See also ==
- Education in Ontario
- List of secondary schools in Ontario
- West Park Secondary School
