= West Toronto Collegiate Institute =

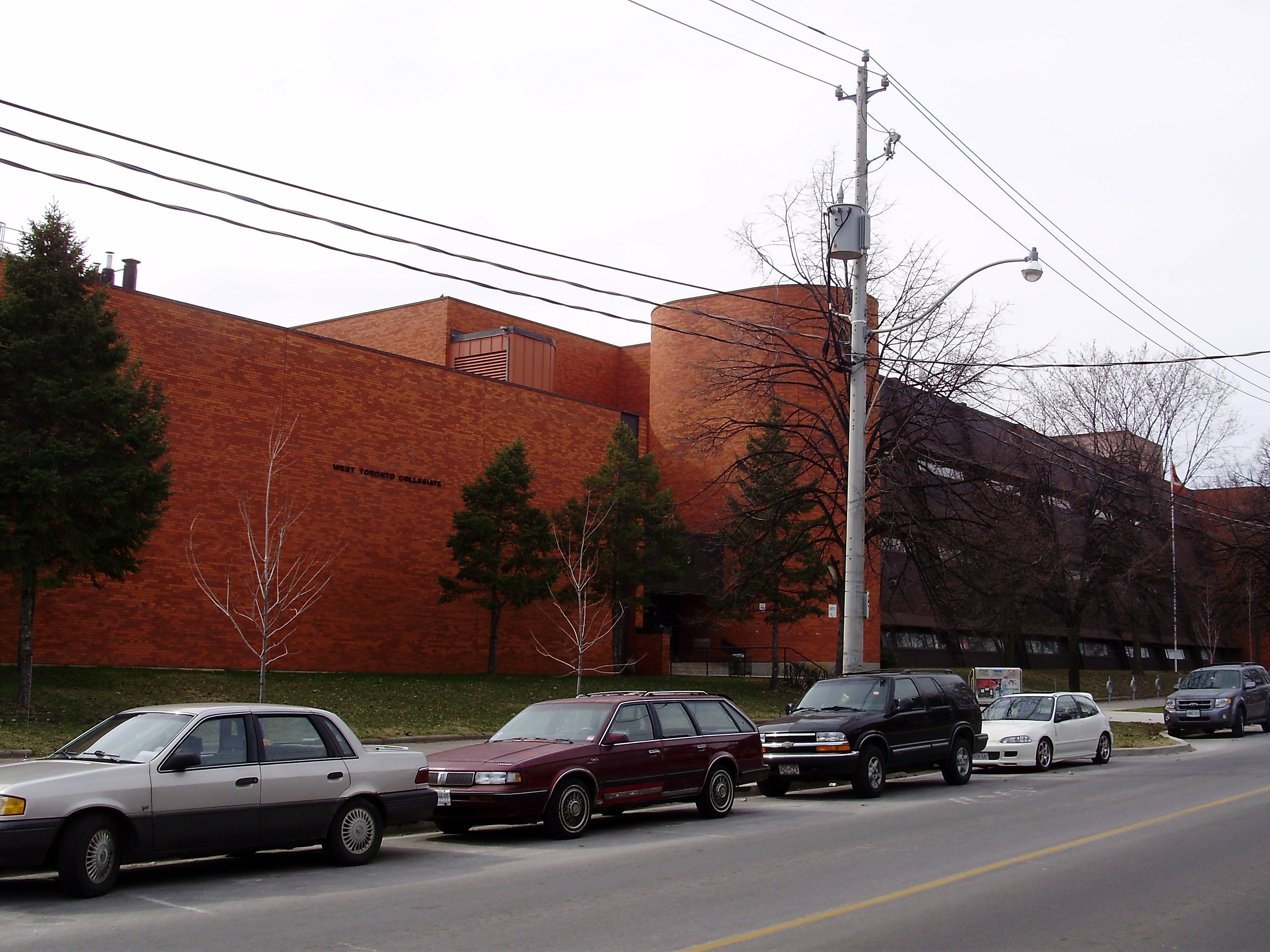

Location
- 330 Lansdowne Avenue; Toronto, Ontario, M6H 3Y1; Canada; 43.652197°N 79.441018°W

Information
- School type: Public High school
- Founded: 1972
- Status: Now jointly owned by CSC MonAvenir and CS Viamonde
- Closed: 2010
- School board: Toronto District School Board (Toronto Board of Education)
- School number: 5850 / 951447
- Grades: 9-13
- Enrollment: 376 (2009-10)
- Language: English
- Schedule type: semestered
- Colours: Black, Yellow and White
- Team name: West Toronto Warriors

West Toronto Collegiate Institute (WTCI, West Toronto) is a former public high school in the Brockton Village neighbourhood in Toronto, Ontario, Canada from 1972–2010. It is located at 330 Lansdowne Avenue, just north of College Street. It was owned and operated by the Toronto District School Board (TDSB) and previously by the Toronto Board of Education. The TDSB transferred ownership of West Toronto Collegiate Institute to Conseil scolaire Viamonde (CSV) and the Conseil scolaire de district catholique Centre-Sud (CSDCCS) in October 2011.

== History ==
West Toronto was constructed and opened in 1972 by the Toronto Board of Education. The school was built on the former southern section of MacGregor Park. The football field is the former location of a lumber yard. The actual site where the school stands used to be an old Eaton's Delivery Truck Depot. And where the tennis courts are, near St. Helen's, stood an old company named J.B. Smith's & Sons. Occasionally in the summer, a travelling circus/ Carnival would set up where the football field is. The construction of the school necessitated the closing of the section alongside the school of St. Helen's Avenue. The siding of the building on the east and west sides of the building is unique. It was installed as "raw" steel and allowed to rust to reach the intended brown colour, then preserved. The school was originally named in 1972, by its students as West Toronto Secondary School. This was subsequently changed.

The school, along with Monarch Park Collegiate, started its 'Steps to University' program to encourage the entry of high school students into university in 1992. Students could earn both high school and university credits in sociology while attending West Toronto. That September of the same year, an area mall began housing an area which served as the location of West Toronto Secondary's satellite campus for the co-operative education program and the re-entry program for older students at Brockton High School.

In July 2009, it was announced that the grade nine classes for the 2009-10 school year were cancelled due to a lack of students applying to the school. The school, facing a decline in enrollment since 2004, had to cancel programs and courses. The operation of the school and its programs then became the subject of a TDSB Accommodation Review Committee (ARC) review. In August 2009, George Brown College expressed interest in leasing a floor of the school.

On October 1, 2009, teacher Maria Campodonico was named the winner of the first-ever Toronto Star Teacher Award. Campodonico came to Canada from Colombia when she was 13. She later graduated from York and University of Western Ontario's faculty of education, and was president of the board of directors of the Spanish-Speaking Education Network for four months. When she arrived at West Toronto in 2005, she started implementing what would become an award-winning breakfast program after seeing the number of kids who went hungry. She knocked on the doors of local businesses, including local supermarkets, soliciting food and donations. It also became a vehicle for teens to start collecting perishable items to send to impoverished nations.

The Accommodation Review Committee recommended in November 2009 the permanent closure of West Toronto Collegiate effective August 31, 2010. The committee further recommended that the building remain in the possession of the school board for education purposes. West Toronto students transferred to other schools for the 2010-11 school year and the site was transferred to Toronto Land Corporation for sale. The TLC transferred ownership of West Toronto Collegiate Institute to Conseil scolaire Viamonde and the Conseil scolaire de district catholique Centre-Sud (CSDCCS) in October 2011. The school boards paid $20.5 million for the property.

The building re-opened in September 2012, as two schools, shared by the two French boards, as École secondaire catholique Saint-Frère-André and École secondaire Toronto Ouest. Renovations removed the swimming pool. The TDSB uses some floor space on the third floor.

== Notable alumni ==
- Ana Bailao - Canadian politician, City of Toronto
- John Bortolotti - Director/Producer
- Professor Roberto Botelho - Accomplished cell biologist
- Charmaine Crooks - Olympic athlete
- Marianna Martyniuk, Fiction writer
- Kardinal Offishall, Canadian rapper

== See also ==
- List of high schools in Ontario
