= École secondaire catholique Saint-Frère-André =

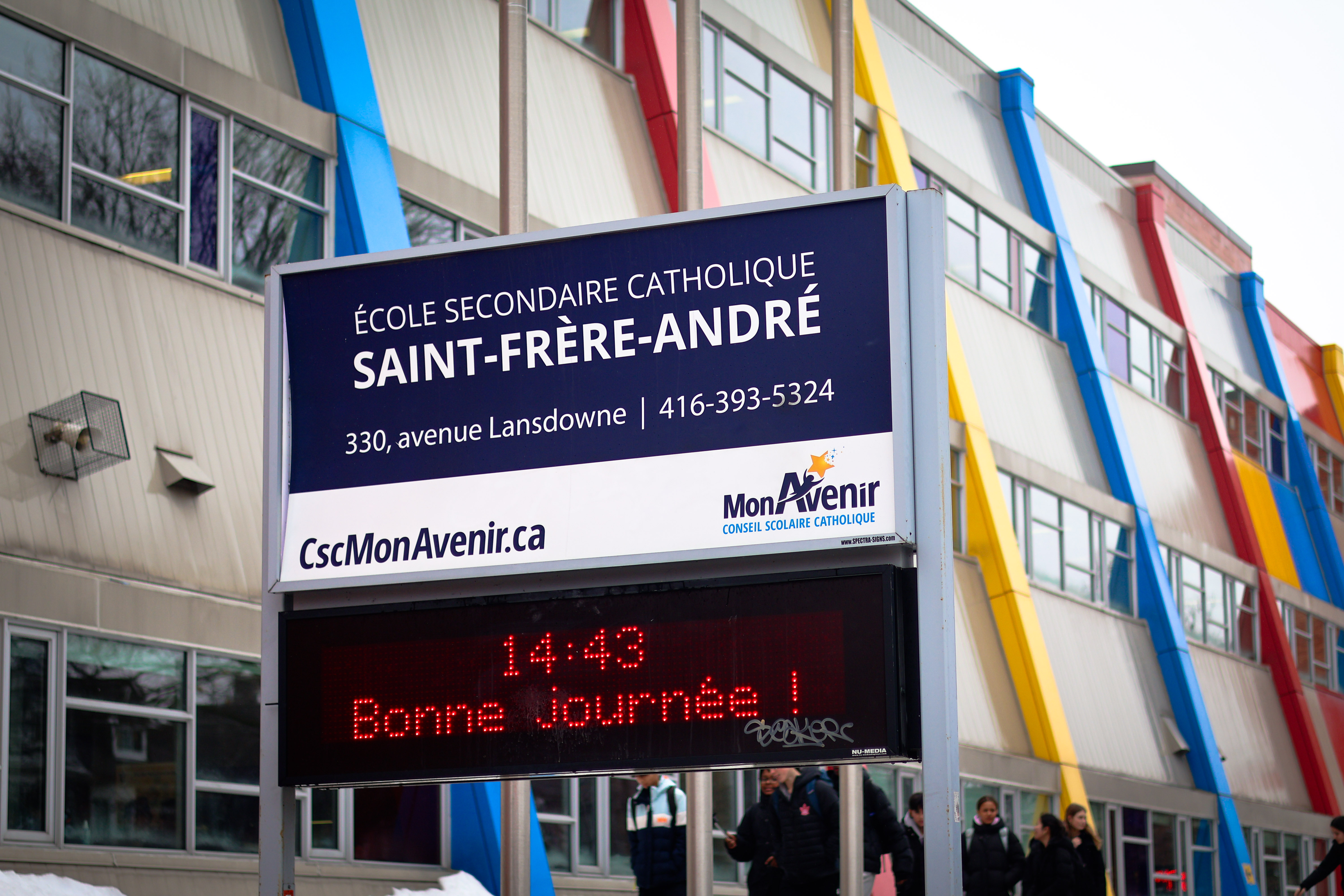
- Main sign of ÉSC Saint-Frère-André, with Toronto-Ouest in the background.

Location
- 330 Lansdowne Avenue; Toronto, Ontario, M6H 3Y1; Canada; 43.652197°N 79.441018°W

Information
- School type: Catholic, High school
- Motto: L'élève au cœur de l'excellence (Students at the heart of excellence)
- Religious affiliation: Roman Catholic
- Patron saint: St. Brother André Bessette
- Founded: 2012
- School board: Conseil scolaire catholique MonAvenir
- Superintendent: Frédéric Bergeron
- Area trustee: Nathalie Dufour-Séguin and Rhea Dechaine
- School number: 691950
- Principal: Enselme Kengne
- Grades: 7–12
- Language: French
- Website: essfa.cscmonavenir.ca

École secondaire catholique Saint-Frère-André is a French-language Roman Catholic high school in Toronto, Ontario, Canada. The school serves students in Grades 7 through 12 and is operated by the Conseil scolaire catholique MonAvenir, the public French-Catholic school board serving Central and Southwestern Ontario.

== History ==
In 2011, the property where Saint-Frère-André is presently situated was acquired from the Toronto District School Board by the Conseil scolaire catholique MonAvenir and the Conseil scolaire Viamonde. The school is located in the former West Toronto Collegiate Institute building, situated near the intersection of Lansdowne Avenue and College Street in Toronto's west end. It occupies part of the former West Toronto Collegiate building.

The school was opened in September 2012 to respond to the growing need for French-language Catholic secondary education in the Greater Toronto Area. The building is shared with École secondaire Toronto Ouest, a public French-language high school operated by the Conseil scolaire Viamonde.

The inaugauration of the school was celebrated in February, 2013. During the celebrations, the school was blessed by the cardinal Thomas Collins.

It was named in honour of Saint Frère André (Brother André Bessette), a Roman Catholic religious brother of the Congregation of Holy Cross who was canonized in 2010 for his dedication to faith, healing, and community service.

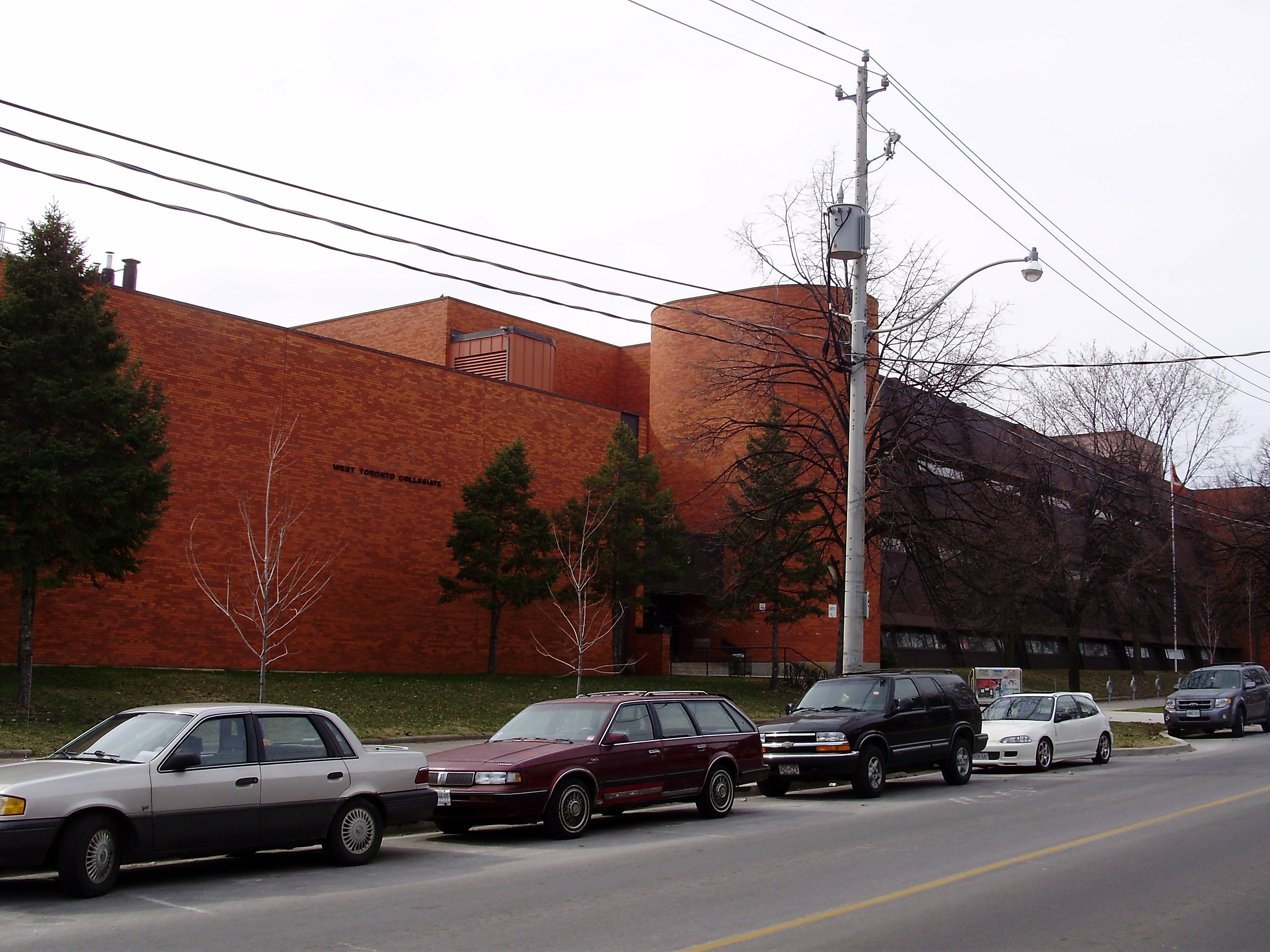
West Toronto Collegiate, former occupant of the building before ÉSC Saint-Frère-André (2009)

During the school's first year of operation, it taught 150 students between Grades 7 and 11. The school expanding to Grades 7 to 12 in the following year.

== Programs ==
The school offers the Specialist High Skills Major (SHSM) in Business and Manufacturing as of 2025.

École secondaire catholique Saint-Frère-André has offered the International Baccalaureate (IB) Diploma Programme to students in Grades 11 and 12 since 2014.

== See also ==
- Education in Ontario
- List of secondary schools in Ontario
