= Bloordale Beach =

Guerilla art installation and community hub

- Interactive map of Bloordale Beach
- Type: Informally created
- Location: Brockton High School grounds
- Coordinates: 43.658129°N 79.437958°W

Bloordale Beach was an informal community hub in Bloordale Village, a community in the west end of Toronto. Since it was landlocked, the beach was described as "Toronto's only waterless beach".

In January 2020, the demolition of Brockton High School resulted in a 118,400 sq ft lot of sand and gravel. Neighbours removed sections of the fence in order to open up the Toronto District School Board's property for use as a public space. Though no body of water existed on the site, visitors put up humorous signs naming it Bloordale Beach, promoting rip current and shark safety, and welcoming beachgoers.

The beach came to a close in September 2021 when construction of the new Bloor Collegiate Institute began on the site.

== Usage ==
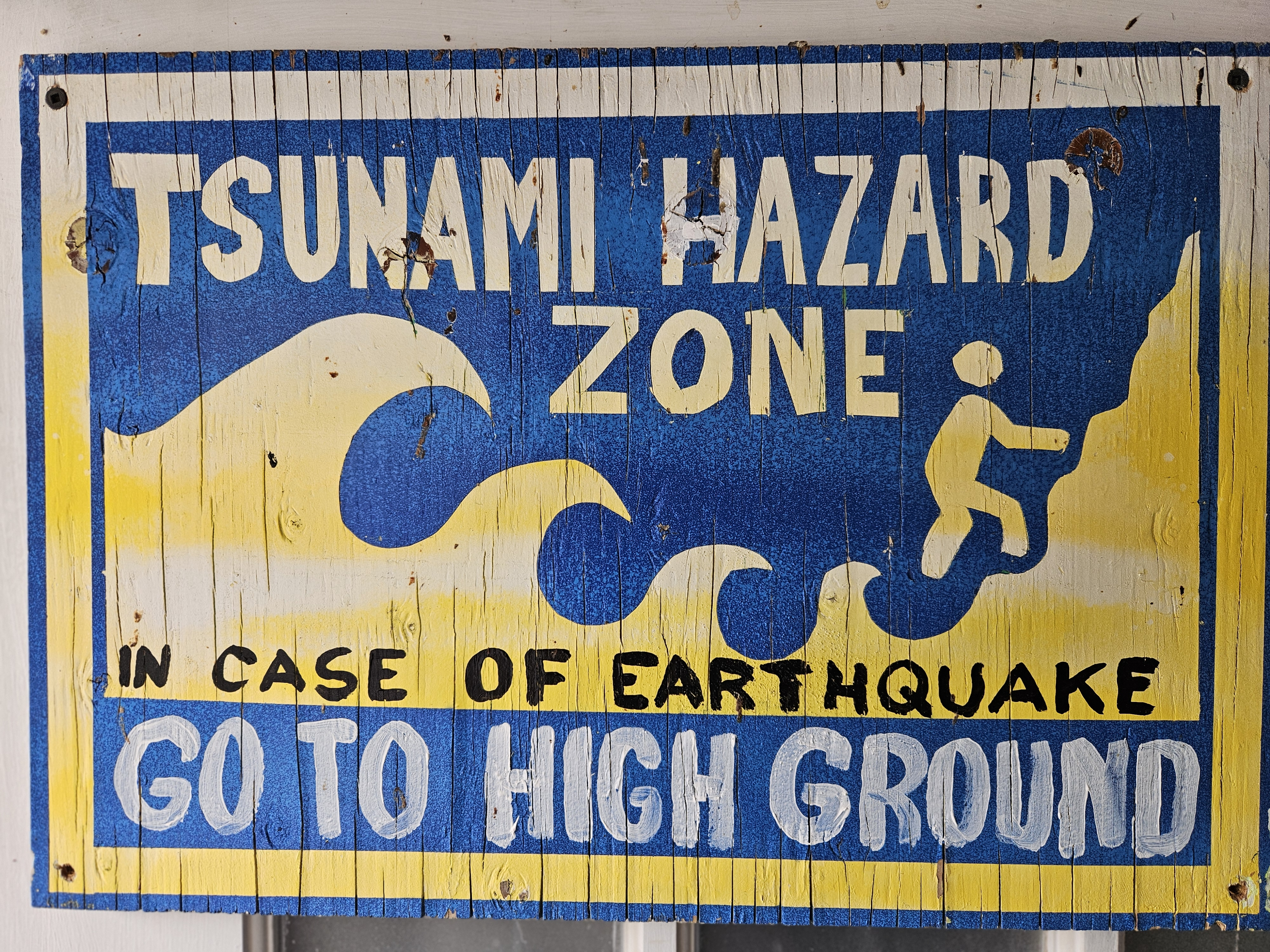
A sign from Bloordale Beach

Bloordale Beach opened on 25 May 2020, located north of the Dufferin Mall between Croatia Street and Brock Crescent.

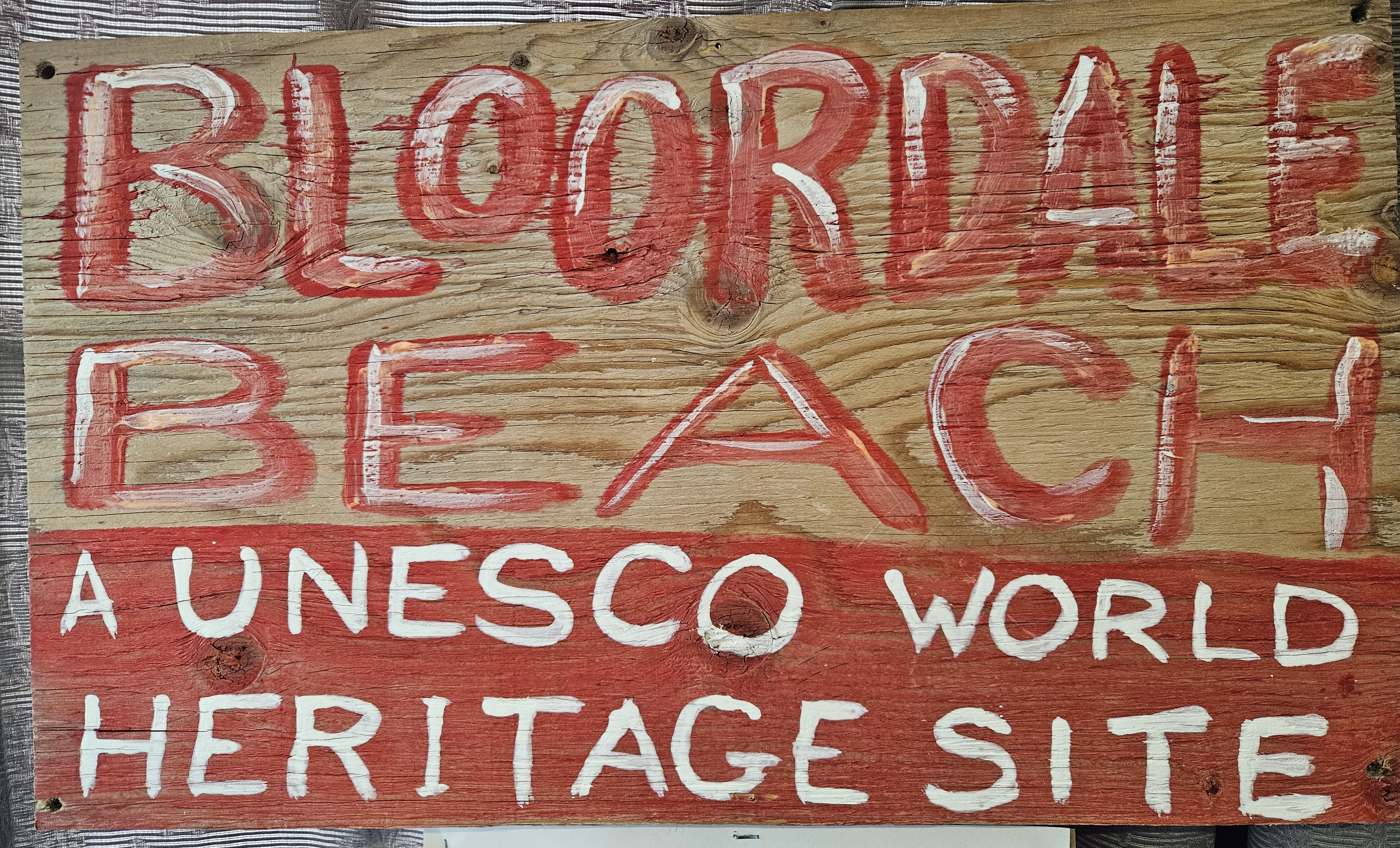
A sign from Bloordale Beach falsely claimed it was a UNESCO World Heritage Site.

Public facilities included a dog gymnasium (officially called the Barkour Area), a "sea turtle nesting area," Bloordale Lagoon (essentially a large puddle that would form after heavy rainfall), a community garden, and occasional temporary art installations.

Bloordale Beach was used as a community hub, a gathering place, an open air art gallery, a destination for sunbathers, and a thoroughfare shortcut to nearby Dufferin Mall.

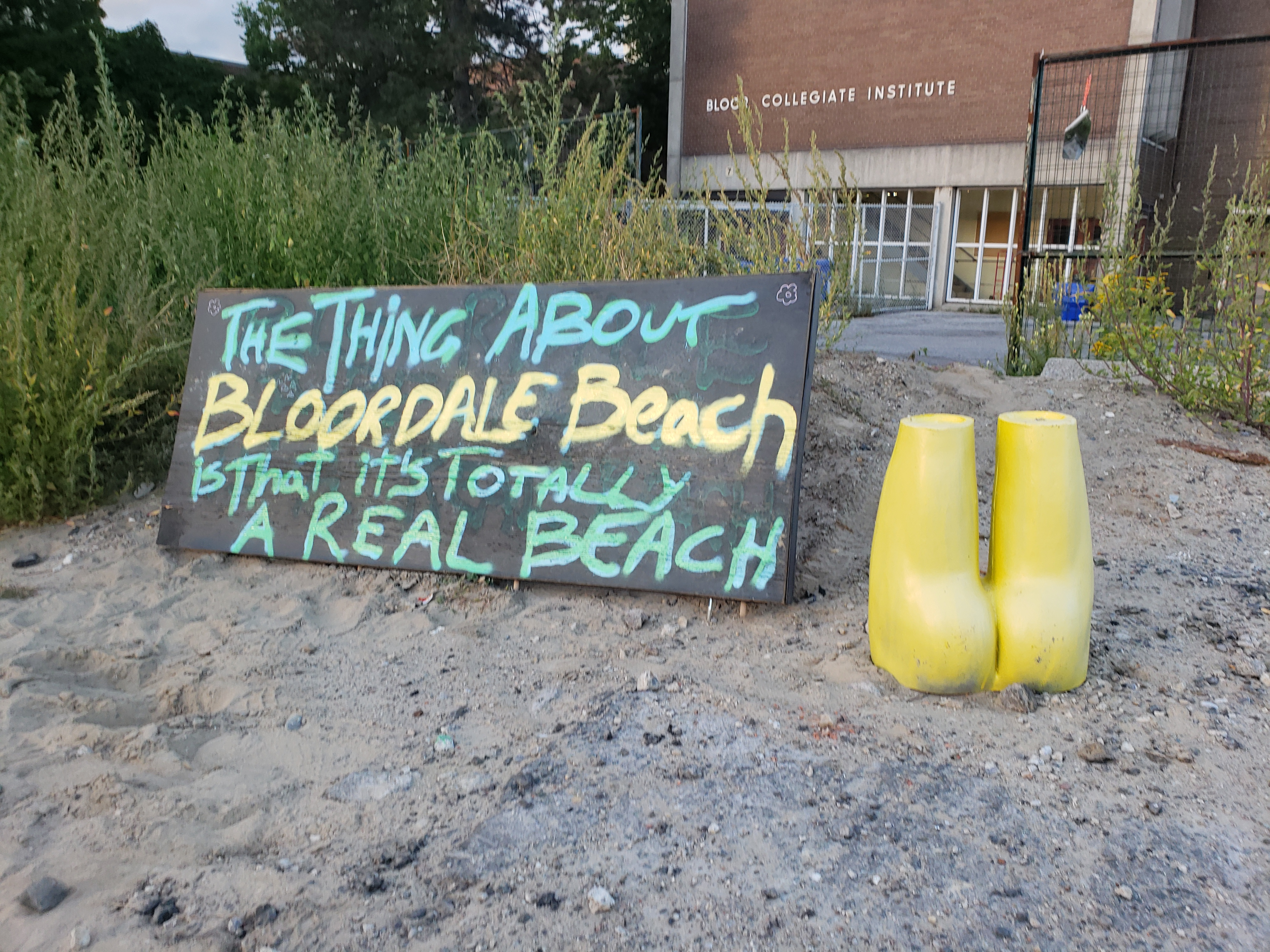
Another sign from Bloordale Beach.

The beach finally closed on Sept 23, 2021, and construction of the new Bloor Collegiate building commenced. Construction of the new high school was completed in 2025.

== Critical reception ==
Bloordale Beach was described in The Toronto Star as Toronto's "newest hot summer destination."

Bloordale Beach was featured in the documentary More than a Beach by Elizabeth Littlejohn, documenting how countless people contributed signage, furniture, sculpture, artworks, and performance pieces to this beach during the pandemic. The documentary was nominated for the Heritage Toronto Public Space Award in 2025.

Bloordale Beach was featured in the short documentary Bloordale Beach by Beth Warrian where it was described as a vision for reclaiming public space.

== In popular culture ==
AUS!Funkt, Canadian art-rock band, paid homage to the beach in the video for their song "Set Yourself Free".
