= ALPHA Alternative School =

Public school in Toronto, Canada

Coordinates: 43.6457°N 79.3982°W

ALPHA Alternative School is an alternative public school in Toronto, Ontario, Canada. Founded in 1972, it is Toronto's oldest elementary alternative school. It was created by parents, and inspired in good part by the Ontario government's Hall-Dennis Report. ALPHA stands for "A lot of people hoping for an alternative." It is located downtown on Brant Street, near Adelaide St.

The school was started with no tests or grades. Behaviour rules were created and enforced by students and staff democratically.

== Background ==
ALPHA is based on a philosophy of "non-coercive, holistic, learner-centered education".

The original School site was located on the 3rd floor of the YMCA (open and in use) close to the intersection of Broadview and Gerrard Streets, a few minutes walk to the community of Riverdale.

== Reception ==
ALPHA was the focus of the Masters thesis Defining and Defending a Democratic Education Site, by Deb O'Rourke. The Journal of Unschooling and Alternative Learning published an article, Letting the Child Work, based on this thesis.

== Alpha II ==
Alpha II Alternative School is a student-directed senior elementary and secondary school for grades 7 to 12 located in Toronto. Part of the Toronto District School Board, Alpha II was founded in 2007 by a group of ALPHA parents. Students decide for themselves what to learn and how to learn it. School-wide decisions are made by a student-led weekly meeting where each person's voice counts in developing consensus.
