= The Student School =

Location
- 160 Glendonwynne Ave; Toronto, Ontario, M6P 0A5; Canada

Information
- School type: High school
- Founded: 1979
- Superintendent: Alison Gaymes San Vicente
- Area trustee: Debbie King
- Principal: Mark Koczij
- Grades: 11-12
- Enrolment: 36 (2021 - 2022)
- Language: English
- Area: High Park North
- Website: thestudentschool.org

The Student School is an alternative high school in the Toronto District School Board, founded in 1979 for people who had dropped out of high school to find work before graduating, mostly from general-level academic programmes. Finding that not having their high school diploma restricted their job opportunities, however, they now wished to return to earn it. In 1983 TSS changed its focus on drop-outs to also accepting transfers from other high schools.

The school started with 4 teachers and 64 students and was housed in the Eastdale Collegiate building. It then was moved to the Western Technical-Commercial School building, sharing the space with Western and Ursula Franklin Academy. It now has approximately 36 students and offers 11th and 12th grade academic courses.

== See also ==
- Education in Ontario
- List of secondary schools in Ontario
