= Toronto Board of Education =

Former school district in Canada

Board of Education for the City of Toronto (District 15)

Location
- 155 College Street; Toronto, Ontario, Canada; M5T 3M7

District information
- Established: 1904
- Closed: December 31, 1997
- Chair of the board: David Moll
- District ID: TBE

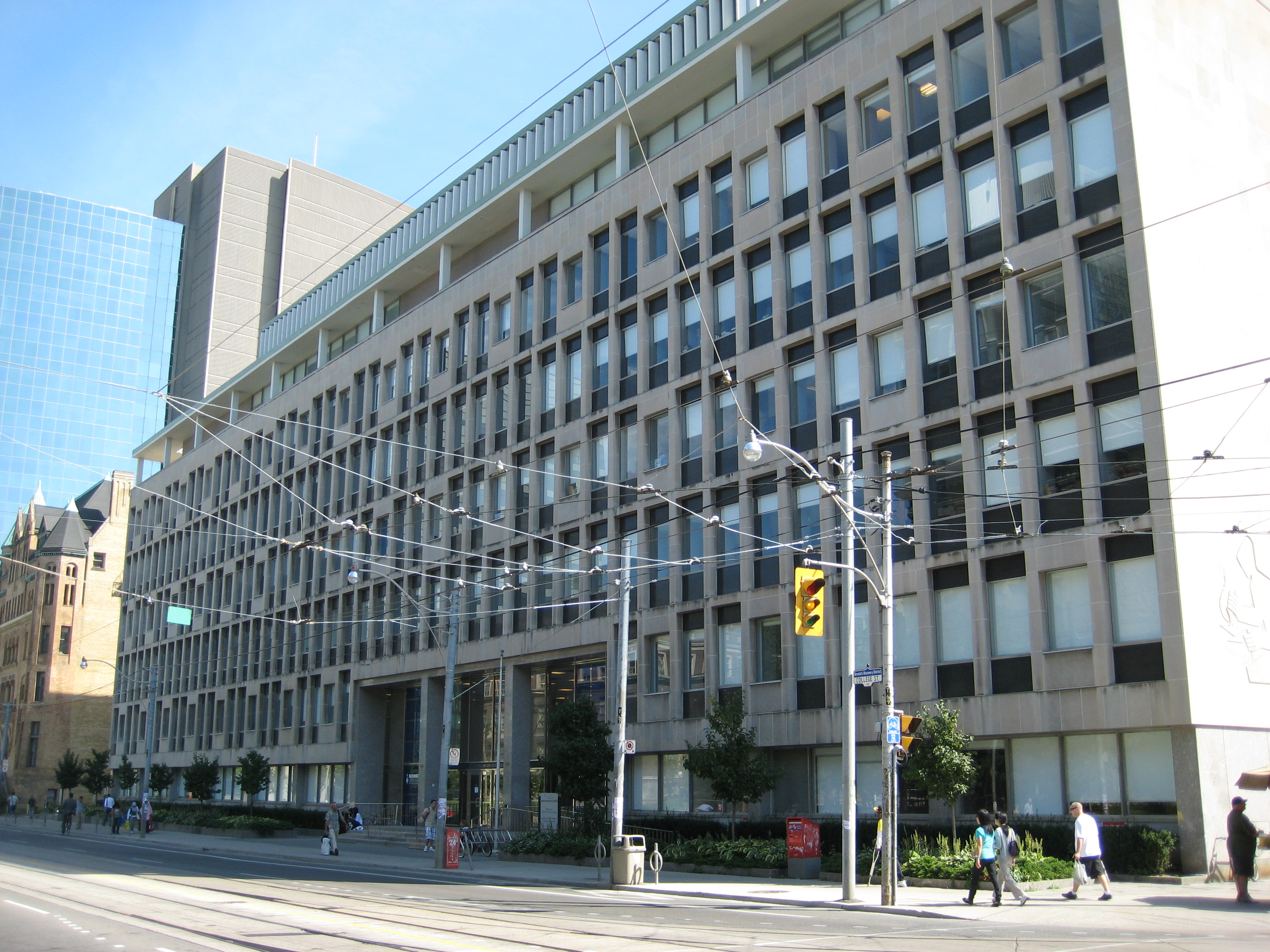
Former headquarters of the Toronto Board of Education, briefly used as the headquarters of the TDSB and now University of Toronto Health Sciences Building

The Toronto Board of Education (TBE; commonly known as School District 15), officially known as the Board of Education for the City of Toronto, is the former secular school district serving the pre-merged city of Toronto. The board offices were located at 155 College Street. Following a referendum in 1900, the Toronto Board of Education was created in 1904 from the merger of the Toronto Public School Board, the Collegiate Institute Board, and the Technical School Board.

As of December 1996, the TBE operated 169 schools and had over 4,800 teachers and principals and about 78,000 full-time students and over 250,000 continuing education and adult students.

At one time the board operated educational programs for Francophone students. The Conseil des écoles françaises de la communauté urbaine de Toronto (CEFCUT) assumed control of French-language education in the Toronto area on 1 December 1988.

In 1998 the TBE merged into the Toronto District School Board (TDSB). At that point, 155 College Street became solely used as the board headquarters of the TDSB. The building was subsequently sold to the University of Toronto and the TDSB moved its headquarters to 5050 Yonge Street, formerly the headquarters of the North York Board of Education.

== Preceding School Boards ==
The Board of Education for the City of Toronto was created by the merger of the Toronto Public School Board, the Collegiate Institute Board, and the Technical School Board following a municipal referendum in 1900.

=== The Collegiate Institute Board ===
The Collegiate Institute Board was created in 1807 to oversee what we would now call secondary schools. Unlike the Toronto Public School Board whose trustees were elected, the Collegiate Institute Board was appointed. In its earliest years, Bishop Strachan influenced appointments, but starting in 1841 trustees were appointed by the provincial executive government and by municipal council from 1853-1904. Dean H.J. Grasset is most associated with the board, having served on the board for ten years. Until the late 1880s the board was only responsible for one school, but this changed with the annexation of Parkdale in 1889, leading the Parkdale High School to be renamed the Jameson Avenue Collegiate Institute, and the construction of Harbord Collegiate Institute in 1892. The addition of schools meant that the Toronto High School was renamed the Jarvis Collegiate Institute in 1890, though the school did not move to its current location until 1924.

=== The Technical School Board ===
The Technical School Board was created to oversee a single school, the Toronto Technical School. Classes were first offered in 1892 in St. Lawrence Hall, but when enrollment exceeded expectations they were moved to Old Wycliffe Hall, now part of the University of Toronto campus. In 1901, classes were moved to the Stewart Building due to growing enrollment. Finally, the school moved to its current location in 1915 and is now known as the Central Technical School due to the construction of addition technical schools in the board. Members of the Technical School Board were also appointed but by a different process than members of the Collegiate Institute Board. Members of the Technical School Board were appointed by municipal council, the Architectural Guild, the Trades and Labour Council, and the Association of Stationary Engineers. After amalgamation in 1904, members of the board became part of a special committee of the Toronto Board of Education. Dr. A.C.McKay was an early champion of technical education.

== Schools ==
=== Secondary schools ===
- Jarvis Collegiate
- Parkdale Collegiate
- Harbord Collegiate
- Central Technical School
- Malvern Collegiate
- Oakwood Collegiate
- Humberside Collegiate
- North Toronto Collegiate
- Danforth Collegiate & Technical Institute
- Forest Hill Collegiate
- Lakeview Secondary School (closed 1989)
- Le Collège français (transferred to CEFCUT in 1988)
- Northern Secondary School
- West Park Secondary School (closed 1988)
- Central Commerce Collegiate

=== Primary schools ===
- Adam Beck P.S.
- Blake Street P.S.
- Blythwood P.S.
- BrockP.S.
- Carleton Village P.S.
- Charles G. Fraser P.S.
- Dovercourt P.S.
- Earlscourt P.S.
- Essex P.S.
- Fern P.S.
- General Mercer P.S.
- Howard P.S.
- Hughes P.S.
- Indian Road Crescent P.S.
- Jackman Avenue P.S.
- Jesse Ketchum P.S.
- Keele Street P.S.
- Kew Beach P.S.
- McMurrich P.S.
- Mountview Alternative P.S.
- Parkdale P.S.
- Perth Avenue P.S.
- Regal Road P.S.
- Rosedale P.S.
- Runnymede P.S.
- Whitney P.S.
- Wilkinson P.S.
- Winona P.S.
- D'Arcy P.S. (formerly St. Patrick) - Became the D'Arcy Street Education Office of the Toronto District School Board
- Island Public/Natural Science School
