= Politics of Toronto =

Politics of Canadian city

The politics of Toronto involve the election of representatives to the federal, provincial, and municipal levels of government in Ontario and Canada. A total of 24 Members of Parliament (MPs) representing Toronto sit in the 45th Canadian Parliament at the House of Commons of Canada in Ottawa (the federal capital), and another 25 Members of Ontario's Provincial Parliament (MPPs) sit in the Legislative Assembly of Ontario at Queen's Park, in Toronto. Being Ontario's capital city, many provincial offices are located in the city.

== Overview ==
In terms of electoral politics, Toronto has been an important source of support for the federal Liberal Party of Canada and the provincial Ontario Liberal Party although the downtown area tends to support the Ontario New Democratic Party (NDP). The federal Conservative Party (CPC) and the provincial Progressive Conservative Party have historically been weaker in the city, but some Blue Grit (right-leaning) Liberals come from Toronto ridings.

In the past, the Liberals usually dominated the inner portions of the city federally, and the outer portions were split between the Liberals and Progressive Conservatives (PC). However, the Liberals swept every seat in Toronto from 1993 federal election to 2004 federal election, when former city councillor and federal New Democratic Party leader Jack Layton won the Toronto—Danforth, a downtown riding. The NDP won two more seats in 2006 but lost one in 2008. In the 2011 federal election, Toronto sent nine CPC MPs to Ottawa, eight NDP MPs, and six LPC MPs, the first time that a centre-right party had won seats in Toronto since 1988. However, in 2015 federal election, the LPC swept every seat in Toronto.

Large parts of Toronto, mainly its outer portions, supported the right-wing government of Mike Harris during the 1995 general election and 1999 Ontario elections. However, largely as a result of amalgamating Metropolitan Toronto municipalities against the wishes of three quarters of voters in a municipal plebiscite, as well as of the downloading of responsibility for costly services onto the city, the Conservatives were shut out of Toronto in provincial elections from 2003 to 2013, when they won a by-election.

Businessman and politician Mel Lastman was the first mayor of the newly-amalgamated City of Toronto and the 62nd mayor of Toronto after he won the 1997 municipal election and was re-elected in 2000 municipal election. In December 2003, centre-left politician, David Miller was elected as Toronto's 63rd mayor and was re-elected in November 2006 with nearly 60% of the popular vote with a mandate to make Toronto a city of prosperity, livability, and opportunity for all. Miller declined to run in the following election and a conservative ally, Rob Ford, won the 2010 election handily. Three years later, however, Ford's tumultuous reign and admission to smoking crack, as well as other indiscretions that attracted unwanted international media attention, led City Council to remove many of his powers and much of his office's budget. In the following election, Ford was forced to drop out because of treatment for leomorphic liposarcoma, a rare form of cancer. The 2014 mayoral election was won by John Tory, a lawyer and a former a talk show host, businessman, Member of Provincial Parliament, and Leader of the Official Opposition at Queen's Park (a metonym for Ontario Legislative Building or the Government of Ontario). Among Tory's top priorities are tackling transit and traffic congestion.

The Stronger City of Toronto for a Stronger Ontario Act, 2006 (Bill 53) was enacted by the Legislative Assembly of Ontario on June 12, 2006. The provincial law changed the city's legal powers and responsibilities.

=== Progressive Core ===
Highlighted neighbourhoods are within the Progressive Core

The Progressive Core is a cluster of neighbourhoods in Toronto which support progressive, both social and economic, policies or candidates at above average rates. It consists of largely mature, well-educated neighbourhoods. Geographically, it stretches from the East End, through the Central Core, and to the West End.

== Members of Parliament ==
=== Members by riding ===
Riding	Pic	Name	Party	Prior Experience	Education	Assumed Office	Born In
Beaches—East York		Nate Erskine-Smith	Liberal	Lawyer	Queen's University (BA; JD), University of Oxford (BCL)	2015	1984
Davenport		Julie Dzerowicz	Liberal	Director of Strategic Planning and Communications at the Bank of Montreal	McGill University (B.Comm.), University of British Columbia (MBA); London Business School	2015	
Don Valley West		Rob Oliphant	Liberal	United Church minister, CEO of Asthma Canada	University of Toronto (B.Comm), Vancouver School of Theology (M.Div.), Chicago Theological Seminary (D.Min.)	2015	1956
Don Valley North		Maggie Chi	Liberal			2025	
Eglinton—Lawrence		Vince Gasparro	Liberal			2025	
Etobicoke Centre		Yvan Baker	Liberal	Management consultant	Schulich School of Business (BBA), Tuck School of Business (MBA)	2019	1977
Etobicoke—Lakeshore		James Maloney	Liberal	Lawyer	Bishop's University (BA), University of Windsor (LL.B.), University of Wales (BCL)	2015	
Etobicoke North		John Zerucelli	Liberal			2025	
Humber River—Black Creek		Judy Sgro	Liberal	North York City Council, Toronto City Council, Toronto Police Service Board	University of Toronto (BA, JD)	1999	1944
Scarborough—Agincourt		Jean Yip	Liberal			2017	
Scarborough Centre—Don Valley East		Salma Zahid	Liberal		University of London (Masters of Educational Management and Administration), Quaid-i-Azam University (MBA)	2011	1966
Scarborough North		Shaun Chen	Liberal			2015	1980
Scarborough—Guildwood—Rouge Park		Gary Anandasangaree	Liberal	Real estate broker and lawyer	Carleton University (BA) and Osgoode Hall Law School (LL.B.)	2015	
Scarborough Southwest		Doly Begum	Liberal	Deputy leader of the Ontario New Democratic Party	University of Toronto	2026	1989
Scarborough—Woburn		Michael Coteau	Liberal	Educator and businessman	Carleton University	2021	1972
Spadina—Harbourfront		Chi Nguyen	Liberal			2025	
Taiaiako'n—Parkdale—High Park		Karim Bardeesy	Liberal			2025	
Toronto Centre		Evan Solomon	Liberal	Media personality		2025	
Toronto—Danforth		Julie Dabrusin	Liberal	Lawyer		2015	1971
Toronto—St. Paul's		Leslie Church	Liberal			2025	
University—Rosedale		Danielle Martin	Liberal	Professor in the Department of Family and Community Medicine of the University of Toronto Faculty of Medicine.	McGill University (BA), University of Toronto (MPP), University of Western Ontario (MD)	2026	1975
Willowdale		Ali Ehsassi	Liberal	Lawyer, international law, executive assistant of the Ontario Bar Association	University of Toronto (BA), London School of Economics (M.Sc), Osgoode Hall Law School (LL.B), Georgetown University (LL.M)	2015	1970
York Centre		Roman Baber	Conservative			2025	
York South—Weston—Etobicoke		Ahmed Hussen	Liberal	National president of the Canadian Somali Congress	York University; University of Ottawa	2015	1976

== Members of Provincial Parliament ==
Toronto is represented by 25 MPPs.

=== Members by riding ===
Riding	Name	Party	Prior Experience	Education	Assumed Office	Born In
Beaches—East York	Mary-Margaret McMahon	Liberal	Community animator, Toronto City Councillor for Ward 32 Beaches-East York	Carleton University (BA)	2025	1966
Davenport	Marit Stiles	NDP	Non-profit director, yrustee for the Toronto District School Board, president of the federal New Democratic Party		2018	1969
Don Valley East	Adil Shamji	Liberal	Emergency physician	University of Western Ontario (BMSc), University of Toronto (MD), University of Oxford (MPP)	2022	
Don Valley West	Stephanie Bowman	Liberal	Accountant, bank executive, member of the board of the Bank of Canada, senior executive at Scotiabank, partner at Ernst & Young	University of Western Ontario (BA)	2022	
Don Valley North	Jonathan Tsao	Liberal	Senior political advisor in the Government of Ontario, director of the Yee Hong Centre for Geriatric Care, Toronto City Councillor for Ward 33 Don Valley East, member of the board of management for the Toronto Zoo	University of Toronto (MS), London School of Economics (MSc)	2025	1987
Eglinton—Lawrence	Michelle Cooper	Progressive Conservative	Executive director of the PC Ontario Fund	York University (BA) (MA)	2025	
Etobicoke Centre	Kinga Surma	Progressive Conservative	Toronto City Council		2018	
Etobicoke—Lakeshore	Lee Fairclough	Liberal	President of St. Mary's General Hospital, Kitchener, senior vice-president of clinical care at the Centre for Addiction and Mental Health	University of Toronto	2025	1973
Etobicoke North	Doug Ford	Progressive Conservative	Toronto City Council		2018	1964
Humber River—Black Creek	Tom Rakocevic	NDP	Executive assistant to Anthony Perruzza		2018	
Parkdale—High Park	Alexa Gilmour	NDP	Minister at Windermere United Church	University of Toronto	2025	
Scarborough—Agincourt	Aris Babikian	Progressive Conservative	Citizenship judge		2018	
Scarborough Centre	David Smith	Progressive Conservative	Toronto Public School Trustee for Ward 19/17 Scarborough Centre		2022	
Scarborough—Guildwood	Andrea Hazell	Liberal	Founder of Winspire National Women's Network Foundation, president and chair of the Scarborough Business Association, chair of the Caribbean Philanthropic Council	Seneca Polytechnic	2023	
Scarborough North	Raymond Cho	Progressive Conservative	Social Worker, Toronto City Council, chairman of the Toronto Zoo	University of Toronto (MSW, PhD)	2016	1936
Scarborough—Rouge Park	Vijay Thanigasalam	Progressive Conservative	Financial advisor		2018	1989
Scarborough Southwest	Doly Begum	NDP	Co-Chair of the Scarborough Health Coalition, vice-chair of Warden Woods Community Centre, research analyst	University of Toronto (BA), University College London (Master of Development, Administration & Planning)	2018	1989
Spadina—Fort York	Chris Glover	NDP	Adjunct professor at York University		2018	1961
Toronto Centre	Kristyn Wong-Tam	NDP	Toronto City Councillor for Ward 27 Toronto Centre-Rosedale, Toronto City Councillor for Ward 13 Toronto Centre		2022	1971
Toronto—Danforth	Peter Tabuns	NDP	Toronto City Council	York University (BA)	2006	1951
Toronto—St. Paul's	Stephanie Smyth	Liberal	Broadcast journalist, communications consultant		2025	1964
University—Rosedale	Jessica Bell	NDP	Community organizer, lecturer at Toronto Metropolitan University (formerly Ryerson University, director of the California Food & Justice Coalition, activist, executive director of TTCriders		2018	
Willowdale	Stan Cho	Progressive Conservative	Real estate broker, auditor		2018	
York Centre	Michael Kerzner	Progressive Conservative	Bioscience and technology entrepreneur	York University (BA)	2022	
York South—Weston	Mohamed Firin	Progressive Conservative	Community opportunities advocate, special advisor to the Premier of Ontario		2025	

== Municipal advocacy organizations ==
Unlike other Canadian cities, Toronto does not have municipal political parties. As of 2026, there are 2 major political advocacy organizations, the left-wing Progress Toronto and the centre-right ABC Toronto. These political advocacy organizations can register as a "third party advertiser" with the city clerk and receive certification for enhanced campaign spending privileges during municipal election cycles.

== See also ==
- Bill 103
