= Haudenosaunee settlement of the north shore of Lake Ontario =

Historical Haudenosaunee villages in Canada

Between 1665 and 1670, seven Haudenosaunee settlements on the north shore of Lake Ontario in present-day Province of Ontario, collectively known as the "Iroquois du Nord" villages, were established by Senecas, Cayugas, and Oneidas. The villages consisted of Ganneious,, Kentsio, Ganaraske, Ganatsekwyagon, Teiaiagon, and Quinaouatoua. The villages were all abandoned by 1701.

== Arrival ==
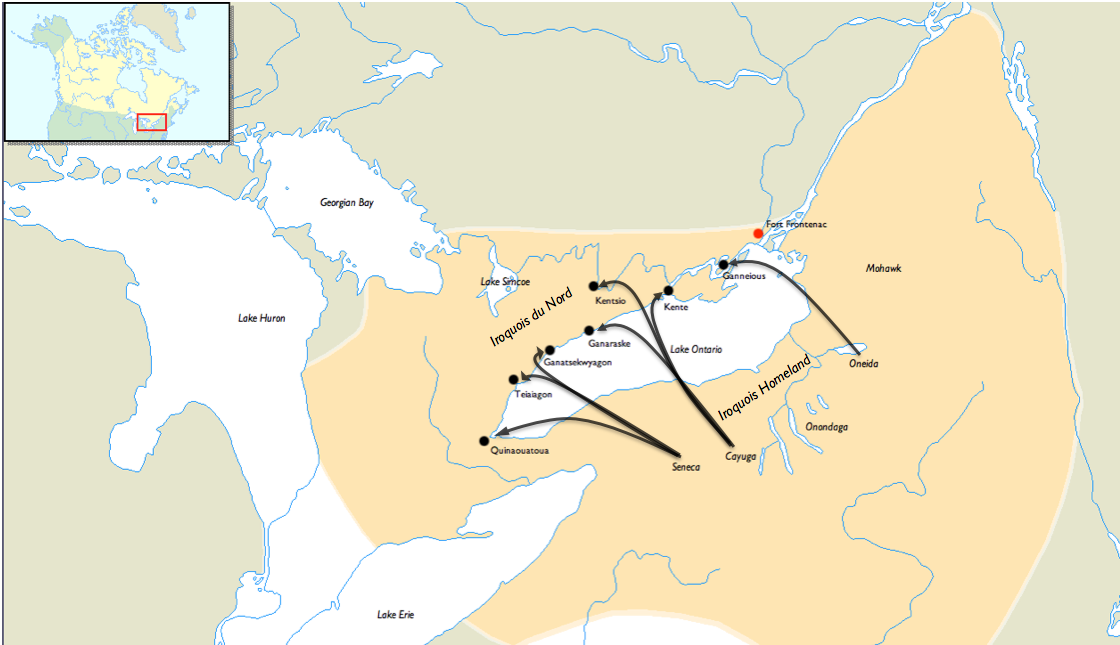
Haudenosaunee Settlement on the north shore of Lake Ontario 1665–1701

The northern shores of Lake Ontario were first settled as early as eleven thousand years ago. While humans have lived along the northern shores of Lake Ontario for a long time, they have not been continuously settled. The Wendat had developed a distinct homeland along the northern shores of Lake Ontario in the 15th century, but moved north toward Georgian Bay by 1615, abandoning the northern shores of Lake Ontario. The Haudenosaunee raided the Wendat in Ontario during the first half of the 17th century and began to establish greater control over the hunting grounds that existed between Lake Ontario and Lake Simcoe. By the 1640s the Wendat population had been reduced considerably by epidemics. In 1649, the Haudenosaunee defeated the Wendat, Petun, and then the Neutral, effectively destroying their enemies in Ontario.

After the destruction of the Wendat in southern Ontario the Haudenosaunee began to make more frequent excursions on the northern shores of Lake Ontario. In the 1660s, the Haudenosaunee began to expand their settlements north. A number of theories try to explain why the Haudenosaunee began settling the northern shores of Lake Ontario. Economic reasons are considered the strongest motivation. By the 1640s the beaver had disappeared through over-hunting in the traditional Haudenosaunee homeland in modern-day New York state. The Haudenosaunee were competing with the Wendat, Odawa, and Algonquins for the fur trade. By establishing settlements on the northern shores of Lake Ontario the Haudenosaunee were able to re-establish control on the flow of furs from the north and west towards Albany and Montreal.

The Haudenosaunee settlement into Ontario was part of a broader expansion of Haudenosaunee groups in the mid 17th century. During this time the Haudenosaunee also moved into what is today Ohio, Pennsylvania, and Quebec. Often these settlements were significantly closer to European settlements and have been characterized as Haudenosaunee Colonies.

== Description ==
The seven villages that were settled on the northern shores of Lake Ontario from east to west are:

- Ganneious (likely misprint for the French Gannejout(s)—Oneida)- on the site of present-day Napanee
- Kente ("prairie" or "meadow") - on the Bay of Quinte
- Kentsio ("abounding in fish") - on Rice Lake
- Ganaraske ("at the spawning-place") - on the site of present-day Port Hope
- Ganatsekwyagon ("among the birches") - at the mouth of the Rouge River
- Teiaiagon ("It crosses the stream.") - at the mouth of the Humber River
- Quinaouatoua (or Tinawatawa) - Near modern-day Hamilton

Little is known about the seven villages due to an absence of detailed archaeological evidence. The most comprehensive archaeological evidence gathered to date is from Bead Hill, which is believed to be the site of Ganatsekwyagon along the Rouge River.

The villages do share some common traits that are evident from the available sources. The northern villages were likely seasonal campsites prior to becoming larger settlements. They are located at strategic points controlling access to Lake Ontario and near seasonally abundant fish and games. Six of the seven villages are all located on the best agricultural land found along the northern shores of the lake, according to the Canada Land Inventory. The Haudenosaunee likely grew squash, corn, and beans.

The villages were also significant staging points for hunting parties moving north and for fur trading. The villages were the scene of extensive trade between both French, Dutch, English, and Ottawa traders and the Haudenosaunee. The villages were also the site of violence due to the exchange of fur for liquor. There are number of incidents that record instances of maiming and death at Ganneious, Teiaiagon, and Ganatsekwyagon due to drinking.

As in other Haudenosaunee settlements longhouses were in parallel to each other and surrounded by palisades. The estimated size of the villages varies from 500 to 800 persons. The villages would have had 20 to 30 structures. Quinaouatoua, was perhaps the smallest with a population of less than 100 in the fall of 1669.

The villages were settled by different tribes. The Seneca settled the westernmost villages of Quinaouatoua, Teiaiagon, and Ganatsekwyagon. The Cayuga settled Ganaraske, Kente, and Kentsio, and the Oneida settled Ganneious along the eastern edge of the lake. The villages were connected to each other by a system of trail and water routes.

While each village is identified with one group, there is a strong likelihood that the villages continued a common Haudenosaunee practice of incorporating and adopting large groups of outsiders into settlements. For example, a Neutral style longhouse was found at Bead Hill, which was initially settled by the Seneca. Existing texts also characterized populations in Haudenosaunee communities distant from the homeland as being multinational and multilingual.

== Relations with the French ==
In 1668, the French began to visit the Haudenosaunee villages to convert the local population to Christianity. Abbé Trouvé and François de Salignac de la Mothe-Fénelon were sent by François de Laval from Montreal to establish a Sulpician mission in the village of Kente. The mission was deserted in 1680 due to a lack of success and funding. Abbé Fénelon then went on a tour of other villages and would spend the winter of 1669 in the village of Ganatsekwyagon. François-Saturnin Lascaris d'Urfé visited a number of the towns on the North shore of Lake Ontario. French explorers Jean Peré and Adrien Jolliet also passed through the village of Ganatsekwyagon in 1669 on their way to Lake Superior.

Relations between the Iroquois du Nord and the French were tense due to the intermediate conflicts known as the Beaver Wars. The villages were settled during a time of relative peace. In 1673 when the French established their first settlement along Lake Ontario, Fort Frontenac, in present-day Kingston, Ontario, many Haudenosaunee from the nearby village of Ganneious resettled closer to the Fort. Relations deteriorated as the political situation in present-day New York state changed, and in 1687 the French attacked the Haudenosaunee, destroying villages in both New York state and along the northern shores of Lake Ontario.

The establishment of Fort Frontenac also appears to have shifted influence from Ganatsekwyagon to Teiaiagon. Most evidence indicates that Ganatsekwyagon was the more important settlement on the north shore due to its strategic position on the Rouge River arm of the Toronto Carrying-Place Trail. Following the construction of Fort Frontenac, Teiaiagon became more travelled for two reasons. First, the construction of the fort shifted the Haudenosaunee toward the western route around Lake Ontario and second the French anchored at Teiaiagon instead of Ganatsekwyagon due to the superior anchorage for French trade barques.

== Abandonment ==
In Anishinaabe oral tradition holds that the Haudenosaunee abandoned their villages north of Lake Ontario following a number of decisive battles won by the Anishinaabe in south and central Ontario during the Beaver Wars. In the Great Peace of Montreal, signed in 1701, the Haudenosaunee Confederacy agreed to remain on the south shore of Lake Ontario. By 1701 the Anishinaabe group called the Mississauga had moved into the area between Lake Erie and the Rouge River.

The easternmost villages of Kente and Ganneious were reportedly destroyed in 1687 by Jacques René de Brisay de Denonville. His troops took 200 prisoners from both villages, to fight in the Beaver Wars, before destroying them. There are no accounts on the fate or condition of either Ganatsekwyagon or Teiaiagon after fighting broke out in 1687. It is assumed that, since both villages were no longer secure, they were abandoned some weeks earlier and the inhabitants fled to the south shore of Lake Ontario.

Following the abandonment of the north of Lake Ontario by Haudenosaunee some French geographers incorrectly place the Iroqouis du Nord and their villages on maps of southern Ontario as late as 1755. This would cause confusion among historians in the future when the Mississauga took possession of the northern shore of Lake Ontario.

== Historical maps showing Haudenosaunee settlement on the north shore ==
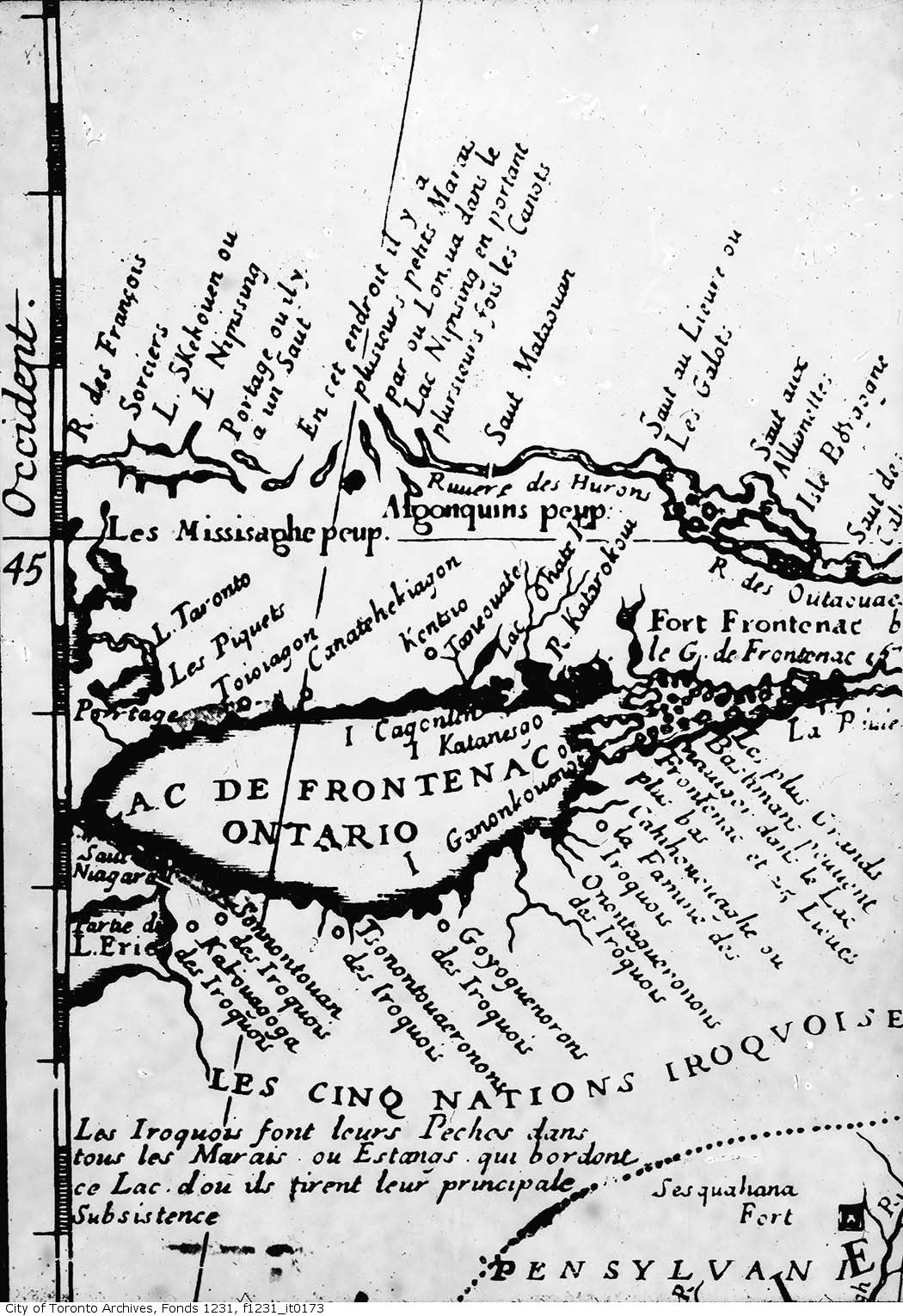
A map from the late 17th century

The following maps show evidence of the Haudenosaunee settlements on the north shore of Lake Ontario.

- Plans des forts faicts par le RegimentlCarignan salieres sur la Riviere de/Richelieu dicte autrement des Iroquois en/la Nouvelle France. Le Mercier. 1666. 1 printed map. France, Minis&e des Colonies, No. 493; Public Archives of Canada (hereafter PAC), National Map Collection (hereafter NMC), H3/901/1666
- "Carte du Lac Ontario . . .," Galinee. 1670. 1 ms. map. France, Archives des Cartes et Plans de la Marine imperiale; PAC, NMC, A/902/1670. In: Plans, Cartes, Vues et Dessins relatifs h 1’Histoire de la Nouvelle France. P. L. Morin. Paris, 1852–53, V. 1, No. 15; J. H. Coyne "Exploration of the Great Lakes, 1669-70 . . ." Ontario Historical Society Papers and Records, V. 4, Toronto, [1903]
- "Carte de la decouverte du Sr Jolliet . . .," [Jolliet]. [1674]. 1 ms. map France, Bibliothèque Nationale (hereafter BN), Service hydrographique, Recueil 67, NO. 52; PAC, NMC, Ph/900 [1674-1701]
- "Carte de la descouverte du Sr Jolliet . . .," [Jolliet]. 1674–51. 1 ms. map. France, Service Historique de la Marine, Bibliothèque, (hereafter SHM, B), 4044B, No. 37; PAC, NMC, H2/903/ [1675]
- "Carte g[e]ne[ra]lle de la France septentrionnale, contenant la decouverte du Pays des Ilinois . . .," [Franquelin]. 1678. 1 ms. map. France, SHM, B, Recueil66, No. 11; PAC, NMC, H3/900/[16781]
- "Carte/pour servir a l’Cclaircissement/du Papier Terrier/de la Nouvelle France", Franquelin. 1678. 1 section of a ms. map. France, BN, Cartes et plans, Service hydrographique, pf. 125, div. 1, p. 1; PAC, NMC, H2/900/1678
- "Cartes des Grands Lacs . . .," Franquelin. 1679. 1 ms. map. France, Depot des cartes et plans de la Marine, Service hydrographique, Bibliothèque (hereafter DMSH, B) Recueil 67, No. 43; PAC, NMC, H3/902/1679
- "Carte du tours du Saint-Laurent . . .," Belmont. 1680. 1 ms. map. France, BN, Geographic, Ge. DD. 2989, Ministere des affaires etrangeres, Depot geographique, Archives, No. 8662; PAC, NMC, H1/902/[1680]
- [Carte des Grands Lacs] "Lac Ontario/Ott/De Frontenac." Bernou. 1680. 1 of a series of 6 ms. maps. France, DMSH, B, Recueil 67, No. 47; PAC, NMC, H3/902/[1680]

== See also ==
- St. Lawrence Iroquoians
