= Taiaiako'n =

Taiaiako'n can refer to:

- Taiaiako'n—Parkdale—High Park, a federal electoral district in Toronto, Canada
- Teiaiagon, an Iroquoian village
