= Ganneious =

Former Haudenosaunee village

Ganneious, also spelled Ganneous, is a former village, first settled by the Oneida, located on the North Shore of Lake Ontario near the present site of Napanee, Ontario, Canada. Starting in 1696, it was occupied by the Mississauga.^{:10} The name is most likely a likely misprint for the French "Gannejout(s)", meaning Oneida.

== History ==
Ganneious was settled temporarily as part of a mid 17th-century northward push by the Haudenosaunee Confederacy from their traditional homeland in today's New York State. The village was one of seven northern bases for the Haudenosaunee from which to hunt beaver and other fur-bearers and to control the flow of furs from the north and west to the markets at Albany. The village was located on or near the fertile and productive soils of the Hay Bay area, near Fredericksburg and Cataraqui. The exact location of the village has not been determined.

In 1673, the French built Fort Frontenac, which is located in modern day Kingston, Ontario and approximately 40 kilometres east of Ganneious. The establishment of the fort had a significant impact on Ganneious; French missionaries made several attempts to encourage the population in Ganneious to resettle closer to the Fort, in order to Christianize, Europeanize and encourage them to learn trades and farm. In 1675, René-Robert Cavelier, Sieur de La Salle and Father Louis Hennepin undertook a journey to Ganneious to convince the Oneida settled there to relocate closer to Fort Frontenac. One of Hennepin's accounts suggests that he was successful and able to convince some people from Ganneious to move and settle around the fort:

While the Brink of the Lake was frozen, I walk'd upon the Ice to an Iroquese village call'd Ganneouse, near to Kente, about nine Leagues off the fort, in company of Sieur de la Salle above-mention'd. These Savages presented us with the Flesh of Elks and Porcupines, which we fed upon. After having discours'd them some time, we return'd, bringing with us a considerable number of the Natives, in order to form a little Village of about Forty Cottages to be inhabited by them, lying betwixt the Fort and our House of Mission.

— Louis Hennepin, A New Discovery of a Vast Country in America

In June 1687, under pressure from King Louis XIV to capture 'prisoners of war for his galleys' the inhabitants of Ganneious were rounded up and held as captives by Jacques Rene de Brisay de Donneville. Donneville departed Montreal in June 1687 with 2,700 men. The troops took 200 prisoners from Kente and Ganneious and destroyed both villages. After 1687, all seven Haudenosaunee Villages on the northern shore of Lake Ontario were abandoned.

Starting from 1696, the village was the location of a Mississauga settlement, but was not occupied until 1721.^{:10-11}

== Haudenosaunee villages ==
By the late 1660s various groups of Haudenosaunee had established seven villages along the shores of Lake Ontario where trails led off into the interior. In addition to Ganneious, the following settlements have been identified by Historian Percy James Robinson:

- Kente – on the Bay of Quinte
- Kentsio – on Rice Lake
- Ganaraske – on the site of present day Port Hope
- Ganatsekwyagon – at the mouth of the Rouge River
- Teiaiagon – at the mouth of the Humber River
- Quinaouatoua (or Tinawatawa) – Near modern day Hamilton

== Fiction ==
Author Gerald Richardson Brown has written a work of historical fiction, Road to Ganneious, which is set in Hay Bay during the 17th and 18th century.
