= ABC Toronto =

Canadian municipal advocacy organization

A Better City Toronto
- Logo
- Abbreviation: ABC Toronto
- Formation: 17 July 2024; 2 years ago
- Founder: Jeffrey Kroeker
- Type: Municipal advocacy organization (NFPO)
- Headquarters: Toronto, Ontario, Canada
- Region served: City of Toronto
- Key people: Kelly Aizicowitz (executive director)
- Website: abctoronto.org

A Better City Toronto (ABC Toronto) is a Canadian centre-right municipal advocacy organization based in Toronto, Ontario. Founded in 2024 and publicly launched in January 2025, the organization advocates for changes to municipal policies concerning public safety, taxation, transportation and city services. It was established as a conservative counterweight to Progress Toronto, a progressive municipal advocacy organization that has supported candidates in Toronto municipal elections.

ABC Toronto has been associated with efforts to organize centre-right opposition to Mayor of Toronto Olivia Chow and supported the mayoral candidacy of Brad Bradford in the 2026 Toronto municipal election.

== History ==
ABC Toronto was incorporated as a non-profit organization on July 17, 2024, by Jeffrey Kroeker, a Toronto business lawyer and Conservative fundraiser. Kroeker had previously served as chief financial officer of Christine Elliott's 2018 Ontario Progressive Conservative leadership campaign and Erin O'Toole's 2020 federal Conservative leadership campaign. He was also chief financial officer of former Toronto police chief Mark Saunders's campaign in the 2023 Toronto mayoral by-election.

According to Kroeker, Saunders and city councillor Brad Bradford encouraged him to establish an organization to counter the influence of Progress Toronto, which had played a role in Chow's election as mayor in 2023. Bradford disputed having played a significant role in the organization's creation.

The organization initially attracted attention in late 2024 through an advertising campaign opposing bicycle lanes on major Toronto streets. It was formally launched in January 2025, with Ariella Kimmel as its first executive director. Kimmel had previously worked for the federal government of Stephen Harper, Alberta's United Conservative Party and the Progressive Conservative Party of Ontario. The organization subsequently appointed Kelly Aizicowitz, a former adviser to Ontario Liberal premier Dalton McGuinty, as executive director.

ABC Toronto was established amid the growing influence of political advocacy organizations in Toronto municipal politics. Although municipal candidates in Ontario run without formal political party affiliations, organizations such as ABC Toronto and Progress Toronto undertake political organizing, advocacy and voter outreach activities between and during municipal elections.

== Political positions and activities ==
ABC Toronto has advocated for increased police funding, stronger measures to address crime and public disorder, and changes to municipal transportation policies. It has called for the removal of bicycle lanes along University Avenue, restrictions on electric mobility vehicles and changes to Toronto's summer camp registration system.

One of the organization's earliest campaigns opposed bicycle lanes on Yonge Street, University Avenue and Bloor Street West. In November 2024, ABC Toronto circulated online advertisements encouraging residents to sign a petition supporting their removal. Kroeker said the organization sought to influence municipal policy on affordability, infrastructure, economic development and quality of life.

The organization has criticized Chow's administration over property taxes, public safety and traffic congestion. In March 2026, it launched an advertising campaign criticizing the mayor's record on taxation, transit and public safety. The campaign consisted of three 30-second advertisements broadcast on television and radio and distributed through digital and social media platforms.

ABC Toronto has also used social media to publicize incidents involving crime, theft, homelessness and public disorder. Its executive director, Kelly Aizicowitz, has appeared in videos discussing municipal policy issues. In September 2026, Toronto Life reported that the organization had approximately 8,000 Instagram followers.

== 2026 municipal election ==
ABC Toronto was active in political advocacy surrounding the 2026 Toronto municipal election, particularly in opposition to the re-election of Mayor Olivia Chow. The organization sought to consolidate support among centrist and conservative voters behind an alternative mayoral candidate.

=== Relationship with Brad Bradford ===
ABC Toronto's relationship with mayoral candidate Brad Bradford attracted media attention during the election campaign. Bradford attended the organization's inaugural event in January 2025, where he was the only sitting politician participating in a panel discussion. Following the event, he publicly welcomed the organization as a counterweight to progressive influence at city hall.

Although Bradford denied having formal ties to ABC Toronto, the organization and his mayoral campaign advocated similar positions on public safety, policing and transportation. In September 2026, Toronto Life reported that the organization's political objectives closely aligned with Bradford's campaign, while noting that the extent of any organizational relationship was unclear.

CityNews reported in September 2026 that ABC Toronto had aligned itself with Bradford's mayoral candidacy. Kroeker described the organization as an effort to bring together moderate, conservative and Liberal voters opposed to the political direction of Chow's administration.

The organization also expressed concern about the possibility of multiple centre-right candidates dividing the anti-Chow vote. Following the entry of former federal cabinet minister Chris Alexander into the mayoral race in July 2026, Aizicowitz described his candidacy as a distraction that could benefit Chow. Kroeker publicly criticized Alexander's decision to run, but subsequently withdrew his remarks.

== Funding and transparency ==
ABC Toronto's funding and disclosure practices attracted scrutiny during the 2026 municipal election. Under Ontario's Municipal Elections Act, 1996, organizations engaging in regulated third-party election advertising must register and comply with spending limits and financial reporting requirements.

As of early September 2026, ABC Toronto had not registered as a third-party advertiser in the municipal election. The organization was consequently restricted from undertaking certain forms of paid election advertising during the regulated campaign period. However, it could continue undertaking political advocacy activities that did not fall within the statutory definition of third-party advertising.

ABC Toronto did not publicly disclose the identities of its financial contributors. According to Toronto Life, the organization maintained that identifying its donors would distract from its advocacy on municipal issues. The magazine compared the role of Toronto's political advocacy organizations with that of super political action committees in the United States, while noting differences in their legal and regulatory frameworks.

== See also ==
- Progress Toronto
- 2026 Toronto municipal election
