= Wladyslaw Lizon =

Canadian politician

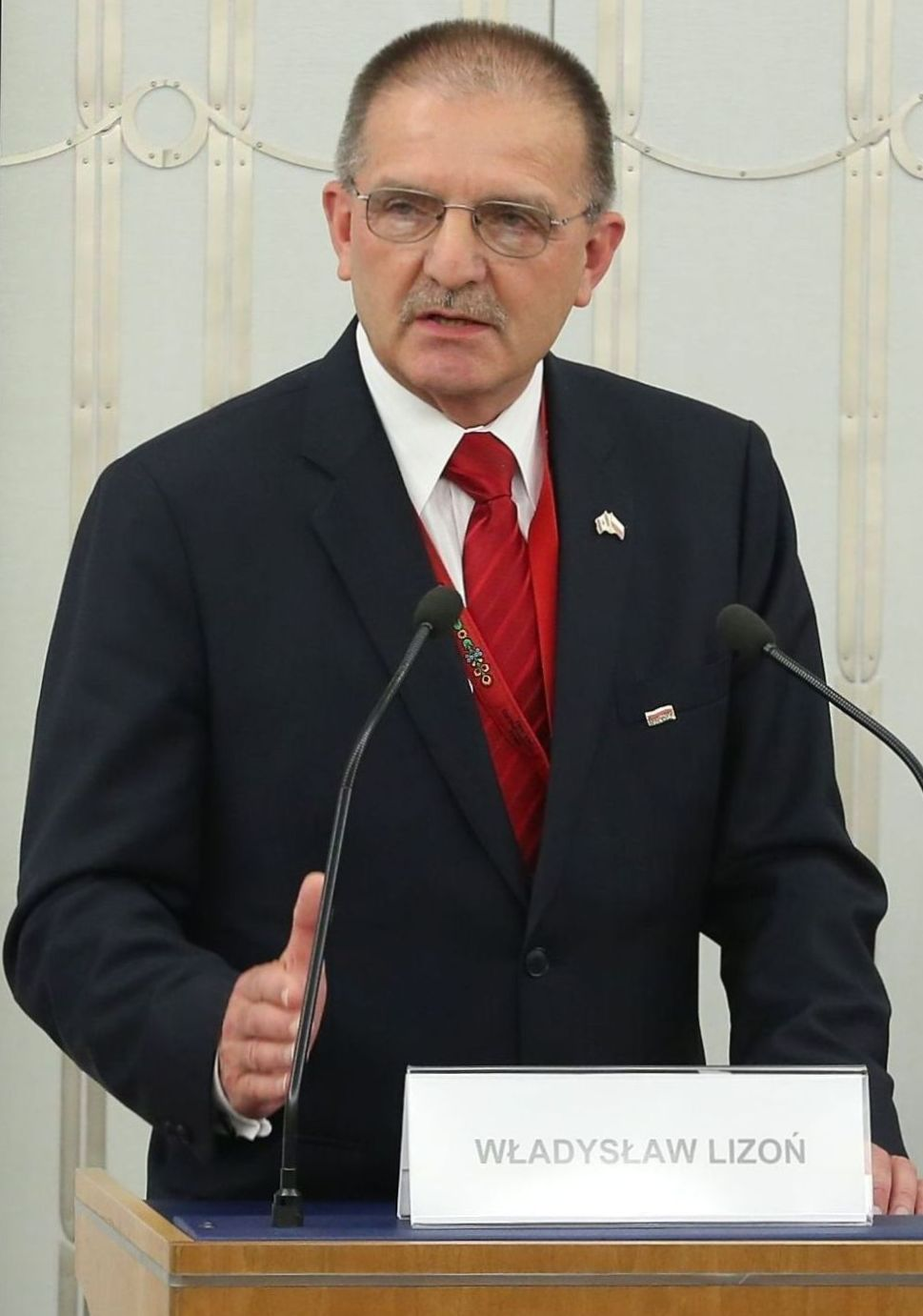
- Lizon addressing the Senate of Poland, 2014

Member of Parliament for Mississauga East—Cooksville
- In office May 2, 2011 – August 4, 2015
- Preceded by: Albina Guarnieri
- Succeeded by: Peter Fonseca

Personal details
- Born: June 27, 1954 (age 71) Nowy Sącz, Poland
- Party: Conservative
- Profession: Engineer

Wladyslaw Lizon (Polish: Władysław Lizoń; born June 27, 1954) is a Polish Canadian politician. He was a Conservative member of the House of Commons of Canada from 2011 to 2015 who represented the Greater Toronto Area riding of Mississauga East—Cooksville. He was the second Polish-born member of Parliament (MP), after Alexandre-Édouard Kierzkowski.

== Background ==
Lizon graduated from the AGH University of Science and Technology in Kraków, Poland with a master's degree in mining engineering in 1978. He was an engineer in Poland's Silesia coal mines until 1983. In 1988, he immigrated to Canada and created Gomark Enterprises, a consulting business that designs and supplies interior stone finishes and imports and services machinery used in the stone industry.

Lizon was the president of the Canadian Polish Congress from 2005 to 2010. He assisted in the removal of visa requirements for visitors from Poland. He is also a founding member of Tribute to Liberty, an advocacy group dedicated to building the 'Memorial to the Victims of Communism – Canada, a Land of Refuge' national monument in Ottawa to remember the victims of communism in the world, and Canada's place as a refuge.

== Politics ==
In the 2011 Canadian federal election, Lizon ran as Conservative candidate in the riding of Mississauga East—Cooksville. He defeated Liberal candidate Peter Fonseca by 676 votes.

In September 2011, Lizon introduced Bill C-266, An Act to establish Pope John Paul II Day, also called by its short title: Pope John Paul II Day Act. A similar bill was first introduced in October 2010 by Liberal MP Andrew Kania. Both bills sought to recognize April 2 as a day to honour the memory of the late Pope John Paul II. Bill C-266 received Royal Assent on December 16, 2014, becoming law. April 2, 2015, the 10-year anniversary of the death of Pope John Paul II, was incidentally the first Pope John Paul II Day observed in Canada.

In 2012, Lizon was criticized by the South Asian community and other members of parliament when he sent out a survey to his constituents asking what languages they spoke, with one of the languages listed as "Indian". Jim Karygiannis, the Liberal MP for Scarborough—Agincourt, issued a press release calling the mailer insulting and comparing it to asking someone if they speak "Canadian" or "Mexican".

In 2013, Lizon joined two other Conservative MPs – Maurice Vellacott and Leon Benoit – in writing a letter to the RCMP requesting a homicide investigation into some late-term abortions that may have resulted in live births. The letter was criticized as an attempt to reopen the abortion debate. Prime Minister Stephen Harper said, "I think all members of this House, whether they agree with it or not, understand that abortion is legal in Canada and this government, myself included, have made it very clear that the government does not intend to change the law in this regard."

In the 2015 election, Lizon again faced Fonseca. This time, Fonseca defeated him by 9,801 votes. Lizon was defeated by Fonseca again in the 2019 election, this time by a margin of 10,259 votes.

In the 2025 election, Lizon ran as the Conservative candidate in the newly created Taiaiako'n—Parkdale—High Park electoral district, placing third.

== Electoral record ==
2025 Canadian federal election: Taiaiako'n—Parkdale—High Park
Party	Candidate	Votes	%	±%	Expenditures
Liberal	Karim Bardeesy	36,439	55.80	+13.01	
New Democratic	Bhutila Karpoche	15,003	22.97	–15.43	
Conservative	Wladyslaw Lizon	12,662	19.40	+6.07	
Green	Anna Gorka	700	1.1	–0.84	
Animal Protection	Edward Fraser	184	0.28	N/A	
Communist	Rimmy Riarh	137	0.21	N/A	
Marijuana	Terry Parker	96	0.15	N/A	
Marxist–Leninist	Lorne Gershuny	92	0.14	N/A	
Total valid votes/expense limit		65,313			
Total rejected ballots		299			
Turnout		65,612	71.30		
Eligible voters		92,011			
Liberal notional hold		Swing		+14.22	
Source: Elections Canada

2019 Canadian federal election: Mississauga East—Cooksville
Party	Candidate	Votes	%	±%	Expenditures
Liberal	Peter Fonseca	27,923	53.1	-1.13	$54,292.81
Conservative	Wladyslaw Lizon	17,664	33.6	-1.75	none listed
New Democratic	Tom Takacs	4,643	8.8	+0.17	none listed
Green	Maha Rasheed	1,578	3.0	+1.52	$0.00
People's	Syed Rizvi	637	1.2		$2,799.42
Marxist–Leninist	Anna Di Carlo	178	0.3	-0.01	$0.00
Total valid votes/expense limit		52,623	100.0		
Total rejected ballots		483			
Turnout		53,106	62.1		
Eligible voters		85,584			
Liberal hold		Swing		+0.31	
Source: Elections Canada

2015 Canadian federal election: Mississauga East—Cooksville
Party	Candidate	Votes	%	±%	Expenditures
Liberal	Peter Fonseca	28,154	54.23	+18.07	$85,296.75
Conservative	Wladyslaw Lizon	18,353	35.35	-8.20	$109,692.04
New Democratic	Ali Naqvi	4,481	8.63	-9.03	$34,143.24
Green	Jaymini Bhikha	766	1.48	-0.69	–
Marxist–Leninist	Tim Sullivan	163	0.31	–	–
Total valid votes/expense limit		51,917	100.00		$217,661.14
Total rejected ballots		287	0.55		
Turnout		52,204	63.87		
Eligible voters		81,736			
Liberal gain from Conservative		Swing		+13.13	
Source(s): "Mississaugs East--Cooksville". Election Results. Elections Canada.; Elections Canada – Preliminary Election Expenses Limits for Candidates

2011 Canadian federal election: Mississauga East—Cooksville
Party	Candidate	Votes	%	±%	Expenditures
Conservative	Wladyslaw Lizon	18,796	39.97	+7.42	$90,142
Liberal	Peter Fonseca	18,120	38.53	-11.63	$71,450
New Democratic	Waseem Ahmed	8,836	18.79	+7.44	$6,591
Green	Jaymini Bhikha	1,032	2.19	-3.05	$968
Marxist–Leninist	Pierre Chénier	241	0.51	-0.16	
Total valid votes/expense limit		47,025	100.00		$169,151
Total rejected ballots		289	0.61		
Turnout		47,314	56.8		
Eligible voters		83,018			
Conservative gain from Liberal		Swing		+9.52	
Source(s) Elections Canada (2011). "Official Voting Results: Forty-first General Election".
