= Bhutila Karpoche =

Canadian politician

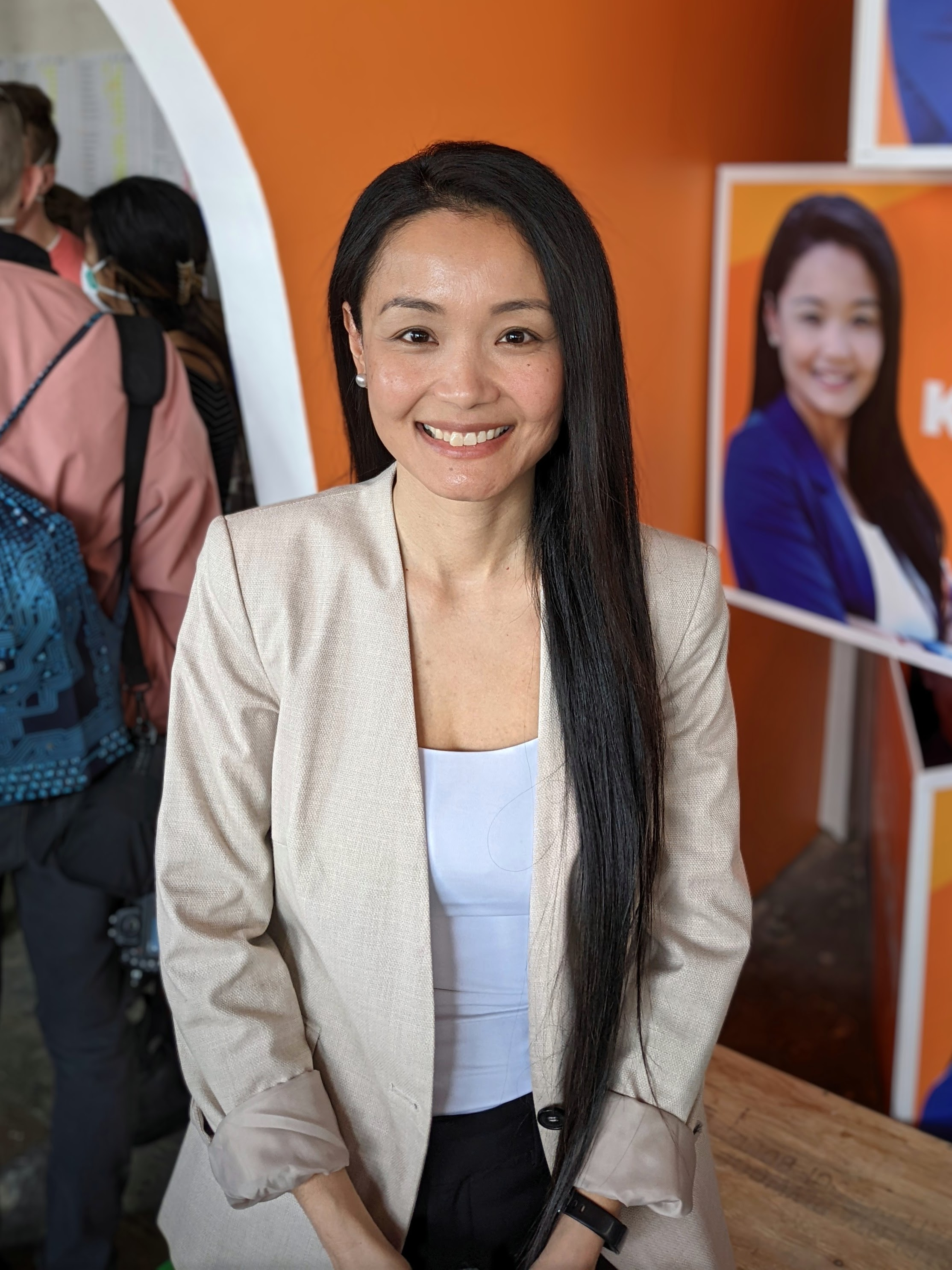
- Karpoche in 2022

Official Opposition Critic for GTA Issues
- In office July 13, 2022 – January 28, 2025
- Leader: Peter Tabuns

Official Opposition Critic for Early Childhood Development and Child Care
- In office February 2, 2021 – January 28, 2025
- Leader: Peter Tabuns; Andrea Horwath

Deputy Opposition Whip
- In office August 23, 2018 – August 30, 2019
- Leader: Andrea Horwath
- Succeeded by: Doly Begum

Member of the Ontario Provincial Parliament for Parkdale—High Park
- In office June 7, 2018 – January 28, 2025
- Preceded by: Cheri DiNovo
- Succeeded by: Alexa Gilmour

Personal details
- Born: 1983 or 1984 (age 42–43) Kathmandu, Nepal
- Party: NDP (federal); Ontario NDP (provincial)
- Education: University of British Columbia (B.Sc.); University of Toronto (M.P.H.)
- Occupation: Politician; epidemiologist
- Website: www.bhutilakarpoche.ca

Bhutila Tenzin Karpoche (/buːˈtɪlə ˌkɑːrpəˈtʃeɪ/ boo-TILL-ə KAR-pə-CHAY; Tibetan: བུ་ཁྲིད་ལ་དཀར་པོ་ཆེས།, born 1983 or 1984) is a Canadian politician who served as the member of Provincial Parliament (MPP) for Parkdale—High Park from 2018 to 2025, as a member of the Ontario New Democratic Party (NDP). Born in Nepal, Karpoche is the first person of Tibetan descent ever elected to public office in North America. She also served as Deputy Speaker of the Ontario Legislature from 2022-2025.

== Early life and education ==
Karpoche was born in Nepal and is the second of four children. Her name was chosen by the 14th Dalai Lama, whom she later met when she was 16, and means "Mother of 10,000 children." All her parents and grandparents were Tibetan refugees who fled Tibet with the Dalai Lama after the 1959 Tibetan uprising and settled in Nepal. In an interview, Karpoche said that she was born stateless despite her birth in Nepal and had no pathways to legalize her status there, as the Nepalese government systematically excludes Tibetans as refugees due to political reasons.

In 2002, Karpoche, then 18, left Nepal with her entire family in haste amid the escalation of the Nepalese civil war, which saw large-scale fightings between Nepali forces and the Communist Party of Nepal in rural areas. They joined their relatives and settled in the Toronto neighbourhood of Parkdale, where Little Tibet is situated.

Karpoche started her university education and attended University of British Columbia for her undergraduate studies, earning a bachelor of science degree. She also holds a master of public health degree in epidemiology from the University of Toronto's Dalla Lana School of Public Health and was a PhD candidate in public health policy at Toronto Metropolitan University, although she said in 2019 that she has put it "on hold."

Karpoche's first language is Tibetan and she learned English while living in Nepal. In addition, she also speaks Nepali and has taken lessons in Spanish and French.

== Political career ==
Prior to her election, Karpoche worked for Cheri DiNovo, her predecessor as MPP for Parkdale—High Park, first in DiNovo's constituency office and more recently as her executive assistant at Queen's Park. She also served on the board of directors of the Canadian Tibetan Association of Ontario, and on the steering committee of the International Tibet Network.

In November 2024, she was nominated as the federal NDP candidate for Taiaiako'n—Parkdale—High Park.

=== Member of Provincial Parliament ===
On September 14, 2017, the Parkdale—High Park NDP riding association nominated Karpoche as the party's candidate in the 2018 general election. She won the election on June 7, 2018, and her party won the second most seats, becoming the Official Opposition.

Following her election, NDP leader Andrea Horwath appointed Karpoche as deputy opposition whip and mental health and addictions critic. In a shadow cabinet shuffle on August 30, 2019, the deputy opposition whip was passed to Doly Begum.

In 2019, she was voted Toronto's Best Local Politician by Toronto Star readers. She was voted Best MPP by Now Magazine readers in 2019, 2020 and 2021. In 2023, she received the Parliamentarian Champion national award from Canadian Alliance on Mental Illness and Mental Health (CAMIMH) recognizing her work to advance the mental health agenda across the country. She is also the recipient of the Queen Elizabeth II Diamond Jubilee Medal 2012 and the King Charles III Coronation Medal 2025.

Karpoche was re-elected in the 2022 election with 53.97% of the popular vote.

Following the selection of Interim Leader Peter Tabuns, Karpoche retained her critic portfolio of early childhood development and children, and was assigned the additional portfolio of GTA issues. On July 15, 2022, it was announced that the Ontario NDP would be nominating Karpoche as a Deputy Speaker in the 43rd parliament.

As of August 11, 2024, she serves as the Official Opposition's critic for Affordability and for GTA issues.

In September 2024, Karpoche announced she would not seek re-election in the 2025 Ontario general election so that she could run in the 2025 Canadian federal election in the federal constituency of Taiaiako'n—Parkdale—High Park.

== Electoral record ==
2025 Canadian federal election: Taiaiako'n—Parkdale—High Park
Party	Candidate	Votes	%	±%	Expenditures
Liberal	Karim Bardeesy	36,439	55.80	+13.01	
New Democratic	Bhutila Karpoche	15,003	22.97	–15.43	
Conservative	Wladyslaw Lizon	12,662	19.40	+6.07	
Green	Anna Gorka	700	1.1	–0.84	
Animal Protection	Edward Fraser	184	0.28	N/A	
Communist	Rimmy Riarh	137	0.21	N/A	
Marijuana	Terry Parker	96	0.15	N/A	
Marxist–Leninist	Lorne Gershuny	92	0.14	N/A	
Total valid votes/expense limit		65,313			
Total rejected ballots		299			
Turnout		65,612	71.30		
Eligible voters		92,011			
Liberal notional hold		Swing		+14.22	
Source: Elections Canada

2022 Ontario general election: Parkdale—High Park
Party	Candidate	Votes	%	±%	Expenditures
New Democratic	Bhutila Karpoche	23,024	53.97	–5.44	$114,469
Liberal	Karim Bardeesy	9,547	22.38	+5.38	$118,634
Progressive Conservative	Monika Frejlich	6,270	14.70	–3.31	$12,433
Green	Patrick Macklem	2,587	6.06	+1.40	$2,663
New Blue	Danielle Height	537	1.26	–	$0
Ontario Party	Craig Peskett	349	0.82	–	$0
Communist	Gunes Agduk	221	0.52	+0.27	$0
People's Political Party	Oliver Roberts	129	0.30	–	$0
Total valid votes/expense limit		42,664	99.47	–	$120,799
Total rejected, unmarked and declined ballots		228	0.53	–0.33	
Turnout		42,892	50.25	–12.18	
Eligible voters		85,352			
New Democratic hold		Swing		–5.41	
Source: Elections Ontario

2018 Ontario general election: Parkdale—High Park
Party	Candidate	Votes	%	±%
New Democratic	Bhutila Karpoche	32,407	59.41	+18.64
Progressive Conservative	Adam Pham	9,821	18.00	+5.17
Liberal	Nadia Guerrera	9,271	17.00	–22.57
Green	Halyna Zalucky	2,544	4.66	–0.83
Libertarian	Matthias Nunno	371	0.68	+0.26
Communist	Jay Watts	135	0.25	–
Total valid votes		54,549	99.14	
Total rejected, unmarked and declined ballots		474	0.86	–0.20
Turnout		55,023	62.43	+5.55
Eligible voters		88,131		
New Democratic hold		Swing		+6.73
Source: Elections Ontario
