= Taiaiako'n—Parkdale—High Park =

Federal electoral district in Ontario, Canada

Ontario electoral district
- Interactive map of riding boundaries from the 2025 federal election
- Coordinates: 43.65°N 79.47°W

Federal electoral district
- Legislature: House of Commons
MP
Karim Bardeesy
Liberal
- District created: 2023
- First contested: 2025
- District webpage: profile, map

Demographics
- Population (2021): 117,873
- Electors (2025): 89,802
- Area (km²): 17
- Pop. density (per km²): 6,933.7
- Census division: Toronto
- Census subdivision: Toronto (part)

Taiaiako'n–Parkdale—High Park is a federal electoral district in Toronto, Ontario, Canada. It is made up mostly of the old Parkdale—High Park and the southern portion of York South—Weston. It was created during the 2022 Canadian federal electoral redistribution process. The 2023 representation orders renamed the electoral district to Taiaiako'n—Parkdale—High Park. The new electoral district came into effect upon the calling of the 2025 Canadian federal election. Karim Bardeesy was elected as the riding's first member of Parliament during the 2025 federal election.

According to the 2016 census, Taiaiako'n–Parkdale—High Park has the lowest percentage of visible minorities (26.2%) among all City of Toronto electoral districts. It also has the highest percentage of people of Irish (20.0%), German (9.8%), and French (8.9%) ethnic origin of all City of Toronto electoral districts.

== Geography ==
It is located in the central-west part of Toronto on the lakefront. It has 106,559 residents. It is composed of the seven neighbourhoods surrounding High Park. Including the park and portions west, between the north and south borders of the park is the neighbourhood of Swansea; north of the park are the neighbourhoods of High Park North and the entirety of The Junction; north-west of the park are the neighbourhoods of Runnymede-Bloor West Village and Lambton Baby Point; to the east of the park is Roncesvalles; and Parkdale directly to the south and to the south-east.

It consists of the part of the City of Toronto bounded on the south by Lake Ontario, on the west by the Humber River, and on the north along a Toronto Hydro corridor north of St Clair Avenue, continuing eastward until it reaches a GO Transit rail line east of Keele St. The eastern boundary then follows the rail corridor southeast until it reaches Atlantic Avenue and King Street, following Atlantic to the Gardiner Expressway, which it follows westward until reaching the southerly production of Spencer Avenue.

== History ==
Prior to the 2023 representation orders from the 2022 Canadian federal electoral redistribution process, the electoral district was named Parkdale—High Park, with different borders. In 1996, it was defined to consist of the parts of the cities of Toronto and York bounded on the west by the city limits of Toronto and York, and on the north, east and south by a line drawn east along the Canadian Pacific Railway, southeast along the Canadian National Railway, south along Atlantic Avenue, west along the Gardiner Expressway, and south along the southerly production of Spencer Avenue.

In 2003, the old Parkdale—High Park was given its final boundaries as described above. This electoral district was unchanged after the 2012 electoral redistribution. However, the 2023 representation orders did change the name by adding "Taiaiako'n" to the beginning of the name, and the boundaries had significant changes in the north, including much of traditional area of the old City of West Toronto that was part of the old High Park electoral district pre-1976. The name Taiaiako'n refers to the former Iroquoian village of Teiaiagon, which was situated in the district on the Humber River.

== Demographics ==
According to the 2021 Canadian census

Ethnic groups: 69.1% White, 6.0% Black, 5.1% South Asian, 3.9% Chinese, 2.7% Filipino, 2.7% Latin American, 1.9% Southeast Asian, 1.8% Indigenous

Languages: 65.8% English, 2.7% Polish, 2.4% Spanish, 1.8% French, 1.8% Portuguese, 1.6% Tibetan, 1.5% Russian, 1.4% Ukrainian, 1.1% Tagalog, 1.0% Vietnamese, 1.0% Serbian, 1.0% Cantonese

Religions: 43.1% Christian (24.1% Catholic, 4.0% Christian Orthodox, 2.8% Anglican, 2.6% United Church, 6.7% Other), 3.5% Buddhist, 2.9% Muslim, 2.0% Jewish, 1.9% Hindu, 45.3% None

Median income: $46,800 (2020)

Average income: $72,800 (2020)

== Electoral district associations ==
Canadian political parties are locally represented by Electoral district associations (EDA). Elections Canada officially recognizes the following Taiaiako'n—Parkdale—High Park EDAs:

Party	Association name	President	HQ address	HQ city
Conservative	Taiaiako'n—Parkdale—High Park Conservative Association	Irene Stewart	M6S 4Z6	Toronto
Green	Taiaiako'n—Parkdale—High Park Green Party Association	Gerry J. Rankin	M6N 2H3	Toronto
Liberal	Taiaiako'n—Parkdale—High Park Federal Liberal Association	Derek J. Raymaker	M6S 1J5	Toronto
New Democratic	Taiaiako'n—Parkdale—High Park Federal NDP Riding Association	Francis Kung	M6R 3B5	Toronto

== Members of Parliament ==
This electoral district has elected the following members of Parliament:

Parliament	Years	Member	Party
Taiaiako'n—Parkdale—High Park; Riding created from Parkdale–High Park and York South—Weston
45th	2025–present	Karim Bardeesy	Liberal

== Election results ==
=== 2025 ===
Polling division map.

Advance polling division map.

2025 Canadian federal election
Party	Candidate	Votes	%	±%	Expenditures
Liberal	Karim Bardeesy	36,439	55.80	+13.01	
New Democratic	Bhutila Karpoche	15,003	22.97	–15.43	
Conservative	Wladyslaw Lizon	12,662	19.40	+6.07	
Green	Anna Gorka	700	1.1	–0.84	
Animal Protection	Edward Fraser	184	0.28	N/A	
Communist	Rimmy Riarh	137	0.21	N/A	
Marijuana	Terry Parker	96	0.15	N/A	
Marxist–Leninist	Lorne Gershuny	92	0.14	N/A	
Total valid votes/expense limit		65,313			
Total rejected ballots		299			
Turnout		65,612	71.30		
Eligible voters		92,011			
Liberal notional hold		Swing		+14.22	
Source: Elections Canada

=== 2021 ===
2021 federal election redistributed results
Party	Vote	%
Liberal	24,400	42.79
New Democratic	21,893	38.40
Conservative	7,603	13.33
People's	1,825	3.20
Green	1,077	1.89
Others	220	0.39

== See also ==
- List of Canadian electoral districts
- Historical federal electoral districts of Canada
