= Mark Sanders =

Mark Sanders or Marcus Sanders may refer to:

- Mark Sanders (cricketer) (born 1979), South African cricketer
- Mark Sanders (designer), British designer and engineer
- Mark D. Sanders (born 1950), American musician
- Marcus Sanders (sprinter) (born 1963), U.S. champion in the 600 yards at the 1986 USA Indoor Track and Field Championships

== See also ==
- Mark Saunders (disambiguation)
