= Bead Hill =

Seneca archaeological site in Toronto, Canada

Coordinates: 43.8041°N 79.1401°W

- Ganatsekwyagon (Seneca)
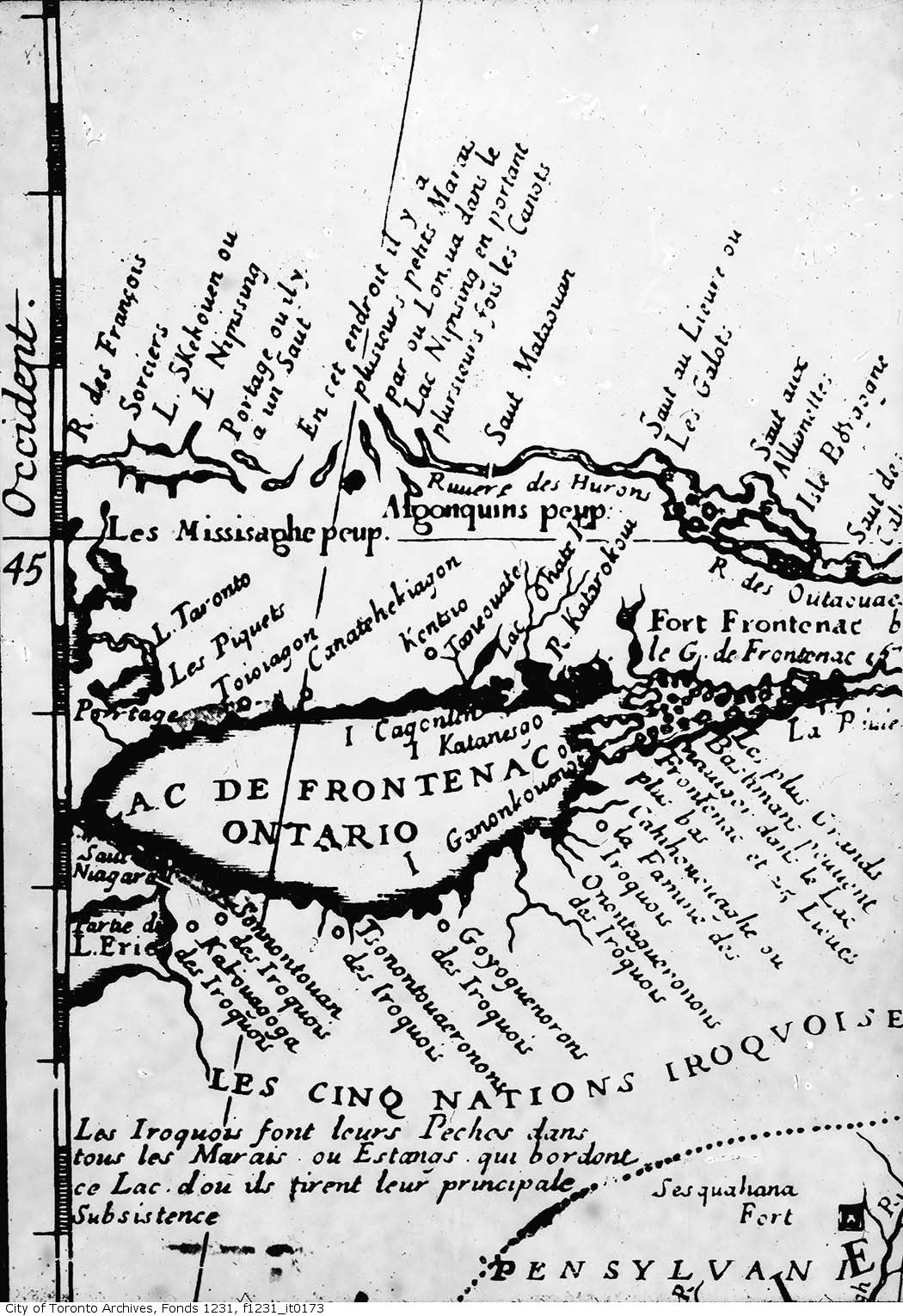
- Late 1600s map of Lac de Frontenac (Lake Ontario), showing Ganatsekwyagon (Ganatchekiagon) and Lac Taronto, and the land occupied by the Mississaugas and the Haudenosaunee
- Interactive map of Bead Hill
- Periods: 17th century
- Cultures: Haudenosaunee

Site notes
- Public access: No

National Historic Site of Canada
- Official name: Bead Hill National Historic Site of Canada
- Designated: 1991

Bead Hill is an archaeological site comprising the only known remaining and intact 17th-century Seneca site in Canada. It is located on the banks of the Rouge River in Rouge Park, a national park in Toronto, Ontario. Because of its sensitive archaeological nature, it is not open to the public, nor readily identified in the park. It was designated a National Historic Site in 1991, eventually becoming a unit of the national park system in June 2019.

== Bead Hill site ==
The Bead Hill site is believed to be one of seven villages established along the north shore of Lake Ontario by the Haudenosaunee in the 1660s. The Bead Hill site was settled temporarily as part of a mid 17th century push by the Haudenosaunee Confederacy north, from their traditional homeland south of Lake Ontario. The Wendat Confederacy had once occupied the north shores of Lake Ontario but had moved north toward Georgian Bay and Lake Simcoe at the end of the 16th century.

Following extensive excavation undertaken in the 1980s, it was determined that the site could be the historically documented village of Ganatsekwyagon. Evidence from test excavations suggests that it was home to about 500 to 800 people for about 22 years (1665–1687). Bead Hill was primarily a fur trading outlet, not a military or agricultural site. It was located at the nexus of major trade and transportation routes, including the lakeshore trail that follows modern-day Kingston Road and the historic Toronto Carrying-Place Trail.

Bead Hill is adjacent to Glen Rouge Park and Campgrounds.

== Ganatsekwyagon ==
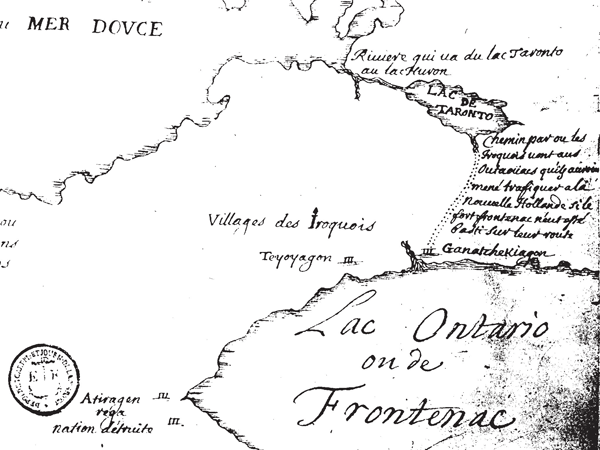
Map showing Ganatsekwyagon and the Rouge Trail to Lake Simcoe, c. 1673 by Louis Jolliet.

The Bead Hill site is believed to contain the archaeological remains of the village of Ganatsekwyagon. French missionaries and explorers arrived at Ganatsekwyagon in 1669. François de Salignac de la Mothe-Fénelon passed the winter of 1669 in the village, which was the first recorded residence of Europeans in the neighbourhood of Toronto. François-Saturnin Lascaris d'Urfé may have also spent the winter of 1669 in Ganatsekwyagon with Abbé Fénelon but the records are unclear.

The village was an important fur trading post and was part of the regional power struggle between the French, British, and Haudenosaunee. The Comte de Frontenac wrote to Louis XIV in the fall of 1674 that the Haudenosaunee "have given their word not to continue the trade, which as I informed you last year, they had commenced to establish at Ganatsekwyagon, with the Ottawas, which would have absolutely ruined ours by the transfer of the furs to the Dutch."

Tensions between the Haudenosaunee and French led to a number of conflicts over the course of the 17th century which are collectively known as the Beaver Wars, which would gravely affect Ganatsekwyagon. In 1687, the French, led by the Marquis de Denonville, began a campaign against the Senecas in northwest New York state. Denonville destroyed most of the Seneca villages in New York. It is unclear whether the French also destroyed Ganatsekwyagon and other Haudenosaunee villages on the North Shore of Lake Ontario in his 1687 campaign, or if the villages were abandoned as the Haudenosaunee on the north shore of Lake Ontario retreated to New York state. Haudenosaunee villages were usually temporary and tended to shift to a new location every 10–20 years. Therefore, it is not unusual that villages were abandoned. Regardless of the exact reason, following the 1687 campaign the Haudenosaunee were restricted to south of Lake Ontario and Ganatsekwyagon was abandoned.

The name likely means "among the birches". Because early Europeans had difficulty in transcribing First Nations names into European orthographic systems, numerous spelling variations exist. Alternate names for the village included:

- Ganacheieskiagon
- Ganastiquiagon
- Ganatchekiagon
- Ganatsekwyagon
- Gandatsekiagon
- Gandatsekwyagon
- Gandatsdhagon
- Gandatsetiagon
- Gandat Siagon
- Gandatsiagon
- Ganestiguiagon
- Ganetsekiagon
- Gandalskiagon
- Kanatiochtiage
- Le Portage de Toronto
- Toronto Carrying Place
- Toronto Portage

== Early descriptions of Bead Hill ==
William Brown, who was renting a saw mill on the Rouge River, was one of the first individuals to describe Bead Hill in 1849. After his employees found the site and he inspected it, he wrote,

There were pieces of broken pottery, broken guns, and flint heads of some very handsome tobacco pipes which the men brought away. They intended to go again ... But I persuaded them to allow the dead to rest in peace, going, however, to view the place myself; and I found that about 40 acres had been appropriated as a place of sepulture, and that no grave had been deeper than about two feet from the surface. The whole of the steep bank of the river had been used, and the graves being one above another in the hillside, they looked like steps from the top to the bottom.

In 1885, C. Blackett Robinson published A History of Toronto and County of York, which described artifacts found "near the mouth of the Rouge River, where the site of what was once a considerable Indian village was indicated by the remains of the logs which formed a wooden palisade surrounding their habitations." Some of these artifacts, the account continued, "have all the characteristics of the stone age, and mixed with the rude weapons and implements of 'native industry' are those of copper and iron, and also glass beads, which were probably obtained by intercourse with the early French voyageurs and traders ... A few yards from the site of the village a number of graves containing aboriginal remains were discovered."

== Haudenosaunee villages on the north shore of Lake Ontario ==
By the late 1660s various Five Nation Haudenosaunee had established seven villages along the shores of Lake Ontario where trails led off into the interior. In addition to Ganatsekwyagon at the mouth of the Rouge River, the following settlements have been identified by historian Percy James Robinson:

- Ganneious – on the site of present-day Napanee
- Kente – on the Bay of Quinte
- Kentsio – on Rice Lake
- Ganaraske – on the site of present-day Port Hope
- Teiaiagon – on a hillside overlooking the Humber River, today's Baby Point neighbourhood in Toronto
- Quinaouatoua (or Tinawatawa) – near modern-day Hamilton
