= Teiaiagon =

Former Haudenosaunee village in Ontario, Canada

Coordinates: 43.65601320416743°N 79.49539641090861°W

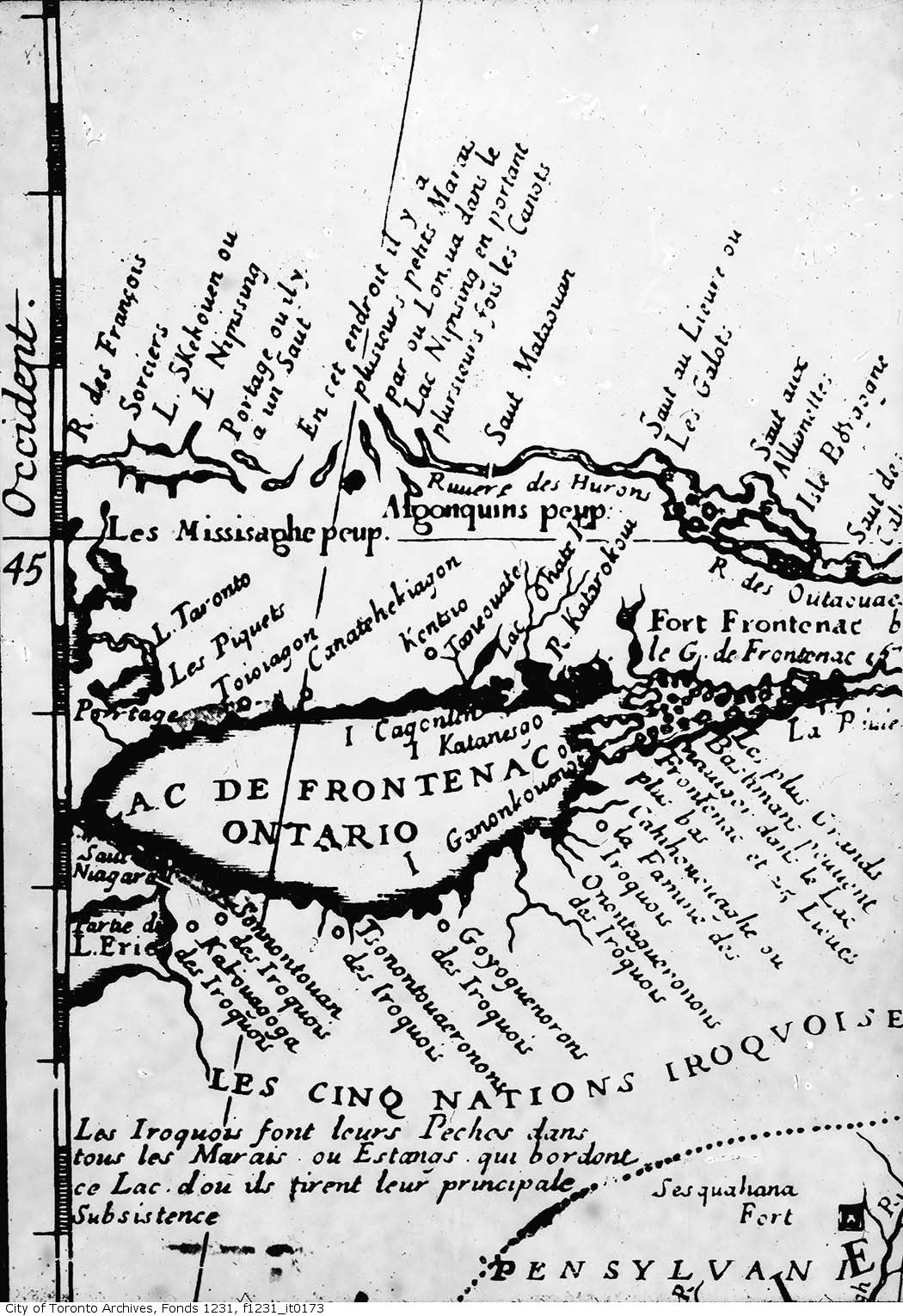
A map from the late 17th century showing Teiaiagon near "Lac de Frontenac", now known as Lake Ontario. Also shown is the village of Ganatsekwyagon (listed as Canatehekiagon).

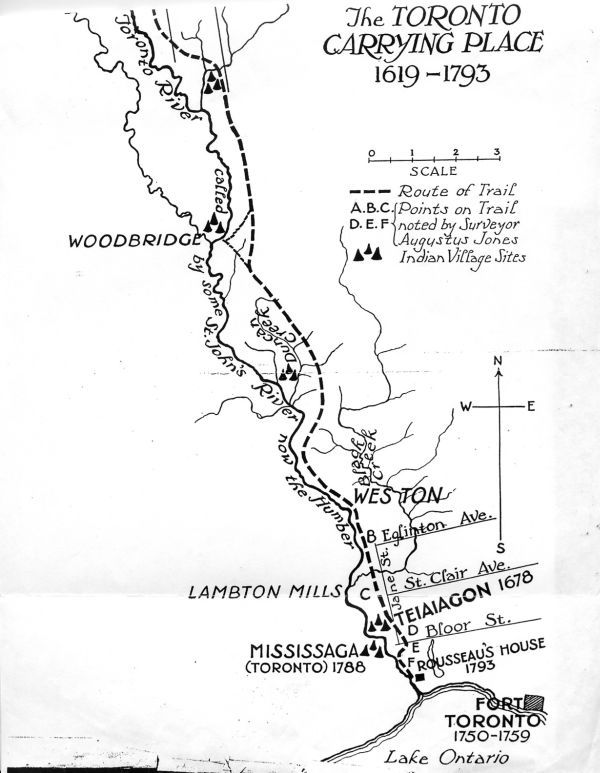
Map of the Toronto Carrying-Place Trail, with Teiaiagon shown near the bottom.

Teiaiagon, or Taiaiako'n, was a Haudenosaunee village on the east bank of the Humber River in what is now the York district of Toronto, Ontario, Canada. It was located along the Toronto Carrying-Place Trail. The site is near the current intersection of Jane Street and Annette Street, at which is situated the community of Baby Point.

The name's meaning in English is "it crosses the stream".

== History ==
Percy Robinson's Toronto During the French Regime shows Teiaiagon as being a jointly occupied village of Seneca and Mohawk Nations of the Haudenosaunee. Helen Tanner's Atlas of Great Lakes Indian History describes Teiaiagon as a Seneca village around the years 1685-1687. The period of occupation is unknown precisely, but was in place well before that time, judging by what archaeological remains exist.

Étienne Brûlé passed through Teiaiagon in 1615. The village was on an important route for the developing fur trade industry, and it was also "surrounded by horticultural fields". It was said to be about "a day's journey from the Toronto Lake, our present Lake Simcoe".

On November 18, 1678, René-Robert Cavelier, Sieur de La Salle departed Fort Frontenac for Niagara in a brigantine with a crew including La Motte and the Récollet missionary Louis Hennepin, following the north shore of Lake Ontario to mitigate the effects of a storm. The ship was grounded three times, forcing the crew to stop at the mouth of the Humber River on November 26. The surprised inhabitants of the village "were hospitable and supplied them with provisions". On December 5, the ship set off after being cut out of the ice with axes. Before departing, "La Motte's men bartered their commodities with the natives" for corn.

Victor Conrad assumes that the village has 20-30 structures, a number consistent with Haudenosaunee villages south of Lake Ontario. Based on this, he estimates that the village had a population of 500 to 800. Robertson David notes that any further demographic guesses are speculation. La Salle camped at the village several other times, once in the summer of 1680, and "perhaps twice in 1681" during his expeditions. There was a 10-acre (40,000 m^{2}) burial ground located in the central part of the village.

The Senecas left the village, either pushed out by, or voluntarily for, the Mississaugas by 1701. The Ojibwe oral tradition is that they attacked the Haudenosee and were victorious. The Taiaiako'n Historical Preservation Society and other sources state that the village was destroyed by the French led by Marquis de Denonville, Governor General of New France. In 1687, De Denonville led a campaign against the Five Nations and was known to have stopped at the Humber River mouth in 1687, as well as the Rouge River to the east near Ganatsekwyagon.

With the removal of the Haudenosaunee from the north shore of Lake Ontario, the Anishinaabe and French trade began to flourish in the region shortly after the Great Peace of Montreal of 1701. Associated with this trade, there was a very small French garrison or Magasin Royal located near the site of Teiaiagon from 1720 to 1730. In 1730, the French garrison was located downriver of the site. A store was later built at the mouth of the Humber in 1750 and Fort Rouillé soon after, east of the Humber.

The Mississaugas did not live at the site of the village of Teiaiagon, but had a village located across the Humber River, on the west bank of the river, near Old Mill Road and Bloor Street, from 1788-1805. James Bâby from Detroit in 1816 acquired the land now called Baby Point and only had orchards located on the site of Teiaiagon. The site was relatively undisturbed as it was not farmed. The Teiaiagon area was acquired by the government for a military fortress and army barracks, but then was sold to Robert Home Smith, who began developing the Baby Point subdivision in 1912. In 1949, at the south-west corner of Baby Point Road and Baby Point Crescent, a plaque was erected, briefly mentioning "Taiaiagon."

== Cartography ==
Possibly because early European explorers had difficulty in transcribing First Nations names into European orthographic systems, numerous spelling variations exist. These include Taiaiako'n, Taiaiagon, Teyeyagon, and Toioiugon.

The name "Teiaigon" appears on a 1688 map of New France drawn by Jean-Baptiste-Louis Franquelin based on "sixteen years' of observation of the author". It was indicated to be on the eastern side of a small bay, from which a portage route led to the west branch of Lake Taronto.

== Archeology ==
Excavations at Baby Point were first conducted in the late nineteenth century. Records from that excavation have been lost, though it is known that they revealed "traces of palisade walls". In the late 1990s and early 2000s another excavation, conducted as a result of installation of a natural gas line to the residential neighbourhood, discovered the burial plots of two Seneca women, which were dated to the 1680s. One of the women was buried with a moose antler comb engraved with a rattlesnake-tailed panther, "possibly representing Mishipizheu", which morphs into a bear. The other woman was buried with three brass rings and a carved moose antler comb depicting "two human figures wearing European-style clothes flanking an Aboriginal figure". Another burial plot on Baby Point was found in 2010 when a house was being renovated. Artifacts were studied and a ceremonial reburial took place.

Just north of the site, in today's Magwood Park, is "Thunderbird Mound", which is believed to be an ancient burial mound. The site has not been studied for its archaeology. The site is considered threatened by erosion and pedestrian traffic by the Taiaiako'n Historical Preservation Society.

== Haudenosaunee villages on the north shore of Lake Ontario ==
By the late 1660s, the Five Nation Haudenosaunee had established seven villages along the shores of Lake Ontario where trails led off into the interior. In addition to Teiaiagon at the mouth of the Humber River, the following settlements have been identified by historian Percy James Robinson:

- Ganneious - on the site of present-day Napanee
- Kente - on the Bay of Quinte
- Kentsio - on Rice Lake
- Ganaraske - on the site of present-day Port Hope
- Ganatsekwyagon - at the mouth of the Rouge River
- Quinaouatoua (or Tinawatawa) - Near modern-day Hamilton

== See also ==
- Bead Hill
- York, Upper Canada
