= Mark Saunders =

Mark Saunders may refer to:

- Mark Saunders (police officer) (born 1962), former Toronto Chief of Police
- Mark Saunders (record producer) (born 1959), British record producer
- Mark Saunders (footballer) (born 1971), English football player
- Mark Saunders, former bassist of the indie group Florence and the Machine
- Mark Saunders (1976–2008), English barrister and criminal shot dead by police; see Death of Mark Saunders

== See also ==
- Mark Sanders (disambiguation)
