= Parkdale—High Park (provincial electoral district) =

Canadian provincial electoral district in the city of Toronto, Ontario, Canada

Ontario electoral district
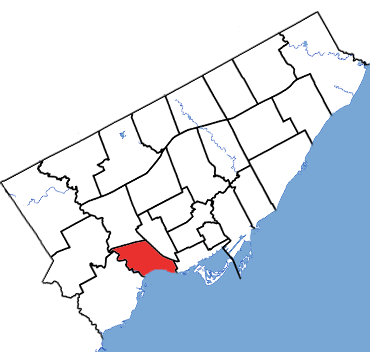
- Parkdale—High Park in relation to the other Toronto ridings
- Coordinates: 43.65°N 79.47°W; Coordinates for the centre of the district

Provincial electoral district
- Legislature: Legislative Assembly of Ontario
MPP
Alexa Gilmour
New Democratic
- District created: 1996
- First contested: 1999
- Last contested: 2025

Demographics
- Population (2016): 108,805
- Electors (2018): 88,131
- Area (km²): 16
- Pop. density (per km²): 6,800.3
- Census division: Toronto
- Census subdivision: Toronto

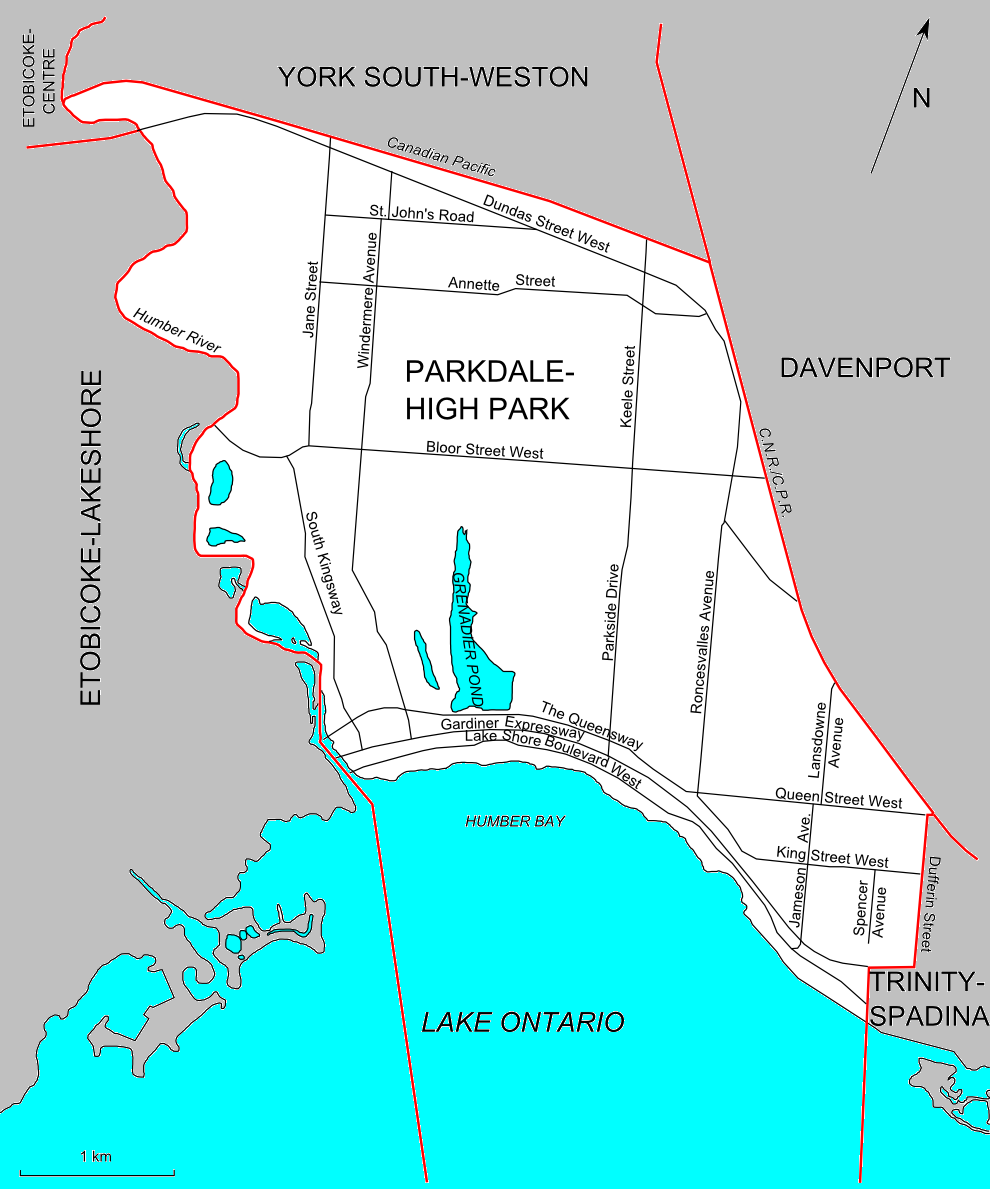
Map of Parkdale—High Park

Parkdale—High Park is a provincial electoral district in Toronto, Ontario, Canada, created in 1996 and represented in the Legislative Assembly of Ontario since 1999. It is located in Toronto's west end, bordering on the lakefront to the south, the Humber River to the west, and the Canadian Pacific Railway tracks essentially defining its northern and eastern borders. There are 107,035 residents in the district. (Note: The figure is a sum of the population of the two city wards that occupy Parkdale-High Park. The total may be underrepresented by as much as 5% due to "census undercoverage".) Federally the electoral district is held by Member of Parliament (MP) Karim Bardeesy, provincially by Member of Provincial Parliament (MPP) Alexa Gilmour and municipally by city councillor Gord Perks (Ward 4).

== Boundaries ==
=== 2007 and 2011 elections ===
It consists of the part of the city of Toronto bounded on the south by Lake Ontario, on the west by the Humber River, and on the north and east by a line drawn from the Humber River east along the Canadian Pacific Railway, southeast along the Canadian National/Canadian Pacific Railway to Queen Street West, south along Dufferin Street to the Gardiner expressway; then westerly along said expressway to the southerly production of Spencer Street, and south along the Spencer production to the city limits in Lake Ontario. The boundary then moves westerly along the city limits to the production of the Humber River; then generally it moves northwesterly following the river back to the commencement point at the intersection of the river and the railway tracks.

=== 1999, 2003, 2006 elections ===
The district was constituted from parts of the old city of Toronto and the former city of York. It started at the intersection of the westerly limit of York with the Canadian Pacific Railway; then went easterly along the railway to the Canadian National Railway; from there it went southeasterly along the Canadian National Railway to the northerly production of Atlantic Avenue; then southerly along said production, Atlantic Avenue and its southerly production to the Gardiner Expressway; thence westerly along the Gardiner Expressway to the southerly production of Spencer Avenue; then southerly along the southerly production of Spencer Avenue to the southerly limit of the Toronto in Lake Ontario. The boundary then moves westerly along the city limits to the production of the Humber River; then generally it moves northwesterly following the river back to the commencement point at the intersection of the river and the railway tracks.

=== Neighbourhoods ===
Parkdale—High Park encompasses seven neighbourhoods surrounding High Park. Including the park and portions west, between the north and south borders of the park is the neighbourhood of Swansea; north of the park are the neighbourhoods of High Park North and the south half of The Junction; north-west of the park are the neighbourhoods of Runnymede-Bloor West Village and Lambton Baby Point; to the east of the park is Roncesvalles; and Parkdale directly to the south and to the south-east.

== History ==
Parkdale—High Park was created in 1996 when provincial districts were defined to have the same borders as federal electoral districts. It had previously been represented by portions of the High Park—Swansea, Parkdale, and York South districts.

Gerard Kennedy, a member of the Ontario Liberal Party, was the first MPP elected from this district, after he won the seat in the 1999 Ontario general election. He was re-elected in the subsequent 2003 Ontario general election that elected a Liberal majority government. Kennedy served as Minister of Education in that government until he resigned in 2006 to run for the federal Liberal Party leadership, precipitating the September 14, 2006 by-election that was won by DiNovo.

Cheri DiNovo, a member of the New Democratic Party (NDP), became the district's MPP after the September 14, 2006 by-election caused by Kennedy's resignation from the Legislature. DiNovo was re-elected in the 2007, 2011 and 2014 Ontario general elections before retiring from politics in 2017 to become minister of Trinity-St. Paul's United Church.

After DiNovo's departure, Bhutila Karpoche, a member of the New Democratic Party, was elected in the 2018 Ontario general election. Karpoche was re-elected in the 2022 Ontario general election. In 2024, Karpoche announced that she would not be seeking re-election as an MPP and instead seeking the federal NDP nomination for the next federal election.

== Members of Provincial Parliament ==
| Assembly | Years | Member | Party |
|---|---|---|---|
Riding created from High Park—Swansea, Parkdale and York South
| 37th | 1999–2003 | Gerard Kennedy | Liberal |
| 38th | 2003–2006 | Gerard Kennedy | Liberal |
| 38th | 2006–2007 | Cheri DiNovo | New Democratic |
| 39th | 2007–2011 | Cheri DiNovo | New Democratic |
| 40th | 2011–2014 | Cheri DiNovo | New Democratic |
| 41st | 2014–2017 | Cheri DiNovo | New Democratic |
| 42nd | 2018–2022 | Bhutila Karpoche | New Democratic |
| 43rd | 2022–2025 | Bhutila Karpoche | New Democratic |
| 44th | 2025–present | Alexa Gilmour | New Democratic |
Sourced from the Ontario Legislative Assembly

== Election results ==
Winning party in each polling division of Parkdale—High Park at the 2025 Ontario general election

2025 Ontario general election
| Party | Candidate | Votes | % | ±% | Expenditures |
|---|---|---|---|---|---|
| New Democratic | Alexa Gilmour | 20,508 | 45.35 | –8.61 | $119,712 |
| Liberal | Nadia Guerrera | 13,941 | 30.83 | +8.45 | $103,894 |
| Progressive Conservative | Justine Teplycky | 8,058 | 17.82 | +3.12 | $16,937 |
| Green | Anna Gorka | 1,968 | 4.35 | –1.71 | $0 |
| New Blue | Geoffrey Corfield | 462 | 1.02 | –0.24 | $0 |
| Communist | Rimmy Riarh | 283 | 0.63 | +0.11 | $0 |
| Total valid votes/expense limit | | 45,220 | 99.53 | – | $141,770 |
| Total rejected, unmarked and declined ballots | | 214 | 0.47 | –0.06 | |
| Turnout | | 45,434 | 51.82 | +1.56 | |
| Eligible voters | | 87,683 | | | |
| New Democratic hold | | Swing | | –8.53 | |
Source: Elections Ontario

Winning party in each polling division of Parkdale—High Park at the 2022 Ontario general election

2022 Ontario general election
| Party | Candidate | Votes | % | ±% | Expenditures |
|---|---|---|---|---|---|
| New Democratic | Bhutila Karpoche | 23,024 | 53.97 | –5.44 | $114,469 |
| Liberal | Karim Bardeesy | 9,547 | 22.38 | +5.38 | $118,634 |
| Progressive Conservative | Monika Frejlich | 6,270 | 14.70 | –3.31 | $12,433 |
| Green | Patrick Macklem | 2,587 | 6.06 | +1.40 | $2,663 |
| New Blue | Danielle Height | 537 | 1.26 | – | $0 |
| Ontario Party | Craig Peskett | 349 | 0.82 | – | $0 |
| Communist | Gunes Agduk | 221 | 0.52 | +0.27 | $0 |
| People's Political Party | Oliver Roberts | 129 | 0.30 | – | $0 |
| Total valid votes/expense limit | | 42,664 | 99.47 | – | $120,799 |
| Total rejected, unmarked and declined ballots | | 228 | 0.53 | –0.33 | |
| Turnout | | 42,892 | 50.25 | –12.18 | |
| Eligible voters | | 85,352 | | | |
| New Democratic hold | | Swing | | –5.41 | |
Source: Elections Ontario

2018 Ontario general election
| Party | Candidate | Votes | % | ±% |
|---|---|---|---|---|
| New Democratic | Bhutila Karpoche | 32,407 | 59.41 | +18.64 |
| Progressive Conservative | Adam Pham | 9,821 | 18.00 | +5.17 |
| Liberal | Nadia Guerrera | 9,271 | 17.00 | –22.57 |
| Green | Halyna Zalucky | 2,544 | 4.66 | –0.83 |
| Libertarian | Matthias Nunno | 371 | 0.68 | +0.26 |
| Communist | Jay Watts | 135 | 0.25 | – |
| Total valid votes | | 54,549 | 99.14 | |
| Total rejected, unmarked and declined ballots | | 474 | 0.86 | –0.20 |
| Turnout | | 55,023 | 62.43 | +5.55 |
| Eligible voters | | 88,131 | | |
| New Democratic hold | | Swing | | +6.73 |
Source: Elections Ontario

2014 Ontario general election
| Party | Candidate | Votes | % | ±% |
|---|---|---|---|---|
| New Democratic | Cheri DiNovo | 18,385 | 40.77 | –5.43 |
| Liberal | Nancy Leblanc | 17,841 | 39.56 | +2.14 |
| Progressive Conservative | Jamie Ellerton | 5,787 | 12.83 | +1.09 |
| Green | Tim Rudkins | 2,479 | 5.50 | +2.16 |
| None of the Above | Matthew Vezina | 305 | 0.68 | – |
| Libertarian | Redmond Weissenberger | 191 | 0.42 | –0.01 |
| Freedom | Melanie Motz | 105 | 0.23 | – |
| Total valid votes | | 45,093 | 98.94 | |
| Total rejected, unmarked and declined ballots | | 483 | 1.06 | +0.54 |
| Turnout | | 45,576 | 56.88 | +5.10 |
| Eligible voters | | 80,122 | | |
| New Democratic hold | | Swing | | –3.78 |
Source: Elections Ontario

2011 Ontario general election
| Party | Candidate | Votes | % | ±% |
|---|---|---|---|---|
| New Democratic | Cheri DiNovo | 18,365 | 46.20 | +1.49 |
| Liberal | Cortney Pasternak | 14,877 | 37.42 | +8.18 |
| Progressive Conservative | Joe Ganetakos | 4,668 | 11.74 | –3.06 |
| Green | Justin Trottier | 1,325 | 3.33 | –6.34 |
| Libertarian | Rod Rojas | 172 | 0.43 | –0.37 |
| Independent | Bohdan Ewhen Radejewsky | 88 | 0.22 | – |
| Independent | George Babula | 84 | 0.21 | – |
| Independent | Cecilia Luu | 78 | 0.20 | – |
| People's Political Party | Thomas Zaugg | 56 | 0.14 | – |
| Independent | Istvan Tar | 39 | 0.10 | – |
| Total valid votes | | 39,752 | 99.48 | |
| Total rejected, unmarked and declined ballots | | 207 | 0.52 | –0.16 |
| Turnout | | 39,959 | 51.79 | –5.65 |
| Eligible voters | | 77,163 | | |
| New Democratic hold | | Swing | | –3.35 |
Source: Elections Ontario

2007 Ontario general election
| Party | Candidate | Votes | % | ±% |
|---|---|---|---|---|
| New Democratic | Cheri DiNovo | 18,194 | 44.71 | +3.76 |
| Liberal | Sylvia Watson | 11,900 | 29.24 | –3.68 |
| Progressive Conservative | David Hutcheon | 6,024 | 14.80 | –2.53 |
| Green | Bruce Hearns | 3,938 | 9.68 | +3.40 |
| Libertarian | Zork Hun | 326 | 0.80 | +0.23 |
| Family Coalition | Marilee Kidd | 312 | 0.77 | –0.52 |
| Total valid votes | | 40,694 | 99.33 | |
| Total rejected, unmarked and declined ballots | | 276 | 0.67 | –0.01 |
| Turnout | | 40,970 | 57.43 | +18.27 |
| Eligible voters | | 71,333 | | |
| New Democratic hold | | Swing | | +3.72 |
Source: Elections Ontario

Ontario provincial by-election, September 14, 2006 Resignation of Gerard Kennedy
| Party | Candidate | Votes | % | ±% |
|---|---|---|---|---|
| New Democratic | Cheri DiNovo | 11,677 | 40.95 | +25.18 |
| Liberal | Sylvia Watson | 9,387 | 32.92 | –24.91 |
| Progressive Conservative | David Hutcheon | 4,943 | 17.33 | +1.16 |
| Green | Frank de Jong | 1,789 | 6.27 | –0.66 |
| Family Coalition | Stan Grzywna | 367 | 1.29 | –0.20 |
| Libertarian | Jim McIntosh | 164 | 0.58 | – |
| Freedom | Silvio Ursomarzo | 111 | 0.39 | –0.03 |
| Independent | John Turmel | 78 | 0.27 | – |
| Total valid votes | | 28,516 | 99.32 | |
| Total rejected, unmarked and declined ballots | | 196 | 0.68 | –0.25 |
| Turnout | | 28,712 | 39.16 | –15.77 |
| Eligible voters | | 73,314 | | |
| New Democratic gain from Liberal | | Swing | | +12.01 |
Source: Elections Ontario

2003 Ontario general election
| Party | Candidate | Votes | % | ±% | Expenditures |
|---|---|---|---|---|---|
| Liberal | Gerard Kennedy | 23,008 | 57.83 | +2.91 | $40,269.51 |
| Progressive Conservative | Stephen Snell | 6,436 | 16.18 | –13.99 | $38,656.44 |
| New Democratic | Margo Duncan | 6,275 | 15.77 | +3.99 | $12,018.40 |
| Green | Neil Spiegel | 2,758 | 6.93 | +5.74 | $21,119.32 |
| Family Coalition | Stan J. Grzywna | 591 | 1.49 | +0.80 | $161.00 |
| Communist | Karin Larsen | 349 | 0.88 | – | $857.38 |
| Independent | John Brian Steele | 204 | 0.51 | – | $107.66 |
| Freedom | Richard (Dick) Field | 165 | 0.41 | – | $0.00 |
| Total valid votes | | 39,786 | 99.06 | | |
| Total rejected, unmarked and declined ballots | | 376 | 0.94 | –0.14 | |
| Turnout | | 40,162 | 54.94 | –5.52 | |
| Eligible voters | | 73,108 | | | |
| Liberal hold | | Swing | | +8.45 | |
Source: Elections Ontario

1999 Ontario general election
| Party | Candidate | Votes | % | Expenditures |
|---|---|---|---|---|
| Liberal | Gerard Kennedy | 23,022 | 54.92 | $63,007.91 |
| Progressive Conservative | Annamarie Castrilli | 12,647 | 30.17 | $57,256.00 |
| New Democratic | Irene Atkinson | 4,937 | 11.78 | $31,655.28 |
| Green | Frank de Jong | 500 | 1.19 | $66.19 |
| Libertarian | Doug Burn | 325 | 0.78 | $1,060.80 |
| Family Coalition | Stan J. Grzywna | 289 | 0.69 | $18.00 |
| Natural Law | J. Lynne Hea | 99 | 0.24 | $0.00 |
| Independent (Humanist) | Jorge van Schouwen | 99 | 0.24 | $0.00 |
| Total valid votes | | 41,918 | 98.93 | |
| Total rejected, unmarked and declined ballots | | 454 | 1.07 | |
| Turnout | | 42,372 | 60.45 | |
| Eligible voters | | 70,091 | | |
| Liberal pickup new district. | | | | |
Source: Elections Ontario

== Student vote results ==
2022 Parkdale—High Park student vote result
| Affiliation | Candidate | Votes | % |
| New Democratic | Bhutila Karpoche | 1,016 | 49.93 |
| Liberal | Karim Bardeesy | 374 | 18.38 |
| Green | Patrick Macklem | 262 | 12.87 |
| Communist | Gunes Agduk | 157 | 7.71 |
| Progressive Conservative | Monika Frejlich | 102 | 5.01 |
| New Blue | Danielle Height | 44 | 2.16 |
| Ontario Party | Craig Peskett | 41 | 2.01 |
| People's Political Party | Oliver Roberts | 39 | 1.92 |
Source: Student Vote

== 2007 electoral reform referendum ==
2007 Ontario electoral reform referendum
| Side | Votes | % |
|---|---|---|
| First Past the Post | 17,741 | 45.5 |
| Mixed member proportional (Note: This riding was one of five ridings where a majority of voters supported MMP.) | 21,207 | 54.5 |
| Total valid votes | 38,948 | 100.0 |

== See also ==
- List of Ontario provincial electoral districts
- Canadian provincial electoral districts
