= Karim Bardeesy =

Canadian politician

Karim Bardeesy MP

Parliamentary Secretary to the Minister of Industry
- Incumbent
- Assumed office June 5, 2025

Member of Parliament
- Incumbent
- Assumed office April 28, 2025
- Preceded by: Electoral district created
- Constituency: Taiaiko'n—Parkdale—High Park

Personal details
- Party: Liberal
- Website: karimbardeesy.ca

Karim Bardeesy MP is a Canadian politician from the Liberal Party of Canada. He currently serves as the Member of Parliament for Taiaiko'n—Parkdale—High Park and as Parliamentary Secretary to the Minister of Industry.

== Background ==
Bardeesy is a former journalist, policy advisor and professor who was most recently executive director of the Dais, a Toronto Metropolitan University public policy think tank working on technology, education, and democracy.

He has previously served as Deputy Principal Secretary to the Premier of Ontario, Kathleen Wynne. as well as Executive Director of Policy under Dalton McGuinty.

== Political career ==
During the 2022 Ontario general election, Bardeesy was the Ontario Liberal Party candidate for the provincial electoral district of Parkdale—High Park, losing to Bhutila Karpoche.

Following the retirement of Arif Virani, he ran in the newly-created federal electoral district of Taiaiako'n—Parkdale—High Park in the 2025 Canadian federal election, winning in a rematch against Karpoche.

In the Carney ministry, he serves as Parliamentary Secretary to the Minister of Industry.

== Personal life ==
Bardeesy is of Egyptian Arab descent and grew up in Bathurst, New Brunswick. He lives in Roncevalles Village with his wife Rachel Pulfer and two children.

He holds a Bachelor of Arts (BA) in political science from McGill University and a Master of Public Policy (MPP) from Harvard Kennedy School.

== Electoral record ==
2025 Canadian federal election: Taiaiako'n—Parkdale—High Park
| Party | Candidate | Votes | % | ±% | Expenditures |
|---|---|---|---|---|---|
| Liberal | Karim Bardeesy | 36,439 | 55.80 | +13.01 | |
| New Democratic | Bhutila Karpoche | 15,003 | 22.97 | –15.43 | |
| Conservative | Wladyslaw Lizon | 12,662 | 19.40 | +6.07 | |
| Green | Anna Gorka | 700 | 1.1 | –0.84 | |
| Animal Protection | Edward Fraser | 184 | 0.28 | N/A | |
| Communist | Rimmy Riarh | 137 | 0.21 | N/A | |
| Marijuana | Terry Parker | 96 | 0.15 | N/A | |
| Marxist–Leninist | Lorne Gershuny | 92 | 0.14 | N/A | |
| Total valid votes/expense limit | | 65,313 | | | |
| Total rejected ballots | | 299 | | | |
| Turnout | | 65,612 | 71.30 | | |
| Eligible voters | | 92,011 | | | |
| Liberal notional hold | | Swing | | +14.22 | |
Source: Elections Canada

2022 Ontario general election: Parkdale—High Park
| Party | Candidate | Votes | % | ±% | Expenditures |
|---|---|---|---|---|---|
| New Democratic | Bhutila Karpoche | 23,024 | 53.97 | –5.44 | $114,469 |
| Liberal | Karim Bardeesy | 9,547 | 22.38 | +5.38 | $118,634 |
| Progressive Conservative | Monika Frejlich | 6,270 | 14.70 | –3.31 | $12,433 |
| Green | Patrick Macklem | 2,587 | 6.06 | +1.40 | $2,663 |
| New Blue | Danielle Height | 537 | 1.26 | – | $0 |
| Ontario Party | Craig Peskett | 349 | 0.82 | – | $0 |
| Communist | Gunes Agduk | 221 | 0.52 | +0.27 | $0 |
| People's Political Party | Oliver Roberts | 129 | 0.30 | – | $0 |
| Total valid votes/expense limit | | 42,664 | 99.47 | – | $120,799 |
| Total rejected, unmarked and declined ballots | | 228 | 0.53 | –0.33 | |
| Turnout | | 42,892 | 50.25 | –12.18 | |
| Eligible voters | | 85,352 | | | |
| New Democratic hold | | Swing | | –5.41 | |
Source: Elections Ontario
