= Alexa Gilmour =

Canadian politician

Alexa Gilmour MPP
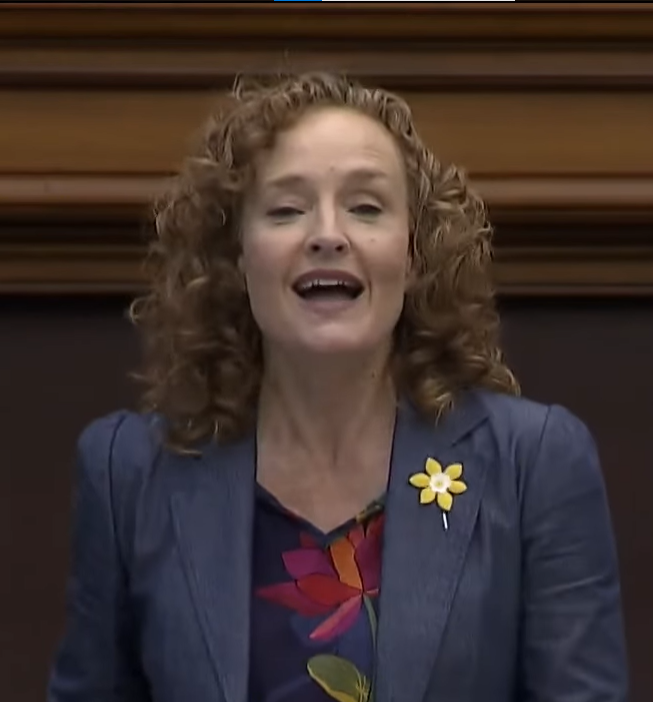
- Gilmour in 2025

Member of the Ontario Provincial Parliament for Parkdale—High Park
- Incumbent
- Assumed office February 27, 2025
- Preceded by: Bhutila Karpoche

Personal details
- Party: ONDP

Alexa Gilmour is a Canadian politician from the New Democratic Party of Ontario.

She was a minister at Windermere United Church for a decade before entering politics.

In the 2025 Ontario general election, she was elected to the Legislative Assembly of Ontario in Parkdale—High Park, succeeding previous MPP Bhutila Karpoche.

== Electoral record ==
2025 Ontario general election
Party	Candidate	Votes	%	±%	Expenditures
New Democratic	Alexa Gilmour	20,508	45.35	-8.62	$119,712
Liberal	Nadia Guerrera	13,941	30.83	+8.45	$103,894
Progressive Conservative	Justine Teplycky	8,058	17.82	+3.12	$16,937
Green	Anna Gorka	1,968	4.35	-1.71	$0
New Blue	Geoffrey Corfield	462	1.02	-0.24	$0
Communist	Rimmy Riarh	283	0.63	+0.11	$0
Total valid votes/expense limit		45,220	99.53	+0.06	$141,770
Total rejected, unmarked, and declined ballots		214	0.47	–0.06	
Turnout		45,434	52.49	+2.24	
Eligible voters		86,556			
New Democratic hold		Swing		–8.54	
Source: Elections Ontario

== See also ==
- 44th Parliament of Ontario
