= Percy James Robinson =

Canadian historian

Percy J. Robinson
- Born: October 18, 1873; Whitby, Ontario, Canada
- Died: June 19, 1953 (aged 79); Toronto, Ontario, Canada
- Occupations: Professor, historian, artist
- Spouse: Esther de Beauregard (m. 1905–1953)
- Writing career
- Genres: History, translation

Percy James Robinson (October 18, 1873 – June 19, 1953) was a Canadian professor of classical literature. He was also an historian, a translator of French literature and an amateur painter of some repute.

== Biography ==
Robinson was born in Whitby, Ontario but spent most of his life in Toronto. He attended the University of Toronto where he obtained his BA in 1897 and MA in 1902. In 1899 he joined the staff of St. Andrew's College, Aurora as a professor teaching Latin and Greek. He stayed at the college until his retirement in 1946.

He studied languages relating to the indigenous tribes of Ontario and which led him to further research and the publication of Toronto During the French Régime in 1934. He also translated the French Jesuit François Du Creux's Historiae Canadensis (1664) in 1951. He was elected a fellow of the Royal Society of Canada in 1937. In 1934 the University of Toronto conferred upon him the honorary degree of LL.D.

In addition to his literary pursuits, Robinson was also an accomplished painter. In 1922 an opening occurred in the Group of Seven and he was invited to participate in an exhibition at the Art Gallery of Ontario.

In 1905 he married Esther de Beauregard. They had one son, Gilbert. Robinson died in Toronto in 1953. He is buried in Mount Pleasant Cemetery.

== Works ==
- The Group of Seven, 1923
- Toronto During the French Régime - 1615-1793, 1934 and 1965 (University of Toronto Press)
- The history of Canada or New France, 1951-1952 [translation of François Du Creux's Historiae Canadensis, 1664]
- The Georgian Bay, 1966

Source: Internet Archive, University of Toronto Libraries
