= Tinawatawa =

Former Haudenosaunee village

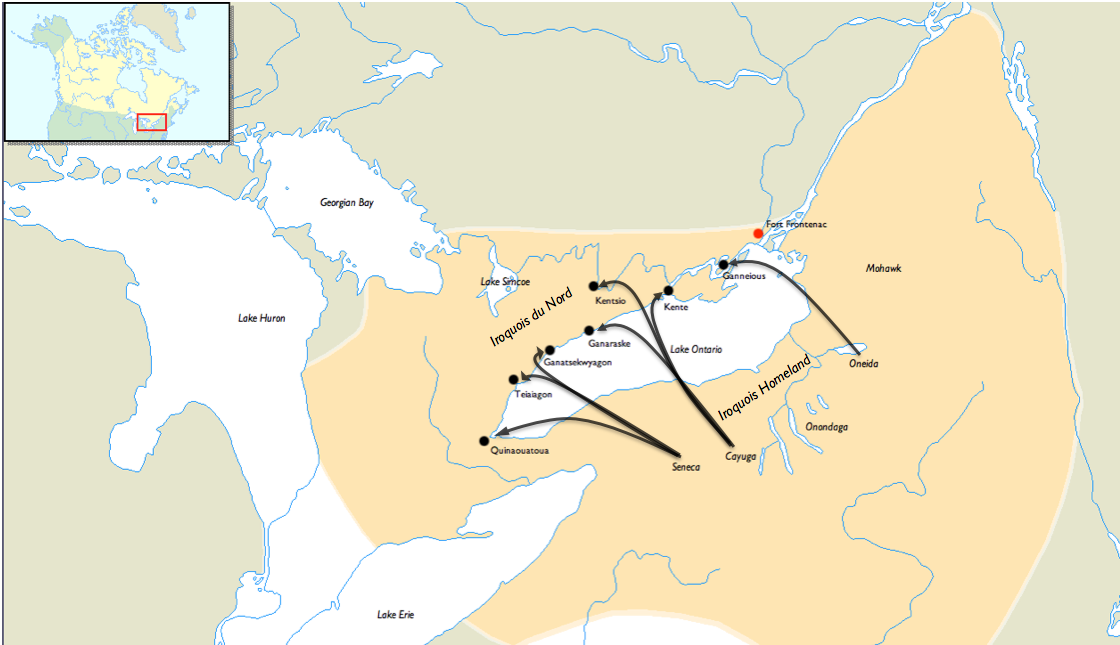
Haudenosaunee settlement of the north shore of Lake Ontario 1665–1701

Tinawatawa, also called Quinaouatoua or Tinaouataoua, was a Haudenosaunee village of the Seneca people on the western end of the Niagara corridor, described as "a fertile flat belt of land stretching from western New York to the head waters of the Thames River". It was located on the western end of Lake Ontario.

== Location ==
Areas around Hamilton where Tinawatawa may have been located

There are a number of theories about where the village was located. (Note: Until the 1960s, it was believed to have been in Aldershot, Ontario near La Salle Park and along the northern shore of Lake Ontario.) One theory is that it was east or northeast of present-day Westover, Ontario, on the north side of Spencer Creek and in Beverly Swamp, which was a winter hunting grounds site. From archaeological studies of what was called the Christianson Site, it was occupied about 1615 to 1630 by Haudenosaunee people.

Other theories are that Tinawatawa was along Ancaster Creek in Ancaster, Ontario, between Dundas and Brantford. It may have been in current day West Flamborough along a high ground trail that is now Regional Road 97. Or, more probably, halfway to Brantford and the Grand River.

== History ==
In the 17th century, what is now Southern Ontario was Huronia. The Lower Great Lakes and Huronia "region was a multicultural landscape composed of conquerors, refugees and dispersed peoples." The Dutch, French, and English competed for trade alliances with indigenous peoples. Explorers and cartographers passed through the area. The Beaver Wars involved Haudenosaunee and Algonguian speaking people. In the 1660s, Tinawatawa was part of the territory held by the Haudenosaunee, but others traveled or ranged through the area. From 1660 to 1690, Tinawatawa was a hub village.

On September 24, 1669, Louis Jolliet and explorer René-Robert Cavelier, Sieur de La Salle met with René de Bréhant de Galinée, François Dollier de Casson, superior of the Sulpicians, and other Sulpicians of Montreal, who were missionaries. The missionaries were exploring the western frontier and looking for a place to establish a mission. They stopped at Tinawatawa to find a guide to take them to the western frontier.

There were 30 years of skirmishes following the 1669 meeting. Tinawatawa was subject to attacks by the French and Ojibwe. By 1701, most of the Haudenosaunee withdrew from southern Ontario.

The original five nations of the Haudenosaunee Confederacy reused former settlements in Southern Ontario, including Tinawatawa, also called Quinaouotuan and Tinaouatoua, or Otinawatawa by historian Francis Parkman.
