= Communist Party of Canada (Marxist–Leninist) candidates in the 2000 Canadian federal election =

The Communist Party of Canada (Marxist-Leninist) fielded 84 candidates in the 2000 federal election, none of whom were elected.

== Ontario ==
=== Hamilton West: Wendell Fields ===
Fields received 61 votes, finishing tenth against Liberal incumbent Stan Keyes.

=== Ottawa—Vanier: Kim Roberge ===
Kim Roberge was born in Notre-Dame-de-Pierreville, Quebec, and majored in sociology at the University of Ottawa. She was twenty years old in 1998, when she was interviewed by the Ottawa Citizen newspaper about her participation in International Women's Day activities. In 1999, she represented the Communist Youth Union of Canada (Marxist-Leninist) and other youth groups at a commemoration ceremony for party founder Hardial Bains.

Roberge has been a Marxist-Leninist candidate at both the federal and provincial levels. She listed herself as a receptionist in 2000.

Electoral record
Election	Division	Party	Votes	%	Place	Winner
1998 Quebec provincial	Chapleau	Marxist-Leninist	59	0.14	6/6	Benoît Pelletier, Liberal
2000 federal	Ottawa—Vanier	Marxist-Leninist	74	0.15	9/9	Mauril Belanger, Liberal

=== Parkdale—High Park: Lorne Gershuny ===
Lorne Gershuny was the party's candidate in Parkdale—High Park in the 2000 federal election receiving 122 votes. He was also the CPC-ML standard-bearer in the same riding in the 2004 federal election, garnering 130 votes, & in the 2006 federal election, garnering 133 votes.

In 2002, Gershuny was a member of the Canadian delegation to the 8th International Fact-Finding Mission of the Korea Truth Commission, which visited the Democratic People's Republic of Korea in support of the North Korean government.

He remains active with the Canadian chapter of the Korean Truth Commission and argues against foreign intervention against the Communist state. He is also co-ordinator of the Lawyer's Committee for the Anti-Terrorist Cuban Five, and is active with the People's Front Organization of Canada (a CPC-ML front group). In his legal practice, Gershuny has taken on several political cases defending members of the Kitchener Waterloo Youth Collective and Anti-Racist Action.

Lorne Gershuny's brother, David Gershuny is also a member of the CPC-ML and has been a candidate on four occasions.

== See also ==
- Communist Party of Canada (Marxist-Leninist)
