= January 1950 Toronto municipal election =

January 1950 Toronto mayoral election
- January 2, 1950
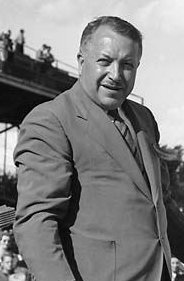

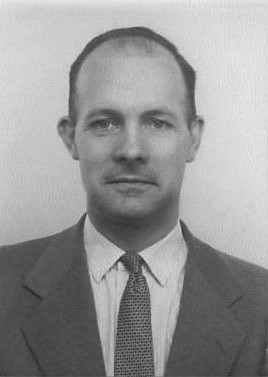
| Candidate | Hiram E. McCallum | Charles Mahoney | Ross Dowson |
| Popular vote | 133,320 | 19,658 | 15,600 |
| Percentage | 79% | 11% | 9% |
Mayor of Toronto before election
Hiram E. McCallum
Elected Mayor of Toronto
Hiram E. McCallum

Municipal elections were held in Toronto, Ontario, Canada, on January 2, 1950. This was the last time election were held in January, as a ballot measure passed changing the election date to the first Monday in December. This attempt to increase turnout went into effect immediately and an election was held December 4, 1950. The central issue of the campaign was whether to legalize sport on Sundays, with Controller Allan Lamport the main proponent. A referendum was held on the subject, and it passed by a slim margin.

== Toronto mayor ==
Incumbent Hiram E. McCallum easily won reelection against two minor candidates, former police officer Charles Mahoney and Trotskyist Ross Dowson.

Results
Hiram E. McCallum – 133,320
Charles H. Mahoney – 19,658
Ross Dowson – 15,600

== Board of Control ==
All sitting members of the Board of Control chose to run for reelection. Alderman Louis Shannon attempted to win a seat, but finished fifth.

Results
John Innes (incumbent) – 96,139
Leslie Saunders (incumbent) – 87,799
David Balfour (incumbent) – 78,090
Allan Lamport (incumbent) – 72,436
Louis Shannon – 72,059
Stewart Smith – 45,251
Harry Bradley- 21,719
Frederick Vacher – 9,850

== City council ==
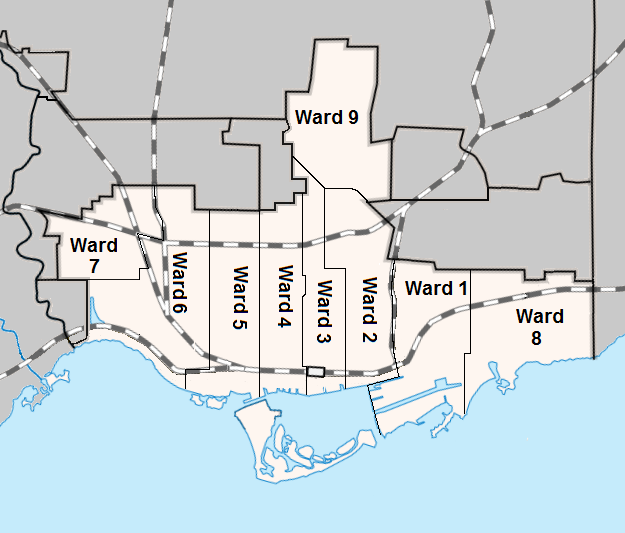
Ward boundaries used in the 1950 election

Ward 1 (Riverdale)
John McMechan (incumbent) – 9,328
William Allen – 8,512
Kenneth Waters – 8,060
Roy Cadwell – 3,299
Harry Marley – 2,263

Ward 2 (Cabbagetown and Rosedale)
Joseph Cornish – 6,237
Beverley Sparling – 5,642
May Birchard – 5,560
Sylvester Perry – 2,064
William MacKenzie – 1,422
Harold West – 692

Ward 3 (West Downtown and Summerhill)
Harold Fishleigh (incumbent) – acclaimed
Howard Phillips (incumbent) – acclaimed

Ward 4 (The Annex, Kensington Market and Garment District)
Nathan Phillips (incumbent) – 7,941
Norman Freed (incumbent) – 6,553
Francis Chambers – 6,319
Alfred Whiskin – 649
Francis Love – 648

Ward 5 (Trinity-Bellwoods)
Joseph Gould – 10,252
Arthur Frost (incumbent) – 10,110
Charles Sims (incumbent) – 8,462
Pat McKeown – 1,086

Ward 6 (Davenport and Parkdale)
George Granell (incumbent) – 15,029
Lester Nelson – 8,299
William Duckworth – 7,971
Robert Colucci – 7,573
Dewar Ferguson – 5,596
Harry Branscombe – 3,720

Ward 7 (West Toronto Junction)
William Davidson – 8,727
Alfred Cowling (incumbent) – 8,005
David Sanderson – 5,989

Ward 8 (The Beaches)
Ross Lipsett – 13,686
W.H. Collings (incumbent) – 12,174
Roy Mealing (incumbent) – 9,560
Maurice Punshon – 3,646
William Probert – 3,040
John Square – 968

Ward 9 (North Toronto)
Frank Nash (incumbent) – 15,677
Roy E. Belyea (incumbent) – 15,486
William Mitchell – 10,542

Results taken from the January 3, 1950 Toronto Star and might not exactly match final tallies.
