= 1948 Toronto municipal election =

Municipal elections were held in Toronto, Ontario, Canada, on January 1, 1948. Robert Hood Saunders was re-elected as mayor in an election that also saw no changes on the Board of Control or City Council.

== Toronto mayor ==
Mayor Robert Hood Saunders faced only Trotskyist Ross Dowson and was easily reelected.

Results
Robert Hood Saunders - 118,097
Ross Dowson - 15,008

== Board of Control ==
All four members of the Toronto Board of Control were re-elected.

Results
Hiram E. McCallum (incumbent) - 83,812
John Innes (incumbent) - 80,834
David Balfour (incumbent) - 77,087
Kenneth Bert McKellar (incumbent) - 75,356
Stewart Smith - 47,791
Harry Bradley - 15,711
Harry Clairmont - 4,858

== City council ==
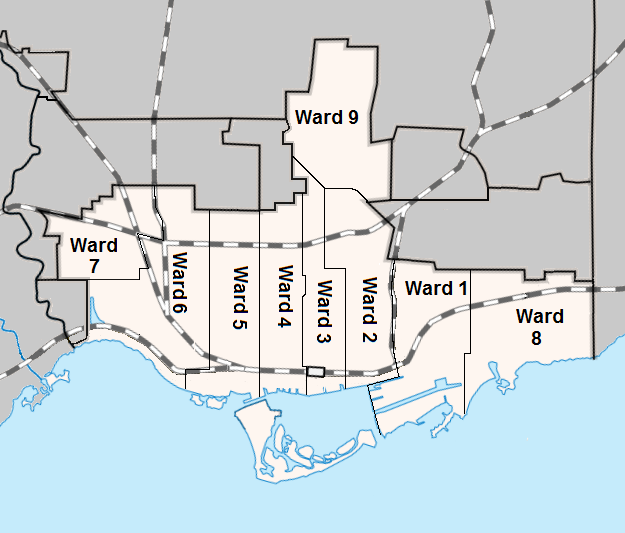
Ward boundaries used in the 1948 election

Ward 1 (Riverdale)
Leslie Saunders (incumbent) - 7,970
Charles Walton (incumbent) - 7,059
Eugene Murdoch - 4,730
Harry Marley - 2,501
Arnold Lorenz - 1,967

Ward 2 (Cabbagetown and Rosedale)
Louis Shannon (incumbent) - 6,628
Everett Weaver (incumbent) - 5,288
May Birchard - 4,048
William Dennison - 2,892
Roy Boskett - 356

Ward 3 (West Downtown and Summerhill)
Harold Fishleigh (incumbent) - 4,712
Allan Lamport (incumbent) - 3,848
Frank Nasso - 943
Will Smith - 514

Ward 4 (The Annex, Kensington Market and Garment District)
Nathan Phillips (incumbent) - 7,346
Norman Freed (incumbent) - 6,304
Francis Chambers - 6,243
William Gallaher - 588

Ward 5 (Trinity-Bellwoods
Arthur Frost (incumbent) - 9,525
Charles Sims (incumbent) - 8,030
Joseph Gould - 7,333
Margaret Luckock - 3,192
Patrick McKeown - 796

Ward 6 (Davenport and Parkdale)
Frank Clifton (incumbent) - 13,924
George Granell (incumbent) - 15,589
Dewar Ferguson - 7,830
Samuel Thomas - 2,331

Ward 7 (West Toronto Junction)
William Butt (incumbent) - 7,629
E.C. Roelofson (incumbent) - 7,115
John Lenglet - 3,259

Ward 8 (The Beaches)
W.H. Collings (incumbent) - acclaimed
Roy Mealing (incumbent) - acclaimed

Ward 9 (North Toronto)
Leonard Reilly (incumbent) - 12,643
Melville Wilson (incumbent) - 11,458
Frank Nash - 9,366

Results taken from the January 2, 1949 Globe and Mail and might not exactly match final tallies. Ward 4 results from January 5, 1948, issue.

== Changes ==
Ward 7 Alderman William Butt died January 10, 1948; Charles Rowntree was appointed replacement January 19.

Mayor Robert Hood Saunders resigned February 23, 1948, when he was appointed chairman of Ontario Hydro; Controller Hiram E. McCallum was unanimously appointed mayor; Ward 7 Alderman E.C. Roelfson was appointed controller February 24; William Davidson appointed alderman March 1, 1948.
