= 1947 Toronto municipal election =

Municipal elections were held in Toronto, Ontario, Canada, on January 1, 1947. With little serious opposition Robert Hood Saunders was re-elected as mayor.

The election was a major defeat for the communist Labor-Progressive Party faction on city council, with Controller Stewart Smith and Alderman Dewar Ferguson being defeated. This left the party with only two seats on city council, Norman Freed and Charles Sims. This was somewhat mitigated by two communists winning seats on the Toronto Board of Education.

The vote also featured three referendums. Two were approved that would have a lasting effect on the city of Toronto. One called for the creation of the Regent Park housing project in the east end of the city. The second approved the city buying up the land northwest of the intersection of Bay and Queen streets for a city square and municipal buildings. This would later be the site of Nathan Phillips Square and Toronto City Hall. Rejected for a third time was a proposal to move to three year municipal terms.

== Toronto mayor ==
Mayor Robert Hood Saunders faced only fringe candidates: Frank O'Hearn, who would go on to found the New Capitalist Party, and Trotskyist Murray Dowson.

Results
Robert Hood Saunders - 92,762
Frank O'Hearn - 9,477
Murray Dowson - 3,180

== Board of Control ==
The only major change on the Board of Control was the defeat of Stewart Smith, the leader of the Communist faction at city hall. He was ousted by North Toronto alderman John Innes.

Results
Hiram E. McCallum (incumbent) - 58,524
John Innes - 53,137
David Balfour (incumbent) - 51,578
Kenneth Bert McKellar (incumbent) - 49,680
Stewart Smith (incumbent)- 42,106
M.A. Sanderson - 26,136
Harry Bradley - 10,749
Harry Clairmont - 4,858

== City council ==
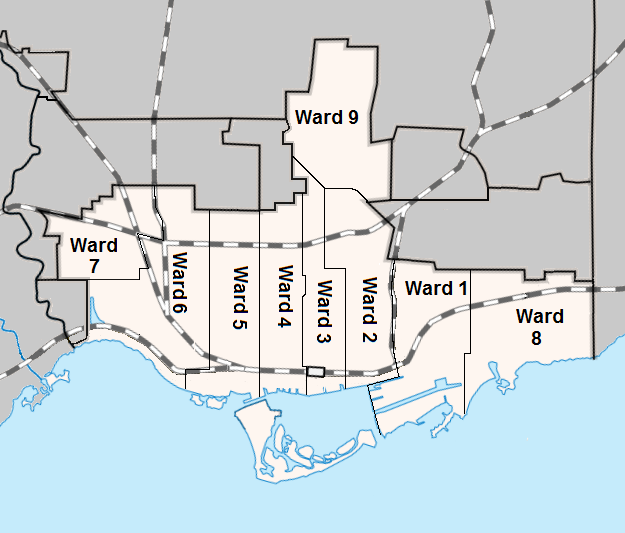
Ward boundaries used in the 1947 election

Ward 1 (Riverdale)
Charles Walton (incumbent) - 4,788
Leslie Saunders - 4,596
William Murdoch (incumbent) - 3,969
W. Simpson - 2,067
Harry Marley - 1,606

Ward 2 (Cabbagetown and Rosedale)
Louis Shannon (incumbent) - 4,102
Everett Weaver - 3,215
May Birchard (incumbent) - 3,079
George A. Wilson - 3,015
William Dennison - 2,248

Ward 3 (West Downtown and Summerhill)
Harold Fishleigh (incumbent) - 3,397
Allan Lamport (incumbent) - 2,884
John McVicar - 1,245
Harry Gilbert - 682
Karl Prager - 271

Ward 4 (The Annex, Kensington Market and Garment District)
Norman Freed (incumbent) - 4,910
Nathan Phillips (incumbent) - 4,690
Francis Chambers - 3,703
C.G. Hamilton - 1,121

Ward 5 (Trinity-Bellwoods
Charles Sims (incumbent) - 7,283
Arthur Frost (incumbent) - 6,848
Margaret Luckock - 4,936
Patrick McKeown - 1,335

Ward 6 (Davenport and Parkdale)
George Granell - 8,526
William Clifton - 6,803
Dewar Ferguson (incumbent) - 5,775
D.J. Bennett - 5,091
Eamon Park - 1,825

Ward 7 (West Toronto Junction)
William Butt (incumbent) - 5,773
E.C. Roelofson (incumbent) - 3,557
J.A. Service - 2,240

Ward 8 (The Beaches)
W.H. Collings (incumbent) - 8,120
Roy Mealing - 5,678
William Howell (incumbent) - 5,319
Murray Cotterill - 4,756
James Davis - 1,522

Ward 9 (North Toronto)
Melville Wilson (incumbent) - 8,307
Leonard Reilly - 6,173
W.H. Harris - 5,999
Alex Thompson - 4,109
H.V. Locke - 3,542
R.M. McLean - 1,480

Results taken from the January 2, 1947 Globe and Mail and might not exactly match final tallies.
