= December 1950 Toronto municipal election =

December 1950 Toronto mayoral election
- December 4, 1950
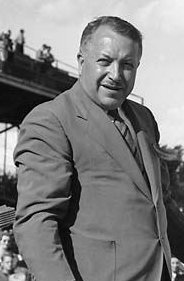

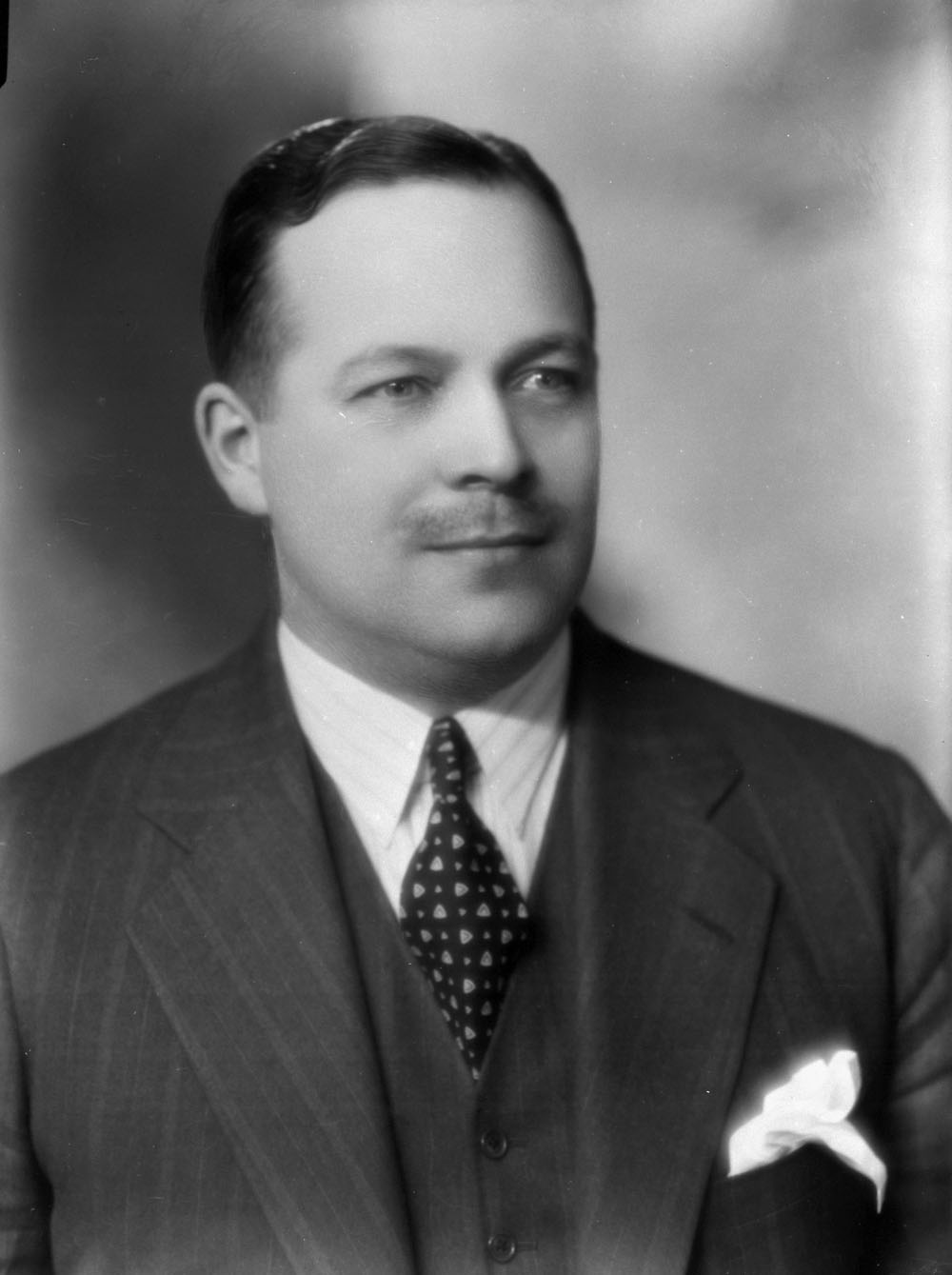
Candidate	Hiram E. McCallum	Allan Lamport
Popular vote	86,491	84,987
Percentage	50.4%	49.5%
Mayor of Toronto before election
Hiram E. McCallum
Elected Mayor of Toronto
Hiram E. McCallum

Municipal elections were held in Toronto, Ontario, Canada, on December 4, 1950. It was the third time the elections were held in December (the 1937 and 1938 terms were elected in December of 1936 and 1937 respectively); traditionally elections occurred on New Year's Day. Incumbent mayor Hiram E. McCallum narrowly defeated Allan Lamport. The defeat of Norman Freed and the failure of Charles Sims to regain his seat would bring to a close the communist Labor-Progressive Party's presence on Toronto's City Council though the party, and its successor, the Communist Party of Canada would continue to elect members as school trustees for several decades.

== Toronto mayor ==
McCallum, running for his fourth one-year term, was challenged by Controller Lamport. McCallum had faced only token opposition in his previous elections, but Lamport came surprisingly close to defeating him. For much of election night it looked as though Lamport would win, but it was swung by McCallum's ten thousand vote margin in the North Toronto Ward 9.

Results
Hiram E. McCallum - 86,491
Allan Lamport - 84,987

== Board of Control ==
Lamport's decision to run for mayor left one vacancy on the Board of Control. This opening was won by Alderman Louis Shannon, with Ford Brand, secretary of the Toronto and District Labour Council finishing fifth and Alderman W.H. Collings in sixth. Former Controller and communist Stewart Smith made another attempt to return to the board, but finished seventh.

Results
John Innes (incumbent) - 93,656
David Balfour (incumbent) - 81,577
Leslie Saunders (incumbent) - 80,703
Louis Shannon - 74,859
Ford Brand - 66,235
W.H. Collings - 59,380
Stewart Smith - 28,309
Charles Henry Mahoney - 8,210
Frederick Vacher - 7,653

== City council ==
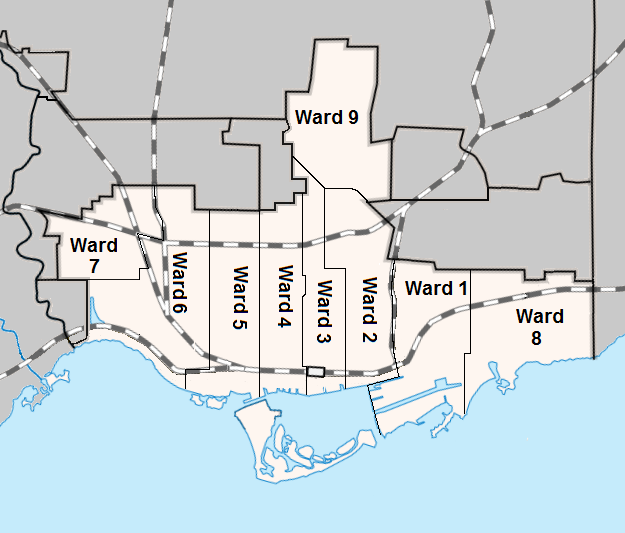
Ward boundaries used in the 1950 election

Ward 1 (Riverdale)
John McMechan (incumbent) - 12,381
William Allen (incumbent) - 12,294
Titchener-Smith - 4,794

Ward 2 (Cabbagetown and Rosedale)
Joseph Cornish (incumbent) - 8,310
Beverley Sparling (incumbent) - 8,061
Sylvester Perry - 3,710

Ward 3 (West Downtown and Summerhill)
Harold Fishleigh (incumbent) - 6,294
Howard Phillips (incumbent) - 8,767
Massey Edwards - 1,938
Probert - 1,440

Ward 4 (The Annex, Kensington Market and Garment District)
Nathan Phillips (incumbent) - 8,767
Francis Chambers - 7,403
Norman Freed (incumbent) - 4,611
Friedman - 2,088
McConnell - 788
Francis Love - 437

Ward 5 (Trinity-Bellwoods)
Arthur Frost (incumbent) - 12,479
Joseph Gould (incumbent) - 12,362
Charles Sims - 5,646
Midanik - 1,585
Haddrall - 784

Ward 6 (Davenport and Parkdale)
Robert Colucci - 15,282
George Granell (incumbent) - 14,609
Lester Nelson (incumbent) - 14,129
Dewar Ferguson - 4,801

Ward 7 (West Toronto Junction)
Alfred Cowling (incumbent) - 8,971
William Davidson (incumbent) - 8,878
David Sanderson - 5,189

Ward 8 (The Beaches)
Ross Lipsett (incumbent) - 17,323
Alex Hodgins - 15,310
William Probert - 4,601
Maurice Punshon - 4,205
John Square - 1,443

Ward 9 (North Toronto)
Frank Nash (incumbent) - 19,493
Roy E. Belyea (incumbent) - 19,488
Lewis - 4,328

Results taken from the December 5, 1950 Toronto Star and might not exactly match final tallies.

== Changes ==
Controller John Innes died July 16, 1951; Ward 7 Alderman Alfred Cowling was appointed Controller September 5 and David Sanderson was appointed Alderman September 17.
