= 1949 Toronto municipal election =

Municipal elections were held in Toronto, Ontario, Canada, on January 1, 1949. Hiram E. McCallum was elected to his first full term as mayor.

== Toronto mayor ==
Mayor Robert Hood Saunders had resigned in 1948 and Controller McCallum was appointed to succeed him. McCallum faced only Trotskyist Ross Dowson in winning his first full term. Dowson won almost 20% in his run, the best result the perennial candidate would ever receive and the best result for an open Trotskyist in a North American election.

Results
Hiram E. McCallum - 97,715
Ross Dowson - 23,777

1949 Toronto mayoral election
- January 1, 1949
- Turnout: Unknown
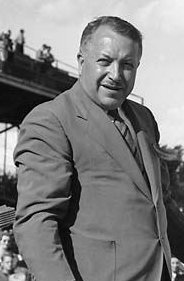

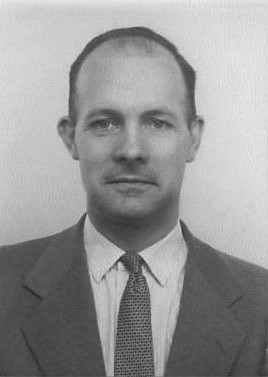
Nominee	Hiram E. McCallum	Ross Dowson
Popular vote	97,715	23,777
Percentage	80.43%	19.57%
Mayor before election
Hiram E. McCallum
Elected mayor
Hiram E. McCallum

== Board of Control ==
Two sitting members of the Board of Control were defeated. Alderman E.C. Roelfson had been appointed to the Board to replace McCallum when he was made mayor. Roelofson received few votes when running, placing seventh. Also defeated was incumbent K.B. McKellar. The two new arrivals were former Alderman Leslie Saunders and former Alderman and Member of Provincial Parliament Allan Lamport.

Results
John Innes (incumbent) - 53,599
Leslie Saunders - 57,746
David Balfour (incumbent) - 55,271
Allan Lamport - 52,037
Stewart Smith - 43,364
Kenneth Bert McKellar (incumbent) - 41,846
Leonard Reilly - 20,756
E.C. Roelofson (incumbent) - 11,905
Harry Bradley- 9,701

== City council ==
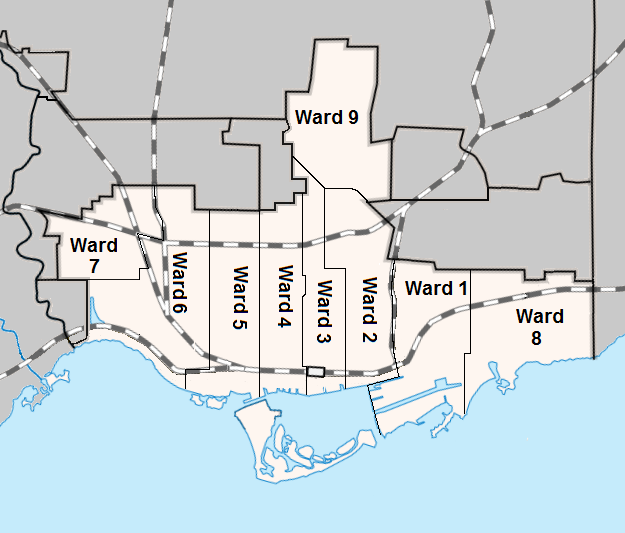
Ward boundaries used in the 1949 election

Ward 1 (Riverdale)
Charles Walton (incumbent) - 8,516
John McMechan - 7,660
Harry Marley - 3,392
Arnold Lorenz - 2,715

Ward 2 (Cabbagetown and Rosedale)
Louis Shannon (incumbent) - 6,308
Everett Weaver (incumbent) - 5,107
May Birchard - 4,177
Sylvester Perry - 1,314

Ward 3 (West Downtown and Summerhill)
Harold Fishleigh (incumbent) - 3,865
Howard Phillips - 2,956
Edith Probert - 1,436
John MacVicar - 1,078
Frank Frier - 724
Francis Burns - 249
Samuel Hawthorne - 218

Ward 4 (The Annex, Kensington Market and Garment District)
Nathan Phillips (incumbent) - 5,967
Norman Freed (incumbent) - 5,927
Francis Chambers - 5,736
William Gallaher - 525

Ward 5 (Trinity-Bellwoods
Charles Sims (incumbent) - 8,429
Arthur Frost (incumbent) - 7,980
Joseph Gould - 7,714
Patrick McKeown - 1,132

Ward 6 (Davenport and Parkdale)
George Granell (incumbent) - 12,434
W.F. Clifton (incumbent) - 11,295
Dewar Ferguson - 5,904
Lester Nelson - 3,712
Gene Dopp - 1,712

Ward 7 (West Toronto Junction)
Charles Rowntree (incumbent) - 5,461
Alfred Cowling - 3,347
William Davidson (incumbent) - 3,129
David Sanderson - 2,739
Earl Selkirk - 2,387

Ward 8 (The Beaches)
Roy Mealing (incumbent) - 10,640
W.H. Collings (incumbent) - 10,594
William Probert - 3,040
Maurice Punshon - 3,646

Ward 9 (North Toronto)
Frank Nash - 9,089
Roy E. Belyea - 7,639
Melville Wilson (incumbent) - 7,377
William Mitchell - 10,542
Harry Cooke - 1,533
Frederick Vacher - 1,438
John Crook - 714
Carl Lewis - 561

Results taken from the January 3, 1949 Toronto Star and might not exactly match final tallies.

== Vacancy ==
Ward 1 Alderman Charles Walton resigned upon appointment to the Toronto Transportation Commission on November 29, 1949 and was not replaced.
