= 1946 Toronto municipal election =

Municipal elections were held in Toronto, Ontario, Canada, on January 1, 1946. Incumbent Robert Hood Saunders ran unopposed and was acclaimed as mayor.

== Toronto mayor ==
Results
Robert Hood Saunders - acclaimed

== Board of Control ==
One incumbent on the Board of Control lost, William J. Wadsworth. He was defeated by Alderman Bert McKellar. Communist Stewart Smith of the Labor-Progressive Party won the second position on the Board.

Results
Hiram E. McCallum (incumbent) - 42,126
Stewart Smith (incumbent) - 41,637
David Balfour (incumbent) - 40,632
Kenneth Bert McKellar - 35,627
William J. Wadsworth (incumbent) - 35,477
Leslie Saunders - 22,040
Harry Bradley - 6,796

== City council ==
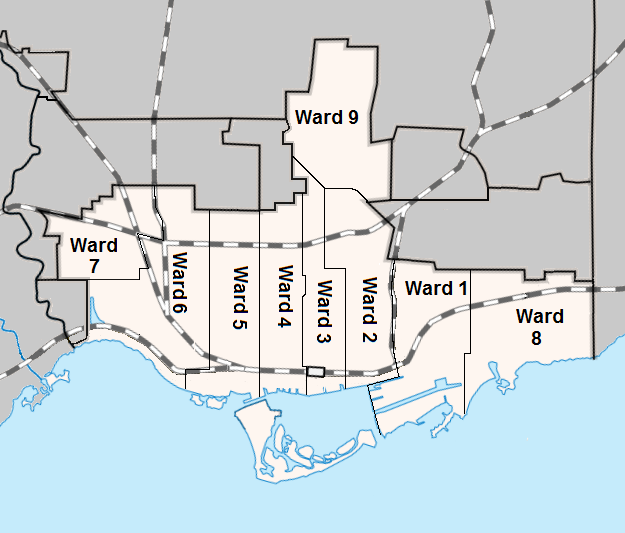
Ward boundaries used in the 1946 election

Ward 1 (Riverdale)
William Murdoch (incumbent) - 5,597
Charles Walton (incumbent) - 4,168
William Simpson - 3,481

Ward 2 (Cabbagetown and Rosedale)
Louis Shannon (incumbent) - 4,118
May Birchard - 3,014
George A. Wilson (incumbent) - 2,910
William Dennison - 2,472

Ward 3 (West Downtown and Summerhill)
John S. Simmons (incumbent) - 2,175
Allan Lamport - 1,911
Harold Fishleigh (incumbent) - 1,724
Earl Selkirk - 586
William Smith - 285
Karl Prager - 281

Ward 4 (The Annex, Kensington Market and Garment District)
Nathan Phillips (incumbent) - acclaimed
Norman Freed (incumbent) - acclaimed

Ward 5 (Trinity-Bellwoods)
Arthur Frost (incumbent) - acclaimed
Charles Sims (incumbent) - acclaimed

Ward 6 (Davenport and Parkdale)
Harold Timmins (incumbent) - 6,768
Dewar Ferguson - 5,510
William V. Muir - 3,960
William Clifton - 3,744
Harold Lock - 2,244
Patrick McKeown - 746
Charles Dymond - 362

Ward 7 (West Toronto Junction)
William Butt - 4,510
E.C. Roelofson (incumbent) - 4,220
Eva Sanderson - 2,157

Ward 8 (The Beaches)
William Collings (incumbent) - 6,789
Walter Howell (incumbent) - 6,476
Murray Cotterill - 5,143
James Davis - 2,244

Ward 9 (North Toronto)
John Innes (incumbent) - 11,092
Melville Wilson (incumbent) - 8,257
F.W. Rayfield - 2,950
R.M. McLean - 1,720
Fred Vacher - 1,623

Results taken from the January 2, 1946 Globe and Mail and might not exactly match final tallies.

=== Changes ===
Ward 3 Alderman John S. Simmons died on March 7, 1946. On March 18, 1946 Harold Fishleigh was appointed to replace him.
