= 1951 Toronto municipal election =

1951 Toronto mayoral election
- December 3, 1951
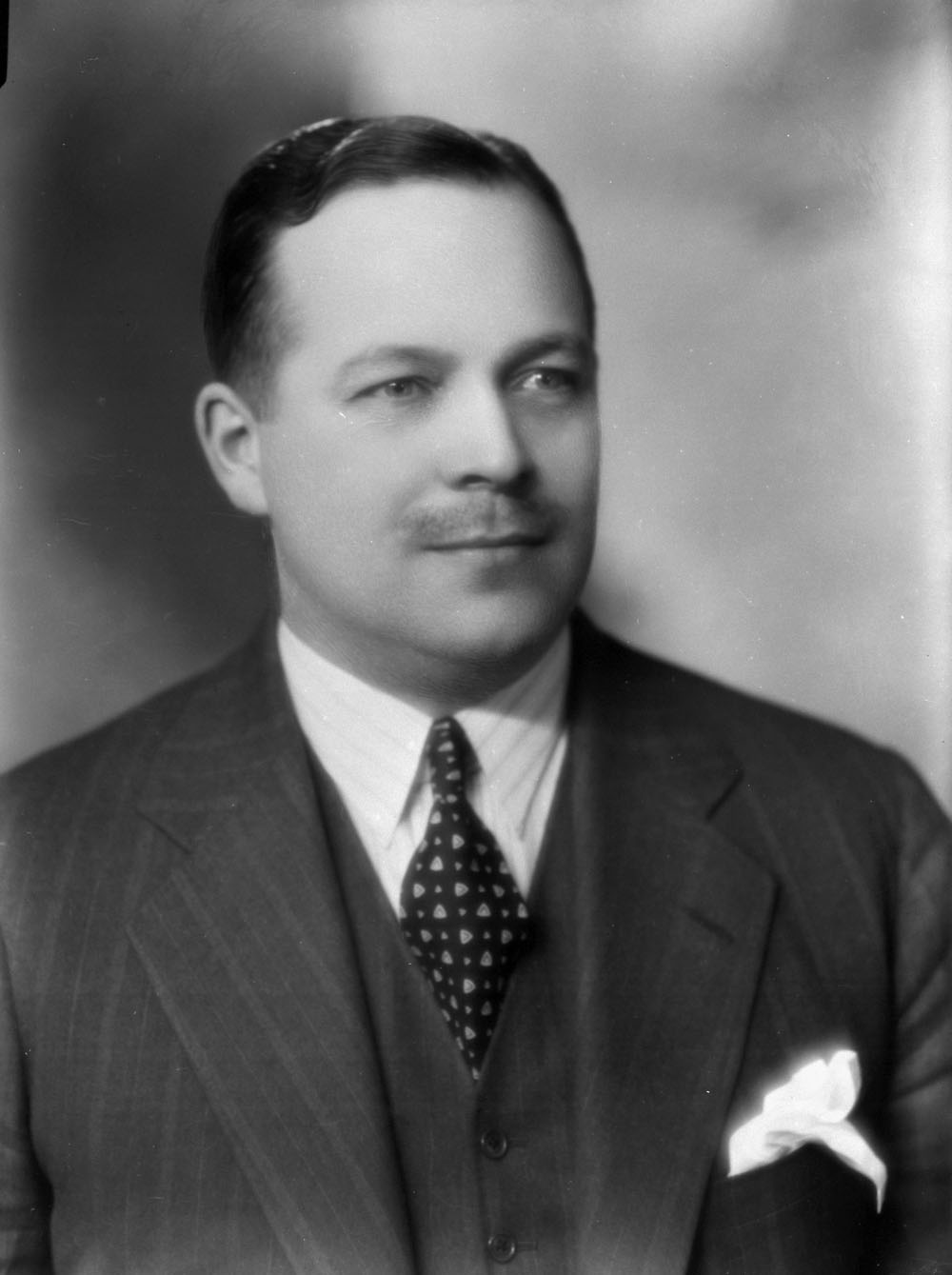

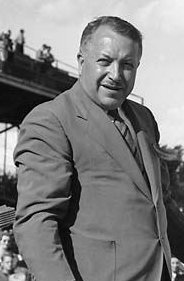

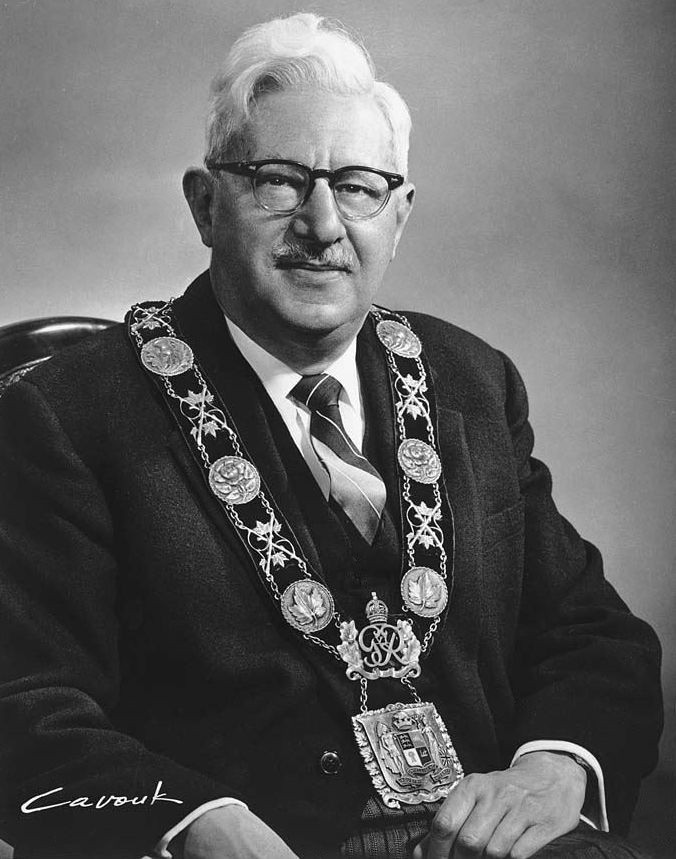
Candidate	Allan Lamport	Hiram E. McCallum	Nathan Phillips
Popular vote	72,648	59,492	24,811
Percentage	46%	37%	15%
Mayor of Toronto before election
Hiram E. McCallum
Elected Mayor of Toronto
Allan Lamport

Municipal elections were held in Toronto, Ontario, Canada, on December 3, 1951. Allan Lamport defeated incumbent Hiram E. McCallum in the mayoral election.

== Toronto mayor ==
Lamport had challenged McCallum the previous year but had lost by a narrow margin. McCallum had originally planned on retiring and being succeeded by Controller John Innes, but Innes died unexpectedly during the year. The 1951 also saw an attempt at the mayoralty by alderman Nathan Phillips, who finished a distant third. In Phillips' autobiography he states that he expected fellow Conservative McCallum to retire, but that their both running split to vote and allowed Lamport to become the first Liberal elected to run the city since 1909. Lamport ran under the slogan "Toronto needs a fighting mayor."

Results
Allan Lamport - 72,648
Hiram E. McCallum - 59,492
Nathan Phillips - 24,811

== Board of Control ==
The only new arrival on the Board of Control was Ford Brand, secretary of the Toronto and District Labour Council. John Innes had died in office and his replacement Alfred Cowling decided to contest the 1951 Provincial Election. Former Controller and avowed Communist Stewart Smith made another attempt to return to the board, but finished a distant fifth.

Results
Leslie Saunders (incumbent) - 95,838
Ford Brand - 92,725
David Balfour (incumbent) - 91,474
Louis Shannon (incumbent) - 87,440
Stewart Smith - 31,317
Frederick Vacher - 20,039

== City council ==
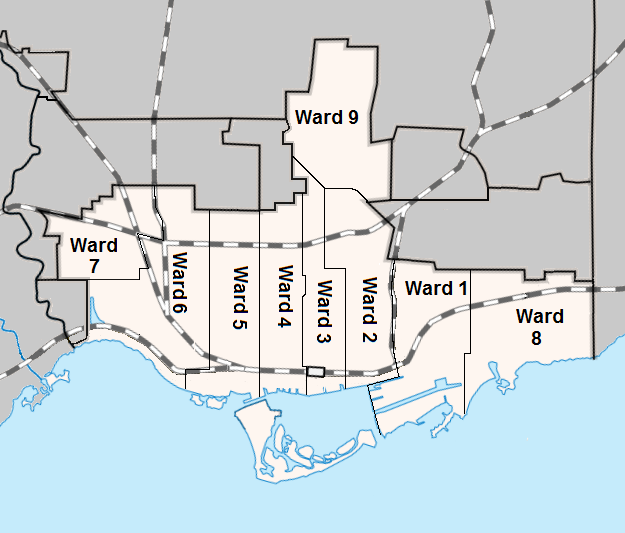
Ward boundaries used in the 1952 election

Ward 1 (Riverdale)
John McMechan (incumbent) - acclaimed
William Allen (incumbent) - acclaimed

Ward 2 (Cabbagetown and Rosedale)
Joseph Cornish (incumbent) - 7,777
Beverley Sparling (incumbent) - 6,659
Perry - 3,809

Ward 3 (West Downtown and Summerhill)
Howard Phillips (incumbent) - 5,248
John McVicar - 4,494
Wilson - 1,257
Feeley - 929
Trottier - 750
Smith - 722

Ward 4 (The Annex, Kensington Market and Garment District)
Francis Chambers (incumbent) - 6,412
Allan Grossman - 4,381
Norman Freed - 4,250
Campbell - 3,290
Garfunkel - 1,573
Darell Draper - 1,377
Reeves - 404

Ward 5 (Trinity-Bellwoods and Little Italy)
Philip Givens 7,240
Ernest Bogart - 7,122
Harold Menzies - 6,600
Charles Sims - 5,612
Segal - 1,526

Ward 6 (Davenport and Parkdale)
May Robinson - 12,086
George Granell (incumbent) - 9,497
Frank Clifton - 8,993
Lester Nelson - 5,690
Ferguson - 3,696
Wilson - 2,141
Patrick McKeown - 1,282

Ward 7 (West Toronto Junction)
William Davidson (incumbent) - 8,546
David Sanderson (incumbent) - 7,602
John Kucherepa- 4,531

Ward 8 (The Beaches)
Ross Lipsett (incumbent) - 13,837
Alex Hodgins (incumbent) - 11,736
McNulty - 4,018
William Probert - 3,399
Banks - 3,290
Hoolans - 2,200
John Square - 758

Ward 9 (North Toronto)
Roy E. Belyea (incumbent) - acclaimed
Leonard Reilly - acclaimed

Results taken from the December 4, 1951 Toronto Star and might not exactly match final tallies.

== Changes ==
Ward 7 Alderman David Sanderson died on March 25, 1952; John Kucherepa was appointed Alderman on March 31.

== Outside Toronto ==
=== North York ===
Nelson A. Boylen re-elected as reeve.

=== Scarborough ===
Oliver E. Crockford re-elected as reeve.
