= 1945 Toronto municipal election =

Municipal elections were held in Toronto, Ontario, Canada, on January 1, 1945. Controller Robert Hood Saunders defeated incumbent Frederick J. Conboy to be elected mayor.

== Toronto mayor ==
Conboy had served as mayor since 1940 and was seeking his fifth term of office, but he was decisively beaten by Saunders.

Results
Robert Hood Saunders - 68,757
Frederick J. Conboy - 36,299

== Board of Control ==
The Board of Control had two vacant seats in the 1945 election. Robert Saunders had left his seat to run for mayor and Fred Hamilton had retired. Five current or past alderman ran for the positions, with Hiram E. McCallum and communist Stewart Smith winning seats.

Results
David Balfour (incumbent) - 47,931
William J. Wadsworth (incumbent) - 45,942
Stewart Smith - 41,691
Hiram E. McCallum - 41,201
Leslie Saunders - 34,587
Ernest Bogart - 34,258
Gordon Millen - 30,235
Harry Bradley - 9,589

== City council ==
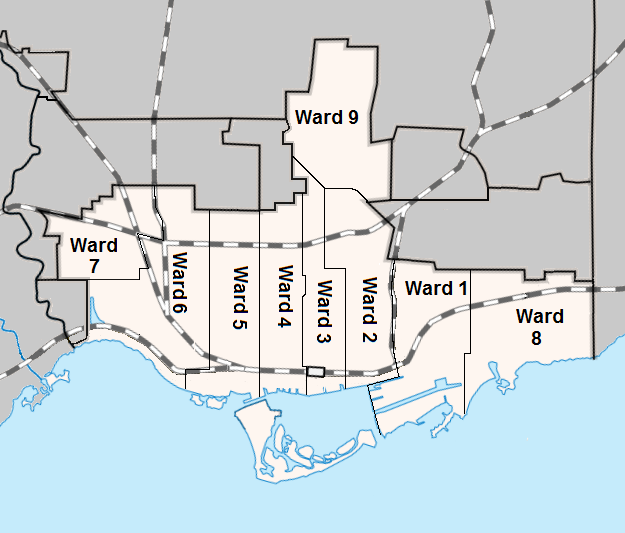
Ward boundaries used in the 1945 election

Ward 1 (Riverdale)
William Murdoch - 5,180
Charles Walton - 4,306
William Simpson - 2,710
John McGuigan - 2,517
W.S.B. Armstrong - 1,582
Irene Humble - 1,357

Ward 2 (Cabbagetown and Rosedale)
Louis Shannon (incumbent) - 5,426
George A. Wilson (incumbent) - 3,925
May Birchard - 3,456

Ward 3 (West Downtown and Summerhill)
John S. Simmons (incumbent) - 3,132
Harold Fishleigh (incumbent) - 2,915
William Smith - 601
Francis Burns - 589
Karl Prager - 402

Ward 4 (The Annex, Kensington Market and Garment District)
Norman Freed (incumbent) - acclaimed
Nathan Phillips (incumbent) - acclaimed

Ward 5 (Trinity-Bellwoods
Charles Sims (incumbent) - 7,788
Arthur Frost - 6,497
Harold Menzies - 4,058
Maxwell Armstrong - 2,338

Ward 6 (Davenport and Parkdale)
Kenneth Bert McKellar (incumbent) - 9,068
Harold Timmins (incumbent) - 8,263
William V. Muir - 4,745
Dewar Ferguson - 4,292
Patrick McKeown - 1,169
Charles Dymond - 661

Ward 7 (West Toronto Junction)
E.C. Roelofson (incumbent) - acclaimed
Charles Rowntree (incumbent) - acclaimed

Ward 8 (The Beaches)
Walter Howell (incumbent) - 7,478
William Collings (incumbent) - 7,104
Murray Cotterill - 5,132
James Davis - 2,687
Charles Wren - 2,505

Ward 9 (North Toronto)
John Innes (incumbent) - 10,684
Melville Wilson - 7,605
Robert Ferguson - 3,329
Christine McCarty - 2,211
R.M. McLean - 1,568
Fred Vacher - 1,009
W.H. Harris - 877

Results taken from the January 2, 1945 Globe and Mail and might not exactly match final tallies.
