= 1937 Toronto municipal election =

Municipal elections were held in Toronto, Ontario, Canada, on December 6, 1937. Ralph Day was elected mayor defeating incumbent William D. Robbins.

== Toronto mayor ==
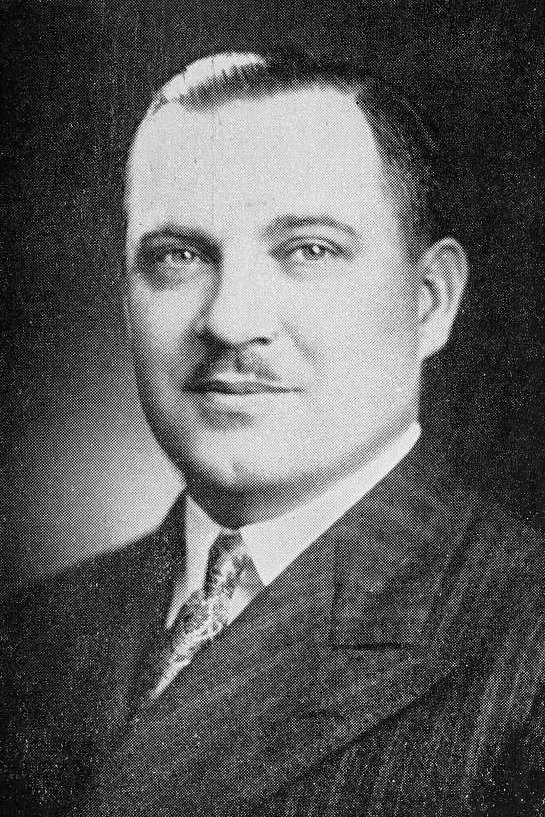
Ralph Day was elected mayor of Toronto

William D. Robbins had been appointed to the office of mayor a year and half previously. He was opposed by the much younger Controller Ralph Day. Day won by a significant margin, beating Robbins in all but two wards. Also running were fringe candidates Carlo Lamberti, a music teacher, and veteran Robert Harding.

Results
Ralph Day - 64,736
William D. Robbins - 50,779
Carlo Lamberti - 2,753
Robert Harding - 2,124

== Board of Control ==
There was one opening on the Board of Control after Day chose to run for mayor. The race turned out to be a close contest between Alderman Douglas McNish and prominent communist Tim Buck with McNish winning by a few hundred votes. Further back was Alderman Robert Hood Saunders.

Results
Frederick J. Conboy (incumbent) - 60,665
William J. Wadsworth (incumbent) - 53,766
Fred Hamilton (incumbent) - 47,493
Douglas McNish - 44,402
Tim Buck - 44,248
Robert Hood Saunders - 41,817
Robert Allen - 15,283
Harry Bradley - 4,623

== City council ==
Ward 1 (Riverdale)
Frank M. Johnston (incumbent) - 6,717
Gordon Millen - 6,520
Robert Siberry - 6,272
Ernest Hewitt - 1,849
I.W. Malcolm - 1,500
John Francis Hughes - 1,035

Ward 2 (Cabbagetown and Rosedale)
Adelaide Plumptre (incumbent) - 3,894
Louis Shannon - 3,715
Joe Thompson - 2,198
George Harris - 1,735
George Kingston - 1,146
Alfred Gagne - 699
J.A.C. Cameron - 684
Bob King - 458
Norman Brown - 252
Frank Ward - 202

Ward 3 (Central Business District)
John S. Simmons (incumbent) - 3,786
Percy Quinn (incumbent) - 3,039
Jean Laing - 1,429
Lloyd Jaeger - 513

Ward 4 (Kensington Market and Garment District)
Nathan Phillips (incumbent) - 5,002
J.B. Salsberg - 4,725
David A. Balfour - 3,172
Hyman Langer - 1,967
Joseph Stewart - 1,211

Ward 5 (Trinity-Bellwoods
Stewart Smith (incumbent) - 8,025
Ernest Bogart (incumbent) - 7,572
C.M. Carrie - 6,736
Jacob Romer - 1,493
Frederick Cottrell - 615

Ward 6 (Davenport and Parkdale)
D.C. MacGregor (incumbent) - 8,596
George Grannell (incumbent) - 6,339
William V. Muir - 6,253
Neil Cameron - 5,271
Pat McKeown - 1,649
Alan Dignan - 1,514
William Haysey - 1,417
Chester Sherlock - 1,184
William Logie - 717
Bertram Tipping - 656

Ward 7 (West Toronto Junction)
George H. Gardiner (incumbent) - 4,885
Charles Rowntree - 8,901
Frank Whetter (incumbent) - 3,432
Minerva Reid - 3,318

Ward 8 (The Beaches)
Walter Howell (incumbent) - 8,316
Ernest Bray (incumbent) - 7,388
Edmund Guest - 6,627
Ernest Woollon - 4,266
Gifford Baker - 1,168

Ward 9 (North Toronto)
William Croft (incumbent) - 7,699
William D. Ellis (incumbent) - 7,453
John Innes - 7,183

Results taken from the December 7, 1937 Toronto Star and might not exactly match final tallies.
