= 1956 Toronto municipal election =

Election

1956 Toronto mayoral election
- December 3, 1956
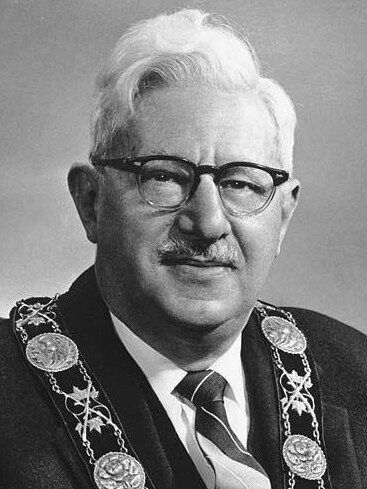

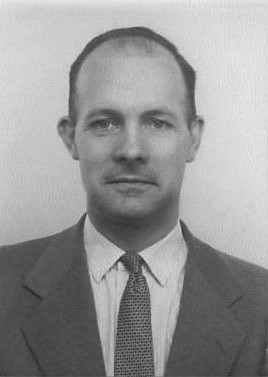
Candidate	Nathan Phillips	Ross Dowson
Popular vote	80,352	9,834
Percentage	89.1%	10.9%
Mayor of Toronto before election
Nathan Phillips
Elected Mayor of Toronto
Nathan Phillips

Municipal elections were held in Toronto, Ontario, Canada, on December 3, 1956. Incumbent mayor Nathan Phillips was easily reelected. Jean Newman became the first woman elected to the Board of Control, and topped the poll to become budget chief.

== Toronto mayor ==
Nathan Phillips, elected two years earlier, faced only limited opposition from Trotskyist Ross Dowson and was easily reelected.

Results
Nathan Phillips - 80,352
Ross Dowson - 9,834

== Board of Control ==
All four sitting Board of Control members chose to run for re-election. Controller and former mayor Leslie Saunders was pushed off the board by Jean Newman's victory. Newman is the first woman to be elected to the Board of Control or to win a city-wide election in Toronto. The most senior two Controllers in terms of votes also sat on Metro Toronto Council.

Results
Jean Newman - 54,785
Ford Brand (incumbent) - 54,178
William Allen (incumbent) - 54,038
Joseph Cornish (incumbent) - 49,385
Leslie Saunders (incumbent) - 47,048
Harry Bradley - 16,450
Charles Sims - 6961
George Rolland - 5,632

== City council ==
Two aldermen were elected per Ward. The alderman with the most votes was declared Senior Alderman and sat on both Toronto City Council and Metro Council.

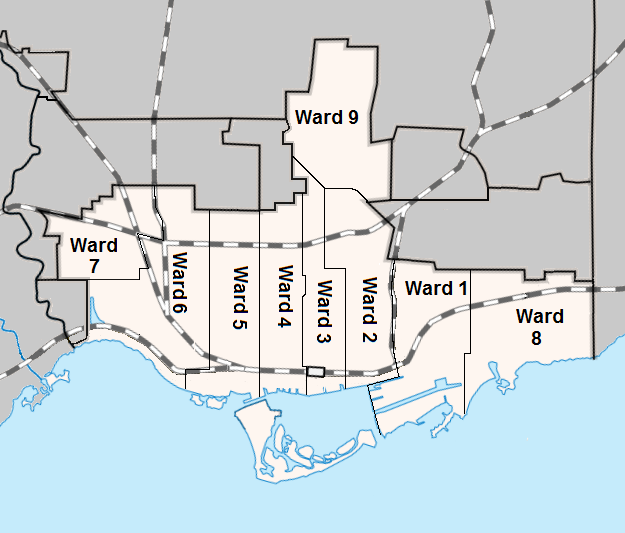
Ward boundaries used in the 1956 election

Ward 1 (Riverdale)
Ken Waters (incumbent) - 6,318
Fred Beavis - 3,636
Jean Brown - 3,412
George Phillips (incumbent) - 2,578
Dominic Di Stasi - 1,657
Basil Ingleby - 494

Ward 2 (Regent Park and Rosedale)
William Dennison (incumbent) - 4,962
May Birchard - 2,614
Sterling Campbell - 2,567
Edgar Roxborough (incumbent) - 2,380
Andrew Kavanaugh - 569
Philip Rowley - 528

Ward 3 (West Downtown and Summerhill)
Ross Parry (incumbent) - 4,149
John MacVicar - 1,980
Richard James - 2,537

Ward 4 (The Annex, Kensington Market and Garment District)
Herbert Orliffe (incumbent) - 4,437
Francis Chambers (incumbent) - 3,449
David Rotenberg - 2,692
Dorothy Cureatz - 628

Ward 5 (Trinity-Bellwoods and Little Italy)
Philip Givens (incumbent) - 6,226
Harold Menzies (incumbent) - 5,177
Ben Nobleman - 1,500
Paul Pauk - 1,092

Ward 6 (Davenport and Parkdale)
May Robinson (incumbent) - 8,691
Frank Clifton (incumbent) - 7,171
William Stevens - 3,884
Wallace Martin - 2,066
John Shedden - 1,795
George Jackson - 1,498

Ward 7 (Bloor West Village)
William Davidson (incumbent) - 5,122
John Kucherepa (incumbent) - 5,069
Thomas Wilson - 1,548
Stewart - 1,077
William Repka - 579

Ward 8 (The Beaches)
Donald Summerville (incumbent) - 12,567
Albert G. Cranham (incumbent) - 9,577
Chris Stavro - 2,488
John Square - 1,146

Ward 9 (North Toronto)
Frank Nash (incumbent) - 12,084
Kenneth Ostrander - 10,515
Alex Thompson - 8,064

Results are taken from the December 4, 1956 Toronto Star and might not exactly match final tallies.

== Changes ==
Ward 7 Alderman John Kucherepa resigned January 6, 1958 having been elected in the 1957 Federal Election; Thomas Wilson was appointed replacement on January 20.

== Suburbs ==
=== East York ===
Reeve
Jack Raymond Allen - 5,757
C. Howard Chandler - 4,510

Jack R. Allen defeated business executive C. Howard Chandler. Source:

=== Etobicoke ===
Reeve
H.O. Waffle - 9,519
Jack Bennett - 5,014

Deputy Reeve Waffle defeated Bennett, a former Toronto alderman to replace retiring reeve Bev Lewis.

Deputy Reeve
Murray Johnston - 8,005
Charles Devlin - 6,429

=== Forest Hill ===
Reeve
Laurie T. Simonsky (acclaimed)

=== Leaside ===
Mayor
(incumbent)Charles Hiscott (acclaimed)

=== Long Branch ===
Reeve
(incumbent)Marie Curtis - 1,522
William Cambera - 553
Sherman Anderson - 175

Deputy Reeve
Maurice Breen - 1,309
Stanley Purvis - 888

=== Mimico ===
Mayor
(incumbent)William Arthur (Gus) Edwards - 1,802
Owen Gertrude - 1,098

=== New Toronto ===
Mayor
(incumbent)Donald Russell - 1,783
David Post - 810

=== North York ===
Reeve
Vernon Singer - 24,045
Maurice T. Hook - 5,302

Councillor Singer defeated former deputy reeve Hook to replace retiring reeve, Fred McMahon. Source:

=== Scarborough ===
Reeve
Albert Campbell - 13,470
(incumbent)Gus Harris - 11,569

Deputy Reeve
George R. Mason - 13,270
John Algar - 11,361

=== Swansea ===
Reeve
(incumbent)Dorothy Hague (acclaimed)

Deputy Reeve
H.B. Squarebriggs - 1,233
K.C. Woodsworth - 740

=== Weston ===
Mayor

- (incumbent)Harry Clark (acclaimed)

=== York ===
Reeve
Chris Tonks - 8,742
Walter Saunders - 7,736
Charles McMaster - 1,993
