= 1962 Toronto municipal election =

1962 Toronto mayoral election
- December 3, 1962
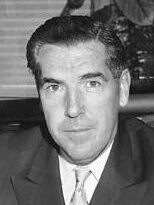

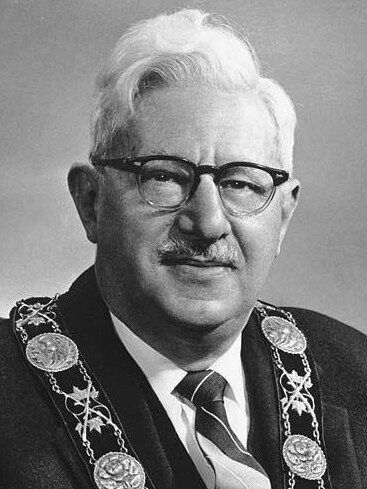
Candidate	Donald Summerville	Nathan Phillips
Popular vote	117,031	51,933
Percentage	66%	29%
Mayor of Toronto before election
Nathan Phillips
Elected Mayor of Toronto
Donald Summerville

Municipal elections were held in Toronto, Ontario, Canada, on December 3, 1962. Incumbent mayor Nathan Phillips, then the longest-serving mayor in Toronto history, lost to Controller Donald Summerville by a significant margin.

Two major referendums were also held in Metro Toronto. The most controversial was over water fluoridation, which passed by a slim margin of 166,960 to 163,240. The areas outside Toronto also voted to remove some of the last of the Blue Laws by allowing movies to be shown on Sundays, something that was already allowed in the city itself.

== Toronto mayor ==
Phillips had first been elected to city council in 1926 and was elected mayor in 1954. He had won an unprecedented four elections to become the longest-serving mayor in Toronto history. Summerville was much younger and had first been elected to council in 1955, representing the eastern Beaches area. One of the central issues of the campaign was a desire for change and a more youthful mayor. Summerville won by large margin more than doubling Phillips' total. Summerville won every ward in the city, including Phillips' former area. Less than a year into his term Summerville died of a heart attack while playing hockey and was replaced by Controller Philip Givens.

Results
Donald Summerville - 117,031
Nathan Phillips (incumbent) - 51,933
Frank Nasso - 4,966
Ross Dowson - 1,119
Harry Bradley - 815
Charles Henry Mahoney - 406

== Board of Control ==
Summerville's decision to run for mayor opened one position on the Board of Control, the four-person executive committee elected at large across the city. This opening was won by former mayor Allan Lamport, who bested council members Margaret Campbell and Ken Waters. The two Controllers with the most votes also sit on Metropolitan Toronto Council.

Philip Givens (incumbent) - 88,629
Allan Lamport - 84,902
William Dennison (incumbent) - 76,504
Herbert Orliffe (incumbent) - 73,118
Margaret Campbell - 72,108
Ken Waters - 62,019
Phyllis Clarke - 16,151
Frederick Graham - 10,475
Dorothy Cureatz - 6,752

== City council ==
Two aldermen were elected per Ward. The alderman with the most votes was declared Senior Alderman and sat on both Toronto City Council and Metro Council.

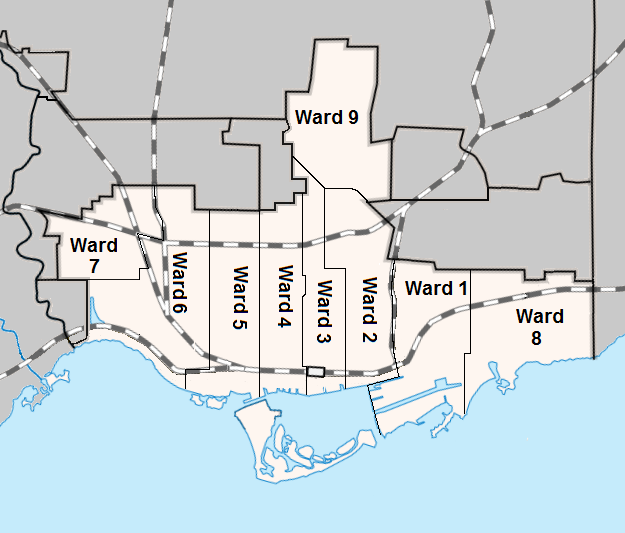
Ward boundaries used in the 1962 election

Ward 1 (Riverdale)
Fred Beavis (incumbent) - 11,714
Oscar Sigsworth - 7,853
Thomas Clifford - 6,073
Peter Ward - 2,024

Ward 2 (Regent Park and Rosedale)
Michael Grayson (incumbent) - 4,809
May Birchard - 4,465
Stanley Price - 3,546
June Marks - 2,946
Thomas McAulay - 2,277
Ernest Stanton - 1,941
John MacVicar - 1,824
Arthur J. Brown - 1,745
Glen Dawson - 593
Axel Olson - 215

Ward 3 (West Downtown and Summerhill)
William Archer (incumbent) - 9,076
Charles Tidy (incumbent) - 7,844
James Sanderson - 1,748

Ward 4 (The Annex, Kensington Market and Garment District)
David Rotenberg (incumbent) - 6,448
Horace Brown (incumbent) - 5,764
Francis Chambers - 5,525
Jack Frankel - 2,364
Sam Sherman - 1,788

Ward 5 (Trinity-Bellwoods and Little Italy)
George Ben - 7,045
Joseph Piccininni (incumbent) - 6,623
Harold Menzies (incumbent) - 6,237
Lloyd White - 2,524
John Jones - 1,289
Michael Kaschuk - 1,123
Stanley Linkovich - 1,051

Ward 6 (Davenport and Parkdale)
May Robinson (incumbent) - 11,652
Frank Clifton (incumbent) - 8,790
Hugh Bruce - 7,346
George Jackson - 2,677
Pauline Miles - 2,460
Harry Branscombe - 2,298
William Varley - 1,310

Ward 7 (Bloor West Village)
Mary Temple (incumbent) - 7,467
William Davidson (incumbent) - 5,850
Thomas Wilson - 3,433
Ben Grys - 3,105
James Stephens - 2,187

Ward 8 (The Beaches)
Tom Wardle Sr. (incumbent) - 17,161
Alex Hodgins (incumbent) - 16,449
Chris Stavro - 7,750
John Square - 1,939

Ward 9 (North Toronto)
Richard Horkins - 13,741
Kenneth Ostrander (incumbent) - 12,234
Paul Pickett - 9,324
Frank Nash (incumbent) - 7,420
John Lawer - 6,945

Results are taken from the December 4, 1962 Toronto Star and might not exactly match final tallies.

== Changes ==
Mayor Donald Summerville died on November 19, 1963. Controller Philip Givens became Acting Mayor and on November 25 was unanimously chosen Mayor. On November 28 Controller William Dennison was appointed a Metro Councillor; Ward 3 Alderman William Archer was chosen controller and Ward 3's remaining Alderman Charles Tidy was chosen Metro Councillor. On December 9 Helen Johnston was appointed Ward 3 Alderman.

== Suburbs ==
=== East York ===
Reeve
(incumbent)True Davidson 11,609
C. Howard Chandler 4,997

=== Etobicoke ===
Reeve
John Palmer MacBeth (acclaimed)

Board of Control (2 elected)
Murray Johnson 20,384
John Carroll 17,218
Andrew Macdonald 14,362

This was the first Board of Control elected in Etobicoke.

Town Council
Leonard Braithwaite became the first Black person to be elected to Etobicoke Town Council, as a councillor for Ward 4.

=== Forest Hill ===
Reeve
Edwin Pivnick (acclaimed)

=== Leaside ===
Mayor
Beth Nealson -3,551(recount)
Lloyd Dickinson - 3,546 (recount)

Acting Mayor Lloyd M. Dickinson was initially declared the winner by 14 votes but Nealson won after a recount conducted on December 27, 1962.

=== Long Branch ===
Reeve
Leonard E. Ford 1,332
Thomas Berry 657
Cyril Lerbeton 223

=== Mimico ===
Mayor
(incumbent)Hugh Griggs 2,832
Gus Edwards 1,137

=== New Toronto ===
Mayor
(incumbent)Donald Russell 2,619
Clifford Johnson 730

=== North York ===
Reeve
(incumbent)Norman C. Goodhead 30,181
James Ditson Service 21,321

Source: The major campaign issue was the proposal to amalgamate Metropolitan Toronto's 13 municipalities into 6 boroughs. Goodhead opposed amalgamation while Service favoured it.

=== Scarborough ===
Reeve
(incumbent)Albert Campbell 29,084
Busby 13,286

=== Swansea ===
Reeve
Lucien Coe Kurata 1,086
Edward Berkeley Higgins 1,018
Charles Douglas Cameron 889

=== Weston ===
Mayor
(incumbent):George W. Bull 1,878
Wood 909

=== York ===
Reeve
Jack Mould - 7,031
Chris Tonks - 6,987
Albert Stollard - 5,360
Charles McMaster - 2,739
Pauline Shapero - 1,558

Mould defeated former reeve Christopher Tonks. He was declared the victor by 44 votes after a recount.
