= William Clifton =

William or Bill Clifton may refer to:

- William de Clifton (fl. 1302–1305), MP for Lancashire
- Sir William Clifton, 3rd Baronet (1653–1686)
- William Clifton (Australian politician), Members of the Western Australian Legislative Council, 1832–1870
- William Clifton (architect), architect of the IOOF Temple Building
- William Clifton (footballer) (1891–1953), English footballer, played for Leyland, Preston North End and Rochdale
- William Clifton (Canadian politician), in Toronto municipal election, 1946 and 1947
- Bill Clifton (pianist) (1916–1967), Canadian Jazz pianist
- Bill Clifton (1931–2026), American musician

== See also ==
- William Cliffton (1771–1799), American poet and pamphleteer in Philadelphia
- Clifton (surname)
