= Company of Young Canadians =

Canadian youth program (1966–1977)

The Company of Young Canadians (CYC) was a short-lived Canadian youth program sponsored by the federal government, which existed from 1966 to 1977. It was designed to be run autonomously without government direction.

It generated considerable controversy shortly after its founding: coordination with volunteers in small communities was poorly organized, and several of the youth involved in the program were prominent political activists. Among other things, it was accused in 1969 of harbouring terrorists by municipal officials from Montreal, including Mayor Jean Drapeau. These claims were never verified. In March 1970, its administration was taken over by the federal government, and in 1977, it was formally abolished.

The CYC was a co-sponsor of the National Film Board of Canada's Indian Film Crew in 1968, the NFB's first foray into Native-made filmmaking.

Notable alumni of the CYC include Gilles Duceppe, Georges Erasmus, Barbara Hall, Phil Fontaine, David DePoe, Michael Valpy, and Ian Hamilton (Canadian writer).
