= David DePoe =

Canadian community activist and teacher

- Born: 1944 (age 81–82); Toronto
- Occupations: Activist, Teacher
- Parent(s): Norman DePoe, Madeline DePoe

David DePoe (born 1944) is a community activist and retired teacher. He is best known for his activities in the late 1960s as an unofficial leader of the Yorkville hippies, founder of the Diggers movement in Yorkville and for staging protests and a sit-in at the Toronto city council chambers in 1967 in an ultimately unsuccessful bid to make Yorkville a pedestrian-only street.

David DePoe was born in Toronto in 1944 and is the son of well-known CBC journalist Norman DePoe and Madeline DePoe. He joined the Pearson government initiative, the Company of Young Canadians (CYC) project, in 1966. In 1967, under guidance from the CYC, he founded the Diggers in the Yorkville neighbourhood of Toronto. At this time Yorkville was the hippie capital of Canada and local politicians, the police force and residents were concerned over the developing youth subculture. The initiative was inspired by the Diggers theatre group that was active in the Haight-Ashbury area of San Francisco. The Digger group in Yorkville was concerned with community action and provided support to youth in need of food and shelter.

DePoe's activities came to national attention in 1967 prompting the Star Weekly to publish a picture of him on the cover of an issue in September 1967 with the headline "SUPER HIPPIE," a title he himself disdained. He was known as the unofficial spokesperson for Yorkville through a number of disputes with Toronto city council over traffic in Yorkville, most famously with former mayor and councillor Allan A. Lamport. DePoe led a series of sit-ins throughout the city during the period of August 17 to August 24, 1967, to try to persuade the city to close Yorkville Avenue to vehicle traffic and create a pedestrian mall as Yorkville was the site of numerous coffee houses, cafes, and shops. Traffic had become a problem as people came to the cruise the strip and gawk at the hippies. The city had grown frustrated with the traffic and a perceived problem with drugs and vagrancy. On August 17 David DePoe and the Diggers were invited to a "Talk-in" with Allan Lamport. The talks did not go well and on August 20 a sit-in was held in the middle of Yorkville Avenue. After a number of arrests the large group moved to Queen's Park and finally, on August 23 a "sleep-in" took place in front of Toronto's City Hall. Ultimately these efforts were not successful. The protests were documented by the National Film Board of Canada in the films Flowers on a One-Way Street (1967), directed by Robin Spry and Mort Ransen's Christopher's Movie Matinee (1968). In the latter film a group of high school aged students making a film about Toronto youth become indirectly involved in the Yorkville protests. Their production is shut down when their participation in a 'Film-in' is (erroneously) suspected to have contributed to the volatility of the situation. A follow up film, The Summer of '67 (1994), revisited key personalities in the two prior films nearly thirty years after the events.
