= Murray Dowson =

Canadian politician

Murray Dowson (1915 – before 2002) was a Canadian Trotskyist politician.

Dowson was born in Toronto, Ontario. In the mid-1930s, Murray joined the Workers' Party of Canada while a student at York Memorial Collegiate. He later joined B. J. Field's League for a Revolutionary Workers Party before rejoining the Trotskyists. He took his brother, Ross Dowson, to some Trotskyist meetings, after which Ross also decided to join. Several other members of the Dowson family were also recruited to Trotskyism.

The group was banned at the start of World War II, and many of its established leaders left politics. With his brother, Murray maintained an underground newspaper, and this gave them the impetus to found the Revolutionary Workers Party (RWP). Murray became editor of its newspaper, Labour Challenge, then briefly co-editor of a Quebec edition of the French Trotskyist paper, La Verité.

In 1953, there was a major split in the Fourth International, to which the RWP was affiliated. In response to this, Murray theorised that World War III was imminent, and that given the weakness of the RWP, it was necessary to immediately enter the Cooperative Commonwealth Federation (CCF). Joining with his brother-in-law, Joe Rosenthal and some supporters, he split from the RWP. The following year, he attended the Fourth Congress of the Fourth International, but walked out. His tendency in the CCF soon disappeared, but he remained an active trade unionist. He eventually politically reconciled with his brother and was a regular speaker at forums held by the Socialist League in the 1970s.
