= Ross Dowson =

Canadian politician (1917–2002)

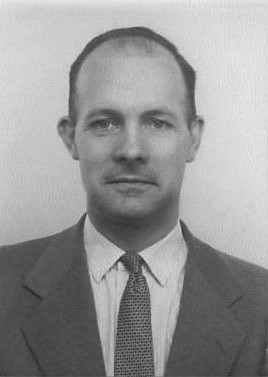
- Dowson, c. 1958
- Born: Ross Jewitt Dowson; September 4, 1917; Weston, Ontario, Canada
- Died: February 17, 2002 (aged 84); Toronto, Ontario, Canada
- Political party: Revolutionary Workers Party, League for Socialist Action, Socialist League; Co-operative Commonwealth Federation, New Democratic Party
- Movement: Trotskyism

Ross Jewitt Dowson (September 4, 1917 – February 17, 2002) was a Canadian Trotskyist political figure and perennial candidate.

== Early life ==
Dowson was born on September 4, 1917, the third of seven children in a working-class family in Weston, Ontario, then a suburb of Toronto. His father was a printer, an atheist, and an anarchist and his mother was a stenographer.

In the midst of the Great Depression, Dowson's older brother, Murray, joined the Workers' Party of Canada, a Trotskyist organisation, while a student at York Memorial Collegiate Institute and brought Ross along to meetings. The pair set up the York Memorial High School Spartacus Club. The younger Dowson joined the party and declared to his mother at the age of 17 that he intended to spend his life as a professional revolutionary. Harry Kopyto, a long-time friend and follower of Dowson, told the Globe and Mail that Dowson "got his politics from the hungry thirties, seeing working-class people share what they had while the upper class kept what they had to themselves... "He believed in the social ownership and democratic control of the wealth of society."

As an entryist, Dowson joined the Co-operative Commonwealth Youth Movement (CCYM), the youth wing of the Co-operative Commonwealth Federation, in 1938 and but was expelled due to his political activities.

The Canadian Trotskyist movement collapsed at the beginning of World War II. Leaders such as Jack MacDonald and Maurice Spector had already left due to factional disputes and disagreements and the leader at the time the war broke out, Earle Birney, dropped out to focus on being a poet and because he disagreed with the Trotskyist position on the war. The movement suffered a further blow when the Socialist Workers League (as the Workers party was now called) was declared illegal under the Defence of Canada Regulations.

Ross and Murray Dowson remained with the group as it went underground. Dowson joined the Canadian Army in 1942 and rose to the rank of second lieutenant. He recruited two other soldiers to the Trotskyist movement and organized a successful strike for better pay by soldiers who had been assigned to lay and tamp train tracks in southern Ontario. Dowson was discharged from the army in December 1944.

Dowson was elected secretary of the Socialist Workers League in October 1944, and reorganized the movement, founding the Revolutionary Workers Party (RWP) with Dowson as national secretary and editor of its newspaper Labour Challenge.

Dowson ran for mayor of Toronto nine times in the 1940s, 1950s and 1960s. He campaigned openly as a Trotskyist under the slogan “Vote Dowson, Vote for a Labor Mayor, Vote for the Trotskyist Candidate” and garnered 11% of the vote in the 1948 mayoral election and over 20% of the vote in 1949.

== Cold War ==
The RWP declined however due to the pressures of the Cold War and ended its activities. Its members joined the Co-operative Commonwealth Federation (CCF) as an entrist faction known internally as "The Club" but continued to operate the Toronto Labor Bookstore on Yonge Street, run by Dowson, where they would also hold meetings and organize their activities. In order to save money, Dowson lived in the bookstore and lived a spartan lifestyle.

A split in the Fourth International in 1953 had ramifications in the RWP and in Dowson's own family. Ross Dowson and the majority of the group sided with the faction led by James P. Cannon and the Socialist Workers Party (United States), this faction formed the International Committee of the Fourth International. His brother Murray and brother-in-law Joe Rosenthal formed a pro-Michel Pablo minority, and split from the RWP in 1954 to form a Trotskyist tendency within the CCF. It disappeared by the end of the decade.

== Federal politics ==
Ross Dowson ran for the House of Commons of Canada on two occasions. He was a candidate in a 1957 by-election in the rural riding of Hastings—Frontenac, in which the CCF decided not to run a candidate. After Dowson said that he would be willing to join the CCF caucus should he be elected, CCF leader Major James Coldwell rejected the offer saying, "In the unlikely event of Mr. Dowson winning the by-election he would certainly find no welcome from the CCF and no opportunity of aligning himself with us." Running under the "Labour" label, Dowson received only 266 votes in a two-way race against External Affairs minister Sidney Earle Smith.

In the 1958 general election, Dowson was again a candidate in the Toronto riding of Broadview. He placed fourth with 477 votes. This time he ran as a "Socialist" candidate, despite the fact that the democratic socialist CCF also stood a candidate.

Dowson also filed his nomination papers as a "Labour" candidate against new Progressive Conservative leader Robert Stanfield in the 1967 Colchester—Hants by-election but withdrew when Elwood Smith entered the race as an independent candidate with informal NDP backing.

=== Election results ===
Canadian federal by-election, November 4, 1957: Hastings—Frontenac Appointment of George Stanley White to the Senate
Party	Candidate	Votes
Progressive Conservative	Sidney Earle Smith	10,513
Labour	Ross Dowson	266
Library of Parliament

1958 Canadian federal election: Broadview
Party	Candidate	Votes
Progressive Conservative	George Hees	15,364
Liberal	George A. Taylor	4,738
Co-operative Commonwealth	John Alan Lee	3,356
Socialist	Ross Dowson	447

== 1960s ==
By 1961, Dowson and his Trotskyist group had returned to an entrism policy towards social democracy and joined the New Democratic Party (NDP) at its founding. In that year, the Trotskyist movement relaunched itself as the "League for Socialist Action" (LSA), with branches in Toronto and Vancouver and Dowson as national secretary.

Dowson was also editor of the LSA's newspaper, which was first called Vanguard and later Labour Challenge. The LSA grew during the student radicalization of the late 1960s, bringing youth into the movement. He helped shape the national movement in Canada against the Vietnam War, devising the slogan "End Canada's Complicity in the War in Vietnam".

In 1963, Dowson played a role in the reunification of the Fourth International when he was sent to Europe with Joseph Hansen to help negotiate a settlement between the American and Canadian groups on one side and the International Secretariat of the Fourth International led by Ernest Mandel following the ouster of Pablo earlier in the decade.

In 1964, the LSA developed a Quebec counterpart, the Ligue Socialiste Ouvriere (Workers' Socialist League).

In the late 1960s, Canadian Marxist academics, under the influence of the then-predominant dependency theory, tended to view Canada as an economic colony of the United States. Dowson was influenced by this analysis, which also influenced the Waffle movement in the NDP. Dowson moved towards a position that held that Canadian nationalism was progressive against American imperialism, a view that put him in the minority in the LSA.

== Split from the LSA ==
Dowson's faction was defeated at the LSA's 1973 convention and, in early 1974, he and about 20 supporters left the LSA and the United Secretariat of the Fourth International to form the Socialist League. This group came to be known as the "Forward Group" after the name of its newspaper. The group grew initially, but soon declined. By 1989, it had been reduced to a small group of friends around Dowson; then he suffered a devastating stroke that left him unable to speak or write for the rest of his life.

== Dowson v RCMP ==
Dowson and his organization became a target for the Royal Canadian Mounted Police, which labelled Dowson a "subversive" and monitored and attempted to interfere with his activities. As part of a 1972 action code named "Operation Checkmate", the RCMP engaged in an attempt to disrupt and break-up the LSA and destroy the credibility of Dowson and another LSA leader, John Riddell. The LSA split the following year.

An investigation by the Ontario Provincial Police determined that RCMP officers engaged in what the Toronto Star called a "secret war" against Dowson and the LSA since 1960 and that these actions involved what the OPP described as "at least the apparent commission of crime ... by the RCMP security service."

Dowson and his followers subsequently spent 13 years attempting to prosecute the RCMP. In 1980, Attorney-General of Ontario Roy McMurtry intervened to quash attempts by Dowson and Riddell to lay charges against the RCMP on the basis that such a prosecution was not in the public interest and had no chance of success. The Supreme Court of Canada overturned McMurtry's decision in 1983, allowing Dowson to commence a private prosecution, but in 1985 the charges were dismissed by lower courts.

However, Dowson testified and provided evidence before two royal commissions investigating RCMP wrongdoings, including the Royal Commission of Inquiry into Certain Activities of the RCMP, that were instrumental in the eventual replacement of the RCMP's security service with a new agency, the Canadian Security Intelligence Service.

== Personal life ==
Professionally, Dowson was a machinist as a youth and later a lithographer and printer by training, but spent almost his entire working life as a full-time paid staffer (at times the only one) for the organization, for many years living in the organization's bookstore. For the new generation of recruits in the 1960s and early 1970s, he was the major link to the older generation of class-struggle militants and Marxists who had built the labour and socialist movements in previous decades. He suffered a stroke in 1989 which left him paralyzed and almost unable to communicate for the rest of his life.

Dowson was a closeted gay man at a time when homosexuality was illegal and not accepted socially. He concealed his sexual orientation through a celibate lifestyle.

Dowson's brothers Hugh, Murray and his sisters Joyce (Dowson) Rosenthal and Lois (Dowson) Bédard were also active in the Trotskyist movement.

Dowson's niece Anne Lagacé Dowson is a broadcaster and politician who was the New Democratic Party's candidate in Westmount—Ville-Marie in the 2008 federal election.
