= May Birchard =

Canadian politician

May Birchard (died July 30, 1968) was a municipal politician and poverty activist in Toronto, Ontario, Canada. Born in Toronto, she married F.J. Birchard, an agricultural scientist who was an expert on grain. During the First World War the family moved to Winnipeg, Manitoba. A self described left-wing Liberal, May Birchard was a strong believer in the Canadian Social Gospel movement that originated in Winnipeg during the first part of the 20th century. In 1933, during the Great Depression, Birchard founded The Good Neighbours' Club to aid unemployed men. A few years later a branch was opened in Toronto. The organization continues to operate with a drop-in centre on Jarvis Street.

After the death of her husband in 1940, Birchard moved back to Toronto and became active in local politics. She first served as a school board trustee in 1942. At the height of the war, she pushed for daycare for the children of women helping with the war effort for free meals for impoverished children. She was first elected to Toronto City Council in 1946 but was defeated in 1947. She was defeated several more times before again being elected in the 1956 election. She was reelected in 1958 but defeated in 1960. She returned again in 1962 but was defeated in her final election in 1964. She represented Ward 2 which was a mixed area west of the Don River. The northern part of the riding was Rosedale, the wealthiest part of the city. The southern part was Cabbagetown, the poorest part of the city. Birchard's had much support in Cabbagetown, but she was vulnerable to candidates who could win the backing of Rosedale. Thus Birchard's career was marked by alternating victories and defeats on council campaigns.

On the council she pushed for women's rights, most notably on improving access to birth control. She was also an advocate for the poor and for more social housing, including strong support for the Regent Park project that was built in her ward in the era. In honour of her efforts a Toronto Community Housing Corporation building at Dundas and Broadview was named the May Birchard Apartments.
