= Joseph Gould (Toronto politician) =

Canadian politician

Joseph M. Gould

Ontario MPP
- In office 1959–1965
- Preceded by: Arthur Frost
- Succeeded by: George Ben
- Constituency: Bracondale

Personal details
- Born: August 22, 1909 New York City, NY
- Died: May 8, 1965 (aged 53) Toronto, Ontario
- Party: Liberal
- Domestic partner: Esther Freeman
- Profession: Lawyer

Joseph M. Gould, QC (August 22, 1909 – May 8, 1965) was a Canadian politician in Ontario. He was a Liberal member of the Legislative Assembly of Ontario from 1959 to 1965 who represented the downtown Toronto riding of Bracondale. He was a municipal alderman for Ward 5 in the 1950s. He died in office at age 55.

== Background ==
One of five children, he was born in New York City to Russian-Jewish immigrants. His father, Zusha Goled was a tailor and cantor. He or his parents changed his name to Jacob Gold after he entered the United States at Ellis Island. His mother, Henyagitel (Annie) walked across Europe from Russia to take a boat to join her husband in New York. Along with his parents and older brother Max, the family moved from the Lower East side to the cleaner air of Toronto. Gould was captain of the Osgoode Hall debating team at the University of Toronto. He practised criminal law and entered politics at a time when restrictive practices posed numerous challenges and he changed his name from Gold to the more Anglo-Saxon Gould.

Gould was married to Esther Freeman. They had three children Stephen, Marshall and Corrine. Stephen is a graduate of Berklee College of Music, an associate professor, and director of the Educational Leadership PhD program at Lesley University in Cambridge, Massachusetts. Marshall is a writer in Toronto. Corrinne is the owner of Esther Gould's Finest, a Toronto business based on her mother's mandelbread recipe.

== Politics ==
Gould was a revered member of the community, a tireless fighter for the "little man" and appointed as a Queen's Counsel (QC). He ran for the Liberal party in the provincial St. Patrick electoral district in the June 4, 1945 Ontario general election, placing second to Progressive Conservative Kelso Roberts. In 1950, he was elected as an Alderman, representing Ward 5 in the old City of Toronto. He represented Ward 5 until 1955. In the 1959 Ontario general election, he ran for the Liberal Party again, this time in the Bracondale electoral district, which was near Ward 5. He defeated the incumbent MPP, Progressive Conservative Arthur Frost, and would remain the MPP for this district until his death in 1965. Gould was a candidate in the 1964 Ontario Liberal leadership convention. His candidacy was supported by Paul Hellyer who represented part of Gould's riding in the House of Commons of Canada.

== Death ==
When Gould died, he did so coincidentally a few hours after Frost, the man he replaced to become Bracondale's MPP. Both men died on May 8, 1965. George Ben, the Liberal Party candidate who ran to succeed him, won Gould's seat in a by-election, and became that riding's last MPP, as Bracondale was abolished and redistributed into two adjacent electoral districts for the 1967 Ontario general election. When he died, Gould was married to Esther Gould. They had three children, who were in their mid-teens to early twenties at the time of his death.
