= Robert Hood Saunders =

Canadian mayor

Robert Hood Saunders CBE QC
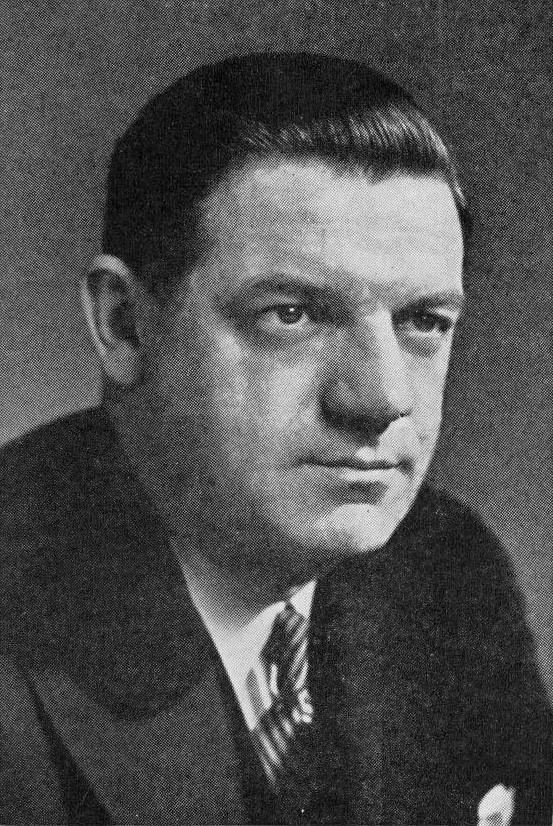
- Saunders in 1945

48th Mayor of Toronto
- In office 1945–1948
- Preceded by: Frederick Conboy
- Succeeded by: Hiram E. McCallum

Chairman of Ontario Hydro
- In office 1948–1955

Toronto Ward 4 Alderman
- In office 1935-1936, 1940

Toronto Board of Control
- In office 1937-1939, 1941-1947

Personal details
- Born: May 30, 1903 Toronto, Ontario, Canada
- Died: January 16, 1955 (aged 51) London, Ontario, Canada

Robert Hood Saunders CBE QC (May 30, 1903 – January 16, 1955) was mayor of Toronto from 1945 to 1948, and then president of the Canadian National Exhibition, and chairman of the Ontario Hydro (formally named the Hydro Electric Power Commission of Ontario (HEPCO)). He was also a member of the Orange Order in Canada.

== Biography ==
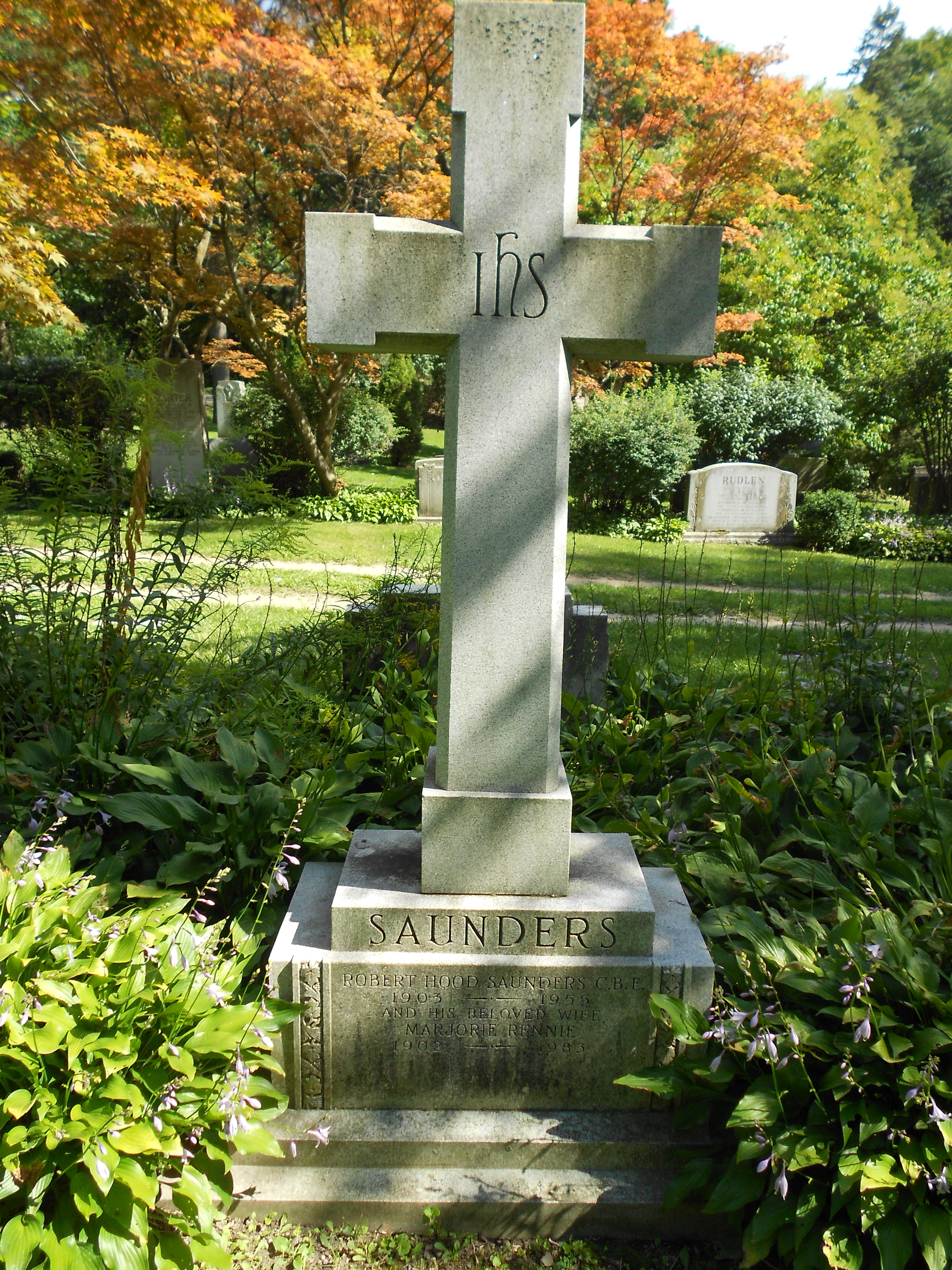
Gravestone in Mt. Pleasant Cemetery

As mayor, he was nicknamed "Grassroots Bob," for his down-to-earth style. A native of Toronto, he was a champion of the Toronto subway and fought to remove slums. In 1946, Saunders was inspired by an elementary school traffic safety program in Detroit. Saunders worked to start a program in Toronto, and the result was the Elmer the Safety Elephant program.

Saunders was elected alderman for Ward 4 in 1935 and again in 1936. He was defeated in several attempts to be elected to the Toronto Board of Control before returning to city council as an alderman for Ward 4 in 1940. Saunders was elected to and served on the Board of Control from 1941 until 1944 before winning the January 1, 1945 mayoral election by defeating incumbent mayor Frederick J. Conboy. Saunders was re-elected in 1946, 1947 and 1948.

After his resignation as mayor, he became chairman of the Ontario Hydro commission in February 1948. One of his mandates was developing Ontario's waterpower resources, especially on the St. Lawrence Seaway. On January 14, 1955, he boarded an airplane on a business trip. The plane left Windsor, Ontario and on approach to London, Ontario, the plane crashed. The 51-year-old Saunders died as a result of the injuries he sustained. He is buried in Mount Pleasant Cemetery, Toronto (section Q-207).

On his death, Fred Gardiner, chairman of Metropolitan Toronto Council, had this to say:

Newsboy, athlete, successful lawyer, mayor to the city, chairman of Hydro, president of the Exhibition, and the one man most responsible for the St. Lawrence Seaway, Bob Saunder's life was a series of successes which only a man of his dynamic energy and ability could accomplish.

A tribute to Saunders was unveiled by the then Premier Leslie M. Frost of Ontario on September 5, 1958. A St. Lawrence Power Project, the R.H. Saunders – St. Lawrence Station, was named after him. On this occasion, Premier Frost said,

... he was a person of kindness and understanding; a very human being in many capacities and in many ways. His accomplishments were legion ... It is a fitting tribute to his memory that the St. Lawrence Power Project be named after him.

== Robert H Saunders Memorial ==
In Toronto the Robert H. Saunders Memorial, a bas relief on stone marker was completed in 1957 by Emanuel Hahn on University Avenue south of College Street.

== See also ==
- List of Toronto municipal elections
