= Charles A. Walton (Toronto politician) =

Charles Walton
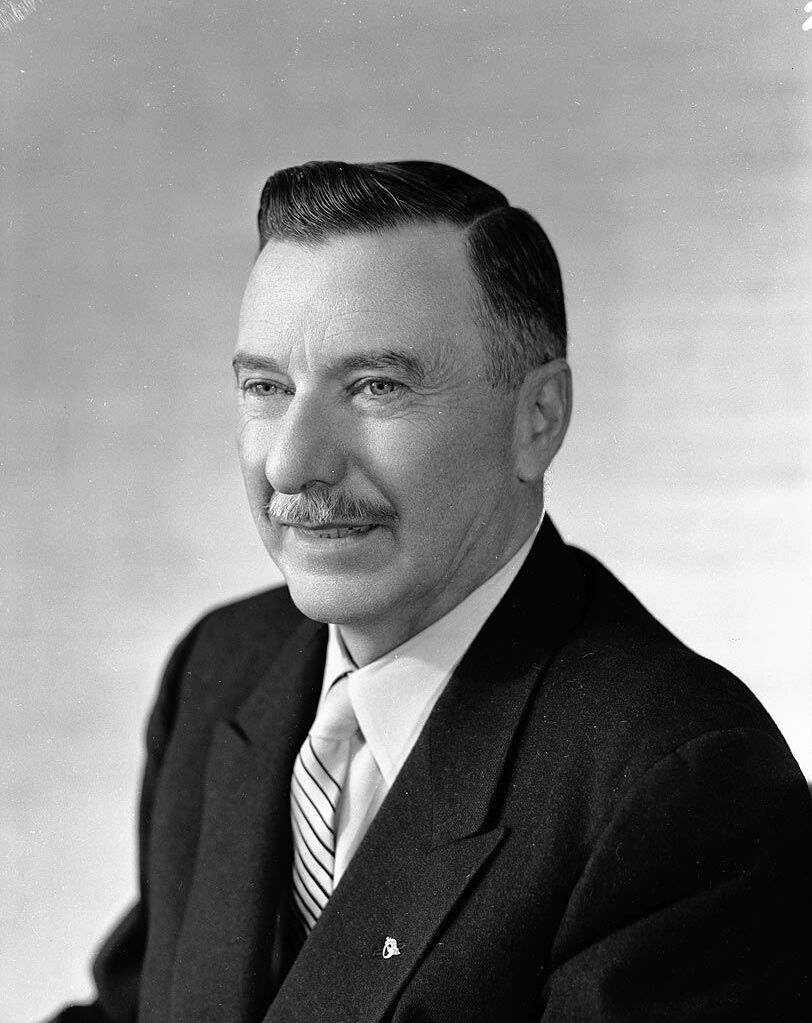
- Walton, c. 1959

Personal details
- Born: Toronto, Ontario, Canada

Charles A. Walton was born in Toronto and attended Park and Earl Grey Public Schools, Riverdale Collegiate and Shaw's Business School. He pursued a career in real estate and was involved with Billy Summerville in the construction and operation of the Eastwood and Prince of Wales Theatres in Toronto. Walton became active in civic affairs when he was elected to the Toronto City Council in 1945 as alderman for ward 1. He served until 1949, during which time he served as chair of several committees. He was appointed to the Toronto Transit Commission (TTC) in 1949, and served continuously until 1968. Walton was appointed Chairman effective January 3, 1959 following the sudden resignation of Allan A. Lamport. He served as Chairman until 1960, when he was replaced by Clarence Downey. At that time, he became Vice-Chairman of the TTC and President of Gray Coach Lines, posts he held until his term on the Commission expired in early 1968, when he was not re-appointed by Metro Council in an effort to bring fresh faces to the Commission.

Walton was also active in other community affairs as one of the original Directors of the Danforth-East York YMCA, Governor of the Viaduct Senior Hardball League and a Director of the Woodgreen Community Centre. He served as a Director of the Canadian National Exhibition, Governor of the Toronto East General Hospital and on the Board of Stewards of the Danforth United Church. He was a member of the Albany Club, the Toronto Real Estate Board, and served on the Metropolitan Toronto Industrial Commission.

Charles Walton and his wife had a family of four daughters.

Preceded by Allan Lamport	Chairman of the Toronto Transit Commission; 1959-1960	Succeeded by C.C. Downey
