= Francis Chambers =

British architect (1828–1900)

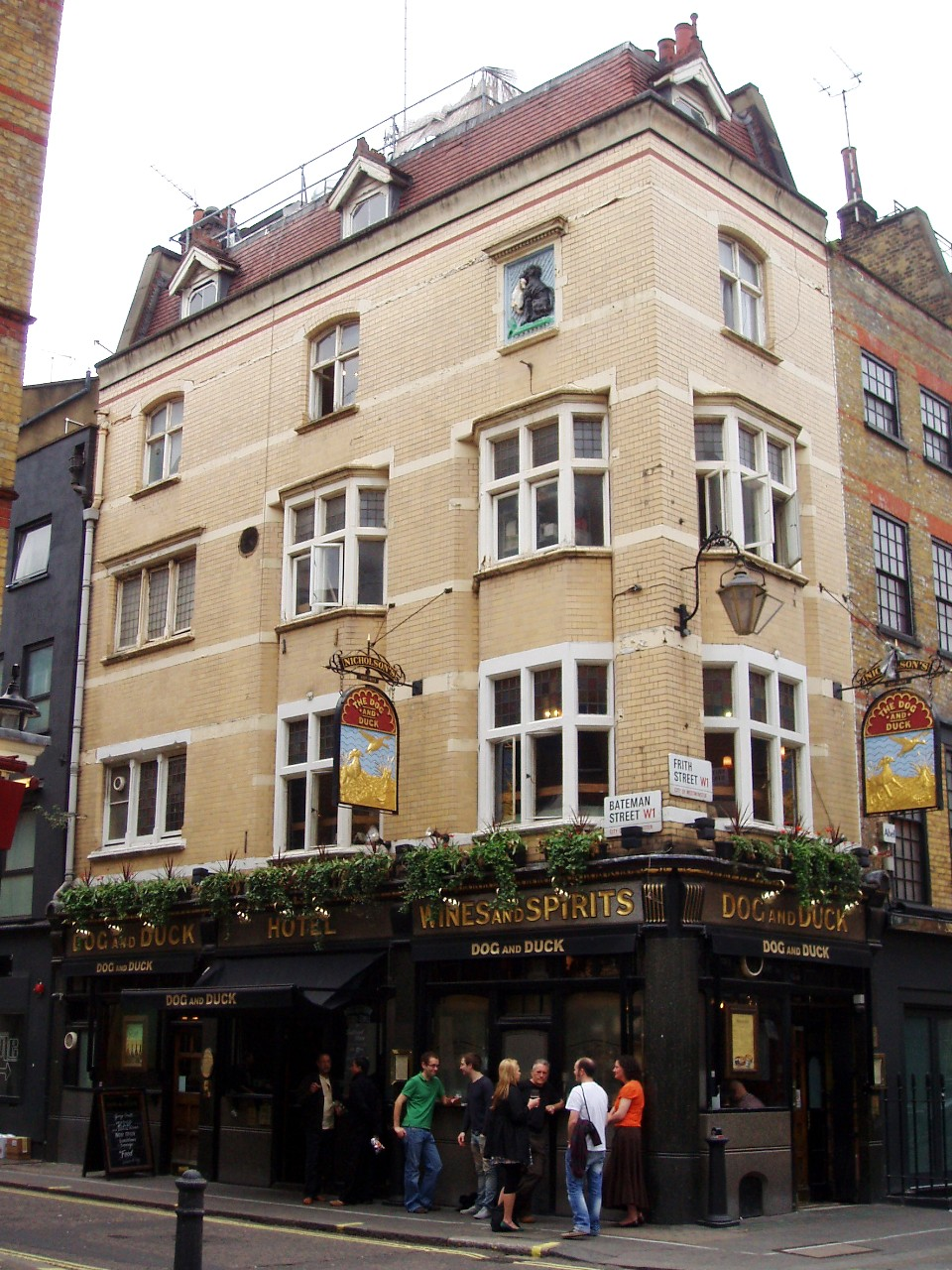
The Dog and Duck

Francis Chambers FRIBA (26 December 1828 – 1 December 1900) was a British architect, active in London.

Chambers was born in Islington, the son of Francis Chambers, a gentleman, and his wife, Margaret Warlters. He was educated at King's College School, and was then articled to Sydney Smirke alongside Arthur Cates and Thomas Chatfield Clarke.

Other buildings Chambers designed included the Central London District School at Hanwell; of St. Anne's Church, Norwood; of Christ Church, Norwood; and of several buildings in Guernsey, including the Market at Saint Peter Port and the Ladies' College. He also designed many mansions, schools and private houses around England, but was best known as a designer of warehouses, stores and other business premises in London.

Chambers is perhaps best known as the architect of the Dog and Duck, a Grade II listed public house at 18 Bateman Street, Soho, London, built in 1897 for Cannon Brewery. The pub is reportedly where George Orwell had a celebratory drink after Animal Farm was picked as the American Book of the Month Club.

Chambers died 1 December 1900 in Broadstairs, Kent, aged 71. The cause of death was reported as "cardiac affection" lasting several months.

His only son, Frank Job Chambers, was also an architect, who was trained by his father, then became his partner and had a long career.
