= Leslie Saunders =

Canadian politician (1899–1994)

Leslie Howard Saunders
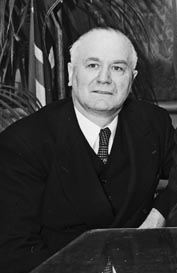
- Leslie Saunders in 1956

51st Mayor of Toronto
- In office 1954–1955
- Preceded by: Allan Lamport
- Succeeded by: Nathan Phillips

3rd Mayor of East York
- In office 1976–1976
- Preceded by: Willis Blair
- Succeeded by: Alan Redway

Personal details
- Born: September 12, 1899 London, England
- Died: March 30, 1994 (aged 94) Scarborough, Ontario, Canada
- Party: Progressive Conservative
- Occupation: Business manager

Leslie Howard Saunders (September 12, 1899 – March 30, 1994) was Mayor of Toronto, Canada, from 1954 to 1955 and the last member of the Orange Order to hold the position until William Dennison. He also served as Mayor of East York in 1976.

== Early life ==
Saunders was born in London, England and immigrated with his family to North Bay, Ontario at the age of six. He began his working career in Northern Ontario with the Ontario Northland Railway. A trade unionist, he became president of his local union and ran as a Labour candidate for North Bay's city council. He served in World War I and then became Secretary-General of the Great War Veteran's Association in North Bay helping raise money for a war memorial.

== Political career ==
A staunch Salvationist, Saunders joined the Orange Order in 1918. He had a 37-year-long political career which began in North Bay where he served as an alderman for six years. He and his family moved to Toronto in 1928 and, during the Great Depression, Saunders became Business Manager of The Sentinel, the Orange Order's influential, twice-weekly publication. In 1936, Saunders founded a rival publication, Protestant Action, as he felt The Sentinel was not taking a strong enough stand against Catholic-run Separate Schools. Saunders entered politics and was elected as a school board trustee and then as an alderman in the 1942 election.

The council that Saunders joined was dominated by the Orange Order. 16 out of 23 members were Orangemen. Saunders was considerably more radical in his Orangeism than his fellows. He at times refused to stand for "O Canada", arguing the monarchist "God Save the King" and the "Maple Leaf Forever" were Canada's true anthems. In 1946 he led a campaign against the city holding a public welcoming for newly proclaimed Cardinal James Charles McGuigan. Saunders argued that Catholics had no right to parade through the streets of what was a "Protestant City". He also led a letter writing campaign against the Encyclopedia Americana, for what he argued was a biased article on the Orange Order. The campaign was a success and the volume was recalled and replaced with an article written by Saunders.

Saunders was chairman of the city committee which established Regent Park as Canada's first public housing project.

In 1945, Saunders attempted to win the Progressive Conservative nomination for Riverdale, but he lost narrowly to his fellow Ward 1 alderman Gordon Millen. Saunders then tried to win election to the Board of Control. He received no major newspaper endorsements, and in the 1945 and 1946 elections failed to win a seat. In 1947 he won back his old seat on city council he served there for two years before trying again for the Board of Control. In the 1949 election he was endorsed by all three daily papers and won a seat on the Board.

== Mayor ==
Saunders topped the Board of Control vote in the 1953 election. When mayor Allan Lamport resigned to become head of the Toronto Transit Commission, Saunders was appointed mayor. Saunders caused almost immediate controversy when one of his first acts was to write a Twelfth of July letter on official stationery extolling William of Orange's victory in the Battle of the Boyne. Controller Roy E. Belyea, a fellow Orangeman, criticized Saunders for his action accusing him of being intolerant of religious minorities.

The Mayor's letter was reprinted in the press prompting him to be vilified in editorials. The controversy, along with Saunders's decision to bar the press from attending meetings of the Board of Control, was a contributing factor in his subsequent electoral defeat at the hands of Nathan Phillips, the first non-Protestant, the first non-Orangeman in the twentieth century and first Jew to be mayor of Toronto. During the election, Saunders had proclaimed himself to be running as "Leslie Saunders, Protestant". In pointed contrast to Saunders, Phillips was hailed as "Mayor of all the people".

Forty members of the Orange Order had become Mayor in Toronto's history, including all of Toronto's mayors in the twentieth century up to and including Saunders. After his defeat, Saunders became Grand Master of the Orange in Canada and Imperial Grand President but was unable to stem the decline of the Order, particularly amongst youth, in what was becoming an increasingly multicultural, non-sectarian city.

== East York ==
Saunders became politically active in the Toronto suburb of East York. He ran for reeve in 1960, and was defeated by True Davidson. He was elected to the East York council in 1961, where he became a fixture. In 1976, he argued against holding a Flag Day to commemorate the tenth anniversary of the Maple Leaf Flag replacing the Canadian Red Ensign as Canada's flag.

He served as the borough's chief magistrate in 1976 when he became interim mayor, appointed to complete the term of Willis Blair upon his appointment to the Ontario Municipal Board. He was re-elected to council as an alderman for a final term before retiring in 1978.

== Orange Order ==
Saunders was a devoted Orangeman and served as Imperial Grand President of the Grand Orange Council of the World, the Order's highest office, for six years.
