= David A. Balfour =

David Arthur Balfour

Controller of the Toronto Board of Control
- In office 1944-1954

Ward 4 Alderman
- In office 1939-1943
- Preceded by: J. B. Salsberg
- Succeeded by: J. B. Salsberg

Personal details
- Born: 1889 Amherstburg, Ontario
- Died: 1956 (aged 66–67)
- Education: De La Salle College
- Occupation: business person

David Arthur Balfour (1889–1956) was a municipal politician in Toronto, Ontario, Canada. He was active in civic politics from 1939 until 1955. This included twelve years on the Board of Control, a longer service than anyone prior.

Balfour was born in Amherstburg, Ontario. His father was MPP and later Speaker of the Legislative Assembly of Ontario William Balfour. Balfour joined his father in Toronto at age seven and was educated at De La Salle College. He went into business owning a stationery supply store and became active on the Separate School Board, serving there fifteen years.

He was first elected to city council in 1939. Throughout his political career Balfour was strongly identified as representing the city's Roman Catholic population. There were then few Catholic elected officials in Toronto as municipal politics was dominated by those affiliated with the Protestant Orange Order. One of Balfour's main issues was anti-communism. Balfour represented Ward 4 which stretched from University Avenue to Bathurst Street. It was home to Kensington Market and the area along Spadina Avenue home to the many factories of the garment industry. This area was home to many poor workers, and was also the centre of Toronto's large Jewish community. It was also the centre of the Canadian communist movement. During the 1940s several candidates affiliated with the communist Labor-Progressive Party were elected to Toronto City Council. After losing his seat in the 1943 election to communist J.B. Salsberg Balfour introduced a motion demanding Salsberg and fellow communist Stewart Smith be barred from taking their seats. The motion was ruled out of order by mayor Frederick J. Conboy.

Another campaign that brought Balfour much attention was his attacks on what he termed "salacious literature and suggestive art." He demanded the federal government act to ban books he considered obscene, and would name such books in city council to warn citizens about them. Among his targets was The Grapes of Wrath, Double Indemnity, Forever Amber, and The Decameron. These campaigns brought Balfour much attention, both positive and negative, but had little effect. Fellow controller Hiram E. McCallum argued that Balfour naming salacious books had the effect of greatly increasing their sales.

On municipal issues Balfour had an important lasting impact on the city of Toronto. He was the primary advocate of the creation of a public square in the centre of the city, which became Nathan Phillips Square. He was also the main advocate for creating a system of one-way streets downtown and for the introduction of parking meters.

He retired from politics due to ill health in 1955. He died the next year three weeks after suffering a heart attack. He had six children. One of his sons, Ronald, was killed in action in 1943.

== Legacy ==
David A. Balfour Park is a city park renamed in the 1960s (originally Reservoir Park) and home to Toronto Water underground reservoir.
