= Harold Fishleigh =

Canadian politician

Ontario MPP
- In office 1951–1959
- Preceded by: Bert Leavens
- Succeeded by: Ken Bryden
- Constituency: Woodbine

Personal details
- Born: May 11, 1903 Wingham, Ontario
- Died: September 23, 1998 (aged 95) Toronto, Ontario
- Political party: Progressive Conservative
- Occupation: Pharmacist, notary public, business realtor

Harold Ferguson Fishleigh (May 11, 1903 – September 23, 1998) was a Canadian politician who was a Member of Provincial Parliament in the Legislative Assembly of Ontario from 1951 to 1959. He represented the riding of Woodbine as a Progressive Conservative member. Born in Wingham, Ontario, he worked as a pharmacist and realtor. He died in 1998.
