= Arthur George Frost =

Arthur Frost

MPP for Bracondale
- In office November 22, 1951 – June 10, 1959
- Preceded by: Harry Lindley Walters
- Succeeded by: Joseph Gould

Personal details
- Born: May 16, 1888 Toronto, Ontario, Canada
- Died: May 7, 1965 (aged 76) Toronto, Ontario
- Party: Ontario Progressive Conservative Party
- Spouse: Gertrude Hough
- Occupation: florist

Arthur George Philip Frost (May 16, 1888 – May 7, 1965) was a Canadian politician who was a Member of Provincial Parliament in Legislative Assembly of Ontario from 1951 to 1959. He represented the riding of Bracondale for the Ontario Progressive Conservative Party. Frost was born in Toronto and was a florist. He also served as an alderman on the Toronto City Council.
