= Louis Shannon =

Canadian politician

J. Louis Shannon (died February 16, 1954) was a municipal politician in Toronto, Ontario, Canada who served for multiple years on Toronto City Council and the Toronto Board of Control.

Shannon was raised in Vankleek Hill where his father was the editor of small newspaper. Shannon's father died when he was seven and the family relocated to Toronto where he studied at Oakwood Collegiate Institute. He then went to McMaster University where he studied law. He settled in the Moore Park neighbourhood of the city.

He was elected to Toronto City Council in 1937 representing Ward 2. This ward covered both Shannon's own neighbourhood, and the areas along the Don River, including Cabbagetown that were some of the poorest. Shannon was an active member of the United Church of Canada, and was a strong advocate of Toronto's Blue Laws, such as the ban on playing sports on Sunday. He was also committed to social welfare, and pushed at city council for a number of measures to alleviate poverty. These included child care for working mothers and health clinics in the poorer neighbourhoods. He was also one of the foremost proponents of the Regent Park urban renewal scheme that saw much of Cabbagetown replaced by subsidized housing.

He was an active Liberal, and served as campaign manager for fellow Liberal Allan Lamport. In 1940 he unsuccessfully ran for Parliament in the riding of Rosedale, but lost to Harry Jackman in the traditionally Tory riding.

In February 1954 Shannon suffered a heart attack and died ten days later at age 56.
