= John Innes (Toronto, Ontario politician) =

Canadian politician

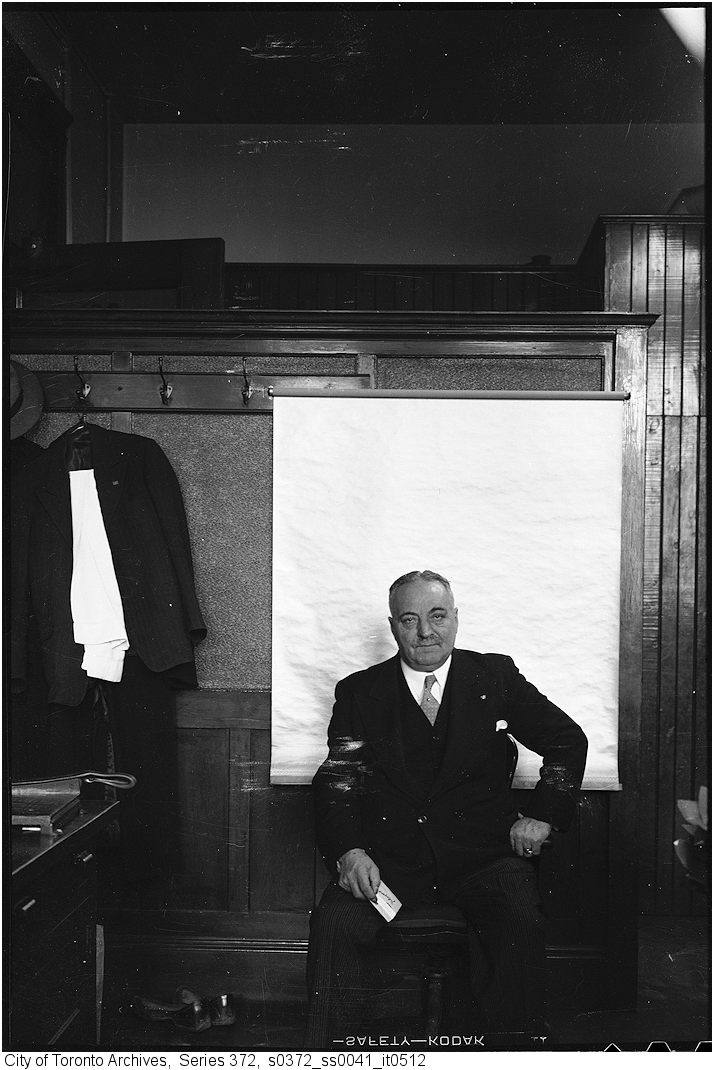
John Innes in 1948

John Innes (died July 1951) was a municipal politician in Toronto, Ontario, Canada. He was born in Scotland and immigrated to Canada in around 1900 when he was in his twenties. A carpenter by trade he built a home on Merton Street in North Toronto. He then became a developer, building several other homes around the area. He married Jesse Coutts, but she died in 1928 after being hit by a golf ball.

He served eight years on Toronto city council before being elected to the Board of Control in 1947. He became well known for his work officially greeting soldiers as they returned to the city during both the Second World War and the Korean War. He was in charge of notifying family members when a troop train would be arriving, and personally greeted almost every train to come into the city. This work earned him an MBE. Another cause was improving the safety of service stations and their employees. As a result of this after his death it was proposed that all service stations shut down for five minutes in honour of him.

Innes topped the polls in the Board of Control election of 1949, and thus won the powerful Controller position. It was widely expected that he would run for mayor in 1951, succeeding Hiram E. McCallum. However, Innes died unexpectedly in July of that year of a heart attack. One of the best known politicians in Toronto, his sudden death was a considerable surprise. John Innes Community Centre in Moss Park was named after him.
