= Allan Lamport =

Canadian politician (1903–1999)

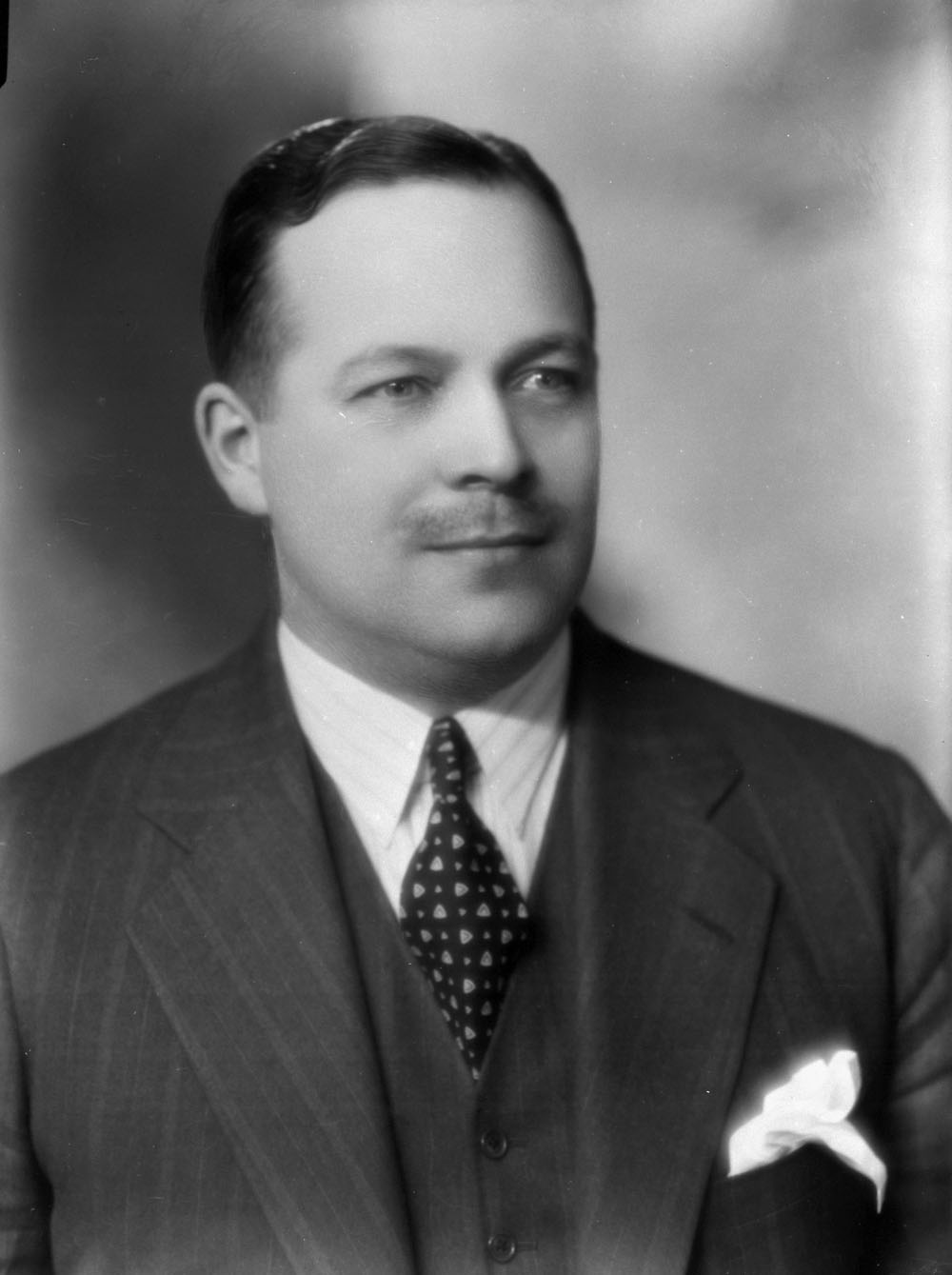
- Lamport, c. 1938

50th Mayor of Toronto
- In office 1951–1954
- Preceded by: Hiram McCallum
- Succeeded by: Leslie Saunders

Toronto Ward 3 Alderman
- In office 1946-1948

Toronto Board of Control
- In office 1949-1950, 1935-1937
- Succeeded by: William Dennison

MPP for St. David
- In office 1937–1943
- Preceded by: Wilfrid Heighington

Personal details
- Born: Allan Austin Lamport; April 3, 1903 Toronto, Ontario, Canada
- Died: November 18, 1999 (aged 96) Toronto, Ontario, Canada
- Party: Liberal

Allan Austin Lamport, CM (April 4, 1903 – November 18, 1999) was mayor of Toronto, Ontario, Canada, from 1951 to 1954. Known as "Lampy", his most notable achievement was his opposition to Toronto's Blue laws which banned virtually any activities on Sundays. Lamport fought to allow professional sporting activities on Sundays. He won the 1954 election, but resigned after six months to become vice-chairman (later chairman) of the newly formed Toronto Transit Commission (TTC). Lamport later returned to City Council and made headlines for his opposition to Yorkville's hippies in the late 1960s.

== Political life ==
He first sat on Toronto City Council in 1937. A licensed pilot, he urged the city to build airports on Toronto Island and in Malton, Ontario. These projects were approved and became the Toronto Island Airport and what is now Pearson International Airport. He also advocated the construction of the Mount Pleasant Road extension connecting it to Jarvis Street in order to create a north–south alternative to Yonge Street.

From 1937 to 1943 he was an Ontario Liberal Party Member of Provincial Parliament (MPP) for the Toronto riding of St. David. He enlisted in the Royal Canadian Air Force during World War II and once rose in the legislature to denounce Henry Ford for his lack of support for the Canadian war effort, calling him a "black-hearted American Quisling". As a result, he was transferred by the RCAF to the east coast and was unable to carry out his political duties contributing his electoral defeat in the 1943 provincial election. He ran in the 1947 Ontario Liberal leadership convention but lost to Farquhar Oliver.

He returned to city council in 1946 and campaigned for the provincial government of George Drew to permit the opening of cocktail bars in Toronto. In 1947, the legislature approved the opening of bars in cities with more than 100,000 people. In 1949 he was elected to the Board of Control for the first time.

In 1950, Lamport spearheaded a municipal plebiscite that approved the playing of sports on Sundays. Until then, playing fields and even swings were padlocked under the Lord's Day Act.

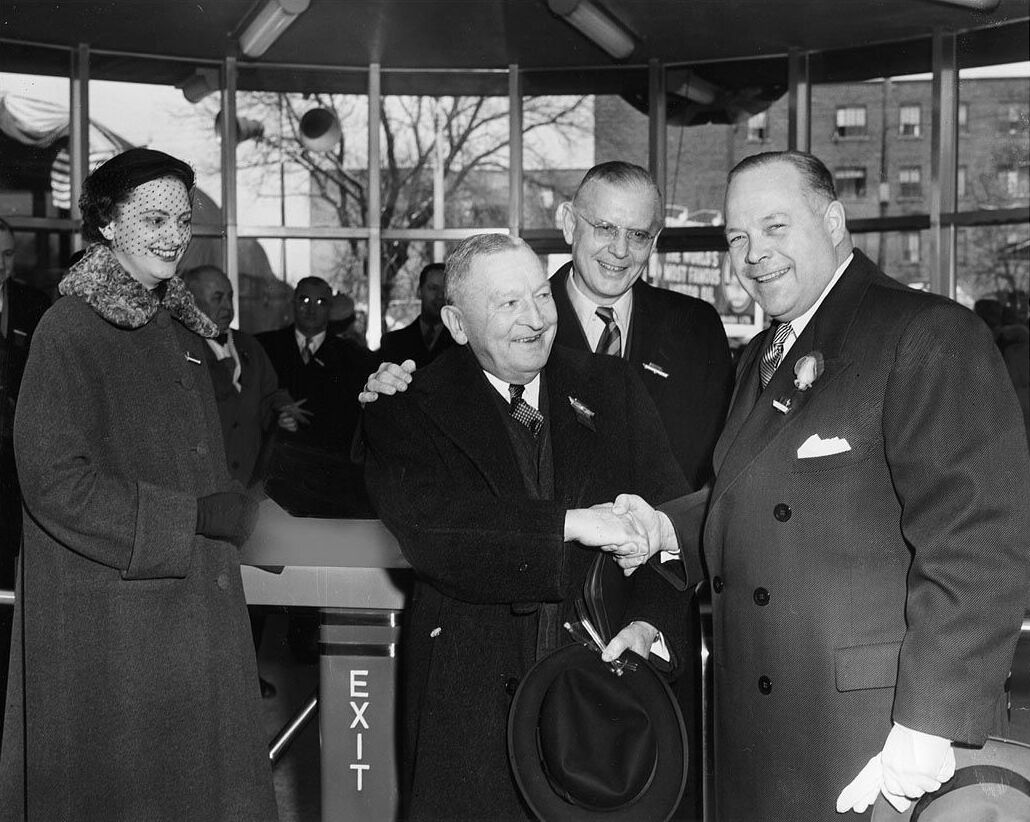
Lamport with Ontario Premier Leslie Frost, at the opening of the Yonge Subway, 1954

He was defeated in his first campaign for mayor in 1951 but won on his second attempt the next year. As mayor, Lamport encouraged the construction of Toronto's subway system which would be Canada's first when it opened in 1954. He also advocated the creation of Regent Park, Canada's first large scale public housing project. Premier Leslie Frost considered Lamport for the position of Chairman of the newly created Municipality of Metropolitan Toronto but he was not interested. Lamport resigned as mayor in 1954 to serve on the Toronto Transit Commission first as vice-chairman and then as chairman from 1955 to 1959 and recommended and won approval for the construction of the Bloor-Danforth subway line. Following a political scandal over control of the TTC, he clashed with then Metro Chairman Fred Gardiner, and was nearly ousted from the TTC.

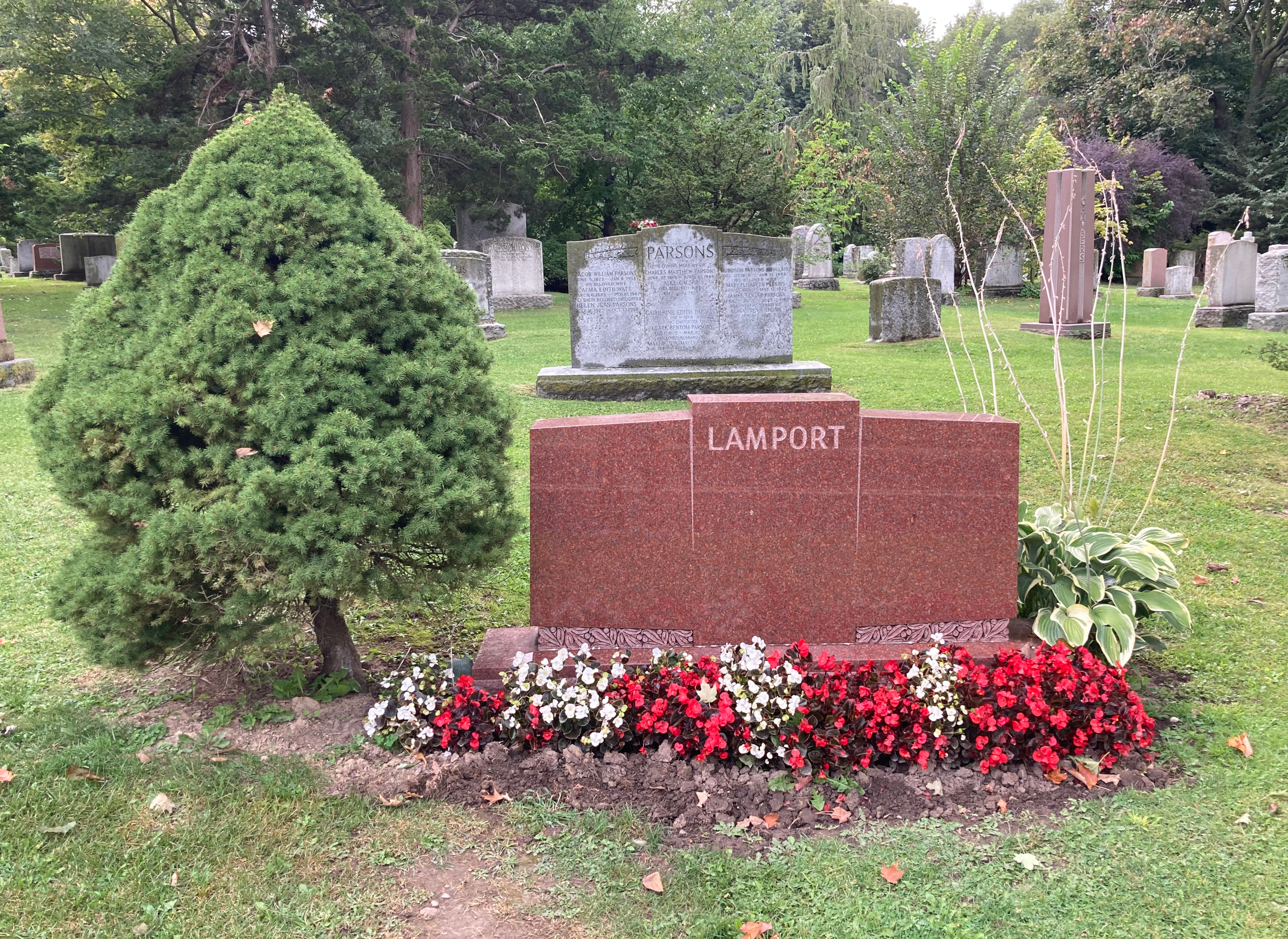
Lamport's grave at Mount Pleasant Cemetery

In 1960, he again ran for mayor but was defeated by Nathan Phillips; in 1962 he won election to the Board of Control. In 1964, he again ran for mayor and was defeated by Philip Givens. He returned to City Council again in 1966 as a Controller, and then as an alderman when the Board of Control was abolished. He famously opposed the hippies who populated the neighbourhood of Yorkville pledging to drive them out of Toronto and encouraging police action against them and urged that the neighbourhood be demolished and replaced by a shopping mall. He clashed with David DePoe, unofficial spokesperson for the Yorkville hippies opposing DePoe's bid to address city council. The confrontation resulted in Lamport ordering police to remove the hippies from the city council chamber This conflict was documented in the National Film Board of Canada films Flowers on a One Way Street and Christopher's Movie Matinée.

In 1994, he was made a Member of the Order of Canada. Lamport Stadium in Toronto and the Allan A. Lamport Regatta Course on Toronto Island are named in his honour. His funeral was arranged through Ralph Day Funeral Home and services were held at St. Paul's Anglican Church and he is buried at Mount Pleasant Cemetery in Toronto.

== Quotations ==
Lamport was known as Metro's Goldwyn Mayor, a take on movie mogul Sam Goldwyn because both of them were known for their malapropisms. He was quoted on many subjects. For example, on the subject of progress he said "All this progress is marvellous... now if only it would stop." On the future, he said "It's hard to make predictions - especially about the future." On achieving the impossible, he said "It's like pushing a car uphill with a rope."

Some of his quotes were related to political life. On being Mayor of Toronto, he said "Being Mayor of Toronto is like being a Prime Minister - without a cabinet or a majority." He once commented on Metro Chairman Fred Gardiner: "Trailing Fred Gardiner is like tracking a bleeding elephant through a fresh fall of snow."

Political offices
Preceded by William G. Russell	Chairman of the Toronto Transit Commission; 1955–1959	Succeeded by Charles A. Walton
