= Stewart Smith (politician) =

Canadian politician

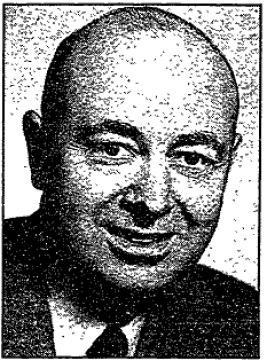
- Stewart Smith

Leader of the Communist Party of Canada (Ontario)
- In office 1951–1957
- Preceded by: A. A. MacLeod
- Succeeded by: Bruce Magnuson

Member of the Toronto Board of Control
- In office 1945–1947
- Succeeded by: John Innes

Member of Toronto City Council for Trinity-Bellwoods
- In office 1943–1944
- Preceded by: Charles Carrie
- Succeeded by: Charles Sims
- In office 1936–1940
- Succeeded by: Charles Carrie

Personal details
- Born: 1907
- Died: October 27, 1993 (aged 85–86)
- Party: Communist Party of Canada (–1957)
- Other political affiliations: Labor-Progressive Party
- Parent: Albert Edward Smith

Stewart Smith (c. 1907 – October 27, 1993) was a long-time leading member of the Communist Party of Canada. He also served on Toronto City Council for a period in the 1930s and 1940s.

== Life and career ==
Smith was the son of Reverend A. E. Smith, a social gospel minister who became a leading figure in the Communist Party. Stewart Smith was one of the main figures in the faction, led by Tim Buck, that took over the party leadership in 1929. Smith was elected to the party's Central Committee and continued to serve on it (and the party's Political Bureau) for decades. He supported the expulsion of Trotskyist and Right Opposition factions from the party. In 1934, Smith wrote the pamphlet Socialism and the C.C.F. which promoted the Communist Party's view that the newly formed democratic socialist Co-operative Commonwealth Federation was an obstacle to socialism which served as a buffer between the working class and the capitalist class that needed to be defeated.

In 1935, Smith led the Canadian delegation to the world congress of the Communist International held in Moscow. When he returned, he echoed the Comintern's new line rejecting the previous Third Period sectarianism of the party and advocating class unity and ultimately Popular Frontism in its stead resulting in the dissolution of the party's red union, the Workers' Unity League into the American Federation of Labour and Congress of Industrial Organizations.

Smith was elected to Toronto City Council as an alderman beginning in 1936 and, in the 1945 municipal election, was elected to the powerful Toronto Board of Control and was elected again in 1946 before being defeated in 1947 as the result of a strong anti-Communist campaign.

Smith, Stanley Ryerson and Leslie Morris were propelled into the leadership of the party in 1940 when the Communist Party was banned and Tim Buck, Sam Carr and Charles Simms fled to New York City to escape arrest. Smith, Ryerson and Morris were made leaders of the party's "operations centre" and effectively led the party until Buck, Carr and Simms returned from exile when the German invasion of the Soviet Union brought the USSR into World War II as an Allied Power.

Smith remained a prominent member of the Labor-Progressive Party (as the Communists were known), and leader of the Labor-Progressive Party of Ontario, until the crisis that hit the international Communist movement in 1956. The combined shock of Nikita Khrushchev's Secret Speech at the Twentieth Party Congress of the Communist Party of the Soviet Union and the Soviet invasion of Hungary led Smith to join the exodus from the party, led by the resignations of Smith, J.B. Salsberg, Harry Binder and Sam Lipshitz, that reduced the LPP to a small rump. He was subsequently written out of the party's history.

After leaving the party, Smith found success as an entrepreneur in the pharmaceutical industry. He built a chain of discount drugstores, selling his business to Shoppers Drug Mart in 1978.

In the 1990s, he authored his autobiography Comrades and Komsomolkas, My Years in the Communist Party of Canada ISBN 0-921633-55-6 .
