= Hiram E. McCallum =

Canadian politician (1899–1989)

Hiram McCallum
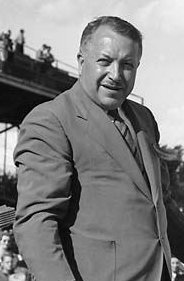
- McCallum in July 1948

49th Mayor of Toronto
- In office 1948–1951
- Preceded by: Robert Hood Saunders
- Succeeded by: Allan A. Lamport

Personal details
- Born: Hiram Emerson McCallum; August 14, 1899 Caledon East, Ontario, Canada
- Died: January 13, 1989 (aged 89) Guelph, Ontario, Canada

Hiram Emerson McCallum (August 14, 1899 – January 13, 1989) was a mayor of Toronto, Ontario, from 1948 to 1951. He served in management roles at the Canadian National Exhibition from 1952 to 1964.

Born in 1899 at Caledon East, Ontario, his first job was at The Mail and Empire newspaper as a clerk in the advertising department. From there, he started his own printing plant in 1931. Concern about pollution in Toronto's Eastern beaches caused McCallum to join a small group of other concerned people. Then in 1941, he became an alderman for Ward 8. From that start, he moved up (in 1946) to vice-chairperson of the city of Toronto's board of control. When then mayor Bob Saunders resigned to become chairman of Ontario Hydro, McCallum became mayor.

As mayor he started Toronto's Yonge Street line and worked towards a regional government. Then in 1950, some 10 years after becoming a politician, he opened a new sewage treatment plant that would reduce pollution in Toronto's Eastern Beaches – his original reason for becoming a politician.

In 1952 he was made assistant general manager of the Canadian National Exhibition, succeeding as general manager in 1953. This would be a position he would hold until his retirement in 1964 at age 65.

He was a member of the Orange Order in Canada.

== Personal life ==
With his wife Margaret he had a daughter Dorothy and a son Bruce, and he was the grandfather of four children. He died at the Guelph General Hospital in 1989.
