= Summerhill, Toronto =

Coordinates: 43.683°N 79.390°W

Summerhill
- Neighbourhood
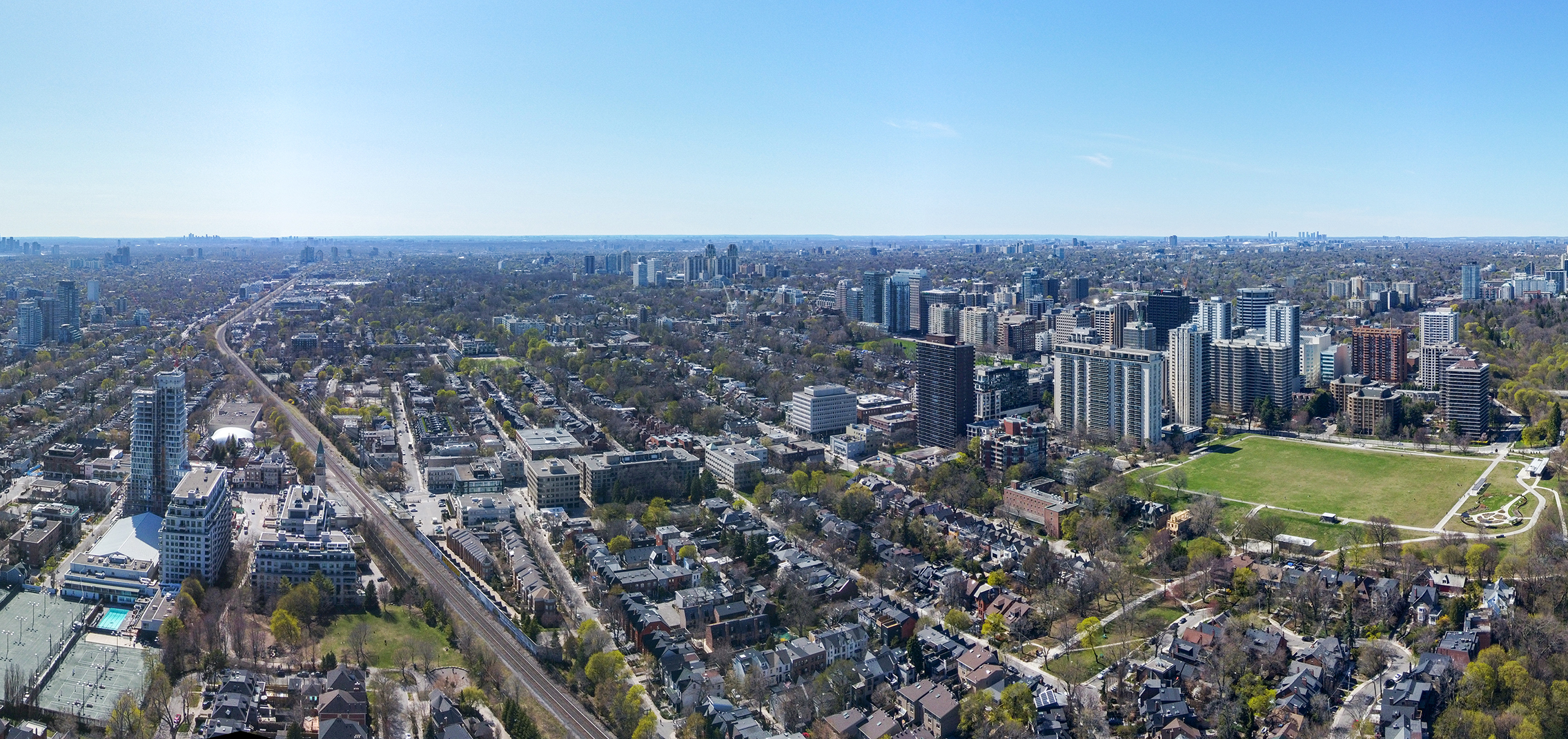
- Aerial view of Summerhill in 2025

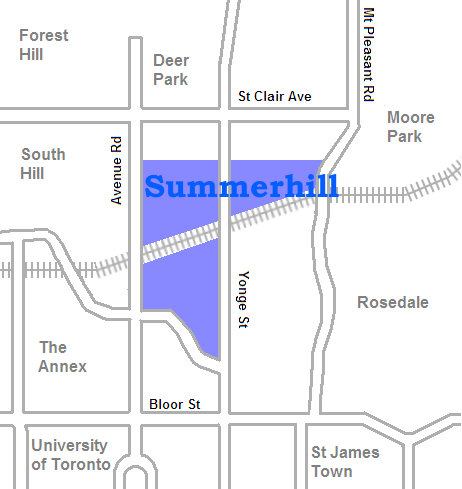
- Country: Canada
- Province: Ontario
- City: Toronto

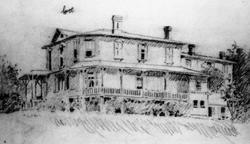
Summer Hill house, c. 1900

Summerhill is a neighbourhood in central Toronto, Ontario, Canada, located north of downtown Toronto.

== History ==
It was named after Summer Hill house, built in 1842 by Canadian transportation magnate Charles Thompson. Much of the area was once part of the original Thompson estate but was subdivided for development during the following decades.

During the 1880s, the North Toronto railway station was established on Yonge Street, and the neighbourhood of Summerhill quickly developed around it. The railway station was rebuilt in 1916 in honour of a visit by the Prince of Wales (later King Edward VIII). The neighbourhood underwent very little growth after the railway station closed in 1931, but it was revitalized by the launch of the Summerhill subway station in 1954.

The railway station from 1916 still exists, and it currently serves as a LCBO outlet. The station, along with the still-operational Canadian Pacific Railway bridge, is a landmark of the neighbourhood. As part of the provincial government's "MoveOntario 2020" program, plans were being considered to return the building to its original use as a train station, serving a planned GO Transit Crosstown line.

== Notable residents ==
- Chrystia Freeland, former politician who was the deputy prime minister of Canada
- Bob Rae, former politician who served as Premier of Ontario

== See also ==
- 64 Woodlawn Avenue West
- De La Salle College (Toronto)
- The York School (Toronto)
