= Nathan Phillips (politician) =

Canadian politician (1892–1976)

Nathan Phillips QC
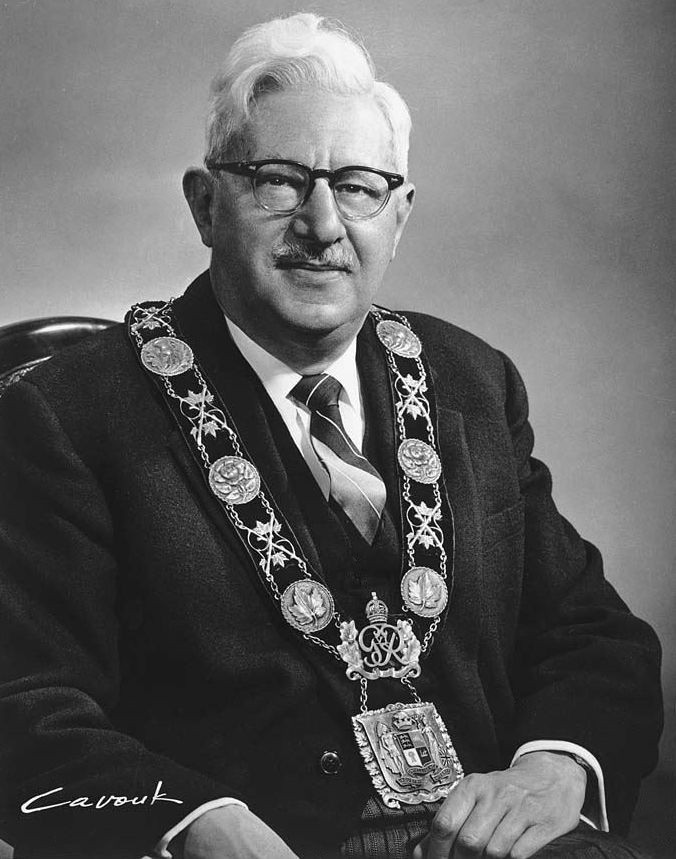
- Phillips wearing the chain of office in 1959

52nd Mayor of Toronto
- In office 1955–1962
- Preceded by: Leslie Saunders
- Succeeded by: Donald D. Summerville

Personal details
- Born: 7 November 1892 Brockville, Ontario, Canada
- Died: 7 January 1976 (aged 83) Toronto, Ontario, Canada
- Resting place: Holy Blossom Memorial Park
- Party: Conservative Party of Canada (1920s–1942); Progressive Conservative Party of Ontario (1942–1976)
- Profession: Lawyer

Nathan Phillips QC (7 November 1892 – 7 January 1976) was a Canadian politician who served as the 53rd mayor of Toronto from 1955 to 1962. A lawyer by training, Phillips was first elected to Toronto City Council in 1924. He is the city's first Jewish mayor, ending an unbroken string of Protestant mayors dating back to 1834 when the city was founded.

His son Howard was elected to City Council several times throughout the late 1940s and 1950s and served with his father, becoming the first alderman father and son combination to serve at the same time in Toronto. When he was first elected mayor, he became known by the moniker "the mayor of all the people" for his fight against intolerance at City Hall. Phillips is mostly remembered as the person that got new City Hall approved and built. The public square attached to City Hall is named after him.

When he lost the 1962 mayoral election, he was the longest serving mayor to that date. He spent the remainder of his life out of politics, attending to his law practice and going on long trips abroad. In later years his cardiac health deteriorated and died from a heart attack at Toronto General Hospital.

== Early and personal life ==
Nathan Phillips was born in Brockville, Ontario, on 7 November 1892, the son of Jacob Phillips and Mary (nee Rosenbloom). He was educated in public and high schools in Cornwall, Ontario. In 1908, he articled with the Cornwall lawyer, Robert Smith, who later would be named to the Supreme Court of Canada. He graduated from Osgoode Hall Law School in 1913, but at 20-years-old, he was too young to be called to the bar. He was called to the Ontario Bar in 1914 when he attained the age of majority, at age 21. He practised law in Toronto and was appointed a King's Counsel in 1929, and was thought to be the youngest person in the British Empire at the time to have that honour.

He married Esther Lyons (1893–1983) on 7 March 1917. They had three children: Lewis; Madeline; and Howard. On Mother's Day, 12 May 1929, a motorist struck and killed Lewis Phillips while he was posting a letter in a mailbox for his father near their Lauder Avenue home. The funeral was the next day, as is Jewish custom, but was held at the family's 26 Lauder Avenue home for immediate family members only. In 1949, Howard along with Nathan, became the first-ever son and father duo to sit as alderman at the same time on the City of Toronto council. Howard represented Ward 3, while Nathan represented Ward 4.

In life after politics, he practised law with his son's law firm and went on extended foreign vacations with his wife. He had a major heart attack in 1973. His health deteriorated after that, and Phillips succumbed to another heart attack on 7 January 1976. A large funeral was held at Holy Blossom Temple attended by many then current and former politicians and dignitaries.

== Political career ==
=== Federal and provincial politics ===
Phillips was a member of the Conservative Party having been involved in founding the Ontario Conservative Party's youth wing and then having run as the Conservative candidate in Spadina in the 1935 federal election. He placed second. Later, Phillips also ran unsuccessfully in St. Andrew riding during the 1937 and 1948 provincial elections.

=== Municipal politics ===
Phillips was first elected to Toronto City Council in 1924 as an alderman for Ward 4. It was the start of a 36-year career in municipal politics.

He was elected mayor on 6 December 1954 to a one-year term that started on 1 January 1955 and became the first Toronto mayor of the Jewish faith. Until his election, all mayors had been Protestant and every mayor since the appointment of Thomas David Morrison in 1836 had been a member of the Orange Order, which dominated the city's political and business establishment. Phillips became mayor by defeating the incumbent Mayor Leslie Howard Saunders, an Orangeman who had stoked controversy with his sectarian comments about the importance of the Battle of the Boyne. Phillips's victory marked a turning point in Toronto history and its transformation from a Protestant, staunchly British and conservative city to a modern multicultural metropolis.

On 23 March 1959 Phillips welcomed the exiled King Peter II of Yugoslavia on an official tour to City Hall but forgot about the Serbian Orthodox Bishop from the Diocese of Chicago that he left waiting in the council chambers. He was supposed to take the Bishop on a tour as well, and caused an incident as the Bishop felt slighted.

From his earliest days as mayor, he advocated for the amalgamation of all the suburbs that comprised Metropolitan Toronto into the City of Toronto. Nathan Phillips is best remembered as the driving force behind the construction of Toronto's New City Hall and the selection of a striking avant-garde design by Finnish architect Viljo Revell. Phillips served five terms as mayor before being defeated in the 1962 Toronto municipal election by Donald Dean Summerville. After Summerville died in office, succumbing to a heart attack during a charity hockey game in November 1963, Phillips was asked to run for mayor in the 1964 election, which he declined because, "I don't want to become controversial again."

== Nathan Phillips Square ==
On 10 October 1961, while still the sitting mayor, Toronto City Council named the future civic square at New City Hall Nathan Phillips Square in his honour. Before a crowd of 500, on his 69th birthday, he broke the ceremonial first sod and hit a button that detonated some explosives to signal the start of construction on the new square and City Hall. When mayor Phil Givens opened the square's skating rink on 29 November 1964, Phillips was there at the ceremony and practicing his photography hobby as well. In November 2005, a proposal by a city councillor to sell the naming rights to Nathan Phillips Square unleashed opposition from many Torontonians, including Phillips's grandchildren. The proposal was withdrawn.
