= 1953 Toronto municipal election =

1953 Toronto mayoral election
- December 7, 1953
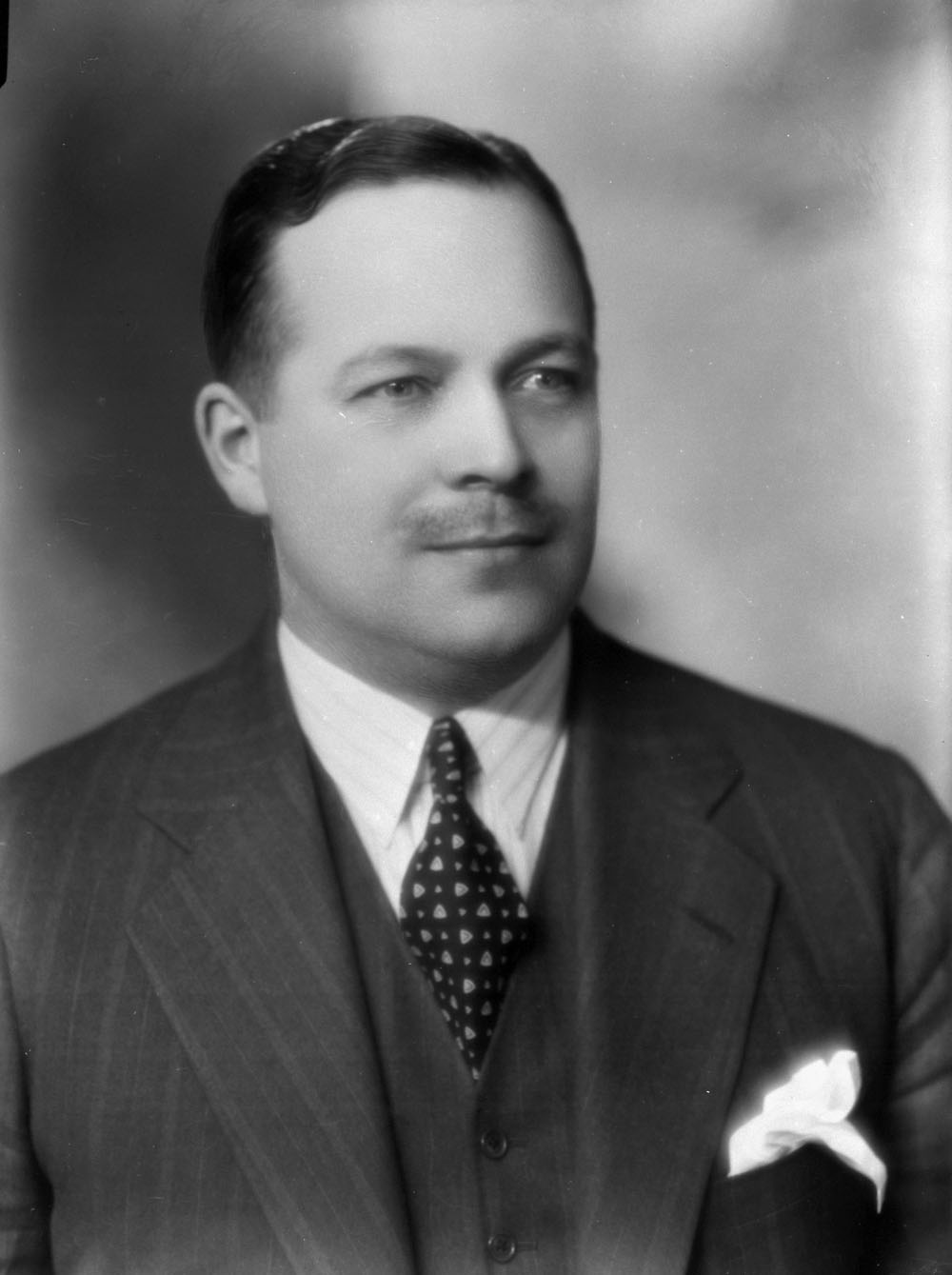
Candidate	Allan Lamport	Arthur J. Brown
Popular vote	55,064	46,080
Percentage	54%	45%
Mayor of Toronto before election
Allan Lamport
Elected Mayor of Toronto
Allan Lamport

Municipal elections were held in Toronto, Ontario, Canada, on December 7, 1953. Incumbent mayor Allan Lamport won an unexpectedly close race against school board chairman Arthur J. Brown. This election was the first for councils in the municipality of Metropolitan Toronto which would be created on January 1, 1954, and was composed of 14 municipalities: the City of Toronto, the towns of New Toronto, Mimico, Weston and Leaside; the villages of Long Branch, Swansea and Forest Hill, and the townships of Etobicoke, York, North York, East York, and Scarborough.

A Metropolitan Toronto Council had come into being on April 15, 1953, and was made up of the Metro Chairman, Frederick Gardiner, who had been appointed by the province, the Mayor of Toronto, the City of Toronto's two most senior Controllers, nine senior aldermen from each of the City of Toronto (the top finisher in each ward), and the twelve suburban mayors and reeves.

== Toronto mayor ==
Lamport had been elected mayor in 1951, and was expected to face no major opposition to his reelection after powerful Controller Leslie Saunders opted not to run. The final result ended up being closer than expected as Brown, who had never run for city council before, came within 10,000 votes. A central issue of the campaign was the introduction of rent control, which Lamport opposed and Brown favoured. Part way through his term, Lamport resigned and was succeeded by Saunders.

Results
Allan Lamport (incumbent) - 55,064
Arthur J. Brown - 46,080

== Board of Control ==
All four Board of Control members were reelected. Labour representative Ford Brand also campaigned on rent control, and increased his vote to almost win second place. Missing a seat was former Alderman Joseph Cornish on his second attempt for a Board seat. As a result of Saunders appointment as mayor alderman Ross Lipsett was appointed to the Board of Control. The unexpected death of Louis Shannon led to a second board appointment, this time of Alderman Roy E. Belyea. The most senior two Controllers in terms of votes also sat on Metro Toronto Council.

Results
Leslie Saunders (incumbent) - 62,397
Louis Shannon (incumbent) - 57,635
Ford Brand (incumbent) - 54,635
David Balfour (incumbent) - 51,393
Joseph Cornish - 46,701
Harry Bradley - 18,686
Harry Hunter - 14,194

== City council ==
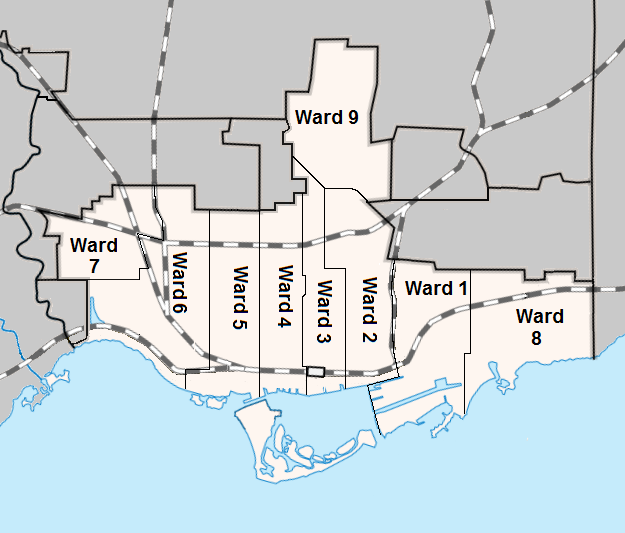
Ward boundaries used in the 1953 election

Due to the acclamation in Ward 1 City Council chose William Allen to represent the ward on Metro Council

In each ward, the alderman with the most votes was declared the senior alderman and sat on both Metro Council and Toronto City Council

Ward 1 (Riverdale)
William Allen (incumbent) - acclaimed
Ken Waters (incumbent) - acclaimed

Ward 2 (Cabbagetown and Rosedale)
William Dennison (incumbent) - 4,821
Edgar Roxborough (incumbent) - 4,254
C.M. Edwards - 2,547
George Taylor - 1,761

Ward 3 (West Downtown and Summerhill)
Howard Phillips (incumbent) - 4,016
John McVicar (incumbent) - 3,919
Richard Newson - 1,062

Ward 4 (The Annex, Kensington Market and Garment District)
Allan Grossman (incumbent) - 5,380
Herbert Orliffe - 4,600
Robert Laxer - 1,507
Bernard Levitt - 1,224
Walton Rose - 956
John Anture - 585

Ward 5 (Trinity-Bellwoods and Little Italy)
Joseph Gould (incumbent) - 7,809
Philip Givens (incumbent) - 7,393
Stewart Smith - 3,305

Ward 6 (Davenport and Parkdale)
May Robinson (incumbent) - 9,810
Frank Clifton (incumbent) - 8,382
Lester Nelson - 4,889
Hector MacArthur - 2,437
Patrick McKeown - 1,238

Ward 7 (West Toronto Junction)
William Davidson (incumbent) - 5,837
John Kucherepa (incumbent) - 4,472
John Duncan - 3,670
John Weir - 968

Ward 8 (The Beaches)
Ross Lipsett (incumbent) - 10,470
Alex Hodgins (incumbent) - 9,632
William Probert - 3,149
James Davis - 2,143
William Square - 893

Ward 9 (North Toronto)
Roy E. Belyea (incumbent) - 12,485
Leonard Reilly (incumbent) - 11,261
David Burt - 5,444
Frederick Vacher - 1,314
George Rolland - 802

Results are taken from the December 8, 1953 Toronto Star and might not exactly match final tallies.

== Changes ==
Controller Louis Shannon died on February 16, 1954. On February 23 Controller Ford Brand was appointed Metro Councillor; Ward 9 Alderman Roy E. Belyea was appointed Controller; Ward 9's remaining Alderman Leonard Reilly was appointed Metro Councillor and David Burt was appointed Alderman.

Mayor Allan Lamport resigned on June 28, 1954, to become vice-chairman of the Toronto Transit Commission. Council accepted his resignation by a vote of 19-2 and then unanimously elected Controller Leslie Saunders as Mayor. On July 7 Controller David Balfour was appointed Metro Councillor; Ward 8 Alderman Ross Lipsett was appointed Controller; Ward 8's remaining Alderman Alex Hodgins was appointed Metro Councillor and William Probert was appointed Alderman.

== Suburbs ==
=== East York ===
Reeve
(incumbent)Harry G. Simpson 5,564
Marie Taylor 3,556

Source: "Suburbs Vote Light, Few Changes Result", The Globe and Mail (1936-Current); Toronto, Ont. [Toronto, Ont]07 Dec 1953: 1

=== Etobicoke ===
Reeve
Beverley Lewis - acclaimed

Deputy Reeve
Edward A. Horton - acclaimed

Councillors

Ward 1 (2 elected)

William H.M. Laughlin - acclaimed
Murray Johnson - acclaimed

Ward 2 (2 elected)

Irene Beatie - 1,566
William R. Hodgson - 1,367
Andrew MacDonald - 1,135

Irene Beatie is the first woman ever elected to Etobicoke Town Council.

Ward 3 (2 elected)

Charles Devlin - acclaimed
Gerald Daub - acclaimed

Ward 4 (1 elected)

John M. Allen - 554
James P. Holmes - 353

(source: The Globe and Mail; Toronto, Ont. [Toronto, Ont]08 Dec 1953, pg 9)

=== Forest Hill, Toronto ===
Reeve
Charles O. Bick (acclaimed)

Source: "Last Ballot Dec. 11: No Changes So Far In Metro Council Slate", The Globe and Mail (1936–2016); Toronto, Ont. [Toronto, Ont]07 Dec 1953: 5

=== Leaside ===
Mayor
Howard T. Burrell - 1,694
D.E. Brown - 1,033
Arthur Donahue - 642

Council (4 elected at large)
Joseph Banigan - 2,176
Howard Dickinson - 2,112
Richard Clarke - 1,982
Charles H. Hiscott - 1,956
E. Shipley Birrell - 1,449
Leonard Hart - 1,335

=== Long Branch ===
Reeve
Marie Curtis (acclaimed)
Deputy Reeve
Crawford Bell (acclaimed)

Source: "Suburbs Vote Light, Few Changes Result", The Globe and Mail (1936-Current); Toronto, Ont. [Toronto, Ont]07 Dec 1953: 1

=== Mimico ===
Mayor
Archibald D. Norris (acclaimed)

Source: "Mimico Mayor Sets a Record With 12 Terms", The Globe and Mail (1936–2016); Toronto, Ont. [Toronto, Ont]04 Dec 1953: 4.

=== New Toronto ===
Mayor
John L. (Jack) Strath 1,279
Harold Trickett 574

New Toronto's election occurred on December 12.

Source: "Strath Wins Mayoralty In New Toronto Vote", The Globe and Mail (1936-Current); Toronto, Ont. [Toronto, Ont]14 Dec 1953: 5.

=== North York ===
Reeve
(incumbent)Fred J. McMahon - acclaimed

=== Scarborough ===
Reeve
Oliver E. Crockford (incumbent) - 8,605
George Mason - 4,071
George Barker - 1,673

=== Swansea ===
Reeve
(incumbent)Dorothy Hague (acclaimed)

=== Weston ===
Mayor
(incumbent)Richard C. Seagrave 1,404
John P. Allan 723

Source: "Suburbs Vote Light, Few Changes Result", The Globe and Mail (1936-Current); Toronto, Ont. [Toronto, Ont]07 Dec 1953: 1

=== York ===
Reeve
(incumbent)Frederick W. Hall 9,604
Charles McMaster 3,921

Source: "Suburbs Vote Light, Few Changes Result", The Globe and Mail (1936-Current); Toronto, Ont. [Toronto, Ont]07 Dec 1953: 1
