= 1952 Toronto municipal election =

1952 Toronto mayoral election
- December 1, 1952
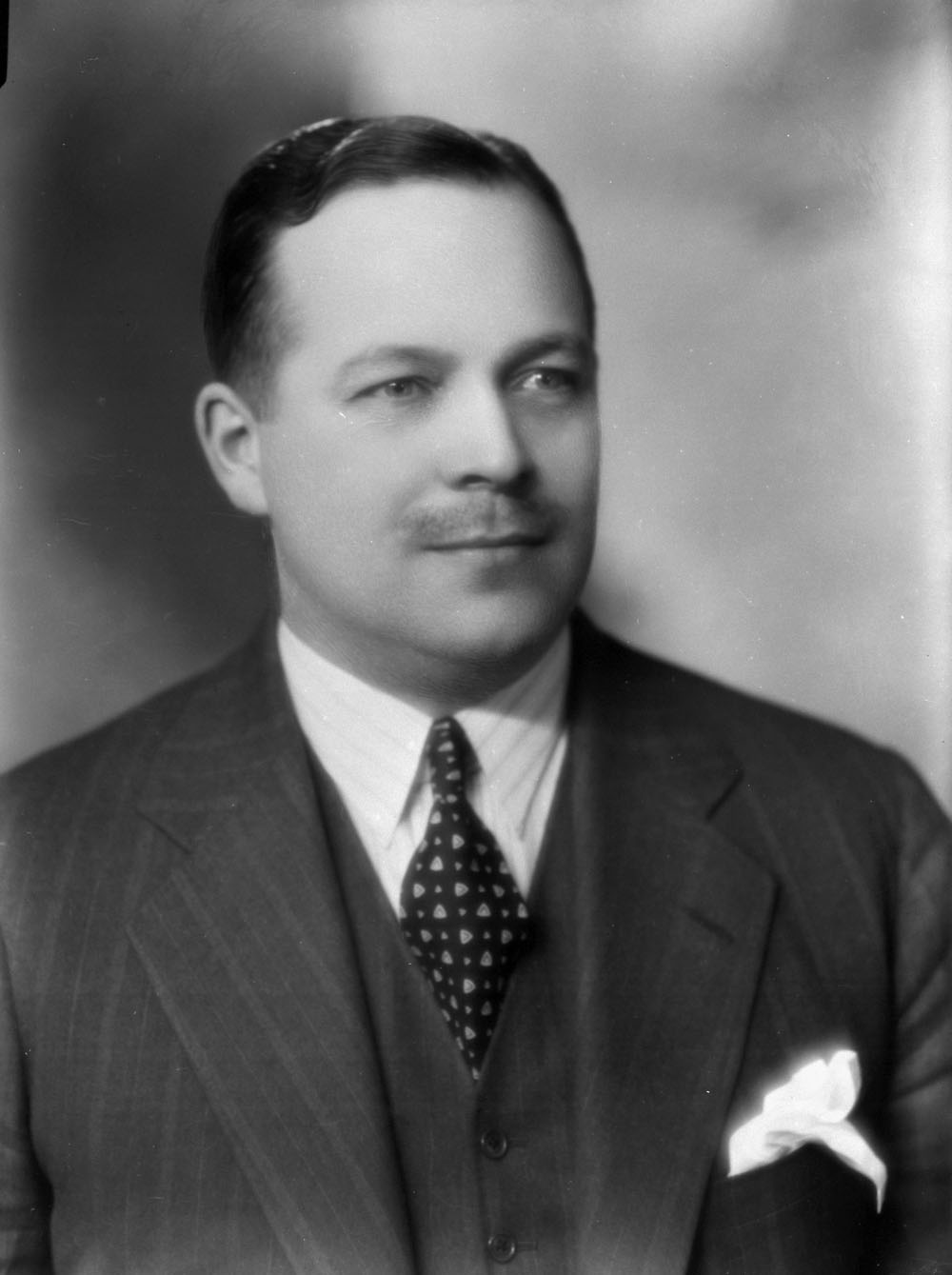

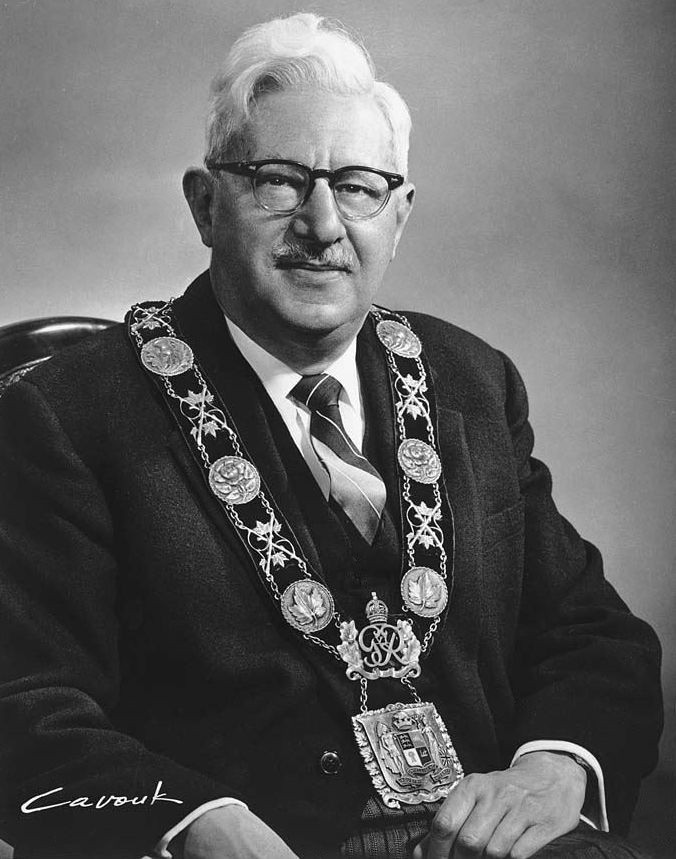
Candidate	Allan Lamport	Nathan Phillips
Popular vote	81,448	41,923
Percentage	66%	33%
Mayor of Toronto before election
Allan Lamport
Elected Mayor of Toronto
Allan Lamport

Municipal elections were held in Toronto, Ontario, Canada, on December 1, 1952. Incumbent mayor Allan Lamport easily won against former alderman Nathan Phillips.

There were two referendum questions on the ballot. One called for municipal terms in the city to be extended from one year to two. This measure was rejected, but was later passed in the 1955 election. The second measure was to approve funds for the construction of the Regent Park housing project, which was passed by a slim margin.

The province of Ontario passed legislation on April 7, 1953, federating the City of Toronto and twelve surrounding suburban townships and villages into the municipality of Metropolitan Toronto. A Metropolitan Toronto Council came into being on April 15, 1953, and was made up of the Metro Chairman, Frederick Gardiner, who had been appointed by the province, the Mayor of Toronto, the City of Toronto's two most senior Controllers, nine senior aldermen from each of the City of Toronto (the top finisher in each ward), and the twelve suburban mayors and reeves.

== Toronto mayor ==
Lamport and Phillips had contested the mayoralty a year earlier in 1951. Phillips' vote increased substantially in the rematch, but Lamport was still easily reelected.

Results:

Allan Lamport - 81,448
Nathan Phillips - 41,923

== Board of Control ==
All four incumbents were reelected to the Board of Control despite several high-profile candidates running as well. Two sitting aldermen, Joseph Cornish and John McMechan, ran for spots, but finished fifth and sixth. In seventh was former Controller and Communist Stewart Smith.

Results

Leslie Saunders (incumbent) - 71,597
Louis Shannon (incumbent) - 61,154
David Balfour (incumbent) - 58,898
Ford Brand (incumbent) - 58,648
Joseph Cornish - 41,086
John McMechan - 30,219
Stewart Smith - 19,061
Harry Bradley - 17,480
Frederick Vacher - 7,065
Mahoney - 7,046

== City council ==
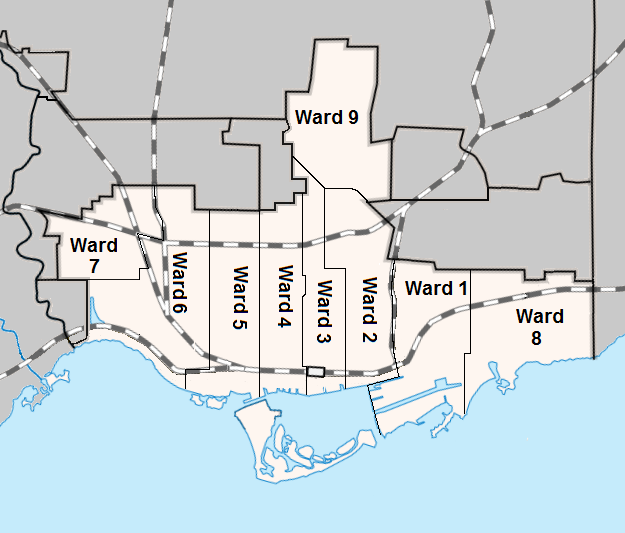
Ward boundaries used in the 1952 election

Ward 1 (Riverdale)

William Allen (incumbent) - 9,886
Ken Waters - 8,583
Spence - 2,368
Morrison - 1,961

Ward 2 (Cabbagetown and Rosedale)

William Dennison - 4,090
Edgar Roxborough - 3,657
C.M. Edwards - 2,436
Irene Nash - 1,086
Wilson - 1,085
Ross - 843
Taylor - 773
Burke - 611
Hill - 490

Ward 3 (West Downtown and Summerhill)

John McVicar (incumbent) - 4,826
Howard Phillips (incumbent) - 4,154
Richard Newson - 1,238

Ward 4 (The Annex, Kensington Market and Garment District)

Allan Grossman (incumbent) - 6,143
Francis Chambers (incumbent) - 5,920
Norman Freed - 3,156
Henderson - 1,053

Ward 5 (Trinity-Bellwoods and Little Italy)

Joseph Gould - 6,490
Philip Givens (incumbent) - 6,294
Harold Menzies - 4,851
Charles Sims - 3,692
Lockhart - 1,372

Ward 6 (Davenport and Parkdale)

May Robinson (incumbent) - 10,291
Frank Clifton - 7,177
Lester Nelson - 6,350
Colucci - 4,065
Hector MacArthur - 2,174
Genovese - 1,747
Patrick McKeown - 1,112

Ward 7 (West Toronto Junction)

William Davidson (incumbent) - 6,017
John Kucherepa (incumbent) - 4,441
John Duncan - 4,260
Selkirk - 2,919

Ward 8 (The Beaches)

Ross Lipsett (incumbent) - 11,898
Alex Hodgins (incumbent) - 10,913
McNulty - 4,671
William Probert - 3,603
John Square - 893

Ward 9 (North Toronto)

Roy E. Belyea (incumbent) - 14,007
Leonard Reilly (incumbent) - 10,241
David Burt - 9,807

Results are taken from the December 3, 1953 Toronto Star and might not exactly match final tallies.

== Outside Toronto ==
=== East York ===
(Election held on December 14)

Reeve

Harry G. Simpson - acclaimed

Deputy Reeve

Marie Taylor - 3,994
Norman Cheeseman - 3,635

=== Etobicoke ===
(Election held on December 6)

Reeve

Beverley Lewis (acclaimed)

Deputy Reeve

Edward A. Horton - 7,297
William V. Muir - 2,765

=== Forest Hill ===
Reeve

Charles O. Bick - acclaimed

Deputy Reeve

Lawrence Simonsky - acclaimed

=== Leaside ===
(Election held on December 14)

Mayor

Howard T. Burrell - 2,340
Robert Clark - 1,098

Reeve

David Brown (acclaimed)

Deputy Reeve

Royce Frith - 1,839
Ernest Frey - 1,779

=== Long Branch ===
(Election held on December 6)

Reeve

Marie Curtis - 1,318
Thomas Carter (incumbent) - 1,168

=== Mimico ===
Mayor

- A.D. Norris (acclaimed)

=== New Toronto ===
Mayor

E.W. Grant (acclaimed)

=== North York ===
(Election held on December 1)

Reeve

Fred McMahon - 6,382
Nelson A. Boylen (incumbent) - 4,771
H.C. Gay - 4,256
Peter N. Byberg - 2,629

Source: "Lawyer Provides Upset: 3-Time North York Reeve Beaten", The Globe and Mail (1936–2016); Toronto, Ont. [Toronto, Ont]02 Dec 1952: C5. and "McMahon defeats Boylen in N. York", Toronto Daily Star (1900–1971); Toronto, Ontario [Toronto, Ontario]02 Dec 1952: 22.

=== Scarborough ===
(Election held on December 6)

Reeve

Oliver E. Crockford - 8,428
James Vander Meulen - 3,803

=== Swansea ===
Reeve

Dorothy Hague - acclaimed

=== Weston ===
Mayor

Richard C. Seagrave (acclaimed)

Reeve

J.F. Petrie (acclaimed)

Deputy Reeve

Ernest Lunnon (acclaimed)

=== York Township ===
(Election held on December 8)

Reeve

Frederick W. Hall - 10,288
Charles McMaster - 5,178
