= 1954 Toronto municipal election =

Canadian municipal election

1954 Toronto mayoral election
- December 6, 1954
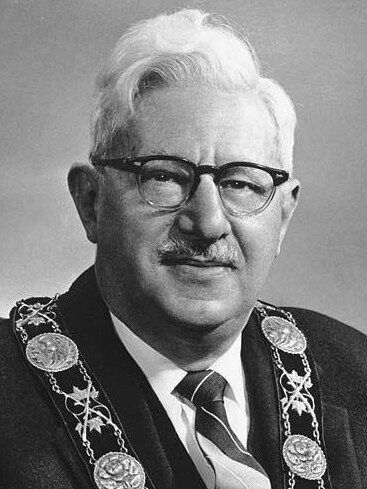

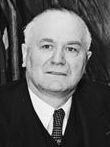
			AB
Candidate	Nathan Phillips	Leslie Saunders	Arthur J. Brown
Popular vote	40,683	36,756	36,613
Percentage	34.2%	30.9%	30.8%
Mayor of Toronto before election
Leslie Saunders
Elected Mayor of Toronto
Nathan Phillips

Municipal elections were held in Toronto, Ontario, Canada, on December 6, 1954. Incumbent mayor Leslie Saunders was defeated by Nathan Phillips in a close contest.

== Toronto mayor ==
Controller Leslie Saunders had been appointed mayor after the resignation of Allan Lamport, who left to work with the Toronto Transit Commission. He was challenged by Nathan Phillips, a longtime city councilor who had made a previous attempt to win the mayoralty. Phillips was Jewish, a sharp departure from the standard for Toronto mayors, who for decades had been Protestant Orange Order members.

Phillips' religion was an important issue in the election. Saunders publicly proclaimed he was running as "Leslie Saunders, Protestant". Saunders was a leader of the Orange Order and the publisher of the radical monthly newspaper Protestant Action. His anti-Catholicism and proclamations that Toronto was a "Protestant city" had caused controversy in the past. One of his first acts after ascending to the mayoralty was to issue an official proclamation commemorating The Twelfth, the anniversary of the victory of William of Orange over the Irish.

A second controversy arose during the election when candidate Arthur J. Brown released accusations about room 1735 in the Royal York hotel. He argued that the room was a secret entertainment suite paid for by the city for the use of the mayor. Saunders claims that it was rented by Mayor Lamport and that he was totally unaware of the suite. Nonetheless the scandal hurt his reelection bid.

Also running was former school board head Arthur Brown, who had previously come close to defeating Lamport for the job, and who had the support of the Globe and Mail newspaper. The Toronto Star and the Telegram both supported Phillips. Saunders in his memoirs accuses Brown of splitting the "Christian and Gentile vote" and getting Phillips elected.

The fourth candidate was Communist A. A. MacLeod, former Labor-Progressive Party M.P.P in the Ontario legislature for Bellwoods.

Results
Nathan Phillips - 40,683
Leslie Saunders - 36,756
Arthur J. Brown - 36,613
A. A. MacLeod - 4,932

== Board of Control ==
Saunders' appointment to the mayoralty led to the appointment of Alderman Ross Lipsett to the Board of Control. This controversially passed over former Alderman Joseph Cornish, who had finished fifth in the 1953 election. In the 1954 election, Cornish displaced Lipsett to win the fourth and final seat on the Board. The most senior two Controllers in terms of votes also sat on Metro Toronto Council.

Results
Ford Brand (incumbent) - 69,540
Roy E. Belyea (incumbent) - 66,223
David Balfour (incumbent) - 62,871
Joseph Cornish - 55,277
Ross Lipsett (incumbent) - 45,385
Harry Bradley - 20,488
Harry Hunter - 14,114
Ben Nobleman - 9,413
George Rolland - 5,280

== City council ==
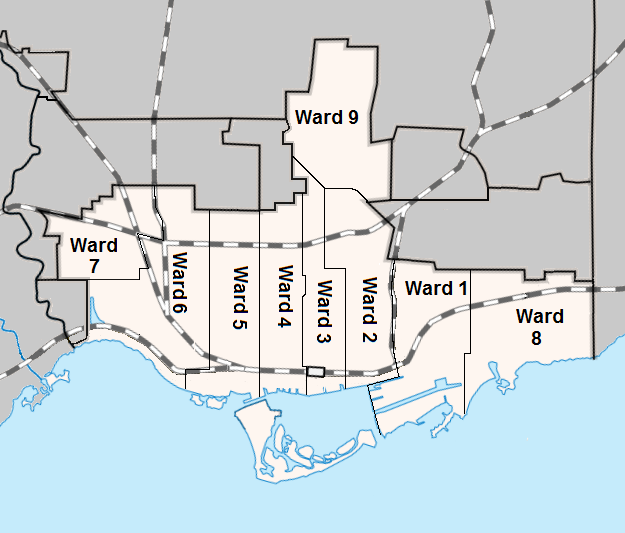
Ward boundaries used in the 1954 election

Two aldermen were elected per Ward. The alderman with the most votes was declared Senior Alderman and sat on both Toronto City Council and Metro Council.

Ward 1 (Riverdale)
William Allen (incumbent) - 8,855
Ken Waters (incumbent) - 8,042
George Phillips - 2,282
Stanley Hare - 1,381
Thornley - 932

Ward 2 (Regent Park and Rosedale)
William Dennison (incumbent) - 4,831
Edgar Roxborough (incumbent) - 4,479
Douglas Shaw - 2,268
C.M. Edwards - 1,551
Morrison - 669
Philip Rowley - 647

Ward 3 (West Downtown and Summerhill)
Howard Phillips (incumbent) - acclaimed
John MacVicar (incumbent) - acclaimed

Phillips was chosen to become Metro Councillor.

Ward 4 (The Annex, Kensington Market and Garment District)
Allan Grossman (incumbent) - 6,455
Herbert Orliffe (incumbent) - 5,345
Robert Laxer - 1,368
Bernard Levitt - 1,307
Blainey - 756

Ward 5 (Trinity-Bellwoods and Little Italy)
Philip Givens (incumbent) - 7,470
Joseph Gould (incumbent) - 6,770
Stewart Smith - 2,678
Teslia - 2,105

Ward 6 (Davenport and Parkdale)
May Robinson (incumbent) - 11,349
Frank Clifton (incumbent) - 10,470
Grittani - 2,763
Hector MacArthur - 2,067
Tennant - 1,684
Muir - 1,561
Patrick McKeown - 1,039

Ward 7 (Bloor West Village)
William Davidson (incumbent) - 6,228
John Kucherepa (incumbent) - 4,989
John Duncan - 3,951
John Weir - 1,915

Ward 8 (The Beaches)
Donald Summerville - 10,002
Alex Hodgins (incumbent) - 8,327
Albert G. Cranham - 6,485
William Probert (incumbent) - 3,169
McNulty - 2,553
James Davis - 1,210
John Square - 384

Ward 9 (North Toronto)
Jean Newman - 14,873
Leonard Reilly (incumbent) - 11,261
David Burt (incumbent) - 9,819
Frederick Vacher - 1,394

Results are taken from the December 7, 1954 Toronto Star and might not exactly match final tallies.

== Suburbs ==
=== East York ===
Reeve
Harry G. Simpson - 3,723
Jack Allen - 2,613
John Warren - 2,211

Source: "East York Returns Reeve for 8th Term", The Globe and Mail (1936-2016); Toronto, Ont. [Toronto, Ont]06 Dec 1954: 1.

=== Etobicoke ===
Reeve
Beverley Lewis (acclaimed)

Deputy Reeve
Henry O. Waffle - 7,513
William R. Hodgson - 4,608

Source: Toronto Daily Star (1900-1971); Toronto, Ontario [Toronto, Ontario]07 Dec 1954: 7.

=== Forest Hill ===
Reeve
Charles O. Bick (acclaimed)

Source: Toronto Daily Star (1900-1971); Toronto, Ontario [Toronto, Ontario]07 Dec 1954: 7.

=== Leaside ===
Mayor
(incumbent)Howard T. Burrell (acclaimed)

Source: "Weston, Leaside Voters To Elect 10 Councillors", The Globe and Mail (1936-2016); Dec 3, 1954; ProQuest Historical Newspapers: pg. 8

=== Long Branch ===
Reeve
(incumbent)Marie Curtis 2,020
Sherman Anderson 248

Election occurred on December 11.

Source: "Mrs. Marie Curtis Reeve Again By An Overwhelming Majority", Toronto Daily Star, December 13, 1954, pg 10

=== Mimico ===
Mayor
William Arthur (Gus) Edwards 1,669
(incumbent)Archibald Douglas Norris 1,256

Election occurred on December 11.

Source: "Reeve W. Edwards Defeats Mayor Norris At Mimico", Toronto Daily Star, December 13, 1954, pg 10

=== New Toronto ===
Mayor
Donald Russell 1,811
(incumbent)John L. (Jack) Strath 841

Election occurred on December 11.

Source: "Mayor Strath Defeated. D. Russell Easy Winner", Toronto Daily Star, December 13, 1954, pg 10

=== North York ===
Reeve
(incumbent)Fred J. McMahon - 18,224
Samuel Wagman - 3,837

Source: Toronto Daily Star (1900-1971); Toronto, Ontario [Toronto, Ontario]07 Dec 1954: 7.

=== Scarborough ===
Reeve
Oliver E. Crockford - 9,064
Richard Sutton - 8,036
Hilda Murray - 1,052

Deputy Reeve
Augustus Harris - 10,010
Fred Sloky - 7,889

Source: Toronto Daily Star (1900-1971); Toronto, Ontario [Toronto, Ontario]07 Dec 1954: 7.

=== Swansea ===
Reeve
(incumbent)Dorothy Hague (acclaimed)

=== Weston ===
Mayor

Harry Clark (acclaimed)

Source: "Election Returns", The Globe and Mail (1936-2016); Toronto, Ont. [Toronto, Ont]06 Dec 1954: 32

=== York ===
Reeve
(incumbent)Frederick W. Hall - 10,724
Charles McMaster - 3,178
Norman Penner - 1,723

Source: "Election Results", The Globe and Mail (1936-2016); Toronto, Ont. [Toronto, Ont]06 Dec 1954: 32.
