= 1958 Toronto municipal election =

1958 Toronto mayoral election
- December 1, 1958
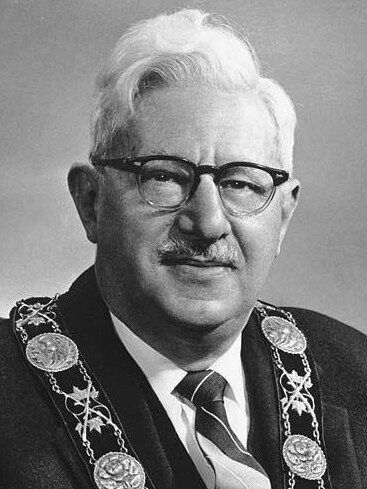

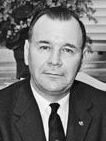

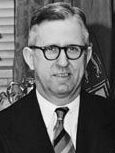
| Candidate | Nathan Phillips | Ford Brand | Joseph Cornish |
| Popular vote | 53,776 | 30,736 | 17,089 |
| Percentage | 52.9% | 30.3% | 16.8% |
Mayor of Toronto before election
Nathan Phillips
Elected Mayor of Toronto
Nathan Phillips

Municipal elections were held in Toronto, Ontario, Canada, on December 1, 1958. Four year incumbent mayor Nathan Phillips won reelection against Controller Ford Brand, who was supported by the Co-operative Commonwealth Federation and Toronto Labour Council, and Controller Joseph Cornish.

== Toronto mayor ==
One of the central issues was the proposal to develop the south side of Queen Street across from the new Toronto City Hall.

Results
Nathan Phillips - 53,776
Ford Brand - 30,736
Joseph Cornish - 17,089

== Plebiscite ==
A vote was held on extending the municipal franchise to all people who are aged 21 and over who are British subjects and have lived in the city for at least one year. At the time of the plebiscite, the right to vote was restricted to property owners and people living in two or more rooms with an assessed value of $400 or more. A similar plebiscite had been held in 1956 and passed by a margin of 56,000 to 26,000 but when the city asked the provincial government to pass legislation enacting the change, the government instead passed legislation allowing each municipality in the province to hold a referendum and so Toronto was required to put the question on the ballot again.

Extending the franchise
Yes - 59,729
No - 22,436

== Board of Control ==
The two sitting controllers running for reelection to the Board of Control, Jean Newman and William Allen, easily won reelection. Newman topped the polls for the second time and after the election she immediately announced her intention to run for mayor in 1960. The decision of Brand and Cornish to run for mayor opened two vacancies on the board. These were won by conservative east end Alderman Donald Summerville and Co-operative Commonwealth Federation-backed Alderman William Dennison. Only narrowly losing was former Toronto mayor Leslie Saunders. Other notable candidates included former Controller Roy E. Belyea, Alderman Ross Parry, and anti-Blue Laws advocate James Karfilis.

The most senior two Controllers in terms of votes also sat on Metro Toronto Council.

Results
Jean Newman (incumbent) - 59,243
William Allen (incumbent) - 52,462
Donald Summerville - 49,476
William Dennison - 33,612
Leslie Saunders - 33,469
Roy E. Belyea - 27,024
Ross Parry - 25,195
James Karfilis - 10,971
Harry Bradley - 10,499
Ross Dowson - 4,539
George Rolland - 3,834

== City council ==
Two aldermen were elected per Ward. The alderman with the most votes was declared Senior Alderman and sat on both Toronto City Council and Metro Council.

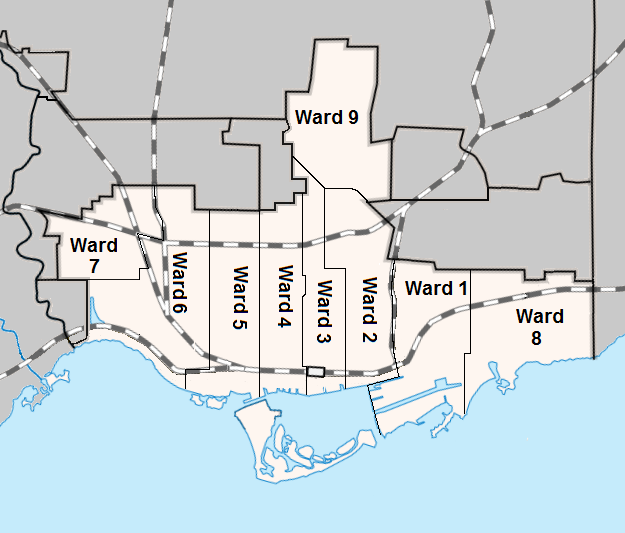
Ward boundaries used in the 1958 election

Ward 1 (Riverdale)
Ken Waters (incumbent) - 7,675
Fred Beavis (incumbent) - 5,540
William Lang - 4,321
Peter Metheus - 1,159
Joe Rosenblatt - 521

Ward 2 (Regent Park and Rosedale)
May Birchard (incumbent) - 3,355
Margaret Campbell - 3,295
Michael Grayson - 2,624
Stanley Price - 2,552
Douglas Shaw - 1,138
George Taylor - 925
Edwards - 881
Hugh Dowson - 520

Ward 3 (West Downtown and Summerhill)
William Archer - 3,307
Charles Tidy - 2,601
John MacVicar (incumbent) - 1,980
Gordon Peck - 1,480
Richard James - 1,288
Ralph Meakes - 576
James Sanderson - 308

Ward 4 (The Annex, Kensington Market and Garment District)
Herbert Orliffe (incumbent) - 4,256
Francis Chambers (incumbent) - 3,600
David Rotenberg - 2,631
Mark Frank - 802
Albert Finkelstein - 794
Dorothy Cureatz - 500

Ward 5 (Trinity-Bellwoods and Little Italy)
Philip Givens (incumbent) - 4,897
Harold Menzies (incumbent) - 3,866
Louis Lockhart - 2,085
Joseph Piccininni - 1,268
Peter D'Agostino - 1,086
Ben Nobleman - 823
Paul Pauk - 792
John Anture - 541
John Mracek - 488
Anthony Fascioni - 478

Ward 6 (Davenport and Parkdale)
May Robinson (incumbent) - 8,492
Frank Clifton (incumbent) - 8,035
George Jackson - 2,761
Pauline Miles - 2,037
William Stevens - 2,008
Kenneth Sutherland - 1,607

Ward 7 (Bloor West Village)
Mary Temple - 4,339
William Davidson (incumbent) - 4,211
Thomas Wilson (incumbent) - 3,009
John O'Shea - 1,802
William Otis - 480

Ward 8 (The Beaches)
A.G. Cranham (incumbent) - 9,216
Alex Hodgins - 7,516
Chris Stavro - 5,276
Stanley Baker - 2,691
Edward Cox - 2,367
John Square - 1,341

Ward 9 (North Toronto)
Frank Nash (incumbent) - acclaimed
Kenneth Ostrander (incumbent) - acclaimed

Nash chosen Metro Councillor

Results are taken from the December 2, 1958 Toronto Star and might not exactly match final tallies.

== Suburbs ==
=== East York ===
Reeve
(incumbent)Jack Raymond Allen - 5,259
Harry G. Simpson - 4,655

=== Etobicoke ===
Reeve
(incumbent)Henry Oscar Waffle - 10,963
Kerr - 9,787

=== Forest Hill ===
Reeve
(incumbent)Laurie T. Simonsky (acclaimed)

=== Leaside ===
Mayor
(incumbent)Charles Hiscott - 2,338
Page - 1,286

=== Long Branch ===
Reeve
(incumbent)Marie Curtis - 1,391
Cambers - 525

=== Mimico ===
Mayor
(incumbent)William Arthur (Gus) Edwards - 1,654
Hugh Griggs - 1,464

=== New Toronto ===
Mayor
(incumbent)Donald Russell (acclaimed)

=== North York ===
Reeve
Norman C. Goodhead 18,238
James Walker - 14,405

Source: Toronto Daily Star (1900-1971); Toronto, Ontario [Toronto, Ontario]. 02 Dec 1958: 8.

=== Scarborough ===
Reeve
(incumbent)Albert Campbell - 12,153
Augustus Harris - 6,710
Taylor - 6,686
Broley - 1,581

=== Swansea ===
Reeve
(incumbent)Dorothy Hague (acclaimed)

=== Weston ===
Mayor
Jack L. Holley - 1,333
Clark - 924

=== York ===
Reeve
(incumbent):Chris Tonks - 11,364
Charles McMaster - 3,258
Betty Shapero - 1,643
