= 1955 Toronto municipal election =

1955 Toronto mayoral election
- December 5, 1955
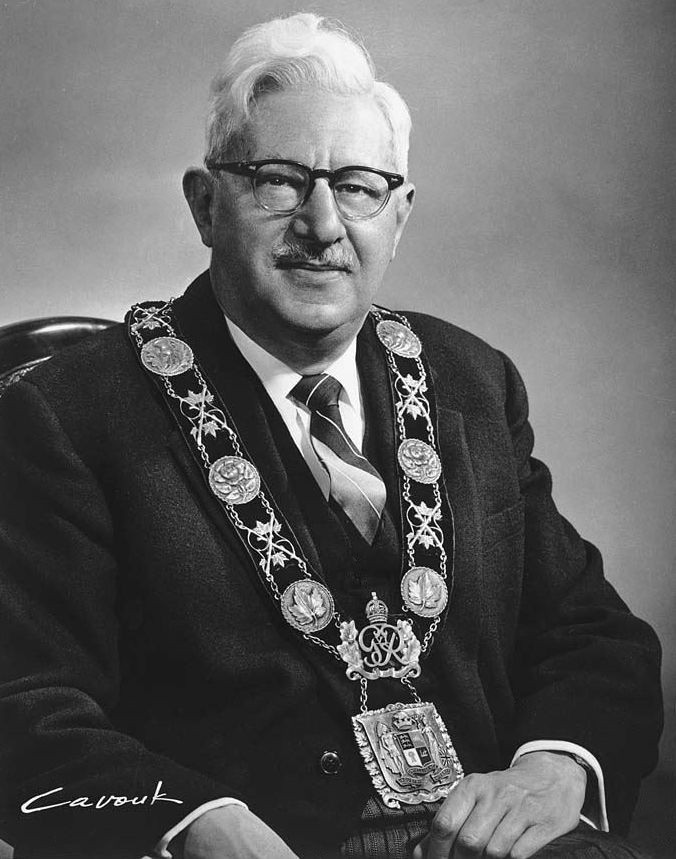
Candidate	Nathan Phillips	Roy E. Belyea
Popular vote	70,647	26,717
Percentage	70%	26%
Mayor of Toronto before election
Nathan Phillips
Elected Mayor of Toronto
Nathan Phillips

Municipal elections were held in Toronto, Ontario, Canada, on December 5, 1955. Incumbent mayor Nathan Phillips, elected a year earlier, was easily reelected, defeating Controller Roy E. Belyea and Trotskyist Ross Dowson.

Two referendums were held with the elections. One, which passed, was to extend the municipal term to two years. Previously elections had been held every year. There was also a vote on funding a new Toronto City Hall, which was rejected by voters.

== Toronto mayor ==
Nathan Phillips was opposed for reelection after his first year in office by Board of Control member Roy E. Belyea, who had been a staunch opponent of Phillips during the year. Also running was Trotskyist Ross Dowson.

Results

Nathan Phillips – 70,647
Roy E. Belyea – 26,717
Ross Dowson – 2,374

== Plebiscites ==
Two questions appeared on the ballot. The first was on whether municipal terms of office should be extended to two years from one. The second was to authorize the construction of a proposed new city hall to replace the existing city hall, which had been built in 1899. The proposed structure, designed by a partnership of three leading Toronto architectural forms, would have been a conservative, symmetrical limestone-clad building in the Modernist style facing a landscaped square, and was widely criticized as "drab and boxy".

Two-year term

For – 48,024
Against – 33,688

Two-year terms would be put in place effective the 1956 Toronto municipal election.

New City Hall

For – 28,449
Against – 32,564

As a result of the rejection of the proposed structure, city council decided, in 1956, to hold an [international architectural design competition to find a better design. A proposal by Finnish architect Viljo Revell would be accepted. Construction of New City Hall began in 1961, and the building was officially opened on 13 September 1965.

== Board of Control ==
There were two vacancies on the Board of Control after Roy E. Belyea's decision to run for mayor and Controller David Balfour's decision to retire. The most senior two Controllers in terms of votes also sat on Metro Toronto Council.

Results

Ford Brand (incumbent) – 59,264
Joseph Cornish (incumbent) – 55,162
William Allen – 53,455
Leslie Saunders – 46,528
Arthur Brown – 41,351
Harry Bradley – 14,802
Alex Hodgins – 13,503
Harry Hunter – 9,493
George Rolland – 3,923
George Stanton – 3,863

== City council ==
Two aldermen were elected per Ward. The alderman with the most votes was declared Senior Alderman and sat on both Toronto City Council and Metro Council.

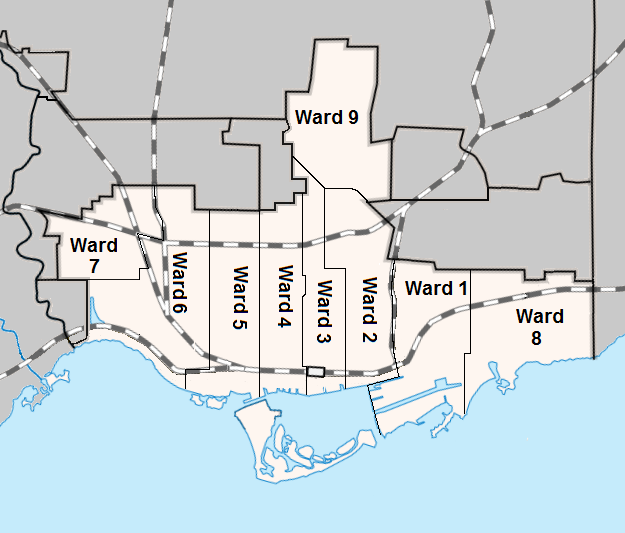
Ward boundaries used in the 1955 election

Ward 1 (Riverdale)

Ken Waters (incumbent) – 6,945
George Phillips – 2,916
Fred Beavis – 2,828
Stanley Hare – 2,137
Christie – 1,403
Montgomery – 960
Basil Ingleby – 886
Jean Brown – 3,412

Ward 2 (Regent Park and Rosedale)

William Dennison (incumbent) – 5,366
Edgar Roxborough (incumbent) – 4,051
May Birchard – 2,127
Douglas Shaw – 1,528
Philip Rowley – 683

Ward 3 (West Downtown and Summerhill)

Ross Parry – 4,149
Howard Phillips (incumbent) – 2,802
John MacVicar (incumbent) – 2,260
Richard James – 1,737

Ward 4 (The Annex, Kensington Market and Garment District)

Herbert Orliffe (incumbent) – 4,515
Francis Chambers – 3,746
David Rotenberg – 2,086
Robert Laxer – 1,073
Levitt – 824
John Anture – 386
Dorothy Cureatz – 362

Ward 5 (Trinity-Bellwoods and Little Italy)

Philip Givens (incumbent) – 5,605
Harold Menzies – 4,929
Teslia – 1,907
Paul Pauk – 1,228
Tennant – 1,140
Di Stasi – 872

Ward 6 (Davenport and Parkdale)

May Robinson (incumbent) – 10,233
Frank Clifton (incumbent) – 9,473
Grittani – 2,797
George Jackson – 2,274

Ward 7 (Bloor West Village)

William Davidson (incumbent) – 5,506
John Kucherepa (incumbent) – 4,993
Thomas Wilson – 2,124
William Repka – 653

Ward 8 (The Beaches)

Donald Summerville (incumbent) – 13,139
Albert G. Cranham – 8,456
Brawley – 2,542
Chris Stavro – 1,682
Davis – 1,252
John Square – 529

Ward 9 (North Toronto)

Jean Newman (incumbent) – 14,984
Frank Nash – 12,736
Waterfield – 3,101

Results are taken from the December 6, 1955 Toronto Star and might not exactly match final tallies.

== Suburbs ==
Etobicoke, East York, Mimico, and Forest Hill elected their councils for two-year terms in 1954 and did not hold elections in 1955.

=== Leaside ===
Mayor

Charles H. Hiscott – 2,228
Joseph Banigan – 1,073

Hiscott defeated Councillor Joseph Bannigan to replace retiring mayor Howard Burrell

Source: "Suburban elections", The Globe and Mail (1936–2016); Toronto, Ont. [Toronto, Ont] 06 Dec 1955: 13

=== Long Branch ===
Reeve

(incumbent) Marie Curtis (acclaimed)

=== New Toronto ===
Mayor

(incumbent) Donald R. Russell (acclaimed)

=== North York ===
Reeve

(incumbent) Fred J. McMahon – 16,269
Maurice T. Hook – 6,181

McMahon was re-elected, defeating his challenger Deputy Reeve Maurice T. Hook.

Source: "Fred McMahon Is Re-elected N. York Reeve", The Globe and Mail (1936–2016); Toronto, Ont. [Toronto, Ont] 06 Dec 1955: 13

=== Scarborough ===
Reeve

Gus Harris – 14,304
(incumbent) Oliver E. Crockford – 10,178

Deputy Reeve

Albert Campbell – 15,369
George Baker – 8,521

Harris defeated the incumbent, Oliver Crockford

Source: "Suburban elections", The Globe and Mail (1936–2016); Toronto, Ont. [Toronto, Ont] 06 Dec 1955: 13

=== Swansea ===
Reeve

- (incumbent) Dorothy Hague (acclaimed)

=== Weston ===
Mayor

- (incumbent) Harry Clark (acclaimed)

=== York ===
Reeve

(incumbent) Frederick W. Hall – 6,555
Walter Saunders – 6,256
Charles McMaster – 1,039
Norman Penner – 1,006

Source: "Few Brave Cold Rain To Vote in 3 Suburbs", Taylor, Ewart. The Globe and Mail (1936–2016); Toronto, Ont. [Toronto, Ont]05 Dec 1955: 1
