= Norman Penner =

Canadian politician (1921–2009)

- Born: February 21, 1921; Winnipeg, Manitoba, Canada
- Died: April 16, 2009 (aged 88); Toronto, Ontario, Canada
- Political party: Communist Party of Canada (1938–1957); Labor-Progressive Party of Canada
- Parent: Jacob Penner
- Relatives: Roland Penner (brother)

Academic background
- Education: University of Toronto

Academic work
- Discipline: Political science
- School or tradition: Socialism
- Institutions: York University
- Military career
- Branch: Canadian Army
- Service years: 1941–1947
- Unit: Royal Canadian Corps of Signals
- Conflicts: Second World War

Norman Penner (February 21, 1921 – April 16, 2009) was professor emeritus at York University, a writer and historian, a war veteran, and a former activist in the Communist Party of Canada and the Labor-Progressive Party who broke with the party as a result of the events of 1956.

== Biography ==
Penner was the son of Jacob Penner, a leading member of the Communist Party and popular Winnipeg alderman. He graduated from high school in 1937 and then worked from 1938 to 1941 as the full-time officer for the Winnipeg branch of the Communist Party.

He enlisted in the Canadian Army in 1941 and served overseas during World War II as a signalman. When he returned home in 1947, he became an organizer in Toronto for the Labor-Progressive Party as the Communist Party was then known. He ran in the 1951 Ontario election in York South and the 1953 federal election in York South finishing with 877 and 755 votes respectively. He also ran for reeve of York Township in the 1954 and 1955 municipal elections, coming in third and fourth place, respectively.

He broke with the party in 1957 as a result of the Soviet invasion of Hungary and Nikita Khrushchev's Secret Speech the previous year, events which caused the disillusionment of many party members.

After leaving the party he worked for several years as a salesman in the electrical heating business. In 1964, he decided to go back to school part-time and enrolled in political science at the University of Toronto at the age of 41 going on to earn a BA, MA, and PhD.

Penner was hired as a lecturer at York University's Glendon College in 1972 and soon became a professor and head of the political science department, continuing to teach until 1995.

He has written extensively on the Canadian left. Penner, discovered the long forgotten manuscript, then edited and introduced Winnipeg 1919: The Strikers' Own History of the Winnipeg General Strike in 1973, published The Canadian Left: A Critical Analysis in 1977 and contributed three chapters to as well as editing Keeping Canada Together Means Changing Our Thinking in 1978. He published Canadian Communism: The Stalin Years and Beyond in 1988 and From Protest to Power: Social Democracy in Canada 1900 to Present in 1992 as well as numerous articles, reviews and book chapters.

His brother, Roland Penner, was also a Communist activist in his youth and later served as Attorney-General of Manitoba.

== Electoral record ==
1955 Toronto municipal election: York
Council candidate	Vote	%
Frederick W. Hall	6,555	44.12
Walter Saunders	6,256	42.11
Charles McMaster	1,039	6.99
Norman Penner	1,006	6.77

1954 Toronto municipal election: York
Council candidate	Vote	%
Frederick W. Hall	10,724	68.63
Charles McMaster	3,178	20.34
Norman Penner	1,723	11.03

1953 Canadian federal election: York South
Party	Candidate	Votes
Co-operative Commonwealth	Joseph W. Noseworthy	12,216
Liberal	Alfred Green	10,820
Progressive Conservative	Alan Cockeram	10,116
Labor–Progressive	Norman Penner	755

1951 Ontario general election: York South
Party	Candidate	Votes	Vote %
Progressive Conservative	William Beech	13,756	39.7
Co-operative Commonwealth	E.B. Jolliffe	13,140	37.9
Liberal	Robert Colucci	6,855	19.8
Labor–Progressive	Norman Penner	877	2.5
	Total	34,628	
