= Arthur J. Brown =

Arthur J. Brown (born 1901, date of death unknown) was a Canadian politician and insurance underwriter in Toronto.

== Career ==
After serving as a school trustee and ultimately chairman of the Toronto Board of Education, he subsequently ran twice for Mayor of Toronto in 1953 and 1954, once for the Toronto Board of Control, and once for alderman for Ward 2, all unsuccessfully.

In the 1953 Toronto municipal election Brown ran on a platform promising to introduce rent control and came within 10,000 votes of defeating Allan Lamport for mayor.

Brown ran again for mayor in the 1954 Toronto municipal election, this time against Leslie Saunders, who had been appointed mayor earlier in the year after Lamport resigned, and long-time alderman Nathan Phillips. Brown stirred controversy when he made an accousation that suite 1735 of the Royal York hotel was secretly being rented by the city to entertain guests for the mayor and was being used by a clique of powerful interests would be able to lobby and influence city politics. Saunders claimed that the suite had been rented by Lamport when he was mayor and that he had been unaware of it, but it hurt his campaign. Saunders lost the election to Phillips, with Brown coming in third. In his memoirs, Saunders accused Brown of "splitting the Christian and Gentile vote", allowing Phillips to become Toronto's first Jewish mayor. Brown ran for Toronto Board of Control the next year, in the 1955 Toronto municipal election, but came 5,000 votes of winning the final spot on the board, which went to Saunders. His last attempt for office was in 1962 when he ran to be an alderman for Ward 2, again unsuccessfully.
