= Rupert E. Edwards =

Canadian businessman

Rupert E. Edwards (1894–1967) was a Canadian businessman, and the founder of Canada Varnish Ltd.

== Canada Varnish ==
Edwards immigrated to Canada as a teenager, eventually settling in Toronto and founding a small paint factory in 1923. Canada Varnish Ltd manufactured paints in Leaside, Toronto. Canada Vanish grew to be one of the largest employers in the city. Alexander MacNevin became a partner in the company in 1927. Edwards stayed as manager of the company until August 1950, when he started a new company, Certified Paints Ltd. Canada Varnish was sold in February 1953 to businessman Nelson Morgan Davis for $375,000.

The company no longer operates, but its former site is now called "Canvarco Rd", located in the Leaside area.

=== Carillon controversy ===
The Varnish factory was home to weekly organ recitals. In 1958, Edwards installed a carillon at the Canada Varnish factory in Leaside, which rang every 15 minutes from 8 a.m. to 6 p.m. The musical instrument was said to cost $66,000 – equivalent to over $600,000 today. Members of the community filed anti-noise complaints. Edwards argued that the musical performance should not be subject to the city's noise bylaws. He lost the case in court.

== Edwards Gardens ==
In 1944 Edwards purchased a large piece of land in North York, and converted it into a garden and golf course. In 1955 he sold the property to the Municipality of Metro Toronto at below-market rate, for $160,000 in order for the land to continue as a public park. The negotiation for the sale, was credited to councilor Roy E. Belyea. It became Edwards Gardens in 1956.

Toronto Botanical Garden (formerly Civic Garden Centre) relocated into the Milne home on the site in 1959.

== Edwards Charitable Foundation ==
On his death he founded the Edwards Charitable Foundation, which donated more than $5 million to the University of Toronto and continues to operate in Nova Scotia.
