= Nelson Morgan Davis =

Canadian businessman

- Born: Cleveland, Ohio
- Education: Cornell University
- Occupations: Transportation and banking magnate

Nelson Morgan Davis was a Canadian businessman. He owned a conglomerate of more than 50 transportation and manufacturing companies, and was one of Canada's richest people.

He served as director of the Canadian Bank of Commerce, the Crown Trust Company, the Argus Corporation and the Canadian Imperial Bank of Commerce.

== Early life ==
He was born in Cleveland, Ohio, to father Ernest H. Davis. He went to Cornell University and was a member of Sigma Chi. He married Eloise White on September 6, 1930, in New Rochelle, New York. He later lived on Toronto's Riverside Drive, and in Phoenix, Arizona.

In 1950, he created an exclusive golf course in Box Grove, Ontario. In 1967, he sold it to IBM for an estimated $2 million.

In September 1969, his niece was kidnapped, and Davis paid $200,000 for her return.

Through his company, NM Davis Corp, he purchased many businesses, including Rupert E. Edwards' Canada Varnish, in February 1953. His brother, Marsh Davis, ran one of his purchased trucking companies.

== Properties ==
A 1968 directory lists some of his properties as follows:

- CanVar Industries Ltd
- Admiral Acceptance Ltd
- Arrow Leasing Ltd
- Automobile Transport Ltd
- Brennan Paving Co
- Carwil Transport Ltd
- Central Chevrolet Toronto
- Inter-city Truck Lines
- The Markham Sand and Gravel Ltd
- Miller Paving
- North York Chevrolet
- Parkwood Motors
- Trans-Canada Highway Express Ltd
- Atlantic Distributing
- Dayton Rubber
- Great Lakes Supply
- Industrial Tankers Ltd
- Orange Crush Bottlers

== Estate ==
When Nelson Davis died in 1979 he left his estate worth tens of millions of dollars to his son, Glen Davis. Glen donated to numerous conservation and philanthropic organizations until he was murdered, on May 18, 2007. Davis was gunned down in the underground parking lot of an office building at Mt. Pleasant and Eglinton in Toronto. The "hit" was ordered and paid for by Davis's cousin, Marshall Ross, who believed that he would be named as a beneficiary in Davis's will; the funds received would be used to pay off Ross's massive debts, and protect his vaunted lifestyle. Shortly after the murder, Davis's company sued Ross for repayment of an earlier loan. The court decided in the company's favour, but no money has been repaid. Marshall Ross remains in federal prison, sentenced to life after pleading guilty to masterminding Davis's murder.
