= Toronto Botanical Garden =

Public park in Toronto, Ontario, Canada

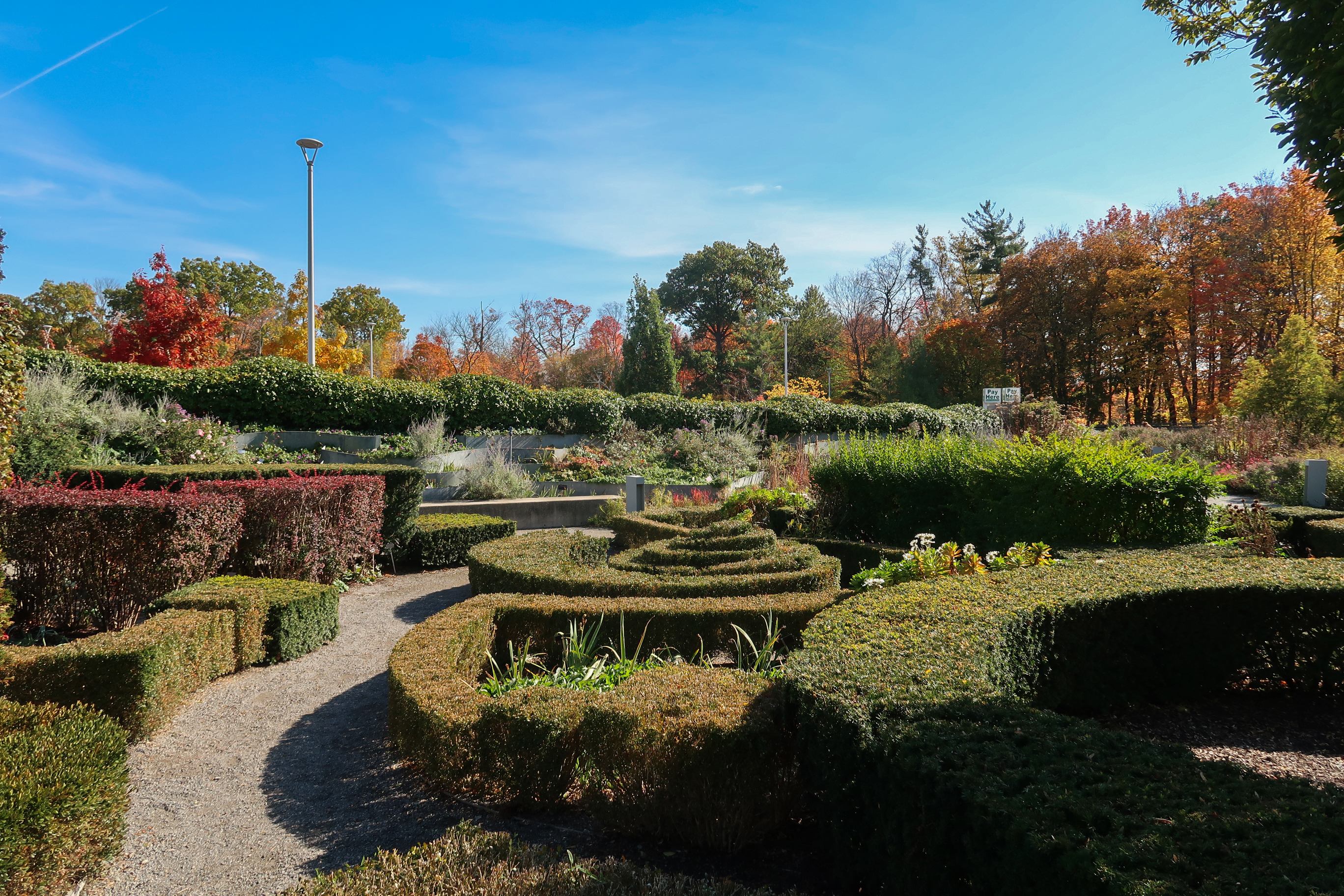

- Location within Toronto Location within Canada
- Type: Non-profit, public
- Location: 777 Lawrence Avenue East, Toronto, Ontario, Canada
- Coordinates: 43°44′03″N 79°21′30″W
- Area: 4 acres (2 ha)
- Opened: 1958
- Open: 7 days a week, sunrise to sunset
- Building hours: 9am to 5pm daily
- Website: Official website

The Toronto Botanical Garden (TBG) is located at 777 Lawrence Avenue East at Leslie Street, in Toronto, Ontario, Canada. Termed "The little garden with big ideas", the TBG is nearly four acres and features 17 themed "city-sized gardens". Located in the north-east corner of Edwards Gardens, the TBG is a non-profit horticultural and educational organization with a mission to connect people, plants and the natural world through education, inspiration and leadership.

== History ==
Formerly known as the Toronto Civic Garden Centre founded in 1958 by the Garden Club of Toronto, the TBG opened formally with the designation of a botanical garden in 2003.

Raymond Moriyama designed the Civic Garden Centre's main building that opened in 1965.

== Funding ==
Unlike many other large botanical gardens in North America, the TBG does not receive funding from the provincial or federal governments, and it produces over 95% of its operating budget from self-generated income through membership fees, fundraising events, course revenues, and from the generosity of individual and corporate donors.

== The gardens ==
Approximately four acres make up the 17 themed gardens of the Toronto Botanical Garden. The newest, and largest, addition is the Woodland Walk made up of native trees, shrubs, perennials, and a wildflower meadow, representing the Carolinian forest and prairie savannah native to this region of Toronto. Next is the Entry Garden Walk, sponsored by the Garden Club of Toronto and designed by Dutch garden designer Piet Oudolf. This garden is made up of perennials & ornamental grasses which have self-sown to create the sophisticated meadow that greets visitors. A water curtain and water channel are two key features complementing the Arrival Courtyard and West View Terrace, respectively. The building has two green roofs, one flat space planted with native perennials, the other slanted and planted with sedum varieties. Part of the TBG's Silver LEED Certification includes the collection of rainwater from the water features as well as the building, which is stored in two cisterns found in the perennial borders. Garden staff work from a straw bale shed also with a green roof of native perennials.

== Children's education ==
Since 1998, Toronto Botanical Garden has offered a variety of programs designed to stimulate children's curiosity about nature and gardening through hands-on experiences. Each year TBGKids educates over 6000 children through school visits, summer and March break camps, family programs, and outreach initiatives. Children learn in the beautiful and unique Teaching Garden which incorporates demonstration plots and an organic vegetable garden sown and harvested by children. The TBG donates produce from the Teaching Garden each year to the North York Harvest Food Bank.

== Weston Family Library ==
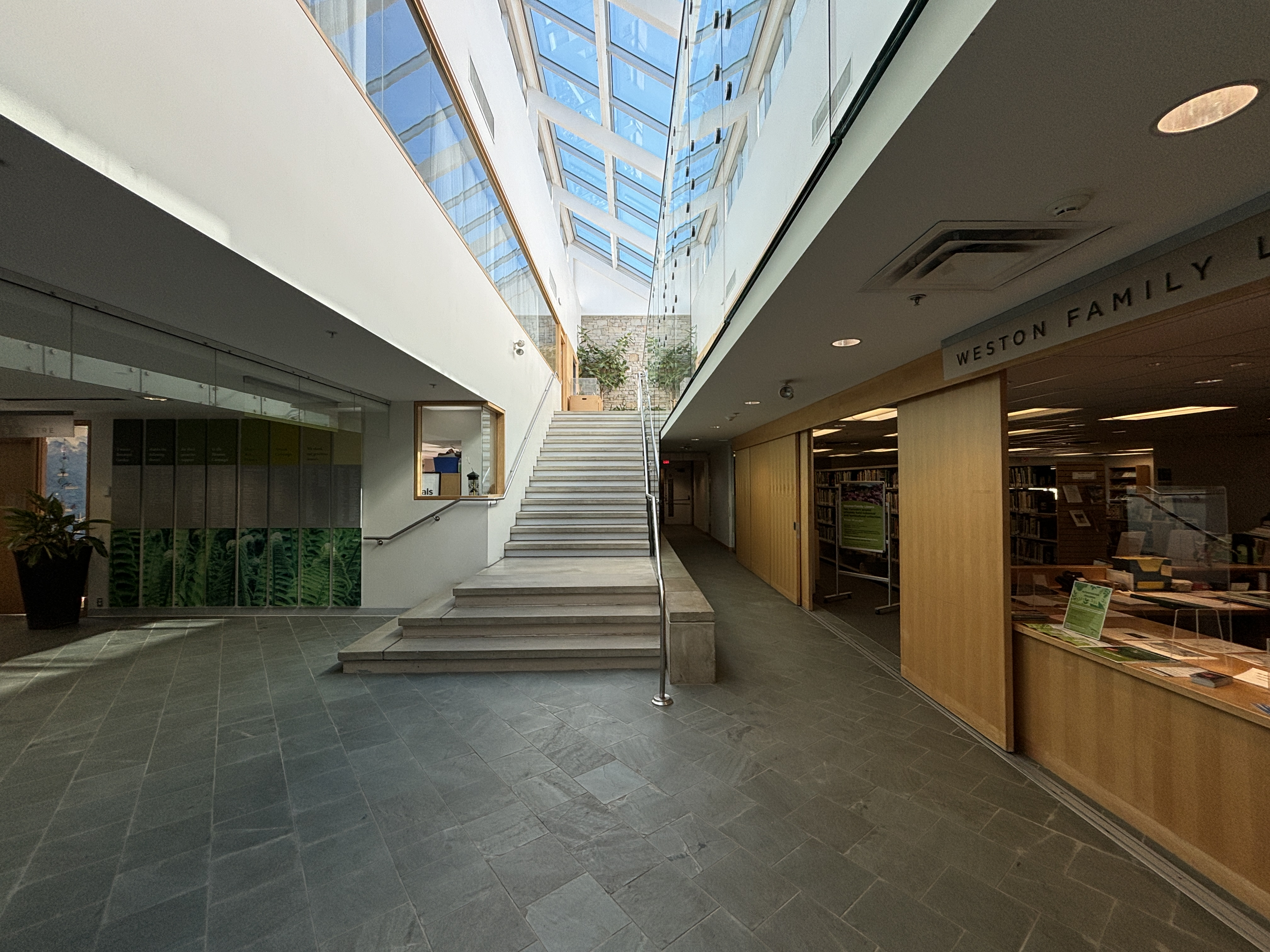
Weston Family Library inside Dembroski Building

The TBG's Weston Family Library is the largest private horticultural library in Canada. The library's resources surround themes of domestic horticulture, such as landscape design, flower arrangement, plant species, growing herbs and vegetables, urban agriculture, and many others. Collections include children's titles, reference materials, magazines and journals, DVDs, historical and rare books. Only members may borrow materials from the Weston Family Library, but the space is open to the public and anyone is allowed to browse and use materials within the library. The library offers courses and programming for adults and children, and features an art gallery with rotating exhibitions with horticultural themes.

== Adult education ==
Toronto Botanical Garden offers 20 courses a year for adults in botanically related disciplines such as gardening, urban vegetable gardening, container gardening, urban beekeeping, botanical art, floral design, nature, photography and wellness. Special events include the HortiCULTURE Salon Series, TBG Lecture Series, Royal York Rooftop Tour and Lunch, bus tours, and Grow, Cook and Relish Series. Classes offered include elements such as lecture-style instruction, discussions, and in many cases, hand-on elements. Course offerings vary each season, and are designed to provide TBG members and the public with seasonally appropriate information to help them in their own gardens, as well as fulfilling the mission of connecting people with plants and the natural world.

== See also ==
- Allan Gardens
- List of botanical gardens in Canada
- Royal Botanical Gardens (Ontario)
