= Ross Lipsett =

Canadian politician (1911–1995)

Ross Lipsett (1911 - January 15, 1995) was a municipal politician in Toronto in the 1950s.

== Career ==
A lifelong resident of The Beaches, he served first as an alderman for Ward 8 (representing The Beaches), on Toronto City Council, and then on the Toronto Board of Control in 1954, when he was appointed by council to fill a vacancy on the board. However, when he ran in the December 1954 Toronto municipal election to retain his seat, he was defeated.

On July 7, 1954, he was appointed to the Board of Control, Toronto municipal government's executive body, to fill a vacancy created by Mayor Allan Lamport's resignation and Controller Leslie Saunders's appointment as interim mayor. In council's vote on filling the vacancy, Lipsett defeated alderman Allan Grossman and former alderman Joseph Cornish on the first ballot. The appointment was controversial as Cornish had finished in fifth place in the previous municipal election, narrowly missing winning a seat on the four-member board by 4,600 votes in the city-wide election. In the December 1954 Toronto municipal election, Cornish again ran for the board and succeeded in winning the fourth position, beating Lipsett by 10,000 votes. As an alderman and controller, Lipsett favoured increased social assistance to the elderly and the construction of emergency housing as well as the construction of the Don Valley Parkway and the proposed Scarborough Expressway and also advocated the conversion of the Toronto Islands to parkland, opposing proposals to build a bridge or tunnel connecting the islands to the mainland.

Outside of politics, Lipsett owned Ross Lipsett Tires and Automotive Supplies Wholesalers in Leaside.
