= Edwards Gardens =

Botanical garden in Toronto, Ontario, Canada

Edwards Botanical Gardens
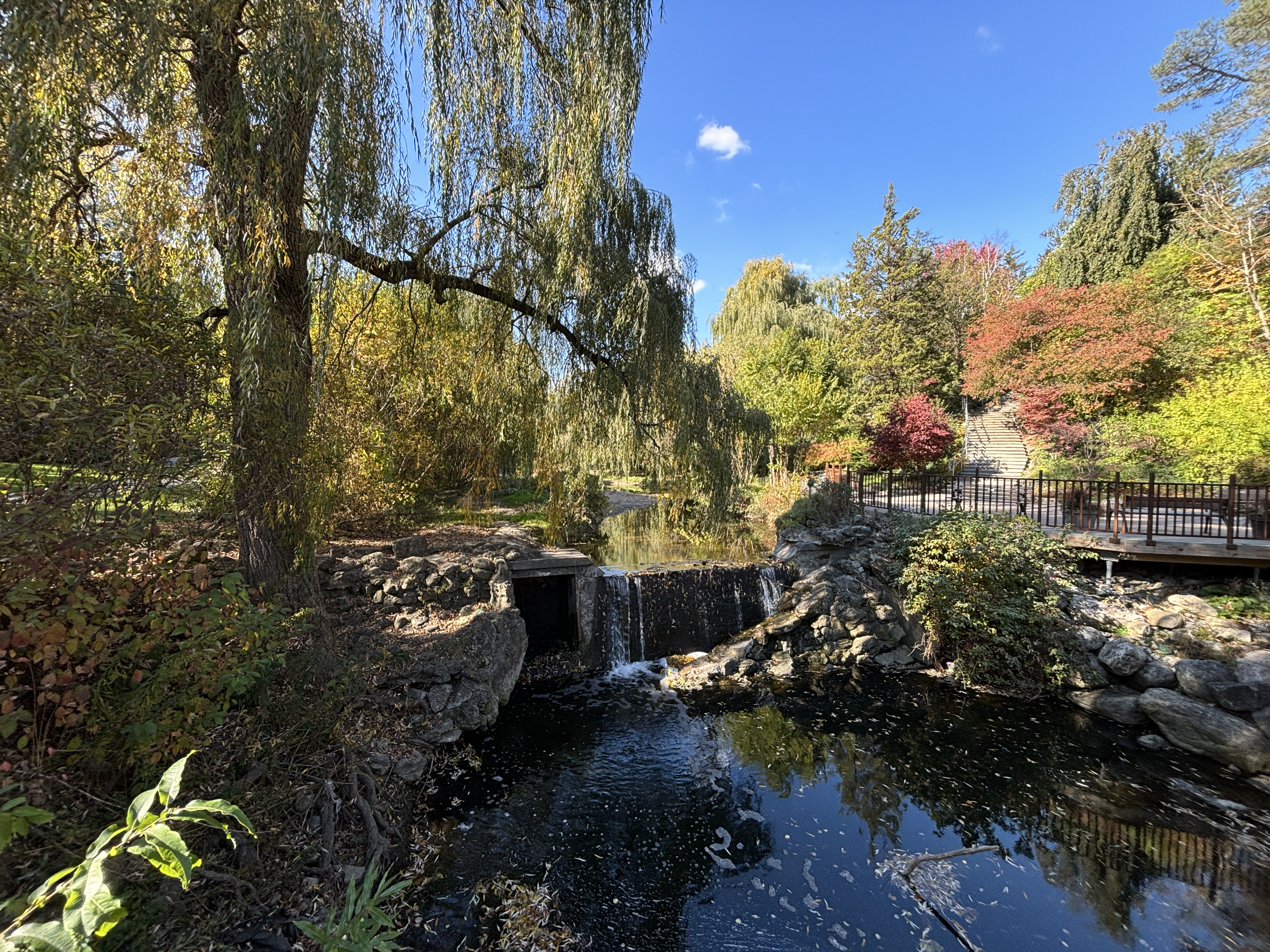
- The Edwards Gardens

- Location within Toronto
- Type: Public park, Botanical garden
- Location: Toronto, Ontario
- Coordinates: 43°44′02″N 79°21′34″W
- Created: 1956
- Operator: Toronto city council
- Website: Edwards Gardens Park

Edwards Gardens is a botanical garden located on the southwest corner of Leslie Street and Lawrence Avenue East in Toronto, Ontario, Canada. It is also the site of the Toronto Botanical Garden, a private not-for-profit organization previously called the Civic Garden Centre.

It is a former estate garden featuring annuals, roses and wildflowers and an extensive rockery. It is located on Wilket Creek, one of the tributaries of the Don River West Branch. The estate's title was once held by Alexander Milne, a Scottish weaver who settled there after the War of 1812 and left in 1832. Although the property remained in the Milne family, it was left in neglect. The land and the woollen/saw mills were bought by Rupert E. Edwards in 1944 and he created a magnificent garden there. He sold the property to the Municipality of Metro Toronto in 1955 to become a public park, and it became Edwards Gardens in 1956. Toronto Botanical Garden (formerly Civic Garden Centre) relocated into the Milne home on the site in 1959.

Edwards Gardens is one of several parks located along Toronto's ravines, many of which are connected by hiking and cycling trails, and connected to the shores of Lake Ontario. The park's manicured lawns and flower beds make it a popular destination for wedding parties to take photographs.

In 2013, Edwards Gardens won an Award of Excellence under the Regional Citation (New Directions) category from the Canadian Society of Landscape Architects for their sustainably designed parking lot.

Edwards Gardens, Toronto, 1959

== Gallery ==
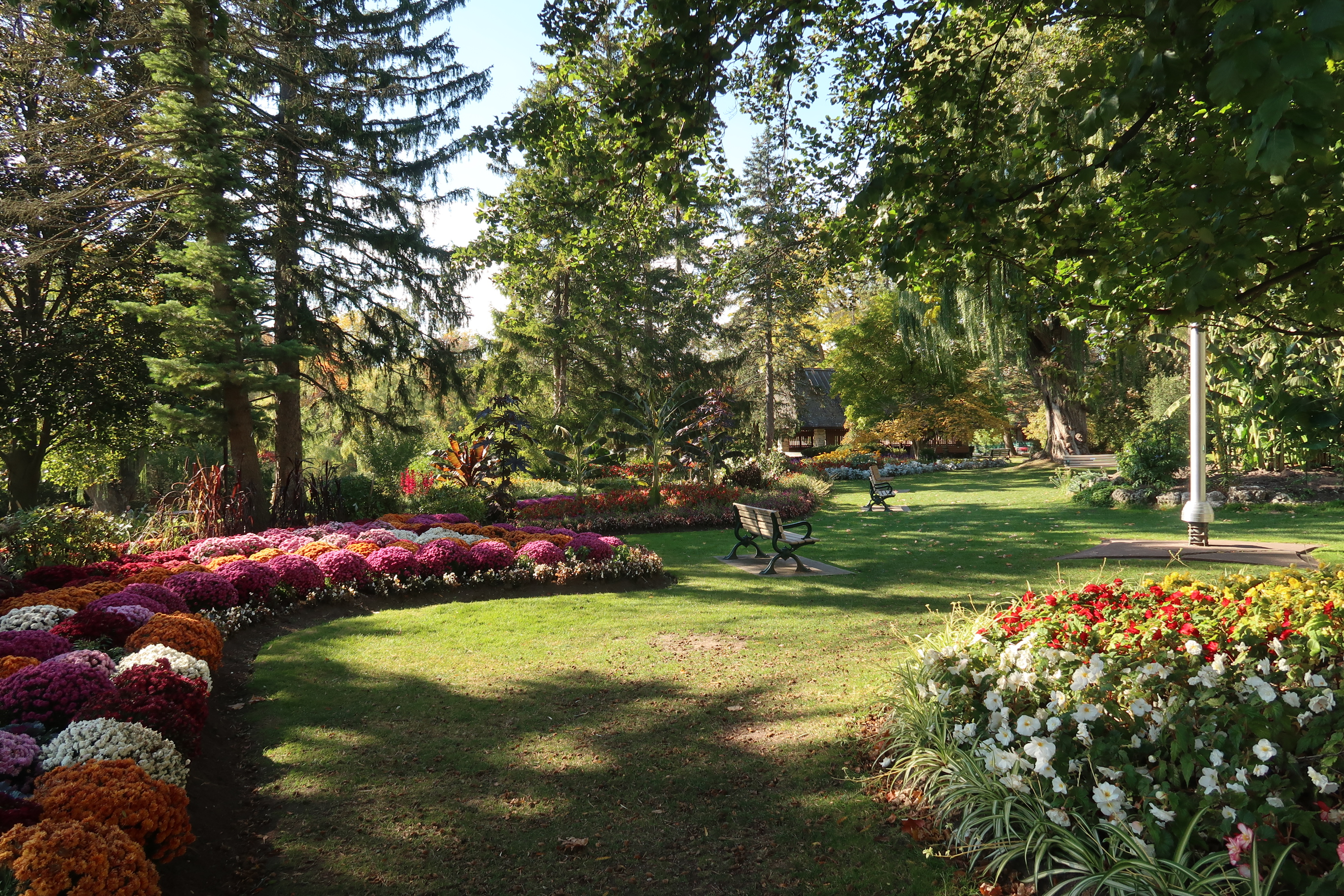
The Greensward

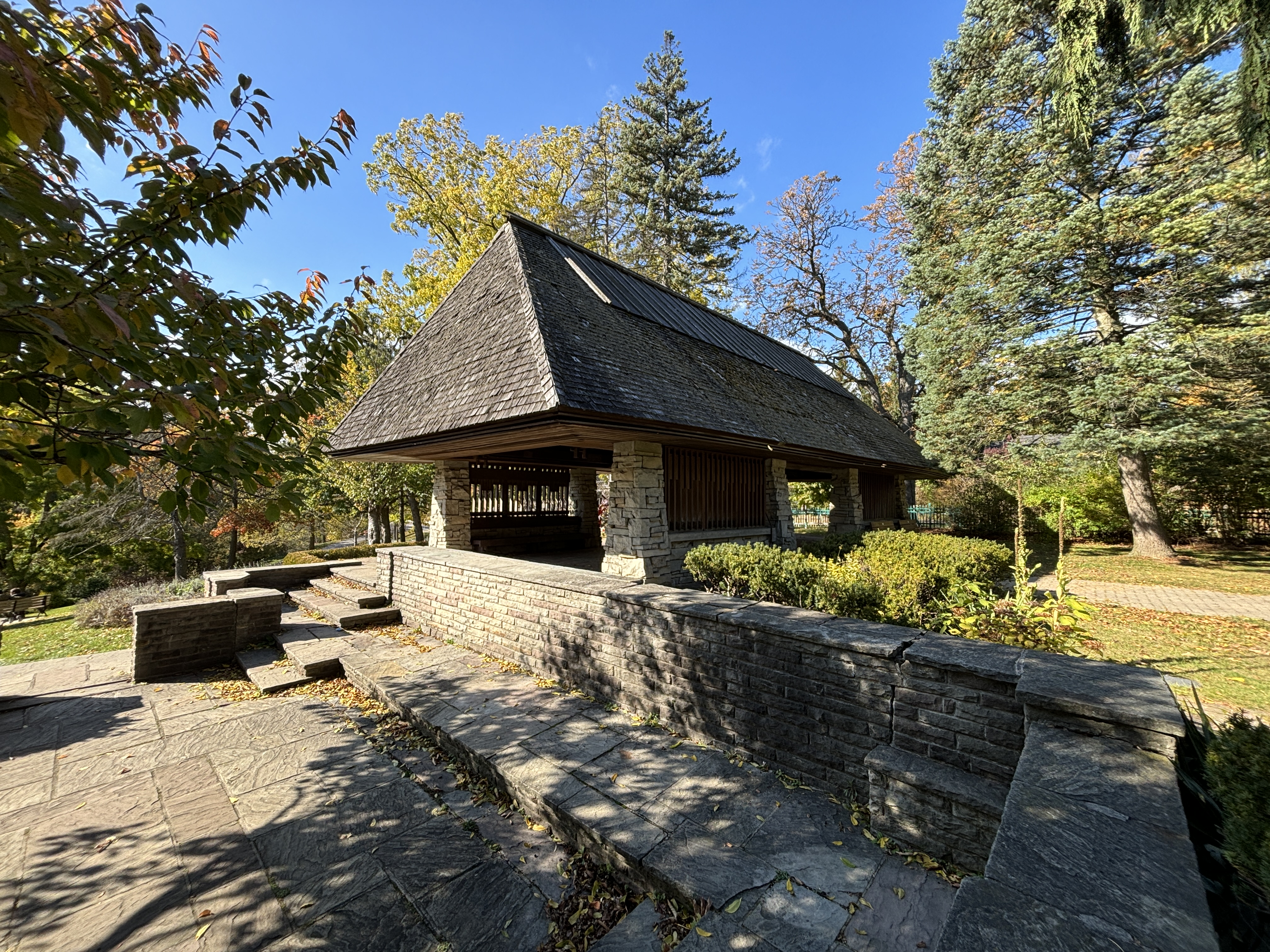
Moriyama Pavilion

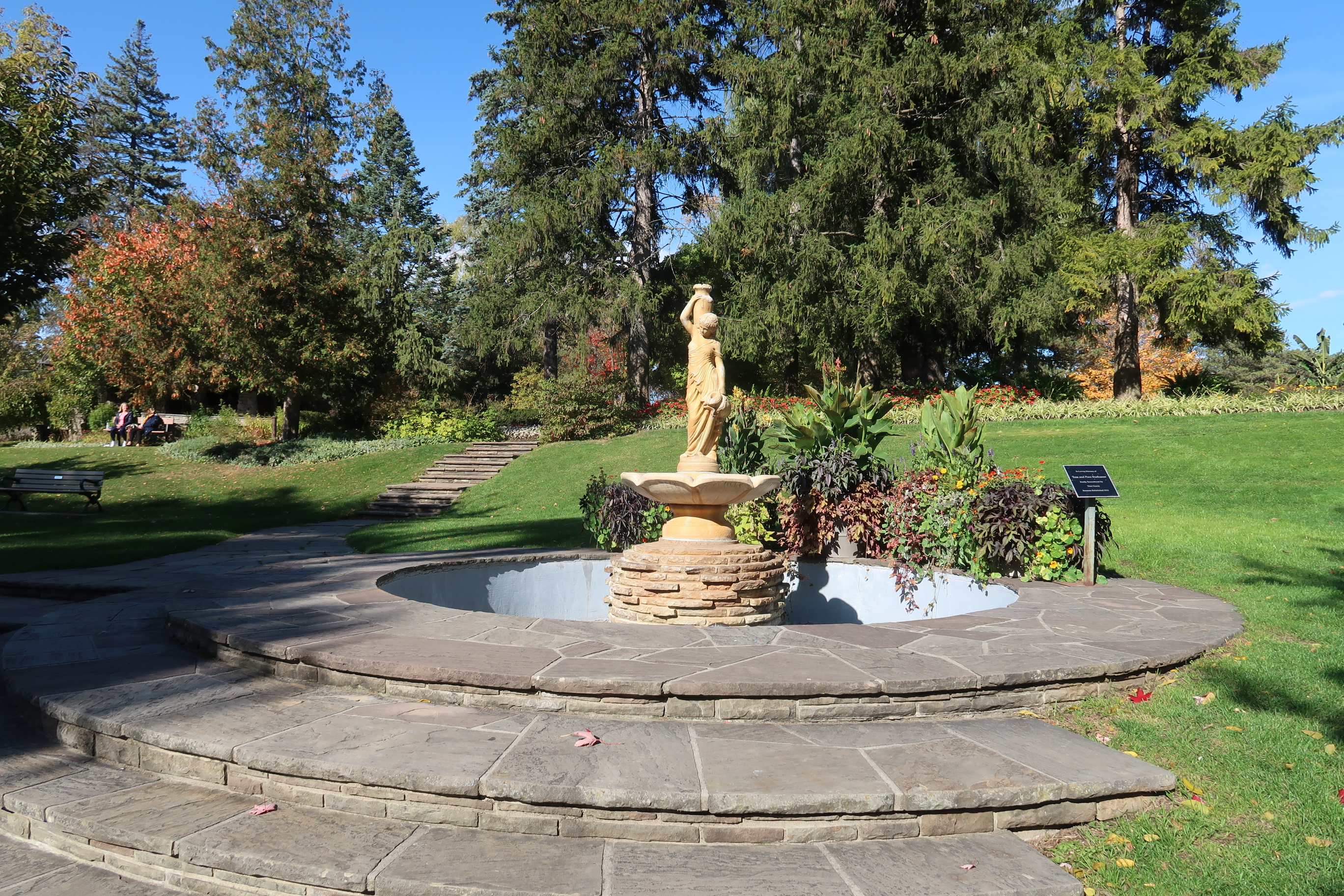
The Greensward Fountain

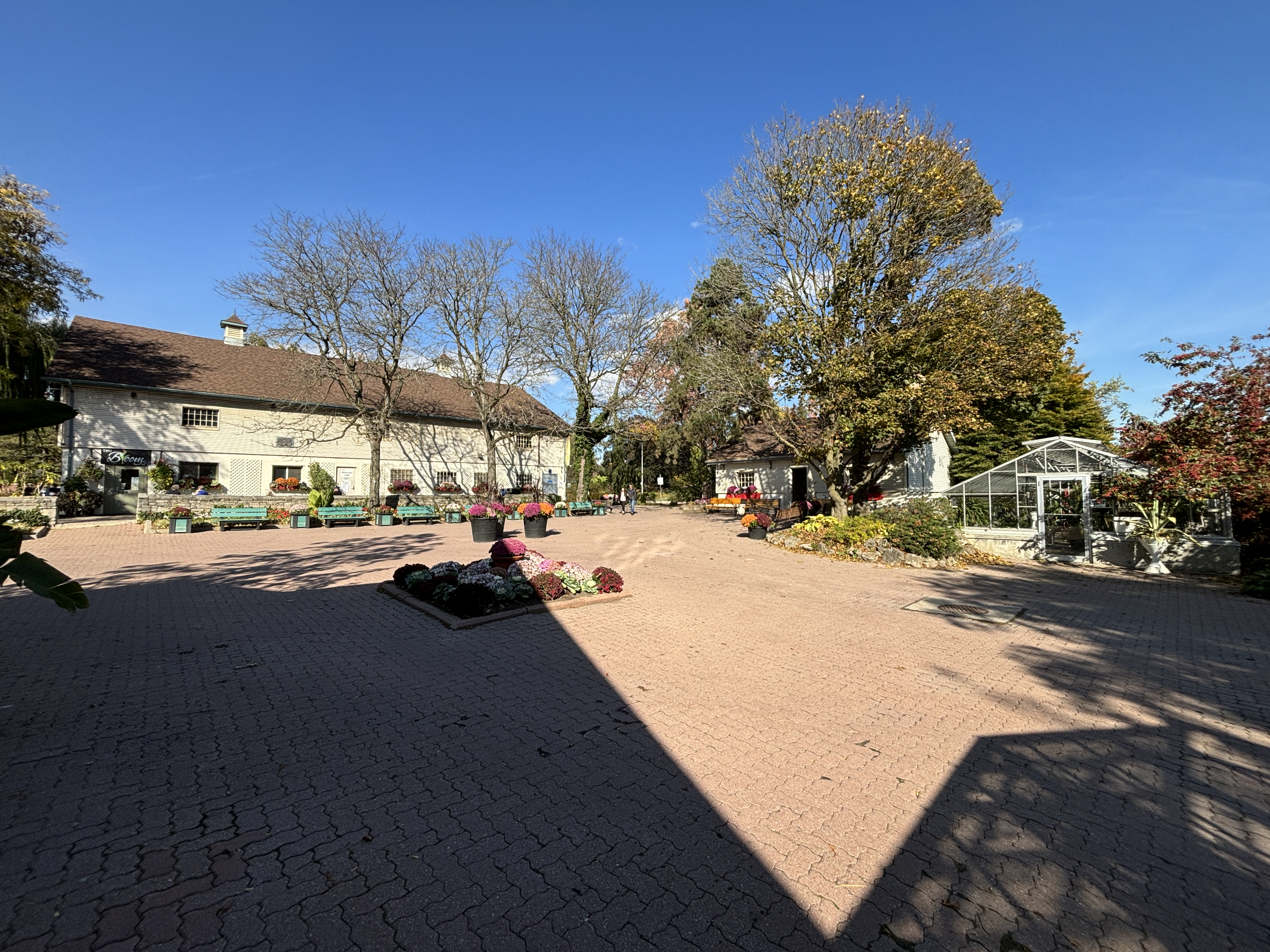
Edward Gardens Cafe and Garage

== See also ==
- List of botanical gardens in Canada
