= Frederick Joseph McMahon =

Canadian judge

7th Reeve of North York
- In office 1 January 1953 – 31 December 1955
- Preceded by: Nelson A. Boylen
- Succeeded by: Vernon Singer

Personal details
- Born: 1914 Toronto, Ontario
- Died: March 6, 1988 (aged 73) North York, Ontario
- Spouse: Ruth
- Children: 3
- Occupation: Lawyer, judge

Frederick Joseph McMahon (1914 — March 6, 1988) was a provincial court judge in Ontario who had previously been a lawyer and reeve of North York, Ontario from 1953 to 1955. As a lawyer, McMahon was well known for having defended bank robbers Edwin Alonzo Boyd and his brother Norman in their 1952 trials.

== Early life ==
McMahon grew up in Toronto, graduating from North Toronto Collegiate Institute. After graduating from Osgoode Hall Law School in 1943, he joined the Royal Canadian Navy for the duration of World War II. He moved to the township of North York, in 1945 and begun his law practice.

== Political career ==
After serving as a school trustee, he was elected to North York Township Council as deputy reeve for Ward 3 in the January 1950 municipal election, and then re-elected for a second term at the end of the year. He challenged incumbent reeve Nelson A. Boylen in the 1952 election and defeated him by more than 1,500 votes, running on a promise to attract industry to the municipality, and expand North York's five-member town council which had been the same size since 1923 despite the township's population having increased five-fold, in that period.

As reeve, McMahon supported the Ontario Municipal Board's recommendation that North York and the 11 other suburbs of the Old City of Toronto be federated with Toronto into a new municipality of Metropolitan Toronto rather than amalgamated into a unitary city. He later said the township had been close to bankruptcy and that joining Metropolitan Toronto had saved it from that fate.

In 1953, McMahon was acclaimed to a second term as reeve, and was subsequently re-elected in 1954 and 1955. He was a member of the Metropolitan Toronto Council's executive committee and supported Metro's by-law fluoridizing the water supply.

He was an active member of the Liberal Party and while reeve, was the Ontario Liberal Party's candidate in York Centre for the 1955 Ontario general election, but was defeated by 1,100 votes.

In September 1956, McMahon announced that he would not be running again for re-election in order to devote more time to his law practice.

In 1960, a group of ratepayers accused McMahon of having illicitly purchased public land while serving as deputy reeve nine years earlier, using a secretary in his law office as an intermediary and then purchasing it from her several weeks later for a nominal amount. Township officials stated that the township sold the land for a "fair price" and no laws were broken.

== Legal career ==
McMahon's most famous case was his defence of bank robber Edwin Alonzo Boyd, leader of the Boyd Gang, and his brother Norman.

While both brothers were convicted, he successfully had Norman Boyd's conviction overturned on appeal.

In 1963, McMahon left private practice to become general counsel for the North York Hydro-Electric Commission.

He was appointed a provincial court judge in 1969 by Attorney-General of Ontario Arthur Wishart.
