= Roy E. Belyea =

Canadian politician and businessman (1894–1976)

- Born: 1894
- Died: December 12, 1976 (aged 81–82)
- Occupations: Politician and businessman
- Known for: 1955 Toronto municipal election

Roy E. Belyea (1894 – December 12, 1976) was a political and business figure in Toronto and a long-time member of Toronto City Council and member of council's executive, the Toronto Board of Control. He unsuccessfully challenged sitting Mayor of Toronto, Nathan Phillips in the 1955 Toronto municipal election.

Belyea was a descendant of United Empire Loyalists. His father, Issac K. Belyea, was an engineer for the Grand Trunk Railway.

== Business career ==
A plumber by trade, he and his brother founded Belyea Brothers with a brother in 1908. The company was awarded the first plumbing and heating license given by the City of Toronto.

The brothers built the company into what was the largest plumbing and heating company in Canada at the time of his death. The company, now called Belyea Bros. Heating, Cooling & Electrical, is still in business as of 2022 as an HVAC company.

In the 1920s and 1930s, he was president of the Amalgamated Builders' Council. Belyea was charged for price fixing and other illegal acts under the Combines Investigation Act. Belyea and Harry Weinraub were initially acquitted, but then convicted on appeal to the Supreme Court of Ontario. Their conviction was upheld by the Supreme Court of Canada and a fine of $4,000 each or four months of jail was also upheld.

== Political career ==
Belyea went into politics in 1949 when he decided to run for city council after failing to get the city to fix a plumbing issue. He was elected as the junior alderman for Ward 9, representing North Toronto. In December 1951, he became the senior alderman for the ward. In 1954, he was appointed by the city council to the Board of Control, the powerful executive committee of the city, after the death of Controller Louis Shannon.

Belyea won a seat on the board in his own right in the 1954 Toronto municipal election, being elected second of four Controllers in the at-large election. As a senior alderman, and then senior controller, he also had a seat on Metropolitan Toronto Council, when that body was formed in January 1954.

His two main interests as a city official were parks and public works. He had the city begin a winter works program, and convinced Metropolitan Toronto to buy land owned by Rupert Edwards and make it a public park instead of developing it. Edwards agreed to sell the property to Metro for $157,000 - a third of what a developer had offered for the land, on the condition that the park, which became Edwards Gardens, be named after him.

=== Noronic disaster ===
Belyea was chair of the parks committee during the SS Noronic disaster of 1949. The Noronic was a passenger ship that docked for the night at Pier 9 in Toronto Harbour on September 16 when a fire broke out, resulting in the loss of at least 118 lives. Belyea responded to the fire by turning a building at Exhibition Place into a morgue in order to accommodate the 118 fatalities and arranged food and accommodation for the survivors of the disaster.

== Running for mayor ==
He ran for mayor in the 1955 election in an attempt to unseat his rival, incumbent mayor Nathan Phillips. Belyea ran on a platform of parks improvement and accused Phillips of having "frustrated my every effort to bring about reforms in city management." He also accused Phillips of breaking a promise to serve only one term as mayor, a pledge Phillips denied making. During the campaign, Belyea called on the city to adopt an official master plan, limiting the construction of tall buildings south of Bloor Street (the city would go on to adopt a 45-foot limit in the 1970s, while David Crombie was mayor). He also said that as a businessman, he would be better able to stop taxes from going up, supported building expressways as well as saving parkland, urban planning, the building of an east-west subway system, the installation of escalators in every subway station to help the elderly and disabled, the construction of apartments for senior citizens, and the construction of a new city hall.

Belyea was unsuccessful receiving only 26,717 votes to Phillips's 70,647 votes. He attempted a comeback in 1958, running for a seat on the four-member Board of Control, but came in sixth.
