= Ross Parry Agency =

British new agency

Ross Parry Agency is a national and international news agency based in Yorkshire, England. The company is owned by South West News Service.

== History ==
Ross Parry Agency started life as an independent news agency based in Leeds, West Yorkshire, which was founded in 1981 by partners Jeff Ross and Dave Parry. It turned into an agency with great "calibre and reputation" in providing the national press with news stories and pictures.

In 2013, Ross Parry Agency was acquired by SWNS along with Masons News in Cambridge. Parry chose to stay on as picture editor and as part of the takeover bid the news agency would keep its original name. Parry said the union with SWNS "would take Ross Parry to a new level, providing an even better service from our region." After Dave Parry retired a year later, Glen Minikin took over the reins as picture editor. In Summer 2017, Charlotte Owen became news editor after taking over from Rebecca Penston.

In late 2017, SWNS announced that Ross Parry Agency would be part of their new dawn of content creation, which would "revolutionise" the industry. The company won a six-figure Google grant to help the content making process.

In 2018, Ross Parry Agency's chief reporter Tom Kershaw, along with two other journalists, overturned an order to name a police officer after he was struck off for not reviewing CCTV footage correctly.
