= Ford Brand =

Canadian politician, Toronto (1904–1986)

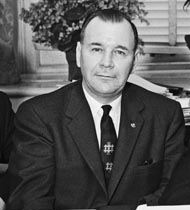
Brand in 1956

Ford Brand (1904 – July 29, 1986) was a Canadian politician who was a one-time rival to Toronto mayor Nathan Phillips. Ford had a seat on the Toronto Board of Control, the municipality's executive body, from 1951 to 1958 and also an inaugural member of the Metropolitan Toronto Council from the 1954 election until 1958. In the 1958 Toronto municipal election he challenged incumbent mayor Nathan Phillips, but lost by 20,000 votes. He then served two five-year terms as a member of the Toronto Transit Commission's board before retiring in 1970.

== Career ==
He was a pressman by trade, working for Garden City Press in the 1930s, and specializing in colour covers. A trade unionist, he was president of the Toronto Labour Council in the 1940s, and then the labour council's secretary when he was elected to the Board of Control in 1951, after having been unsuccessful the year before. Unusually, he was able to win a seat on the powerful Board of Control despite never having been an alderman or held any other elected office, winning the second position on the four member board.

As a Metro councillor, he persuaded Metropolitan Toronto to build 2,000 units of public housing in the Old City of Toronto, rather than in the suburbs, arguing that public housing should be built where the need was greatest. After previously being a trusted ally of Phillips, Brand spontaneously decided to run against him at a March 1958 Metro Council meeting in which Phillips attempted to delay the construction of the housing, prompting Brand to tell Phillips in a speech at Metro Council that "I'm sick and tired of you coming over here and picking my brains and then using it against me," going on to announce his candidacy for mayor out of frustration with Phillips. After a testy campaign, Brand received 30,000 votes, behind Phillips's 53,000 votes. In his concession speech, Brand announced "I think this is the end of the road for me in politics. I won't have time because I'll be busy rehabilitating myself in the printing trade," he joked. "It's evident that labor didn't come out and vote for me," he added. Out of office, Brand turned down an offer of a position as a labour conciliator and instead entered the life insurance business.

Brand was a supporter of the Co-operative Commonwealth Federation (the precursor or the New Democratic Party) and organised the party's riding association in Parkdale (federal electoral district). He placed second in provincial Parkdale riding in the 1943 provincial election running for the Ontario CCF and third in the federal riding in the 1945 Canadian federal election.

== Assessment ==
He was described by the Toronto Star as "one of Toronto's toughest politicians" and an advocate for the poor. In a 1970 editorial, the Toronto Star described Brand as having been "mayor in all but name" behind the scenes, while the cheerier and more sociable Mayor Phillips was performing the ceremonial duties of the job.

He was described by the Star in a 1960 editorial as "always labour's intelligent spokesman, never its puppet" – one reason he lost the 1958 election was because trade unionists turned against him after he supported declaring some municipal services "essential services" in which workers did not have the right to strike.
