= Harry Simpson (politician) =

Canadian politician

Henry George (Harry) Simpson (1886-1967) was a municipal politician in East York, Ontario, in Metropolitan Toronto. A retired bank manager, he served as Reeve of East York for seven years, and was a founding member of Metropolitan Toronto Council.

Simpson was first elected to East York township council in 1945 and served a year as deputy reeve. A supporter of the Conservative Party, he was first elected reeve in 1950 and remained in office until 1956 when he chose to run as an ordinary township councillor rather than for re-election as reeve. He attempted to return to the reeveship in 1958, running on a conservationist platform of protecting the township's parkland and green belt from commercial development, and against pro-development incumbent reeve Jack Allen's proposal for extending Cosburn Avenue through Taylor-Massey Creek parkland in the Don River valley. Simspon opposed Allen's proposal for the road extension, which was to be accompanied by apartment developments, saying "we're losing parkland at a terrific rate and we can't afford any more", adding that his "fear is that the apartment buildings will degenerate into tenements within 10 years or so." Simpson was defeated by Allen in the election by 600 votes. In the 1960s, Simpson served as East York's hydro commissioner.

Simpson died of cancer on July 31, 1967.
