= Marie Curtis =

Canadian politician

Reeve, Village of Long Branch
- In office 1953–1962
- Preceded by: Thomas Carter
- Succeeded by: Leonard Ford

Councillor, Metropolitan Toronto
- In office 1953–1962

Personal details
- Born: Ann Marie McCarthy; 1911 or 1912 Midland, Ontario, Canada
- Died: March 12, 2006 (aged 94) Markdale, Ontario, Canada
- Spouse: Bryce Curtis
- Children: Bill, Joan

Ann Marie Curtis (1911/12 – March 12, 2006), née McCarthy, was a Canadian politician, who served as the reeve of the Toronto suburb of Long Branch, Ontario from 1953 to her retirement in 1962. She was the first, and only, woman to become reeve of Long Branch. She and Dorothy Hague of the Village of Swansea were the first women to become reeves or mayors in the Toronto area, both taking office for the first time on January 1, 1953. As reeve, she also served on Metropolitan Toronto Council (Metro Toronto Council) from its creation in 1953 until 1962 and was the first woman on its executive.

== Background ==
Born Ann Marie McCarthy in Midland, Ontario, Canada in 1912, she was one of seven children. She was raised in the United States in St. Louis, Missouri by an aunt. Curtis moved back to Canada and worked in a hat factory in Toronto. She married Bryce Curtis in 1933 and the couple settled in the village of Long Branch, then outside of Toronto, in 1935 because the rents were too high in Toronto. A self-described housewife, whose "political commentary was as crusty as the scrumptious apple pies she loved to bake", Curtis did not go to high school or college, but did take university extension courses.

The firing of seven teachers in her community prompted Curtis to become involved in activism and public service. Curtis became president of the Home and School Association and successfully lobbied for kindergarten classes to be brought to the community. Curtis started attending Long Branch Council meetings. In 1950, on learning that the deputy reeve of Long Branch was about to be acclaimed, she decided to run against him and won, becoming the first woman elected to Long Branch's village council. "I thought that was awful. Why he hadn't done anything but rubber-stamp the rest of the council all the time I was watching. So I went out to try and find someone to fight that drone."

== Political career ==
Curtis was elected reeve of Long Branch in the 1952 municipal election, defeating incumbent reeve Thomas Carter by 150 votes in an upset victory. Curtis became the first female reeve of Long Branch and was welcomed with a corsage of orchids at the first meeting. As reeve, she oversaw improvements to infrastructure such as the installation of storm sewers on every street, the paving of roads, and the planting of crab apple trees alongside them. In December 1962, Curtis opened the Long Branch Arena, a new artificial ice rink in Long Branch. A plebiscite of taxpayers had turned down using taxpayer funds, and Curtis formed a citizen's committee instead and was able to fund-raise $97,000 of the $100,000 cost within two years, getting the Ontario government to chip in $10,000 to put it over the top.

In October 1954, Hurricane Hazel caused Etobicoke Creek to flood Island Road and 43rd Street and a trailer park in Long Branch, washing trailers and homes into Lake Ontario, killing seven people. 700 people were evacuated from the trailer park and streets. Curtis oversaw the relocation of flood victims and advocated for the conversion of a flood plain on which the devastated homes stood into parkland, for which she was able to get the support of Metro chairman Fred Gardiner. A CA$1.6 million ($18.6 million in 2025 dollars) plan to demolish 300 homes, the trailer park and create a 35 acres (14 ha) park was developed. Curtis delivered compensation checks personally to the flood victims.

As reeve, Curtis became a member of York County Council also, which opposed the Cumming Report to create Metropolitan Toronto, which grouped Toronto and its surrounding suburbs into a two-tier government The Government of Ontario over-rode the suburban concerns and Metropolitan Toronto came into being in 1954, while Metro Toronto Council came into being first, on April 15, 1953 and Curtis became a member of the first Metro Toronto Council.

At Metro, Curtis was a critic of the Toronto Transit Commission (TTC). She was an opponent of the two-zone fare plan put in place by Metro and the TTC, causing persons in Long Branch to pay two fares to get downtown, while service was poor. Curtis and other suburban politicians organized protests and community meetings, but were unsuccessful in stopping its implementation, although they were able to block the TTC's suburban representative from reappointment. Curtis arranged for Allan Lamport, TTC commissioner and William Russell, chairman of the TTC, to ride from Long Branch to downtown and back, to impress upon them the slow service. They compared times with Curtis' times recorded the week before by Long Branch residents. The trips took 20 minutes less than usual, and Curtis claimed that the TTC had arranged a "smart fix", having extra streetcars and inspectors around during the test, a claim the TTC denied. In 1962, Curtis claimed that the TTC was concealing a report that a one-zone policy would cut its annual deficit by half. The two-zone policy was phased out in 1973. Streetcars still travel along Lake Shore Boulevard to Long Branch Loop. GO Transit service direct to downtown was inaugurated in the 1960s and it included a Long Branch station.

Curtis was the first woman to sit on Metro Toronto Council's executive committee but lost her place on the body after leading a fight up to the Supreme Court of Canada against a tax to help pay for the construction of the TTC's Bloor-Danforth subway. A portion of the funds would come from TTC fares, but Curtis and others wanted the entire project to be funded from fares. She objected to a proposed $7 property tax increase to pay for the subway saying, "I am afraid these taxes will tie people up so tightly it will make them move out of here, the same as some of us moved from the city" and claiming that the subway would be "of doubtful benefit to our municipality." Long Branch, Mimico, New Toronto, Etobicoke and Scarborough all objected and opposed the proposal at the Ontario Municipal Board in August 1958, followed by an appeal to the Ontario Court of Appeal in October 1958. After failing in both cases, Etobicoke and Scarborough dropped out, leaving the Lakeshore municipalities to continue. A week after filing her appeal to the Supreme Court, Curtis was voted off of the Metro executive by Metro Toronto Council and replaced by a pro-subway councillor. The Supreme Court of Canada sided with Metro Toronto on the case and denied an appeal. In 1962, Curtis opposed Metro Toronto providing an annual subsidy to the TTC.

== Retirement ==
Curtis retired from politics in 1962. According to Curtis, two major reasons for her to get into politics had been resolved: storm sewers and paved roads in Long Branch. The lack of sewers had caused her garden to flood after every storm. The lack of paved roads meant that Long Branch sprinkled tar yearly on dirt roads, leaving children to track the tar into the house. Curtis moved with her husband to a retirement home in Flesherton, Ontario. After leaving Long Branch she served for six years as secretary of the Association of Mayors and Reeves in Ontario. Curtis had served as its president in 1958. She also served as spokesperson and advisor to members of Grey County Council in the 1960s and 1970s.

Curtis advocated in 1962 for the amalgamation of Long Branch with neighbouring villages Mimico and New Toronto, on the basis that the three small communities had three votes on Metro Council, more votes than larger municipalities in Metro. The proposal eventually went to the Ontario Municipal Board, which left the villages in place. The Government of Ontario amalgamated the three communities into Etobicoke in 1967, and later Toronto.

Curtis died in 2006 at the age of 94 of an apparent stroke in the Grey Gables home in Markdale, Ontario. Curtis' husband died in 1998, and her son Bill in 1987. She was survived by her daughter Joan McGee, five grandchildren and ten great-grandchildren. Curtis was interred in Markdale Cemetery. The Curtis's modest bungalow at 10 31st street in Long Branch was demolished in 2018.

The 35-acre park created at the mouth of Etobicoke Creek was named Marie Curtis Park in her honour. It was dedicated on June 5, 1959, by Fred Gardiner, the Metro chairman, and is marked by a plaque and cairn. Curtis is an inductee into the Etobicoke Hall of Fame. She was inducted in 1988.
