= Swansea, Toronto =

Swansea
- Neighbourhood
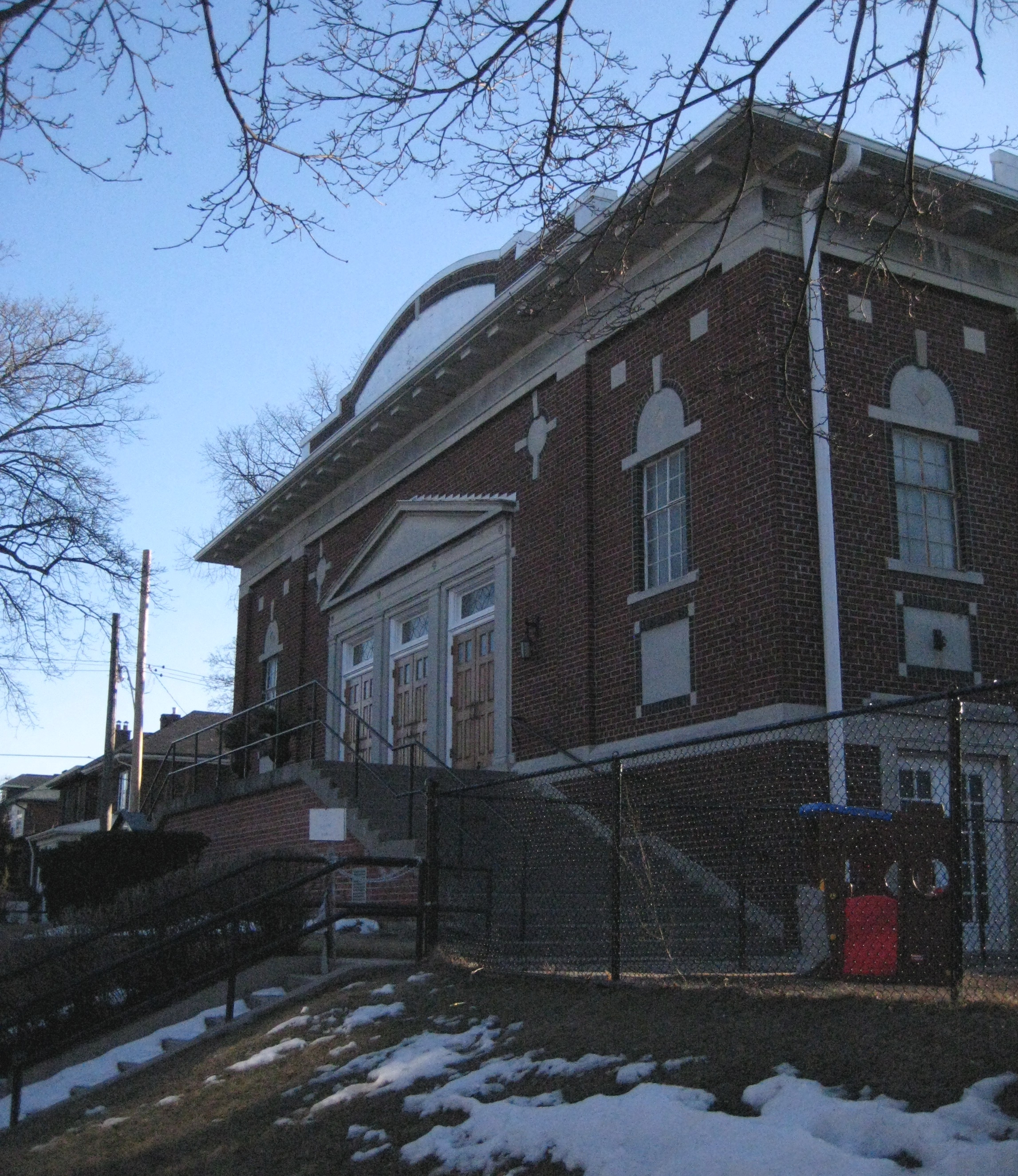
- Windermere United Church in Swansea

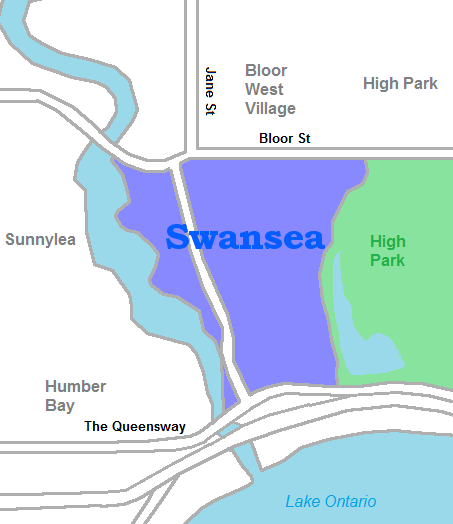
- Swansea neighbourhood map

- Location within Toronto
- Coordinates: 43°38′38″N 79°28′40″W
- Country: Canada
- Province: Ontario
- City: Toronto
- Established: 1889 (Subdivision) 'Windermere'
- Incorporated: 1926 (Village)
- Joined: 1953 (Metro Toronto)
- Annexed: 1967

Government
  - MP: Karim Bardeesy (Taiaiako'n—Parkdale—High Park)
  - MPP: Alexa Gilmour (Parkdale—High Park)
  - Councillor: Gord Perks (Ward 4 Parkdale—High Park)

Population (2006)
  - Total: 11,133
- Source:Statistics Canada
- Postal codes: M6S
- Area code: 416, 647 and 437

Swansea is a neighbourhood in the city of Toronto, Ontario, Canada, bounded on the west by the Humber River, on the north by Bloor Street, on the east by High Park and on the south by Lake Ontario. The neighbourhood was originally a separate municipality, the Village of Swansea, which became part of Metropolitan Toronto in 1953.

Swansea is represented by Ward 4 Parkdale—High Park along with the federal and provincial ridings of Parkdale—High Park and the postal code is M6S. It is patrolled by the 11 Division of the Toronto Police Service.

== Character ==
Swansea is primarily residential in nature, consisting of a mix of various housing types. Swansea's high-end homes are located either at the western edge of High Park overlooking Grenadier Pond, or on Riverside Drive and the Brule Gardens enclave bordering the Humber River. Swansea also contains a large number of semi-detached houses and bungalows located mostly in the centre of the neighbourhood. The typical house of the area was built between 1905 and 1935.

The area of the former Swansea Works is considerably newer, except for some of the original workers' homes. The Queensway was built in the 1950s through the Swansea Works lands. The area to the south was retained for industry and the area to the north was redeveloped with apartment buildings and townhome developments. The area of the actual factory site has been redeveloped since 2000 into townhomes and condominium apartments.

Swansea has several main streets. Along the northern boundary, Bloor Street is a four-lane arterial road with businesses lining both sides. To the south, The Queensway is a four-lane arterial road with a streetcar right-of-way. The Queensway has primarily residences on both sides. Swansea is bounded by Lake Ontario to the south. North-south, Swansea has two major roads, South Kingsway and Windermere Avenue. Along the southern boundary is the Gardiner Expressway which has an interchange with South Kingsway and the CNR railway lines. Further to the south, Lake Shore Boulevard runs east–west parallel to the lake shore.

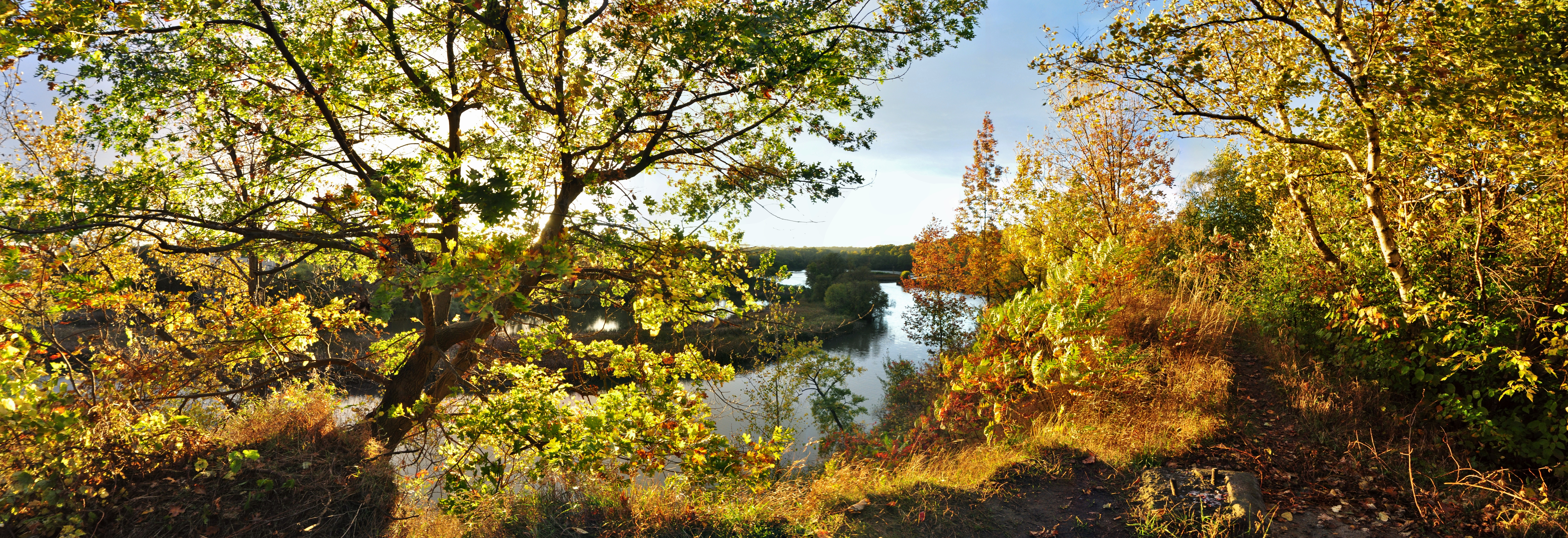
View of the Humber River from the Humber Marshes, located in the western portion of Swansea.

The area is hilly in nature. The waters of Grenadier Pond, Rennie Pond, and the Humber River all are at or near the level of Lake Ontario. The majority of the lands of 'upper' Swansea are 30 to 40 feet (9.1 to 12.2 m) higher than this, with steep hillsides along Grenadier Pond, Humber River, and Rennie Pond.

== History ==
The nearby mouth of the Humber River was the southern terminus of the route First Nations people used to travel from Lake Ontario to Lake Huron, and the other upper lakes. It is at this spot between 1615 and 1618 that it is believed that Étienne Brûlé was the first European to view Lake Ontario, with his party of indigenous and French explorers. The foot of the Humber was also the site of a French fur trading post.

When the fall of the French Regime came in 1760, Jean-Bonaventure Rousseau, a fur trader, of French descent, was trading furs at the mouth of the Humber River. The British Quebec government granted Rousseau a license to continue his trading in 1770. In the late 1780s, his son Jean Baptiste Rousseau began developing a parcel of 500 acres around the trading post. Rousseau was living at his 'Rousseau House' when Lieutenant Governor John Graves Simcoe arrived with the first English settlers for the new settlement of York and Rousseau guided the new governor's ship into Toronto Bay (now Toronto's harbour). When York was first surveyed, the entire area along the Humber River was designated as a Mill Reserve (forest to be left intact for the use of the King's Sawmill. Rousseau refused an offer to relocate across the river to Etobicoke and left the area. Rousseau moved his main area of development to Ancaster, Ontario in 1795. The site of 'Rousseau House' is today marked by a plaque.

By the 1880s, the mill reserve in Swansea was still unused and the area was subdivided into 'wood lots' (sections of forest to be sold to families living further away for use as timber fuel).

Through the 19th century the area later known as Swansea was divided between two farm lots:

The western half of Swansea became surveyed as lots 39 and 40. The lots were laid out south of Bloor Street, lot 1 starting to the east, and the numbers increasing in the western direction. Lot 40 was directly south-east of Jane Street extending east to where Windermere Avenue intersects Bloor Street. Lot 39, the next to the east saw the first development, on property owned by Mark Coe. By 1884, along Bloor Street, several blocks were subdivided as far south as today's Morningside Avenue, then known as Grenadier Road, and as far east as today's Kennedy Avenue. These are the only streets in Swansea laid out on a grid pattern, possibly because this section is relatively flat.

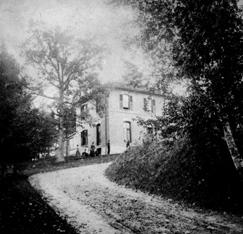
The estate of John Ellis c. 1880, whose lot comprised what is now the eastern half of Swansea.

The eastern half of what is now Swansea was a forested lot purchased in 1838 by early Toronto artist, philanthropist and architect John Ellis whose home, 'Herne Hill', stood on Grenadier Heights overlooking Grenadier Pond. The north–south street that connects to Grenadier Heights was named 'Ellis' in honour of Swansea's first family. Despite the building of a railway along the south of his estate in the 1850s, Mr Ellis did not develop his lot. With the death of John Ellis' widow in 1884, the Ellis estate became the property of John Ellis Jr. who sold off the land to the north of Herne Hill. The house itself was demolished in 1925. 71 acres (29 ha) of former Ellis lands on the east side of Grenadier Pond were bought by Toronto and merged with High Park in 1930.

=== Windermere & Swansea ===
By the 1880s, the area south of Bloor was known as 'Windermere' after England's Lake District which it is said to have resembled. To the south, industry developed on Coe's land along the railway line, including the Ontario Bolt Works, just east of the Humber, which replaced a factory on the site of today's streetcar yards at Roncesvalles. Built in 1882, its cornerstone laying attended by Prime Minister John A. Macdonald, the factory lands extended north to today's Morningside Avenue. In 1889, the factory was bought by James Worthington and the name changed to Swansea Works, Worthington himself being from the Swansea area of Wales. The factory became the major employer in the area with subsidiary industrial lands to the north of today's The Queensway. A settlement of workers' cottages built by Worthington dating from the 1880s grew around the plant. The factory, burnt down in 1906 and rebuilt, became part of Stelco in 1910, and it remained in operation until 1989.

In the centre of Swansea were several elongated ponds running north–south. The largest, Catfish Pond, is the only one that has survived. Some of the ponds were filled in for the railway line and industrial area. One of the ponds on the former Coe property, on the site of today's Swansea Mews public housing project, was turned into a dump and filled in with tailings.

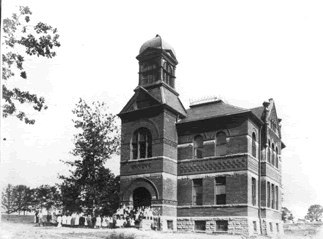
Swansea Public School, c. 1908.

By 1890, the area was known as Swansea, with a train stop on the Great Western at Windermere. The post office was in the Works building, and church services were also held there. Worthington promoted the community, giving land for Swansea Public School in 1890 and the mission church. Worthington's ownership of the Bolt Works ended not long afterward, and the Works was eventually absorbed into Stelco in 1910.

=== Village of Swansea ===
Federal census population history of Swansea
Year	Pop.	±%
1931	5,031	—
1941	6,988	+38.9%
1951	8,072	+15.5%
1956	8,595	+6.5%
1961	9,628	+12.0%
1966	9,703	+0.8%
Source: Statistics Canada

In 1926, Swansea separated from York Township and incorporated as a village. The largely forested village saw the building of many upper-middle-class homes on the former Ellis estate as a quiet 'leafy' neighbourhood developed.

The Swansea Village corporate seal reveals a great deal about the colourful history of the neighbourhood. Included on the Swansea seal is explorer Étienne Brûlé, who (some believe) in 1615 became the first European to set foot on what is now Swansea and also shown is a First Nations member. This is symbolic in that it recognizes that First Nations members were the first people to inhabit Swansea, thousands of years ago. The hills in the Swansea Village seal represent Swansea's rolling countryside. The water in the Swansea seal refers to Swansea's natural boundaries, which include Lake Ontario, the Humber River and Grenadier Pond.

=== Joining the City of Toronto ===
In 1967, the Village of Swansea joined the City of Toronto (having previously become part of Metropolitan Toronto in 1953). With the extension of Toronto's Queen Street and Queen streetcar line as 'The Queensway' following the southern limits of the village, Swansea quickly urbanised with many apartment buildings being built in the western half of the area. The small strip of industrial land housing the former wire works between The Queensway and Lake Shore Boulevard has been largely redeveloped as a high-density residential mix of towers and townhouses.

== Demographics ==
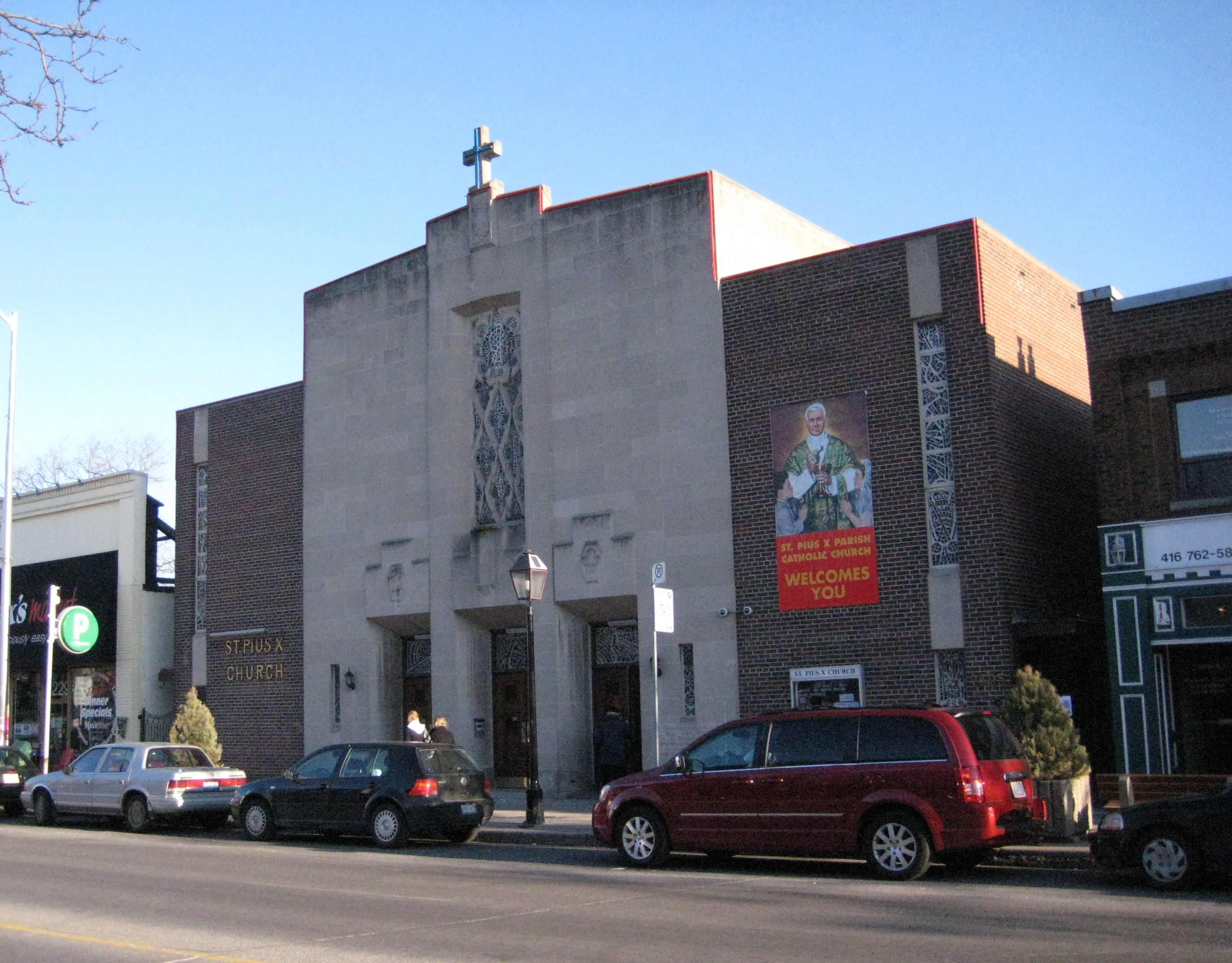
St Pius X Catholic Parish on Bloor Street.

Census tracts 0050.01 and 0050.02 of the 2006 Canadian census cover Swansea. According to that census, the neighborhood has 11,133 residents, up 0.5% since the 2001 census. Average income is $58,681, well above the Toronto average. Like much of West Toronto, the largest ethnic minorities are Eastern European. The ten most common languages in the neighbourhood, after English, are:

1. Polish: 3.0%
2. Ukrainian: 2.6%
3. Serbian: 2.3%
4. Russian: 2.2%
5. French: 0.9%
6. Portuguese: 0.9%
7. Spanish: 0.8%
8. Bengali: 0.7%
9. Croatian: 0.7%
10. Korean: 0.6%

== Recreation ==
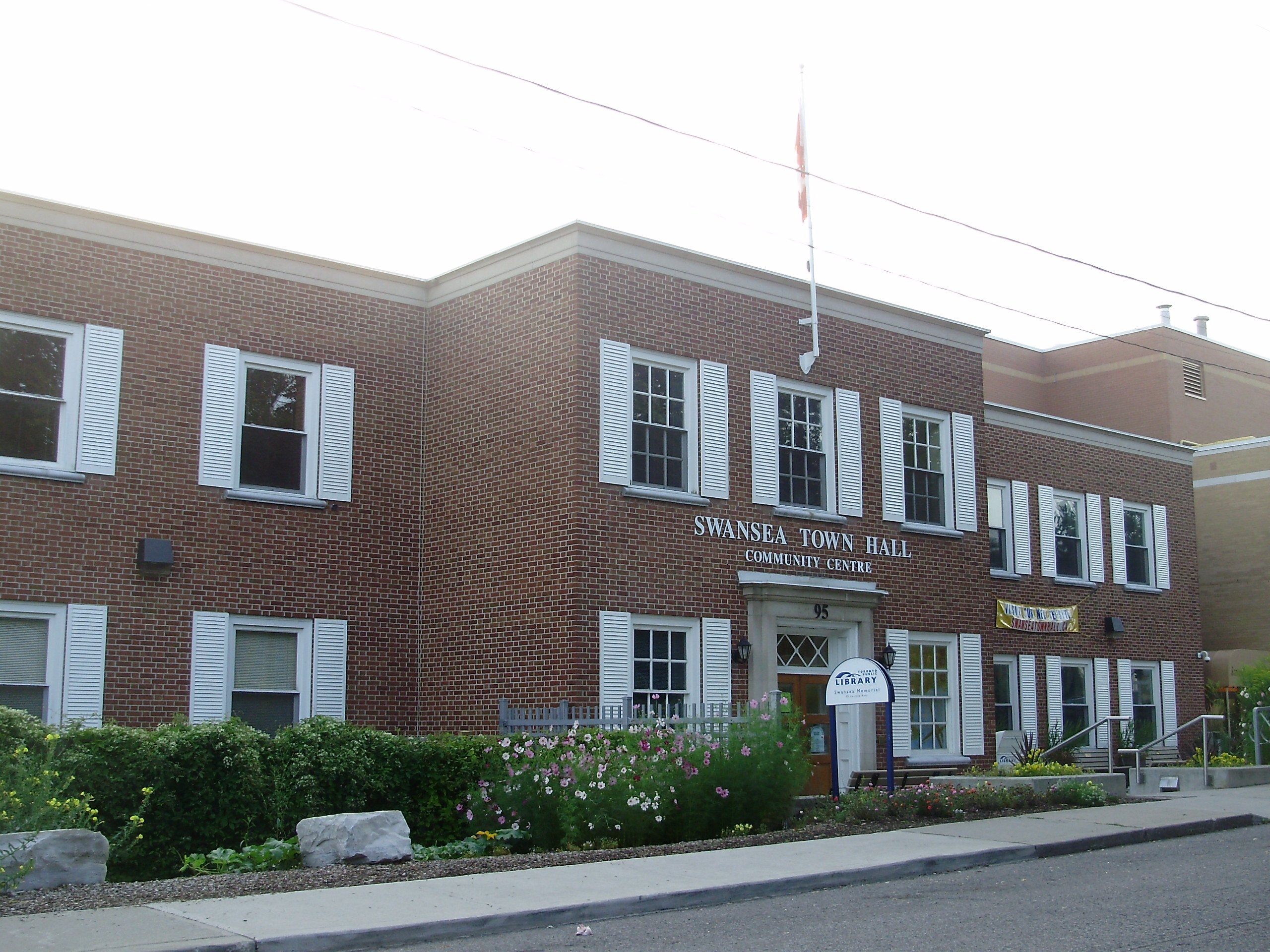
The former Swansea Town Hall now serves as a community centre for the neighbourhood.

The former Swansea Town Hall is now the Swansea Town Hall Community Centre which includes a selection of meeting rooms available for a variety of functions. It is also the home of the Swansea Memorial Public Library, the second smallest branch of the Toronto Public Library system. This branch specializes in material for children and seniors and provides complete inter-library loan services.

=== Parks ===
Rennie Park, located on the east side of Rennie Terrace, south of Morningside Avenue, has four tennis courts, an artificial ice rink, and a wading pool. Swansea Recreational Centre, a part of Swansea Public School, has a gym and a swimming pool. High Park features a full day of recreational activities including fishing, theatre performances, train rides, an animal zoo, historical exhibits, a restaurant and a myriad of fitness opportunities.

== Reeves of the Village of Swansea ==
The village reeve was the head of the village council and the equivalent of a mayor. Swansea had its own reeve from its attainment of village status in 1926 until its dissolution on December 31, 1966.

Reeves of the Village of Swansea
No.	Reeve	Term in office	Other offices	Biography
1	James Arthur Harvey	1926-1927		Leading local architect. Among the first in Toronto develop the two and three storey walk-up apartment block. Created 'Harcroft', adjacent to High Park, which was one of the first bird and wild flower sanctuaries in Canada.
2	Robert John Wallace	1928-1937	Previously Mayor of Alliston, Ontario; Manager of Swansea Hydro	Immigrated from Ireland at the age of 2, Wallace moved to Toronto in 1912 after having lived in Alliston, Ontario. He was active in the Conservative party. Died in 1964 at the age of 93.
3	Clarence C. Downey	1938-1945	Chairman of Toronto Transit Commission (1960–1963); Toronto Transit Commission commissioner (1960–1968)	Lawyer with a practice in west Toronto
4	Elmer Brandon	1946-1951	Progressive Conservative MPP for York West (1951–1956)	Lawyer by profession
5	C. Douglas Cameron	1952	Councillor (1945–1949); Deputy Reeve (1946–1949)	Cameron was an accountant with the Dominion Income Tax Bureau
6	Dorothy Hague	1953-1962	School trustee (1933–1949); Chairman of Swansea Board of Education for 7 years First elected Swansea Councillor in 1949; Deputy Reeve (1951–1952); Also served on Metro Toronto Executive; Chair of Metro Parks and Planning Committees	Taught Latin at Mimico High School from 1922 to 1924. Hague was the descendant of pioneers and is credited, as chair of the Metro Conservation Authority's historic sites advisory board, with winning Metro and the province's support for the creation of Black Creek Pioneer Village. First woman reeve of Swansea and, with Marie Curtis, first woman reeve or mayor in York County. On Metro Council, she fought against amalgamation of Swansea into Toronto and in favour of spending for public transit over expressways.
7	Lucien C. Kurata	1963- April 30, 1966	Provincial court judge (1966–69)	First Japanese-Canadian to be called to the bar in Ontario, in 1948. He was the first Japanese-Canadian called to the bench when he was appointed as a provincial court magistrate in 1966. He was removed in 1969 after a public inquiry determined he was unfit, leading the provincial cabinet to remove him from the bench. He was the first judge to be removed from the bench under the Provincial Courts Act. In 1969, Justice Donald Keith of the Ontario Supreme Court ruled in a 221-page report that Kurata was "unfit by reason of misbehavior" and that in a 76-day period in 1968, Kurata had attempted suicide, offered to use his influence to reduce charges against a prostitute in exchange for sexual favours, and made the same offer to an undercover female police officer posing as a prostitute, whom he had indecently assaulted. After being removed from the bench, he moved to Shelburne, Ontario in 1969, where he restarted his legal practice. He died two years later, aged 48.
8	James T. Bonham	May 2 - December 31, 1966	School trustee on Swansea Board of Education (1945–1962); Swansea councillor (1963-1966); Chairman of the Toronto Board of Education (1971); Toronto school trustee (1970-1972)	Worked for Goodyear Tire and Rubber Co. as a cost accountant for 43 years. As a village school trustee led the campaign for an indoor ice rink and helped establish a music program and a remedial reading program at Swansea's only elementary school. Initiated eye and dental exams for all children attending the school.

== Prominent residents ==
- Lucy Maud Montgomery - writer of the Anne of Green Gables series of books, lived in a home at 210 Riverside Drive from 1935 to 1942. A small park named after Montgomery is located on Riverside Drive, between Riverside Trail and Riverside Crescent.
- Rita Cox - librarian and storyteller who spent most of her career as the head of the Parkdale branch of Toronto Public Library. She was identified as living in Swansea in 2010.
