= Joseph Cornish =

Canadian lawyer and politician (1911–2004)

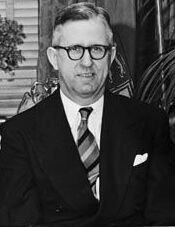
Joseph Cornish in 1956

F. Joseph Cornish Q.C. (1911 – September 28, 2004) was a lawyer, judge and Toronto politician who served as alderman for Ward 2 and as a member of the Toronto Board of Control as well as a Metro Toronto Councillor.

Cornish was born to Harold Cornish and Grace (Quinlan) Cornish. He graduated from Royal Military College of Canada in 1933 and obtained his law degree from Osgoode Hall Law School.

He served during World War II as a captain in The Governor General's Horse Guards.

Cornish was elected to Toronto City Council as alderman for Ward 2 in 1950 and was re-elected in 1951 and 1952. He was first won citywide election to the Board of Control in 1955 and was re-elected in 1956 and 1957.

He ran for Mayor of Toronto in the 1958 municipal election but failed to unseat Mayor Nathan Phillips and placed third.

Cornish returned to his law practice following his defeat and wrote and published the Quinlan Reports summaries of Ontario Municipal Board proceedings. He was one of the founding directors of the Ontario Legal Aid Plan.

Cornish was appointed a judge in the County of York in 1971 and retired from the bench in 1981.

A devout Roman Catholic, Cornish was involved in a number of lay organizations including the Michaelmas Conference at St. Michael's College and the St. Vincent de Paul's Society.
