= Frederick W. Hall (Canadian magistrate) =

Canadian judge (1893/94–1977)

Frederick Wilfred Hall

Reeve of York
- In office January 1, 1952 – August 27, 1956
- Preceded by: William George Beech
- Succeeded by: Christopher Tonks

Personal details
- Born: 1893 or 1894
- Died: August 17, 1966
- Occupation: merchant, municipal official

Frederick Wilfred Hall (1893/1894 — August 17, 1977) was a Canadian magistrate, municipal official, and politician in Metropolitan Toronto. He served as reeve of the Township of York, Toronto from 1952 to 1956 and then as the first chairman of the Metropolitan Toronto Licensing Commission from 1956 to 1963, and president of the Metropolitan Toronto Housing Corporation from 1963 to 1966. Hall faced corruption and bribery allegations resulting both from his term as a municipal politician and his tenure as licensing commission chairman, though he was never convicted of any crime.

A merchant, Hall was first elected to York council in 1940 as councillor for Ward 1. In the 1951 election, he ran against three others for the position of reeve, including former reeve Charles McMaster, and won.

Hall was a long-time proponent of the federation of Toronto-area municipalities into the Municipality of Metropolitan Toronto in 1953 and was a founding member of Metropolitan Toronto council and was a member of its executive committee.

Hall resigned as reeve on August 27, 1956, in order to accept an appointment to the chairmanship of the new Metropolitan Toronto Licensing Commission. His appointment was recommended by the provincial cabinet. In accordance with the practice at the time, he was concurrently appointed a magistrate.

In the early 1960s, Hall was accused of having accepted bribes from contractors and developers a decade earlier, as reeve, in exchange for helping them obtain building permits to build apartment buildings, contrary to zoning by-laws. After a judicial inquiry into municipal corruption, Hall and other township officials were charged with accepting bribes but were acquitted in October 1962 after a jury trial.

As the founding chairman of the Metro Licensing Commission, Hall was, amongst other things, responsible for governing the system of taxi licensing in the municipality. The system issued licenses in the forms of plates. The licenses were intended to be held by taxi drivers who were not permitted to rent them out to others. Due to lax enforcement by Hall, allegedly in exchange for bribes and kickbacks, a black market developed and it became possible for a small number of businessmen and investors to each gain ownership of hundreds of taxi plates and then rent them out to individual drivers for a fee, contrary to the letter of the by-law. It also became possible to transfer ownership of plates for hundreds of thousands of dollars. Speaking to the Toronto Star in the 1980s, one major taxi plate owner, Jack Goldberg, told the newspaper: "Fred Hall was a crook. You wanted something, you paid him off. Right there, right in his office, cash. That's the way it worked."

Hall died of a heart attack while trimming a hedge, aged 83.
