= May Robinson =

Canadian politician (1886–1973)

Alderman on the Toronto City Council
- In office 1951–1964
- Constituency: Ward 6

Personal details
- Born: Ella May Crabbe; 1886 near Norwich, Ontario, Canada
- Died: April 27, 1973 (aged 86–87) Toronto, Ontario, Canada
- Spouse: George Robinson (m. 1911; died 1956)
- Children: 3

Ella May Robinson (née Crabbe; 1886 – April 27, 1973) was a Canadian politician and suffragist who was active in municipal politics of Toronto, Ontario. She was one of the first women to serve on the Toronto City Council, serving from 1951 to 1964, and the first woman to serve on the Metro Toronto Council upon its establishment in 1953.

== Early life and career ==
Ella May Crabbe was born in 1886 near Norwich, Ontario, into a farming family. The daughter of Charles Crabbe, she was one of seven children, and of Irish, Pennsylvania Dutch and French ancestry. She came to Toronto in 1910 and served as secretary of the Toronto Women's Suffrage Association in 1916. During this time, she met Emmeline Pankhurst during a visit to Toronto, and was also an advocate for women to serve as church elders.

== Municipal politics ==
Robinson was elected as a Toronto Public School Board trustee in 1938, where she served for 11 years. She was initially elected to the Toronto City Council in December 1951, representing Ward 6 (Davenport and Parkdale). During her time as an alderman, she was an advocate for seniors' housing. Robinson retired at the 1964 Toronto municipal election.

== Personal life and death ==
She was married to George Edward Robinson, an insurance executive. He died in 1956. They had three children, two sons and a daughter. She was a member and elder of the St. Clair Avenue United Church. In addition to her church, she was active in local Toronto organizations such as the Local Council for Women, Federation for Community Service, Toronto Urban Trustees' Association and Young Women's Christian Association.

May Robinson died in Toronto on April 27, 1973, from a heart ailment. Upon her death, she was described as a friendly and outspoken figure during her time on council, and one of the "best known persons in Toronto public life".
