= Visitor attractions in Regina, Saskatchewan =

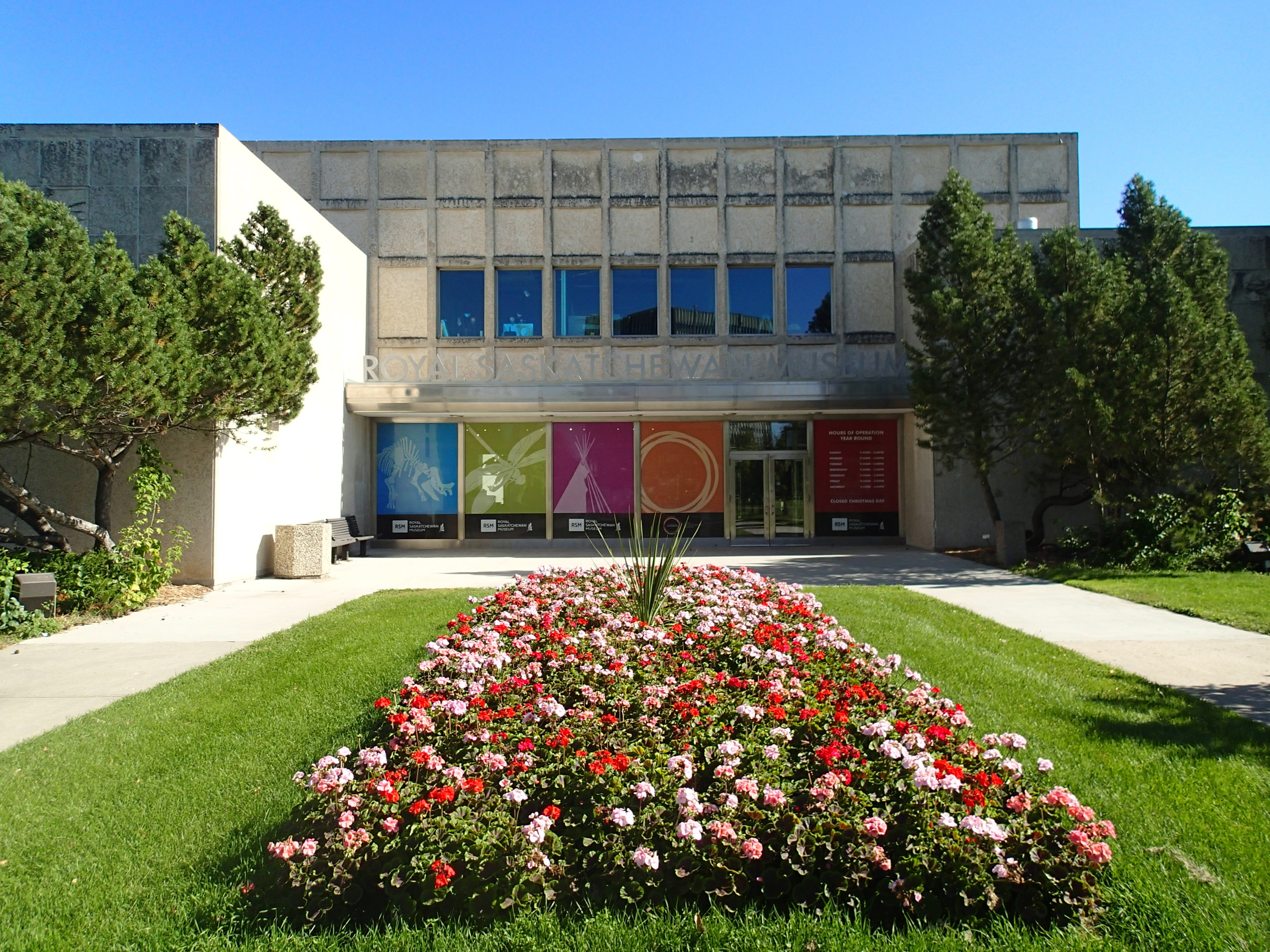
The Royal Saskatchewan Museum.

Regina is the capital city of Saskatchewan and situated along the Trans-Canada Highway. This is a list of attractions for visitors located in the city.

== Attractions ==
=== Casinos ===
Casino Regina: Located in the Canadian Pacific Railway station on Saskatchewan Drive, formerly South Railway Street.

=== Government ===
- Government House (Saskatchewan): The Government House was a residence of NWT and Saskatchewan lieutenant-governors from 1892-1944; it was restored to its state in the 19th century and is open to the public.
- Saskatchewan Legislative Building

=== Venues and events ===
- Globe Theatre: One of only two arena theatres in North America. It produces six shows in the Evraz Main Stage Season each year, and up to four shows in the Shumiatcher Sandbox Series.
- Mosaic Stadium: A municipally owned football stadium that is home to the Saskatchewan Roughriders, and the Regina Rams; it opened in 2017.
- REAL District: This facility is the venue for:
  - Brandt Centre: A combination facility seating up to 7500 people, it serves primarily as an ice surface for hockey, curling and concerts. During Agribition, it also hosts the National Finals Rodeo. The Brandt Centre is often referred to by its former name: the Regina Agridome.
  - Canada’s Farm Show: held in late spring, it is touted as North America's largest dryland farming show with an emphasis on the newest technology and equipment.
  - Canadian Western Agribition: A livestock show held annually in late November.
  - Credit Union EventPlex: A 90,000 square foot multi-purpose facility with a removable turf field that opened in the summer of 2005. It is home to Regina's indoor soccer community and has hosted the Brier patch (a beer garden that holds approximately 6400 people) for the 2006 Tim Hortons Brier and the wrestling venue for the 2005 Canada Summer Games.
- Queen City Ex: Similar to an American county or state fair, it is usually held the first week of August.
  - Royal Red Arabian Horse Show: Showing of Arabian horses.

=== Museums ===
- MacKenzie Art Gallery: Formerly located on the Regina College campus of the University of Regina, now relocated to the T.C. Douglas Building on the southwest extremity of Wascana Centre.
- RCMP Heritage Centre: A law enforcement museum that houses exhibits on the Royal Canadian Mounted Police (RCMP) and artifacts relating to the police force. The building was designed by architect Arthur Erickson.
- Royal Saskatchewan Museum - The Royal Saskatchewan Museum is a museum of natural history.
- Saskatchewan Science Centre: An interactive science museum, located in the former city powerhouse on the north shore of Wascana Lake opposite the Conexus Arts Centre.

=== Nature ===
- Regina Floral Conservatory
