= List of botanical gardens in Canada =

== Alberta ==
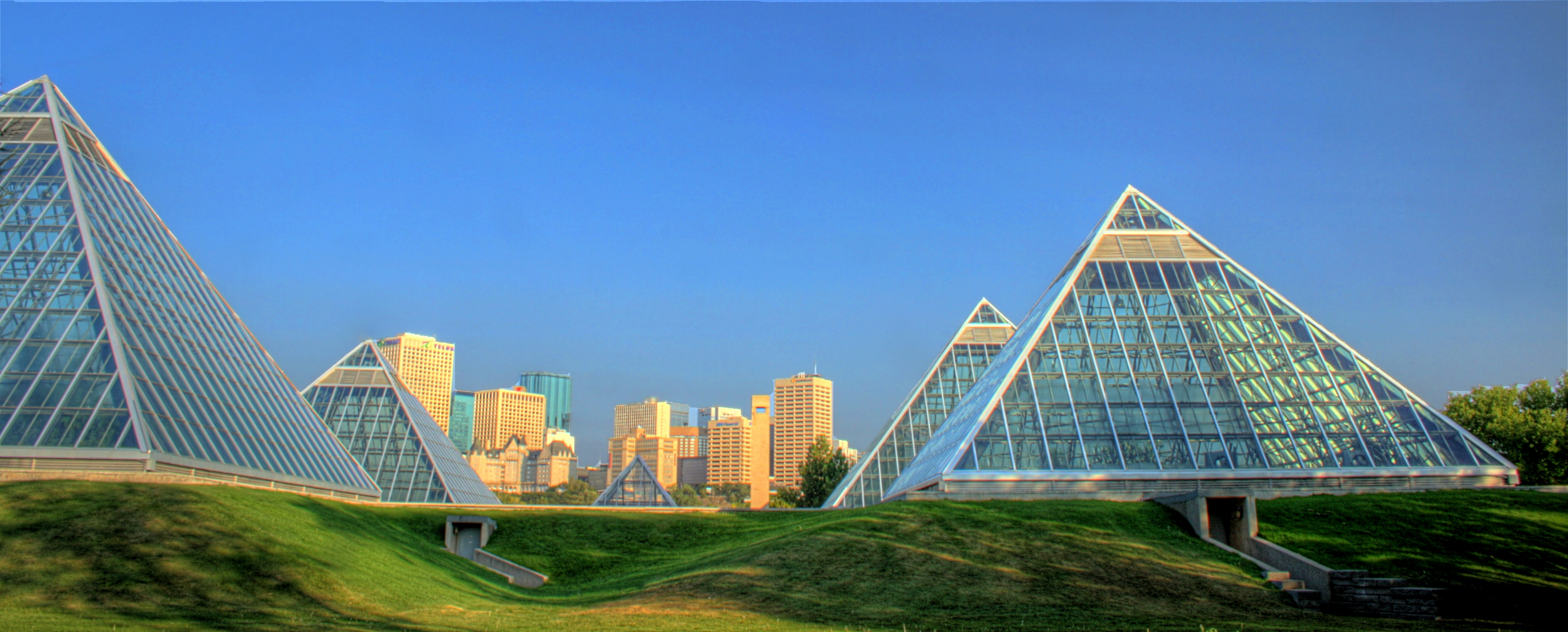
The Muttart Conservatories in Edmonton, Alberta

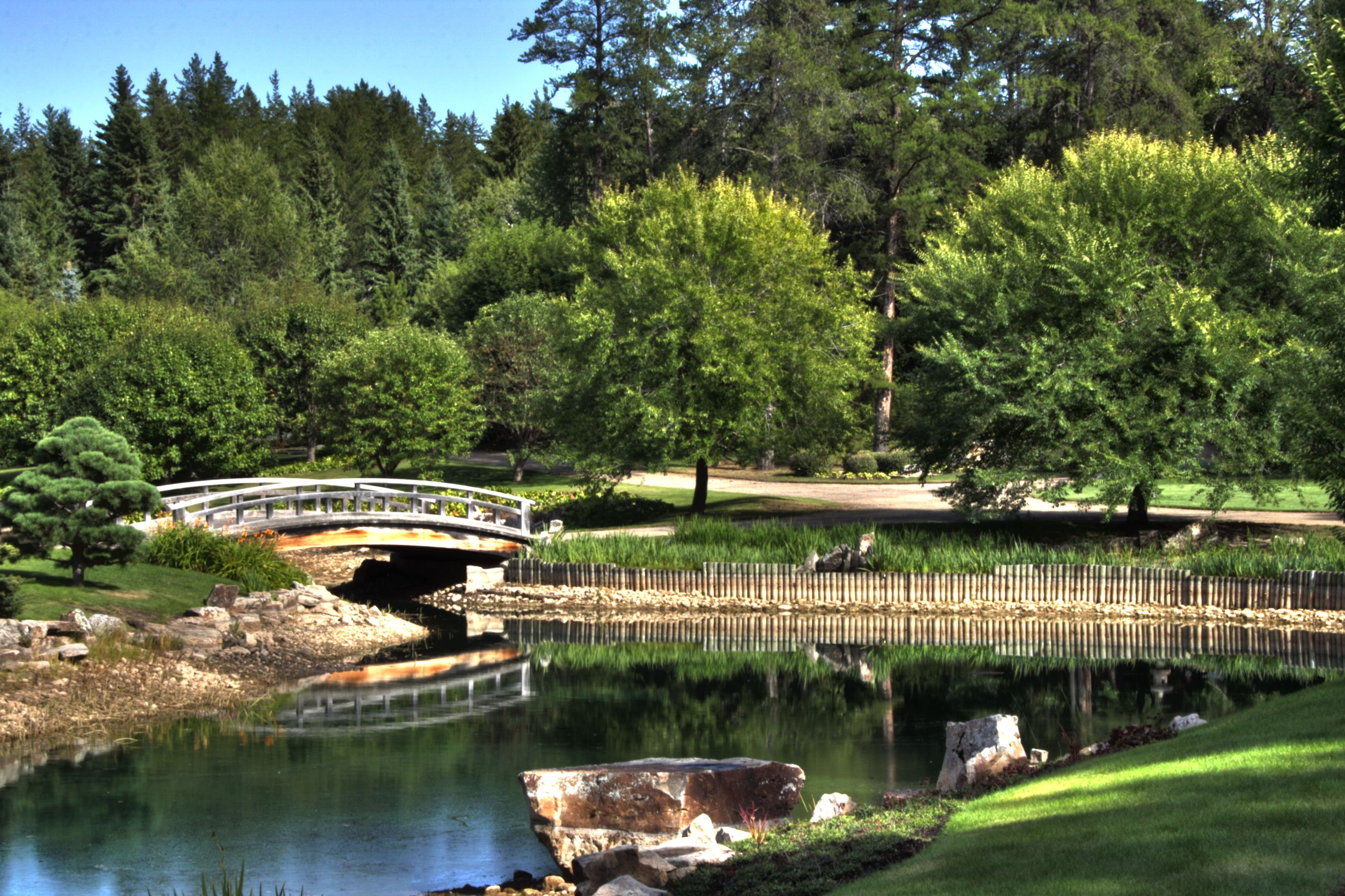
The Japanese garden in Edmonton's Devonian Botanic Garden

- Alberta Horticultural Research Center, Brooks
- Calgary Zoological Gardens, Calgary
- Devonian Gardens (Calgary), Calgary
- Cascades of Time Garden (Banff), Banff
- George Pegg Botanic Garden, Glenevis
- Lee Pavilion located within the Citadel Theatre, Edmonton
- Lethbridge Research and Development Centre, Lethbridge
- Muttart Conservatory, Edmonton
- Nikka Yuko Japanese Garden, Lethbridge
- Olds College Botanic Garden, Olds
- St. Albert Botanic Park, St. Albert
- University of Alberta Botanic Garden, Devon, Alberta

== British Columbia ==
- Abkhazi Garden, Victoria
- Bloedel Floral Conservatory, Vancouver
- Butchart Gardens, Victoria
- Crown Forest Industries Arboretum and Museum, Ladysmith
- Darts Hill Garden Park, Surrey
- Horticulture Centre of the Pacific, Victoria
- Nitobe Memorial Garden, Vancouver
- Park and Tilford Gardens, North Vancouver
- Queen Elizabeth Park and Bloedel Floral Conservatory, Vancouver
- Royal Roads University Botanical Gardens, Victoria
- Summerland Research Station, Summerland
- The Glades Garden Park, Surrey
- UBC Botanical Garden, Vancouver
- Tofino Botanical Gardens, Tofino
- VanDusen Botanical Garden, Vancouver

== Manitoba ==
- Assiniboine Park, Winnipeg
- Manitoba Horticultural Association Arboretum, Boissevain
- Morden Research Station, Morden
- International Peace Garden, Boissevain

== New Brunswick ==
- Fredericton Botanic Garden, Fredericton
- Kingsbrae Horticultural Garden, St. Andrews
- New Brunswick Botanical Garden, Edmundston

== Newfoundland and Labrador ==
- Memorial University of Newfoundland Botanical Garden, St. John's

== Nova Scotia ==
- Annapolis Royal Historic Gardens, Annapolis Royal
- Faculty of Agriculture, Dalhousie University, Truro
- Harriet Irving Botanical Gardens, Wolfville
- Halifax Public Gardens, Halifax

== Ontario ==
- Allan Gardens, Toronto
- Bruce Botanical Food Gardens, Ripley
- Centennial Conservatory, Thunder Bay
- Centennial Park Conservatory, Etobicoke
- Dominion Arboretum and Central Experimental Farm, Ottawa
- Great Lakes Forest Research Centre Arboretum, Sault Ste. Marie
- Fanshawe College Arboretum, London
- Humber College Arboretum, Toronto
- Inglis Falls Arboretum, Owen Sound
- Jackson Park, Windsor
- Lauber Arboretum, Kakabeka Falls
- Metro Toronto Parks Commission, Toronto
  - Edwards Gardens
  - James Gardens
  - Toronto Islands
- Niagara Parks Commission, Niagara Falls
- Oshawa Valley Botanical Gardens, Oshawa
- Ottawa Valley Native Plant Botanical Garden, Cobden
- Parkwood, The R.S. McLaughlin Estate National Historic Site and Heritage Garden, Oshawa
- Plant Paradise Country Gardens, Caledon
- Quinte Botanical Garden, Frankford, Ontario
- Rockway Botanical Gardens, Kitchener
- Royal Botanical Gardens, Burlington
- Sifton Bog, London
- Toronto Botanical Garden, Toronto
- University of Guelph Arboretum, Guelph
- University of Toronto Erindale College Conservatory, Mississauga
- Toronto Zoo, Toronto
- University of Western Ontario Sherwood Fox Arboretum, London
- Vineland Research Station, Vineland
- Whistling Gardens, Wilsonville, ON

== Quebec ==
- Belle Terre Botanic Garden, Otter Lake
- Montreal Botanical Garden, Montreal
- Jardins de Métis, Grand-Métis
- Jardin Van Den Hende, Laval University, Quebec City
- Mont Royal Park, Montreal
- Man and His World, Montreal
- Morgan Arboretum, Macdonald Campus of McGill University, Sainte-Anne-de-Bellevue

== Saskatchewan ==
- PFRA Tree Nursery, Indian Head
- University of Saskatchewan Gardens, Saskatoon
- Wascana Centre Authority, Regina
- Regina Floral Conservatory, Regina

== References and notes ==
- (1981) Arboreta and Botanical Gardens of North America: a travellers guide HMS Press ISBN 0-919957-25-0
