= Francisca Darts =

Francisca Darts born Francisca Maria Koster in The Hague, Netherlands on 15 March 1916, moved to Canada to join her father Fredrik when she was nine years old. She sailed from Rotterdam on the Nieuw Amsterdam on 23 February 1926 with her mother Hendrika and sisters Louise and Marie Antoinette.

She became an accomplished figure skater in Flin Flon, Manitoba where she spent her formative years. She attributed her success to her use of traditional Dutch skates with steel blades and wooden footplates. The extreme weather in Flin Flon also allowed her to later become a champion curler.

Her life's project was the 7.5 acres of rough, stump-covered land in South Surrey, British Columbia that she and her husband Edwin (Ed) purchased in 1942, now known as Darts Hill Garden Park. In 1994, she was being pressed to sell her land to developers who were keen to build condos on the site, but instead of selling, she donated it to the City of Surrey, providing an endowment for its on-going upkeep so its collection of rare and unusual trees and shrubs could be enjoyed by citizens and visitors for years to come.

An accomplished horticulturist, she had several plants named after her, including Primula × 'Francisca', and was very active in collecting and sharing seeds and cuttings with other gardeners. Ever the low impact gardener, she discovered that Lifebouy soap suspended in old pantyhose was a great perimeter deterrent against deer.

Darts died on 26 December 2012.

== See also ==
- Darts Hill Garden Park
- Francisca Darts: The gardener's gardener (Vancouver Sun)
- A THOUSAND WORDS - Alex Waterhouse-Hayward's blog on pictures, plants, politics and whatever else is on his mind.
