= Park and Tilford Gardens =

Botanic garden in the City of North Vancouver, British Columbia, Canada

Coordinates: 49.3083°N 123.0429°W

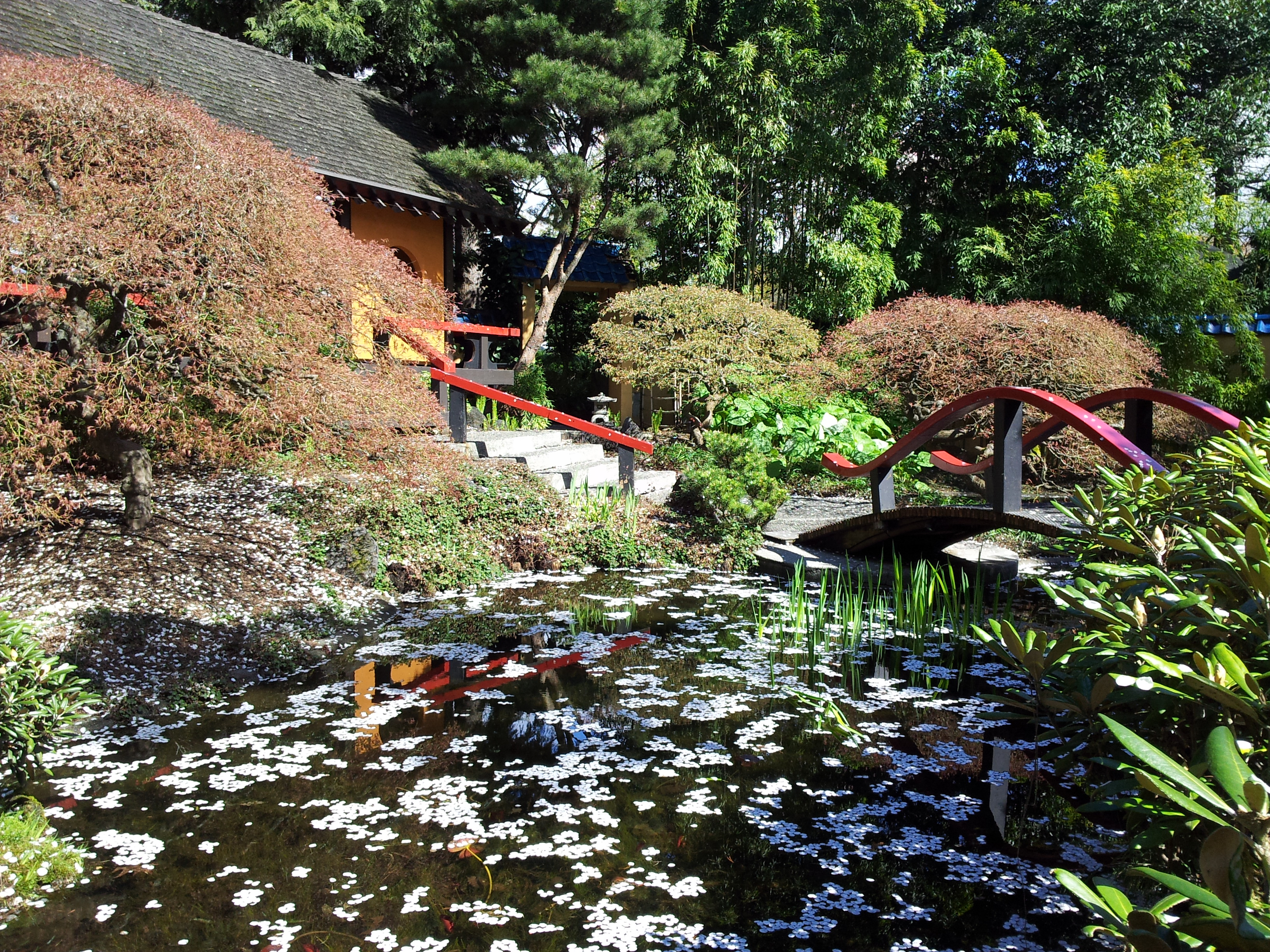
Park and Tilford Gardens

The Park & Tilford Gardens is a 1.5-acre (6,100 m^{2}) (originally 3-acre (12,000 m^{2})) botanic garden situated in the City of North Vancouver, British Columbia. The complex, established in 1969 as a community project of Canadian Park & Tilford Distilleries Ltd., consists of eight separate but interconnected areas. The original gardens were designed by Harry J. Webb of Justice & Webb Landscape Architects.

The distillery closed in 1984, and the new owner rezoned the site for commercial use. Durante Kreuk Landscape Architects designed the entry gate and Waterfall Garden as part of the 1980s redevelopment of the Park & Tilford site after the Flower Garden was demolished.

The description below outlines the gardens as they existed in the 1970s:

"Each carries its own theme and is filled with flowers, fountains, waterfalls and aviaries. The Rose Garden, with a covered arbour and Florentine pergola, has more than 25 varieties of roses, ranging from delicate miniatures to showy floribunda. Nearby, the Herb Garden, the smallest area, contains plantings of medicinal and culinary herbs. A collection of tropical plants and flowers can be seen inside the Greenhouse, including a collection of bromeliads and succulents.

In warm weather a finch aviary among the blossoms complements the Flower Garden. The floral displays in 27 circular beds are changed frequently year-round. Nearby is a Bog Garden with day lilies, skunk cabbages, ornamental grasses and a six-foot leafed Gunnera plant.

Busts of famous botanists Douglas, Carl Linnaeus, and Menzies are displayed in the Colonnade Garden, a cool area of vines arid vivid floral baskets. A larger aviary at the end of the colonnade is home for many colourful parrots, cockatoos, mynas and other tropical birds. Along the south bank is the Rhododendron Garden, sheltered by Douglas firs and dogwoods. A classic moon gate leads to the Oriental Garden, a tranquil setting reminiscent of Japan. The authentic Japanese tea house is a gift shop operated by the North Shore Association for the Physically Handicapped. The Native Wood Garden is devoted to trees and shrubs of British Columbia's coastal forests and interior semi-arid regions. A small Herb Garden is on display during summer months. There is a seed package, but not an exchange, program.

Many rare forms of plant life are present in these gardens and they are being constantly added to. As a service to visitors and their friends, the Park and Tilford Gardens have made available a selection of seeds comprising the more outstanding plant forms featured. These selections will vary from year to year as outstanding new hybrids and strains are proven.

The Park & Tilford Gardens' Review is published periodically to keep patrons up to date on events and informed with garden checklists, green thumb tips and more."

== See also ==
- List of botanical gardens in Canada
