= Bloedel Conservatory =

Conservatory and aviary

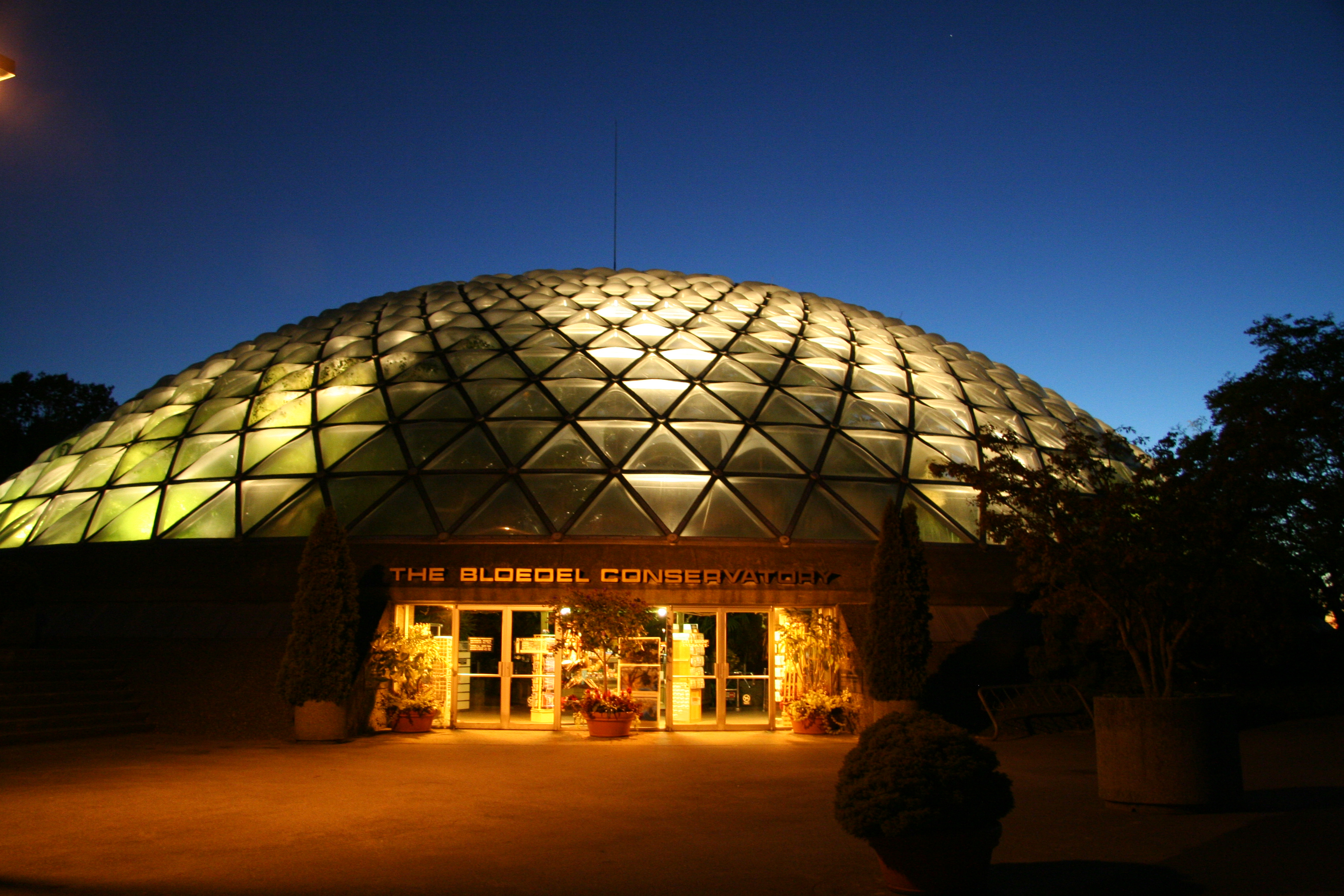
- The Bloedel Conservatory in 2006
- Interactive map of Bloedel Conservatory
- 49.2421°N 123.1138°W
- Date opened: 1969
- Location: Vancouver, British Columbia, Canada
- No. of animals: 100 birds
- No. of species: 500 plant species
- Website: vancouver.ca/parks-recreation-culture/bloedel-conservatory.aspx

The Bloedel Conservatory is a domed conservatory and aviary located at the top of Queen Elizabeth Park in Vancouver, British Columbia, Canada. Opened in 1969, it was funded through a major donation from the Bloedel Foundation alongside contributions from Vancouver City Council and the Vancouver Park Board. The triodetic dome houses around 500 species of plants and more than 200 birds. The conservatory faced closure in 2010 due to budget constraints but was preserved through community advocacy and its merger with the VanDusen Botanical Gardens.

== History ==
Leading up to the national centennial in 1967, communities and organizations across Canada were encouraged to engage in centennial projects to celebrate the country's 100th anniversary. The projects ranged from special one-time events to local improvement projects. In Vancouver, Stuart Lefeaux, superintendent of the Vancouver Park Board, and his deputy Bill Livingstone proposed an exotic plant conservatory that would be open to the public.

Building a conservatory on top of Queen Elizabeth Park's Little Mountain was a complicated project. The city had already leased the top of the mountain to the Greater Vancouver Water Board and they had built a 5 1/2-acre open water reservoir for the city's potable water supply. A concrete lid was constructed in 1965 to cover the reservoir, but approval was needed to build the conservatory's surrounding plaza on top of the cover. The project was not to detract from the natural beauty of the site, nor to jeopardize the quality of the potable water supply in the reservoir. Climates had to be simulated for temperate, tropical and arid areas in the botanical displays inside the conservatory, and the project was not to exceed the budget. Giving the immense concrete plaza over the reservoir an attractive garden atmosphere meant working within rigid and expensive water board restrictions. These challenges were overcome, and the conservatory was constructed next to this reservoir, which remains a major source of water for the city today.

Philanthropy from extraction companies was at an all-time high during the 1960s, so Lefeux and Livingstone looked for a way to get the project funded. They approached Prentice Bloedel of the Macmillan Bloedel Lumber Company. The Bloedel Foundation put forward $1.25 million in conjunction with contributions by the City of Vancouver and the Vancouver Board of Parks and Recreation to build the Bloedel Conservatory, the Dancing Fountains and the surrounding plaza. This gift was the largest the city of Vancouver had received to that date.

Architect McKinley Underwood designed the triodetic dome – an avant-garde structure inspired by Buckminster Fuller’s iconic Expo ’67 dome in Montreal. The triodetic dome frame was manufactured entirely in Ottawa and shipped 3,000 miles across the country to Queen Elizabeth Park. Once it arrived, the structural framework was erected in just 10 days. The entire dome and plaza took 18 months to complete. The grand opening of the conservatory took place to much fanfare on December 6, 1969, and hosted over 500,000 people in its first year of operation. Prentice and his wife Virginia, both avid art collectors, also donated the monumental bronze sculpture 'Knife Edge - Two Piece' by famed artist Henry Moore.

In November 2009, facing a budget shortfall, the Vancouver Park Board voted in favour of closing the conservatory, citing the approximately $240,000 CDN annual operating budget, the need for a roof replacement as well as other major capital costs as reasons for the decision. The closure was to take effect on March 1, 2010, just after Vancouver had finished hosting the 2010 Winter Olympic and Paralympic Games. In response to the decision, several groups formed in order to lobby both the board and city council.

In early January 2010, a commissioner reported that attendance numbers had increased in December 2009 when compared to December 2008, following the completion of construction projects at the adjacent reservoir on Little Mountain and along Cambie Street. By the end of January, the Friends of the Bloedel Association had helped raise $80,000, and were projecting $250,000 by the proposed March closure. In late February, the park board voted to keep the facility open and asked for proposals on running it.

On April 29, 2010, the Friends of the Bloedel Association and VanDusen Botanical Garden Association submitted a proposal to the Vancouver Park Board to run the Bloedel Conservatory as part of the VanDusen Botanical Gardens, and the conservatory remained open. At least one other proposal was received, but the joint proposal of the Friends of the Bloedel and the Association was approved by the Services and Budgets Committee of the Vancouver Park Board on July 20, 2010, and unanimously approved by the full Park Board on September 20, 2010. On May 29, 2013, the Friends of the Bloedel won the City of Vancouver Heritage Commission Award of Honour, which "denotes an outstanding contribution to heritage conservation in the City of Vancouver and recognises the advocacy and successful efforts to save and revitalize landmark sites". The VanDusen Botanical Garden Association later changed their name to the Vancouver Botanical Gardens Association to reflect the additional management of Bloedel Conservatory.

== Plants and animals ==
The conservatory contains three habitats: tropical rainforest, subtropical rainforest, and desert. Over 200 birds of various species live in the dome, as well as tropical fish of several species. In addition, the Bloedel Conservatory dome houses approximately 500 species of plants.

== Architecture ==
Located 500 feet (150 m) above sea level, the conservatory itself is a triodetic dome 140 feet (43 m) in diameter, 70 feet (21 m) high, and is made up of 1,490 plexiglass bubbles of different sizes and 2,324 pieces of extruded aluminum tubing. It contains 8 air circulating units and 24 mist sprayers to control temperature and humidity for the three climate zones inside the dome.

In the plaza adjacent to the conservatory dome is a bronze sculpture by Henry Moore, Knife Edge Two Piece 1962–65. It was donated to the Park Board by modern art collector Prentice Bloedel and his wife Virginia, alongside their donation of funding to build the conservatory, and the surrounding plaza. The piece was the first non-commemorative sculpture accepted by the Vancouver Park Board for installation.

== Photo gallery ==
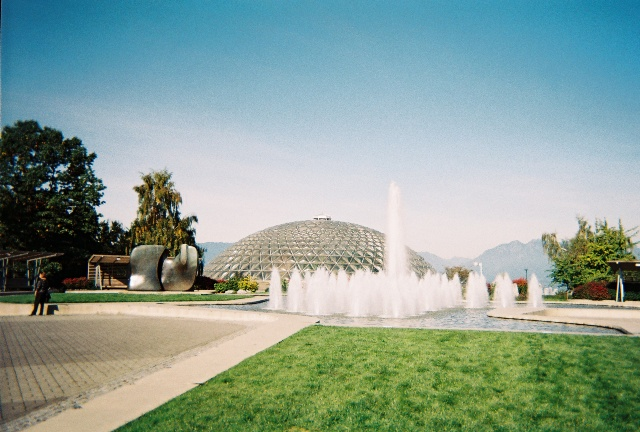
Bloedel Conservatory dome seen from the grounds

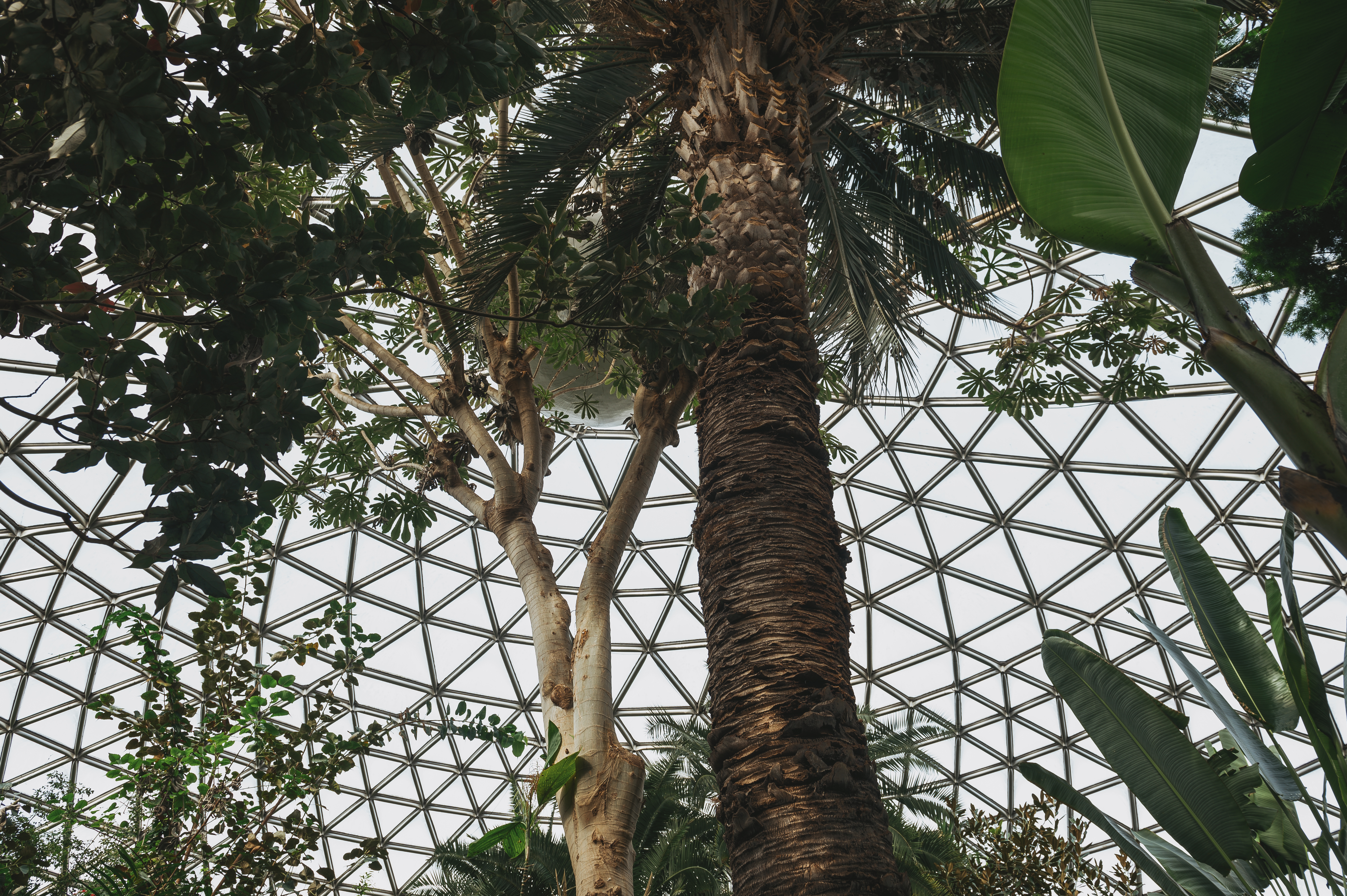
Jungle environment within the dome

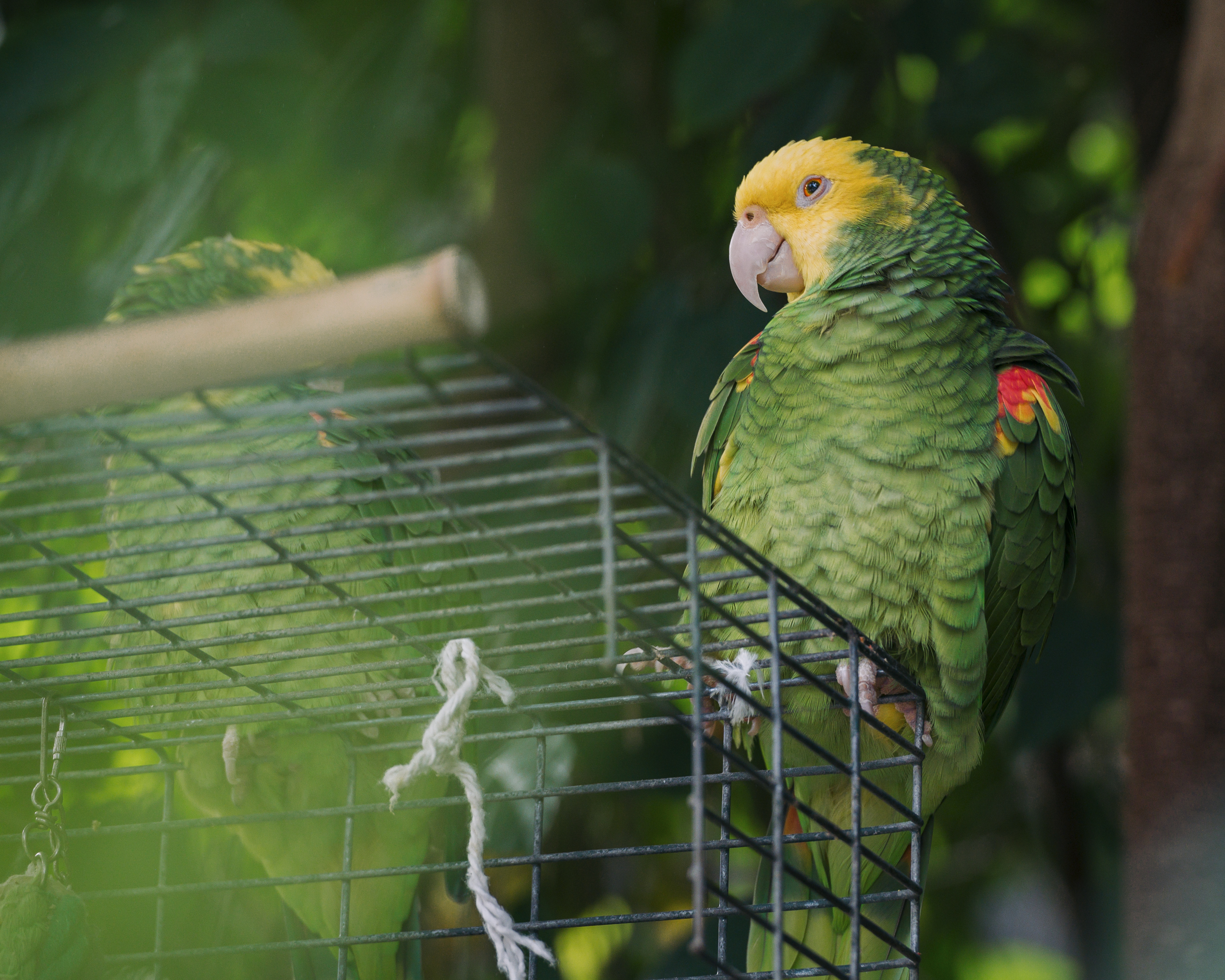
Yellow-headed amazon in Bloedel Conservatory

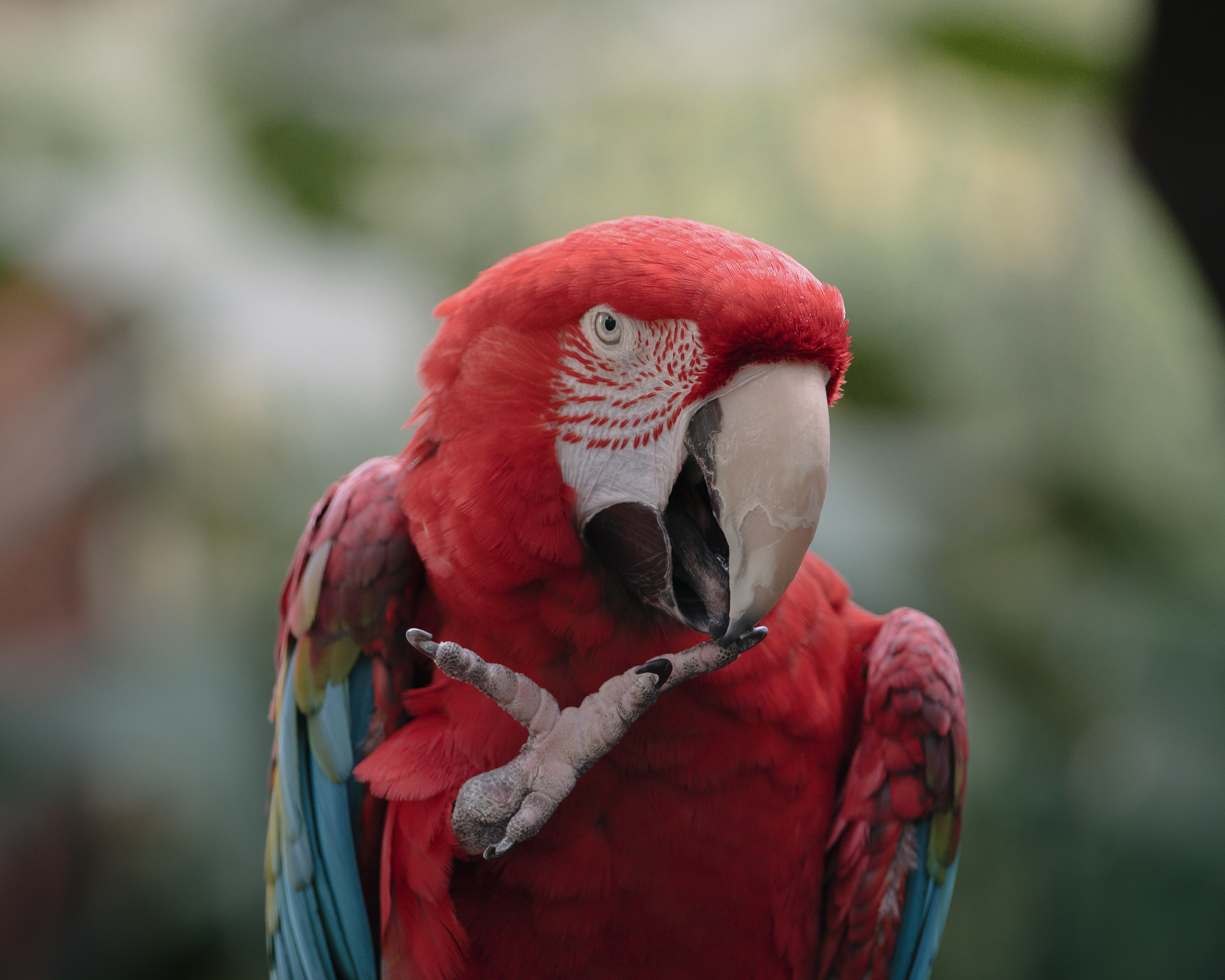
Scarlet macaw in Bloedel Conservatory

== Filming location ==
The conservatory has been used as a filming location for several movies and science fiction series including G-Saviour, Battlestar Galactica, Stargate SG-1, Gene Roddenberry's Andromeda and Beyond the Black Rainbow. Filming of a scene from episode 21, Season 3 of Supergirl also took place here.

== See also ==
- Brisbane Botanic Gardens, Mount Coot-tha, Brisbane, Australia
- Greater Des Moines Botanical Garden, Des Moines, United States
- List of botanical gardens in Canada
