= Memorial University of Newfoundland Botanical Garden =

Botanical garden in St. John's Canada

Coordinates: 47°34′15″N 52°45′25″W

The Memorial University Botanical Garden is operated by Memorial University of Newfoundland in St. John's, Newfoundland and Labrador. It is located on Mount Scio Road in the suburbs of St. John's, and was founded in 1971 under the supervision of Dr. Bernard Jackson. Originally named the Oxen Pond Botanic Park, the gardens were opened to the public in 1977 and became a not-for-profit organization in 1994. The garden and nature trails were developed to provide a place where people of all ages and depths of interest can learn about the plants and natural environment of Newfoundland. The official emblem of the Garden is the twinflower (Linnaea borealis).

== Site ==
The Botanical Garden property encloses an area of 110 acres (0.45 km^{2}), including Oxen Pond (for which the garden was originally named). The main building (Field Centre) is located on a 3-acre (12,000 m^{2}) site on Mount Scio Road. The main garden area includes a greenhouse, an alpine house featuring high latitude plants, rock gardens, peat gardens, a heritage garden and a demonstration vegetable garden. The Garden is also a nature reserve, featuring 3.5km of trails in the surrounding boreal forest. Moose, snowshoe hare, ruffed grouse, common loons, black ducks, a large variety of songbirds, and other wildlife are frequently observed inside the park boundaries.

== Butterflies ==
Plants producing nectar have been developed to maintain the two species of swallowtail butterflies, three species of whites and sulphur butterflies, five species of woodnymphs, ten species of brush-footed butterflies, four gossamer, and two skipper species that are found within the park. Three known overwintering butterflies stay as adults during the winter in the Garden's man-made butterfly houses. The concept of the butterfly house was designed by the Garden's original director, Dr. Bernard Jackson. The three species are known as the green comma, the mourning cloak, and Milbert's tortoiseshell. These butterflies are three of the very few butterflies that hibernate as adults during the winter.

== The Friends of the Garden ==
Members of the Friends of the Garden (FOG) are individuals who support the objectives of the Memorial University Botanical Garden. Volunteers have assisted the Garden since its creation in 1971; the FOG organization formed in 1976 and became a charitable organization in 1977. In August 2025, FOG had approximately 150 members. FOG volunteers provide support through fundraising activities (including their bi-annual plant sales), plant propagation, carpentry work, trail monitoring, leading birding walks, special event support, and more.

== Education ==
The Garden acts as an outdoor classroom for students of Memorial University and a research facility for its faculty. Staff and researchers engage in plant propagation and seed banking of species native to the island of Newfoundland, and restore habitats for species at risk.

Educational programs for the general public include guided tours, lectures on various subjects, and workshops.

== See also ==
- List of botanical gardens in Canada
