= Morden Research Station =

Arboretum in Morden, Manitoba

Morden Research Station is an arboretum in Morden, Manitoba. In 1924, the arboretum was started by W.R. Leslie, adding to the Agriculture Canada Research Station established in 1915. Since then, the agriculture station has introduced dozens of new fruit, vegetable, field and ornamental crops. In 1989, a 5,100 sq. metre office and laboratory complex was opened. That year, the arboretum donated its old barn to Pembina Thresherman's Museum, and the barn was moved to the new location in 1990. The arboretum and its landscaped grounds and picnic facilities are open to the public daily during the summer months from May until September.

== See also ==
List of botanical gardens in Canada
