= University of Guelph Arboretum =

Arboretum in Guelph, Ontario, Canada

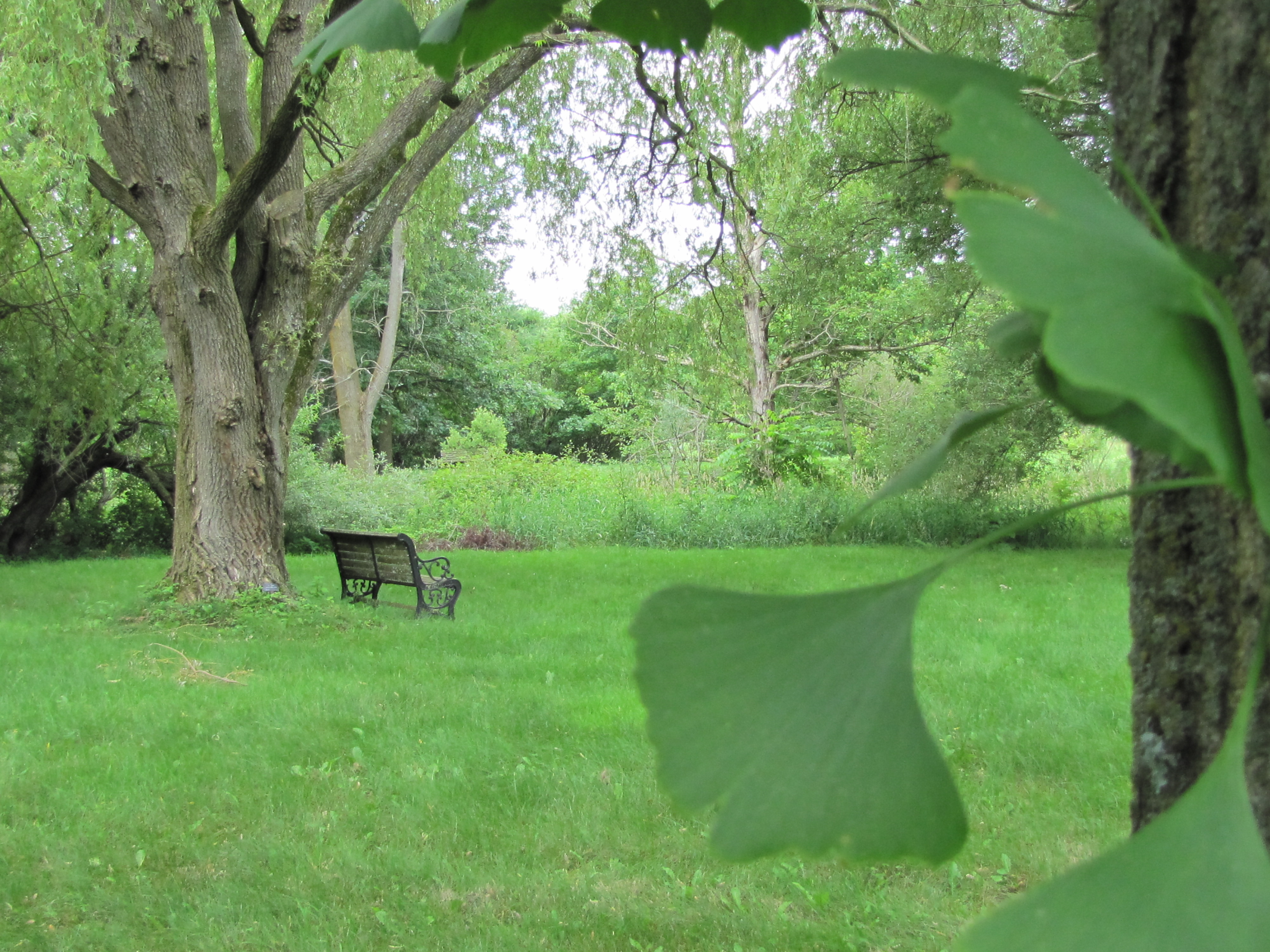
- A summer day in The Arboretum.

Facts
- Location: Guelph, Ontario
- Coordinate: 43°32′27″N 80°12′54″W
- Built: 1971
- Area: 165 hectares (410 acres)
- Director: Justine Richardson
- Governing Body: University of Guelph
- Homepage: University of Guelph Arboretum

The University of Guelph Arboretum is an arboretum organized by the University of Guelph in Guelph, Ontario. It was formally established in 1970 by the university and aims to conserve biodiversity and connect people with nature through teaching, research, and community outreach. The space is 165 hectares and is open throughout the year.

The arboretum grounds contain 40 collections of woody plants for academic and display purposes, as well as various display gardens, memorial plantings, and facilities.

The University of Guelph Arboretum is a member of the American Public Gardens Association and the Society for Ecological Restoration. Additionally, the Arboretum ArbNet Level 4 accredited.

The Arboretum and University of Guelph sit on Dish with One Spoon territory, treaty lands of the Mississaugas of the Credit, and the Between the Lakes Treaty 3 lands.

It is visited by approximately 100,000 people annually.

== History ==
The first collection of woody plants on campus was started by the Ontario Agricultural College in the 1880s. What is now the Arboretum was part of the “College Farm” and was used for test plot research and education. In 1964, during a period of rapid expansion, the Arboretum Study Committee was created, after several years of proposals and considerations regarding the need for a permanent arboretum on campus. Much of the site under consideration was part of an original 220-hectare land parcel purchased for the Ontario Agricultural College in 1873.

Since Guelph is located in a climatic zone significantly different from other Ontario arboreta in Ottawa (Dominion Arboretum) and Hamilton (Royal Botanical Gardens), it was seen as a site particularly valuable for research endeavours. The area developed into an established Arboretum by the 1980s, and included several specialised research and study areas, including rehabilitation of a gravel pit, woodlots, water features, framework plantings and natural wooded areas. The Arboretum was transferred to the Office of Research upon the completion of the 1986 plan - meant to refine the Arboretum's goals and objectives - and administratively returned to Ontario Agricultural College in 2003.

== Geography and climate ==
The Third Edition of Canada's Plant Hardiness Zones based on 1981 to 2010 data, classifies Guelph as Zone 5b, based on seven variables relevant to plant growth. Guelph lies in the corresponding Extreme Minimum Temperature Zone 5b (-26.1 °C to -23 °C). Both zones are based on the approach used by the United States Department of Agriculture.

The climate in Guelph is classified as Dfb (humid continental, no dry season, warm summer) by the Köppen-Geiger system. The average annual temperature is 7.8 °C, and the average rainfall is 958 mm, with an average of 7-9 rainy days every month.

The Guelph Arboretum is located at 43°32′27″N 80°12′54″W, in close proximity to the confluence of the Speed and Eramosa rivers, and less than a kilometre from Hanlon Creek. The area's geology features sedimentary rock strata of the Silurian and Devonian ages. As a result of repeated glaciations, the rock is covered by a mantle of loose materials called drift which varies from a few inches to several hundred feet in thick. Surface deposits consist of outwash gravels and sands, dominated by grey-brown podzolic soils. The arboretum has 12.5 kilometres of trails over a span of 165 hectares, but they do not extend into the Arboretum's 40-hectare nature reserve, which is south of Stone Road East and not accessible to the public.

== Biodiversity ==
The Arboretum lies within the portion of Guelph at the intersection of several ecosystems such as old growth forests, meadows, and wetlands. The Arboretum possesses a large amount of biodiversity despite its size and location within city limits, as well as the adjacency to the populous University of Guelph main campus.

The structural diversity of the Arboretum allows for a wide array of habitats. Many species have been recorded on the grounds including:

- 287 Fungi and Slime Moulds
- 111 Lichens and Lichen-allied fungi
- 211 Birds
- 11 Amphibians
- 10 Reptiles
- 11 Fish
- 44 Mammals
- 159 Spiders
- 851 Moths
- 53 Butterflies
- 73 Rove Beetles
- 67 Dragonflies and Damselflies
- 60 Non-planted Shrubs, Trees, and Vines
- 187 Wildflowers and other plants

The Arboretum participates in several initiatives with a focus on ecosystem stewardship and conservation, such as:

- A gene bank to maintain genetic diversity of Ontario's endangered woody plants and inform landowners of their presence since 1979, and important today for informing ongoing legislative decisions for conservation. Over 30 species of rare woody plants are archived in the grounds and gene banks at The Arboretum, across both research plots and formal collection areas
- The Elm recovery project since 1998, to combat the toll of Dutch Elm Disease on native elms. The goal of the program is to assist the recovery of white elm from the impacts of the disease by reintroducing genetically diverse populations of disease-tolerant elms to the Ontario landscape.
- Participation in Cornell University's citizen-based Feederwatch program for bird data collection since 1986.
- GIS data collection for the Ontario Tree Atlas Project to boost geographic knowledge of tree species in the province.

== Collections ==
The Arboretum has more than 40 collections of native and introduced species with over 1,700 species of trees and shrubs, as well as many herbaceous species. The collections can vary over time, and there are plans in place for many collections requiring alteration, upgrade, or renewal. Some collections involving larger plants that take longer to mature, such as the World of Trees, are well-developed and have been Arboretum staples for several decades.

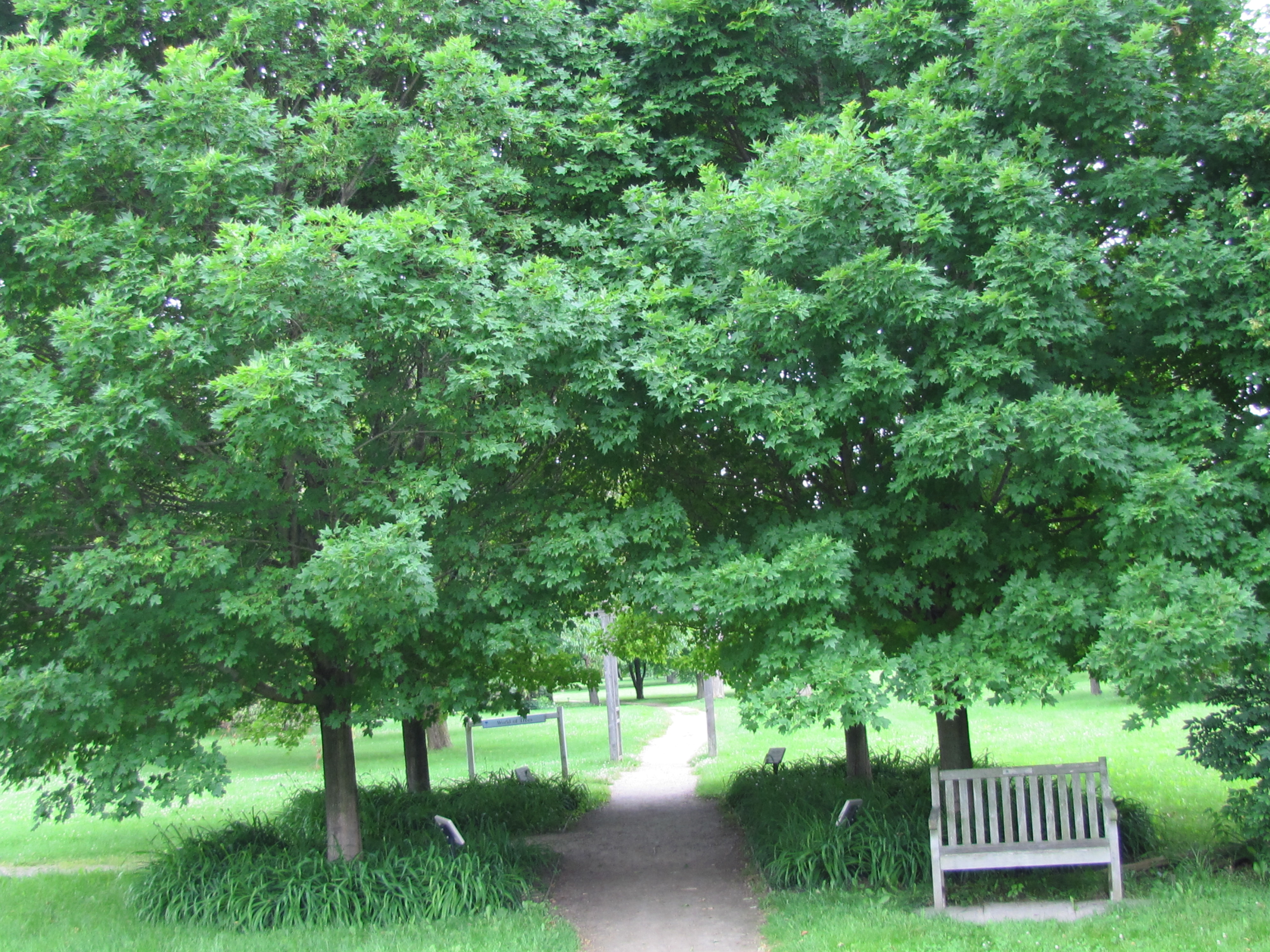
General view of the World of Trees

=== The World of Trees ===
More than 400 species of trees and shrubs representing 158 genera and 67 different plant families are established in this 5-hectare World of Trees collection, the largest collection in the Arboretum by area. They are arranged in family groups situated along both flanks of the majority of the Ivey trail. Many of Ontario's native woody plants (including several rare species) are represented here along with their relatives from Europe or Asia. The World of Trees Collection offers a sampling of diversity found in the world's temperate regions, and is meant to display the wide variety of global tree species' evolutionary adaptations over hundreds of millions of years.

=== Native Trees of Ontario ===
The current Native Trees of Ontario Collection was originally based on a list of some 85 species native to the three forest regions of Ontario; the northern Boreal Forest, the Great lakes - St. Lawrence Forest (in which the Arboretum is found), and the Southern Deciduous Forest. The native species in the collection are those found historically in this region before the arrival of European settlers. Additionally, the collection contains some naturalized trees species that were brought from Europe and Asia by settlers and have invaded natural areas so as to now be found in many parts of the province. The original list was enhanced to include all species covered by the Tree Atlas project, and now includes 4 native woody plant species discovered in the last 30 years, as well as more than 35 exotic woody plant species naturalized in Ontario. A round trail winds around the perimeter of the collection, situated near the intersection of the World of Trees collection and the cultural gardens.

=== Rosaceae Collection ===
The Rosaceae collection represents a large family that spans from roses to crab apples to service berries. This collection includes the Frances Ball Rose Collection. This section of the ground began a multi-year renewal in 2022.

== Gardens ==
The Garden Project was initiated in 1995 with the development of the David G. Porter Memorial Japanese Garden. Two additional cultural and traditional gardens, the Italian Garden and the Edna and Frank C. Miller English Garden, have been developed at the University of Guelph Arboretum. The cultural gardens display classical garden forms. The Arboretum also has environmental demonstration gardens, such as the Gosling Wildlife Gardens, to demonstrate ecologically friendly methods and plant types for use in private home grounds or other landscapes. All of the Arboretum's gardens are important teaching areas as well as a foundation for research in various disciplines.

=== Gosling Wildlife Gardens ===
The Gosling Wildlife Gardens collection a six-garden plant collection supported by the Gosling Foundation since its inception in 1987, that displays a large variety of woody plants, fruit, grasses, herbs, perennials, and more. The six gardens provide food and various habitats for an array of wildlife, and promote positive human-nature interaction. Though several gardens have changed thematically and expanded over time, their designs retain an emphasis on approximating the size of urban/suburban backyards, which inspires visitors to attempt similar plantings at their homes.

Currently there are six gardens: the Entrance Alvar garden, the Enhanced Lawn garden, the Permaculture garden, the Pollinator garden, the Native Plant garden, and the Collector's garden. The guiding principle of these gardens is to "educate, connect, and inspire visitors".

As of 2023, the Gosling Wildlife Gardens are undergoing a multi-year revitalization project, featuring updates to the themes, plant collections, ponds, and other garden features.

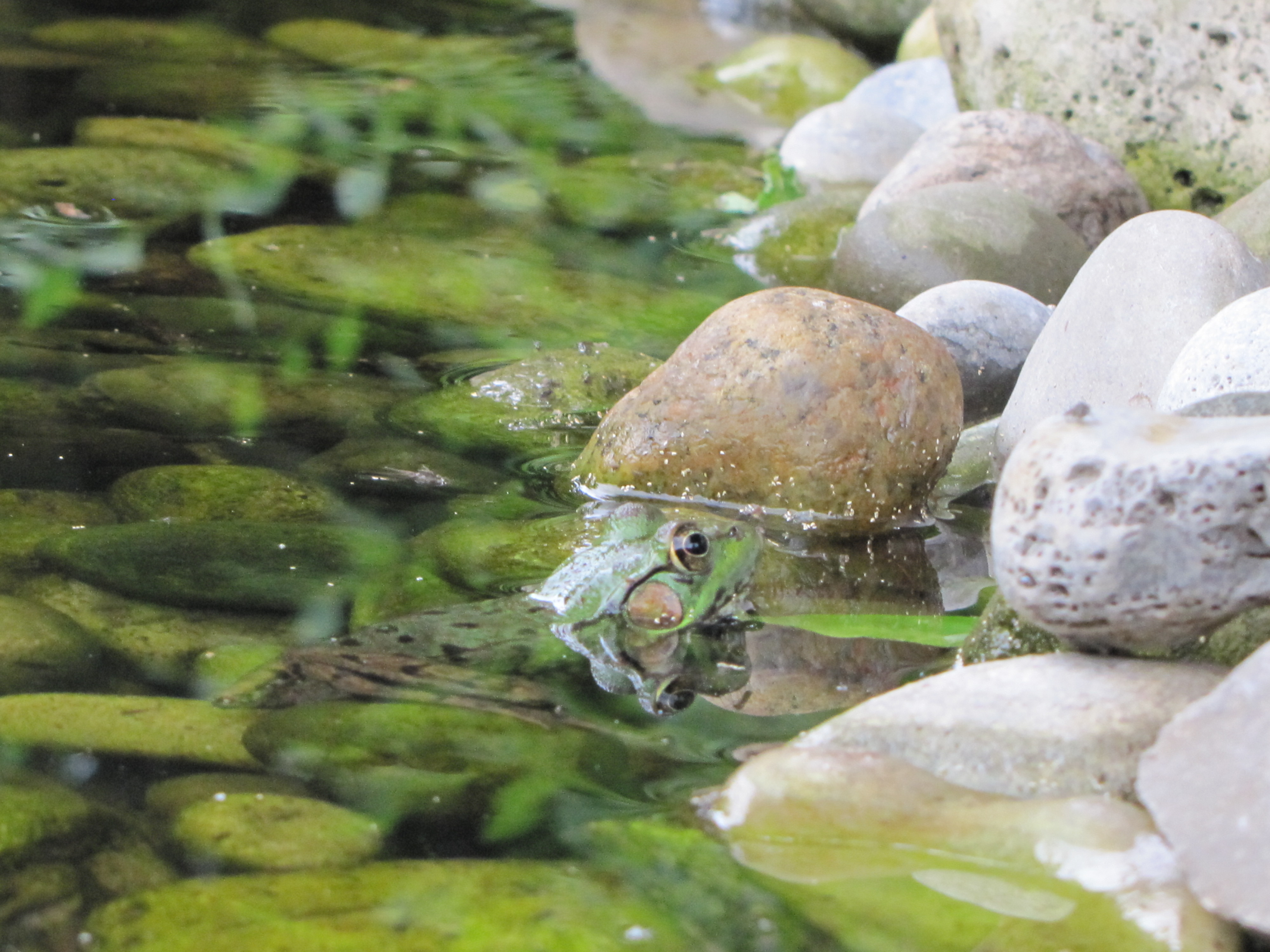
The reflecting pond in the Japanese Garden

=== David G. Porter Memorial Japanese Garden ===
The Japanese Garden was dedicated to the memory of David Porter in June 1995, by his wife Bobbi Porter. It was designed by landscape architect Christopher Campbell, who described it as "the great within the small". The garden contains woody and herbaceous plants that follow a specific Japanese theme, tailored with similar alternative species that find a southern Ontario climate suitable, and contains over 40 different species. Through beds of woolly thyme, the salutation gateway greets visitors. A Shou Sugi Ban fence has replaced the original Kenninji-Gaki bamboo fence, and a stone bridge takes visitors across a pool of water overlooked by vibrant red Japanese maples. Beyond the bridge is a small reflective teahouse structure designed to hold a tea ceremony called cha-no-yu. Across from the structure is a dry zen rock garden with decorative raked stones.

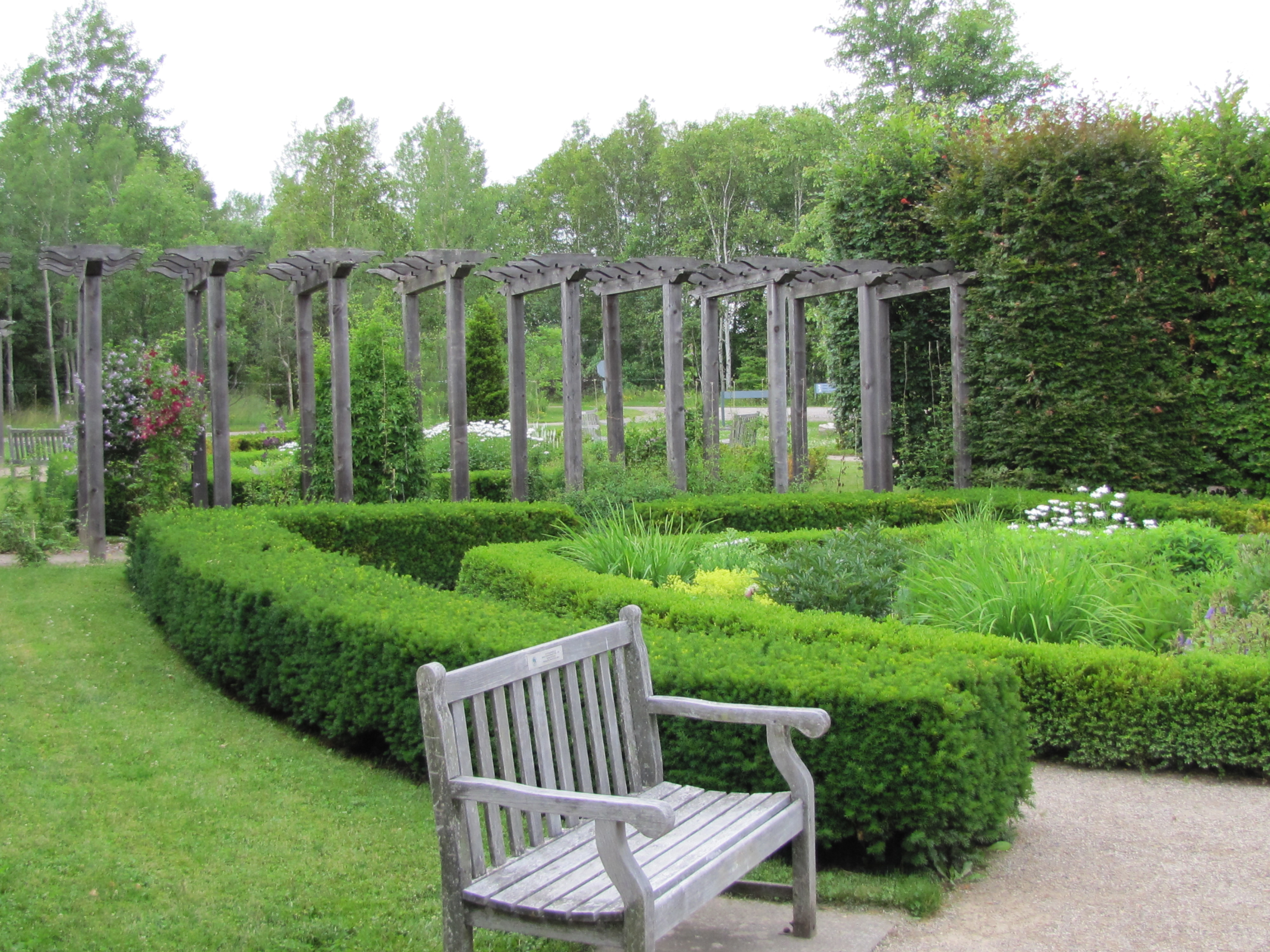
Part of the English Garden

=== Edna and Frank C. Miller English Garden ===
The English Garden was dedicated in the memory of Edna and Frank Miller in September 1998, by their son Frank Miller. This garden demonstrates an English cottage gardening style. The garden includes a tall sheared European beech, hedge maple and white cedar hedge forming a symmetrical pattern of walls. Boxwood hedges circle two gardens: The Nancy and Dr. Anthony Caspers Perennial Gardens, while yew hedges outline the walkway around them Each perennial garden is packed with more than 30 flower species, combining to form a diverse medley of aroma and colour, and is therefore popular with pollinators.

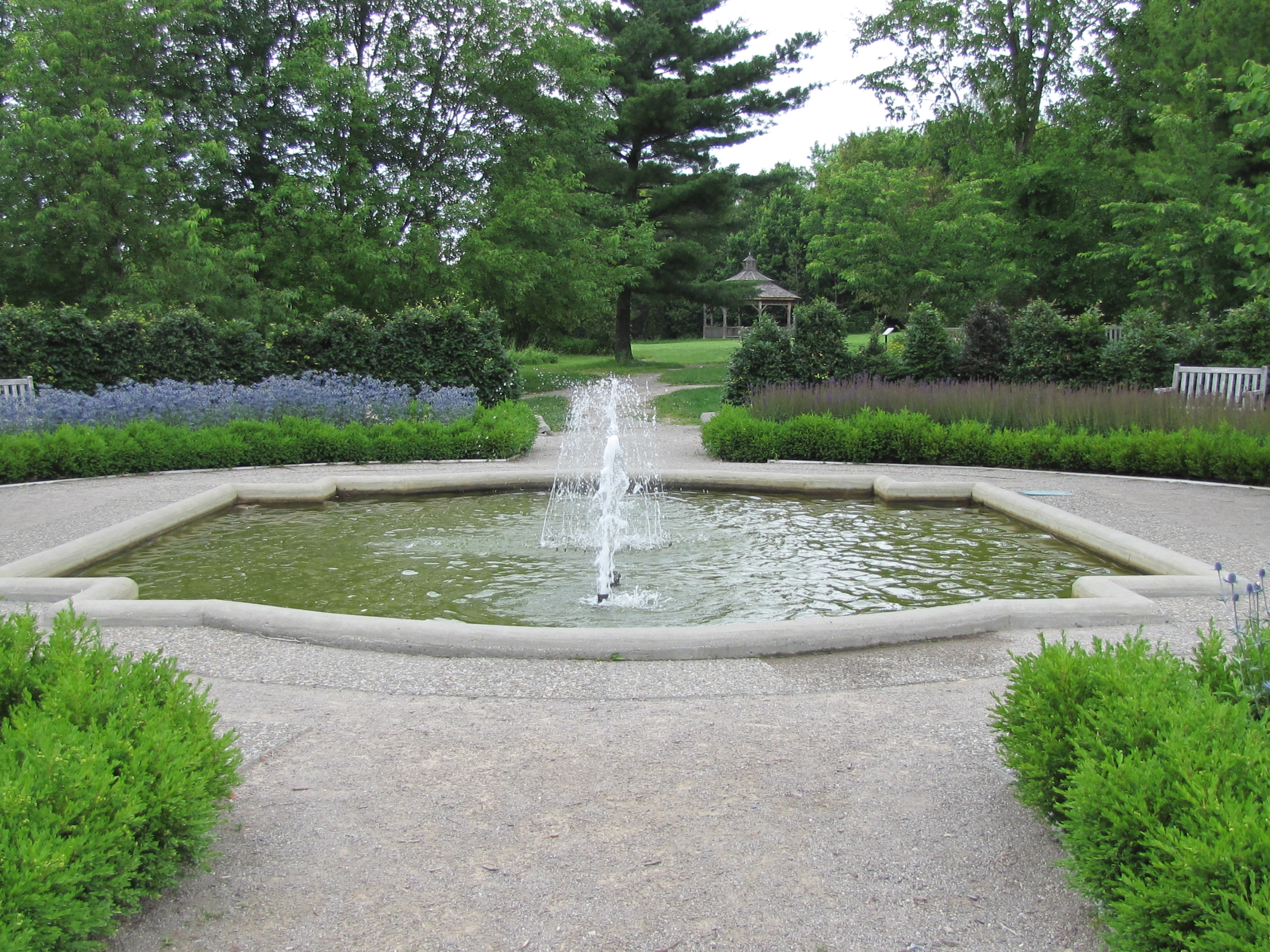
Fountain in the Italian Garden

=== The Italian Garden ===
The Italian Garden is formally structured with a strong principal axis oriented north-south and draws its inspiration from famous Italian Renaissance gardens such as those at the Villa Medici in Rome, Villa d'Este in Tivoli, Villa Lante in Bagnaia, Villa Aldobrandini in Frascati, and Villa Farnese in Caprarola. A view of a Rivers Purple Beech planted within the OAC '56 Park in The Garden is framed in the south opening of the sheared European beech hedge which encloses and defines the garden. Nestled within this hedge are classical statues and garden benches. At the center of the garden is a formal pool with fountain jets, edged by pebble inlaid pavers. Between the central pool and the tall beech hedge, are a ring of boxwood-edged flowerbeds containing lavender and sage species, accented by four European hornbeams. This garden's composition emphasizes balance and organized geometry.

=== The OAC'56 Park in the Garden ===
The OAC '56 Park in The Garden is a large lawn shaded by 20 specimen trees framed with a path, benches, and verge plantings. These trees were chosen for their form and leaf colour/texture. Their stately appearance helps provide The Park with an atmosphere suited to leisure. The Park in the Garden contains the Japanese, English, and Italian gardens listed above, interesting vistas, and paths connecting the areas. The garden's design is based on the late 19th-century idea of large, open public space as defined by the designer Frederick Law Olmsted.

== Features and facilities ==
=== Natural areas ===
==== Victoria Woods ====
Victoria Woods is an old-growth hardwood forest made up of sugar maple, white ash, black cherry and beech. Varied topography in this area, which includes a pond, allows for a wide variety of woodland plants to grow here. Spring is an especially nice time to visit Victoria Woods to see many of these spring ephemeral plants blooming. High moisture content in this woodland's soils make it unsuitable for agriculture, which is a reason why its trees have never been cut.

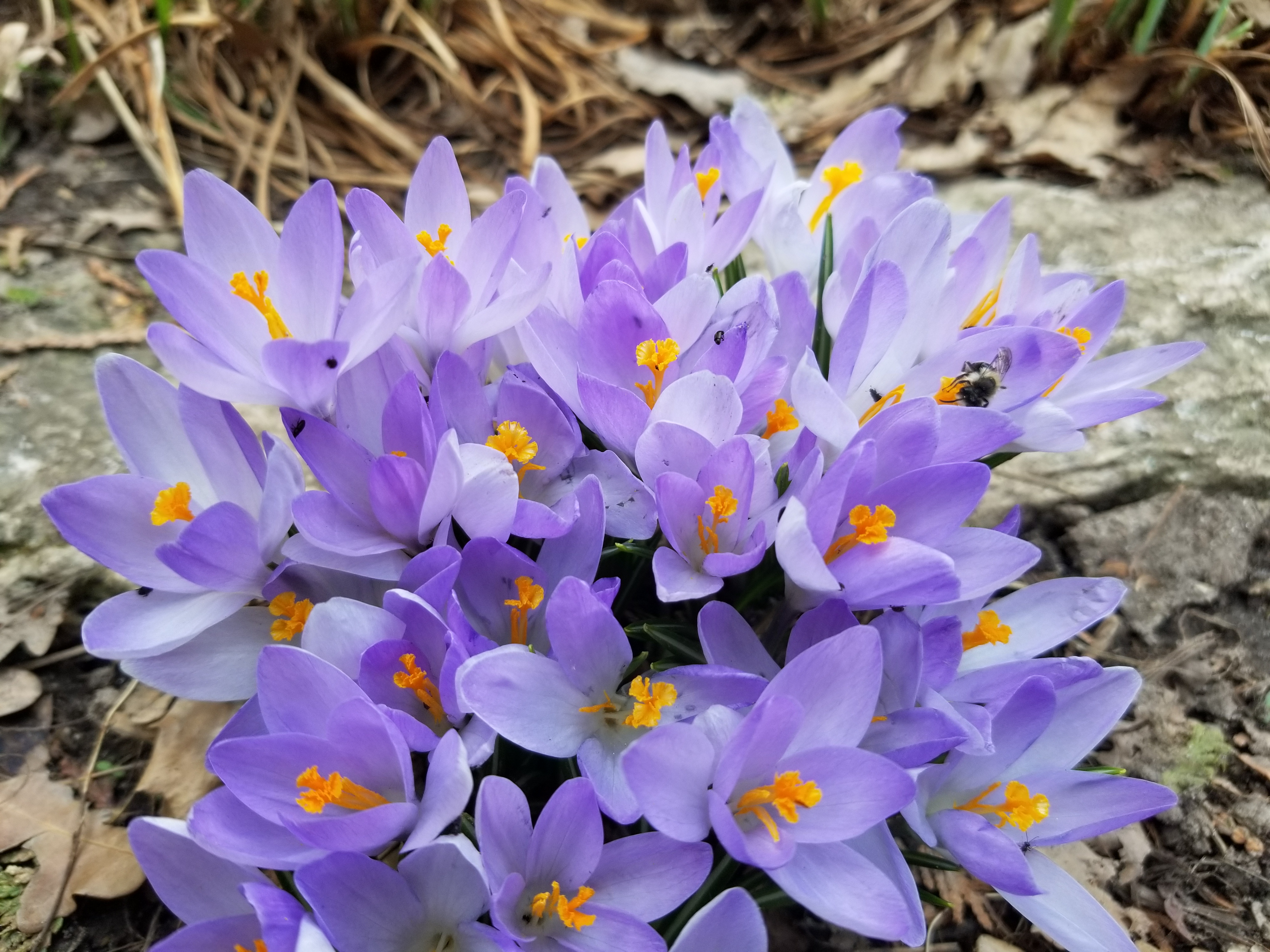
Crocuses adorned with insects in spring on the Wild Goose trail

==== Wild Goose Woods ====
Part of Wild Goose Woods is another old growth forest, and was once a White elm forest, with some of the stumps still present from the large trees that were wiped out by Dutch Elm Disease in the late 1960's. When the large elms died, small Freeman's maples that covered the forest floor got their chance and grew to the present forest around the boardwalk. In the late summer, fall and early winter, this area can be fairly dry, but in the late winter and spring, it is completely underwater

==== The Wall-Custance Memorial Forest ====
The Wall-Custance Memorial Forest is linked to the Wall-Custance Funeral Home and Chapel in Guelph. The Memorial Forest Trail (1.4 km) runs through this forest, parallel to the Ivey Trail, but farther to the northwest, and leads to the Ontario Horticultural Association Oak Grove. For each donation to the Wall-Custance Memorial Forest Program, a tree or shrub is planted in the Memorial Forest in either spring or fall, and since 1989, over 8500 trees and shrubs have been planted under the auspices of this program in memory of loved ones.

=== Facilities ===
==== OAC Centennial Arboretum Centre ====
The OAC Centennial Arboretum Centre was opened in 1974 to mark the 100th anniversary of the Ontario Agricultural College, and is the administrative headquarters of The Arboretum. Staying true to the vision of The Arboretum, Architect Raymond Moriyama designed The Arboretum Centre to blend into its surroundings to allow visitors' attention to be drawn to nature. The OAC Centennial Arboretum Centre is a multi-use venue for events such as meetings, trade shows, conferences, weddings, anniversaries, fundraising events, banquets and fashion shows.

==== J.C. Taylor Nature Centre ====
Opened in 1978, the J.C. Taylor Nature Centre is the site where school children have learned about topics such as maple syrup, insects, pond life, wildlife gardening, feeder birds and forest habitats. Initially it was designed as a sugar shack and equipped with a maple syrup evaporator. It now houses classes and adult workshops.

==== R. J. Hilton Centre ====
The original structure was the Harrison Barn, part of the Ontario Agricultural College's research farm. The Harrison Barn resided on Arboretum grounds and was one of the first buildings used by Arboretum staff. In the early 1970s, the barn was demolished to build the Service Centre on its foundation, and was re-named in the 1980s in honour of inaugural director, Dr. R.J. Hilton's contributions to The Arboretum. Today, the R.J. Hilton Centre continues to serve as a hub for Arboretum horticultural staff, propagation greenhouse and nursery facilities.

=== Trails ===
==== Ivey Trail ====
The 1.1 km Ivey Trail is distinguished by white “IVEY” on the trail posts. It begins at the pedestrian entrance to The Arboretum and ends at the J.C. Taylor Nature Centre. Ivey trail features access to most of The Arboretum's other trail systems because it runs along the centre of The Arboretum, bisecting most of the area.

==== Trillium Trail ====
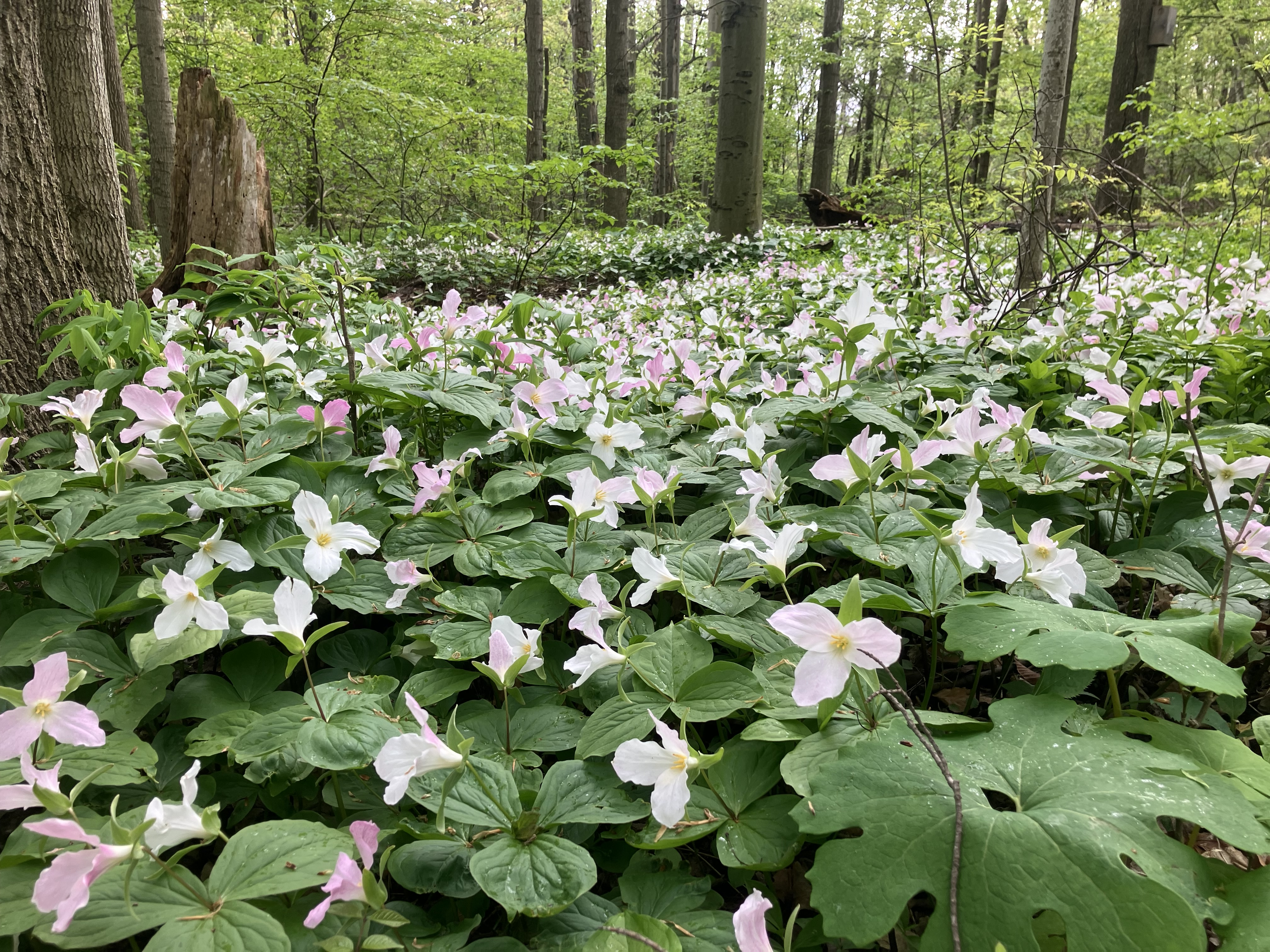
Trillium grandiflorum on the Trillium trail

The Trillium Trail is a 2.0 km loop that passes through several plant collections and crosses many other Arboretum trails. This trail encircles the Maple collection, the Rotary Tree Grove, much of the World of Trees collection, the three cultural gardens, and the OAC Centennial Arboretum Centre. The trail is even accessible in the winter for cross-country skiers.

==== Acorn Trail ====
The Acorn Trail is the only major trail along the portion of the Arboretum northwest of College Avenue. It passes by the R.J. Hilton Centre, forming a figure-eight encircling the Linden collection and the Beech and Oak collection.

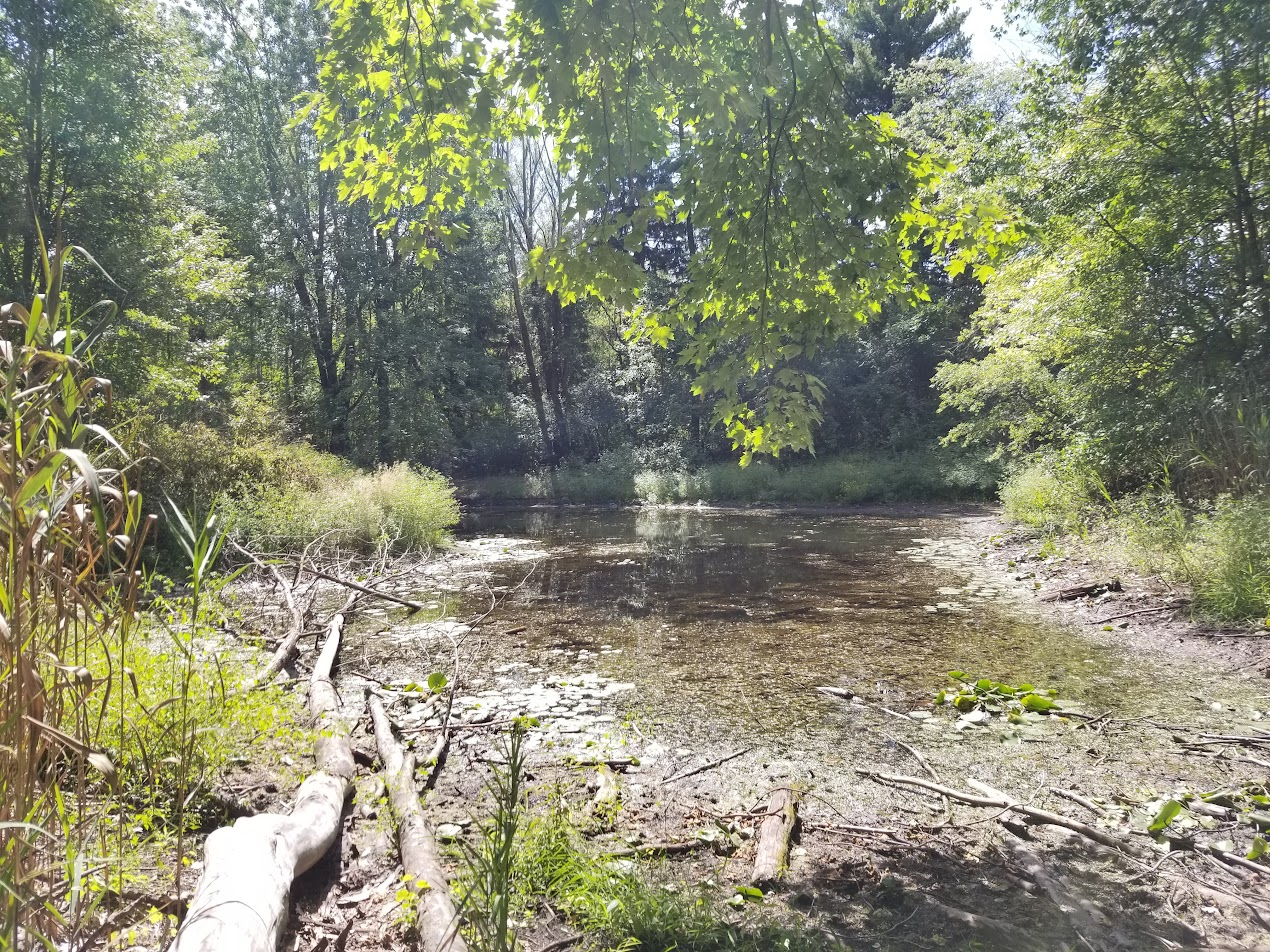
Victoria Woods Pond in September

==== Col. John McCrae Trail ====
This trail connects Wild Goose Woods and Victoria Woods, passing through the Gravel Pit Rehabilitation Collection and along a century-old hedgerow.

==== Wild Goose trail ====
The Wild Goose trail consists of 1.5 km of boardwalks and dirt paths that meander through areas of marsh, forest, and swamp habitat.

==== The Victoria Woods trail ====
This circular trail meanders through the old-growth maple-beech forest of Victoria Woods and beside the Victoria Woods pond.

== Offers ==
The Arboretum, administered through the Ontario Agricultural College at the University of Guelph, provides a variety of programs and workshops year-round and serves as a significant visitor attraction for the citizens of Guelph and Ontario.

=== Walks and tours ===
The Arboretum offers group walks led by Arboretum Auxiliary Docents, primarily in the summer. There are interpretative tours which are led by Arboretum staff as well. These tour includes interpretations of the use of plants for horticultural or naturalization plantings.

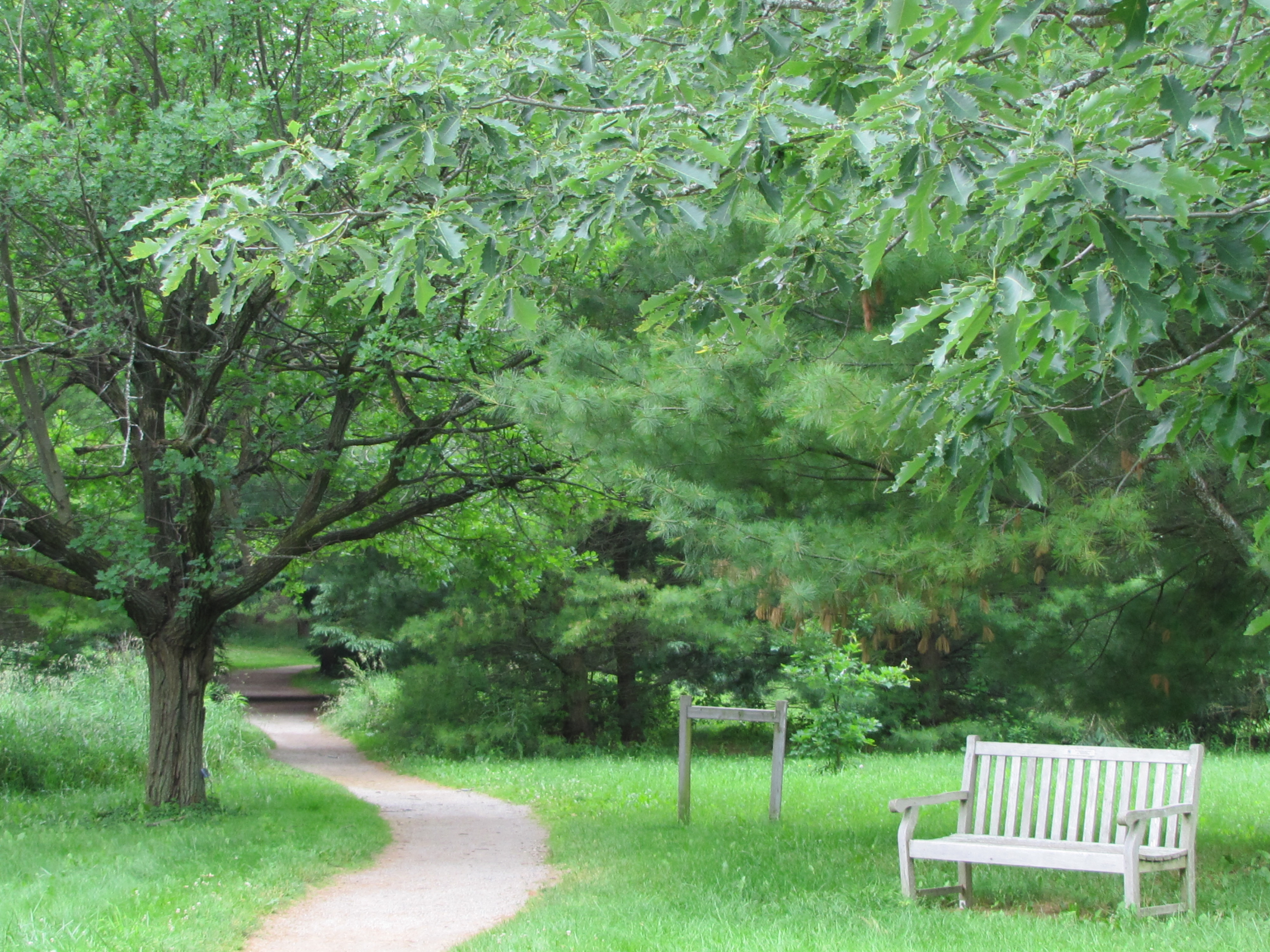
Part of the Ivey Trail

=== Workshops ===
There are workshops available which include topics on owls, mushrooms, shrubs, sketching nature, wildflower photography and garden design.

=== Donation and Dedication ===
A popular program is the Wall Custance Memorial Forest tree dedication. Donations are made to commemorate a life by having a tree planted into Memorial Forest. Individuals can also sponsor Century Pines and Spruces that were planted in 1907 by Canada's father of forestry, Edmund Zavitz.

== See also ==
- List of botanical gardens in Canada
