= Darts Hill Garden Park =

Canadian public garden

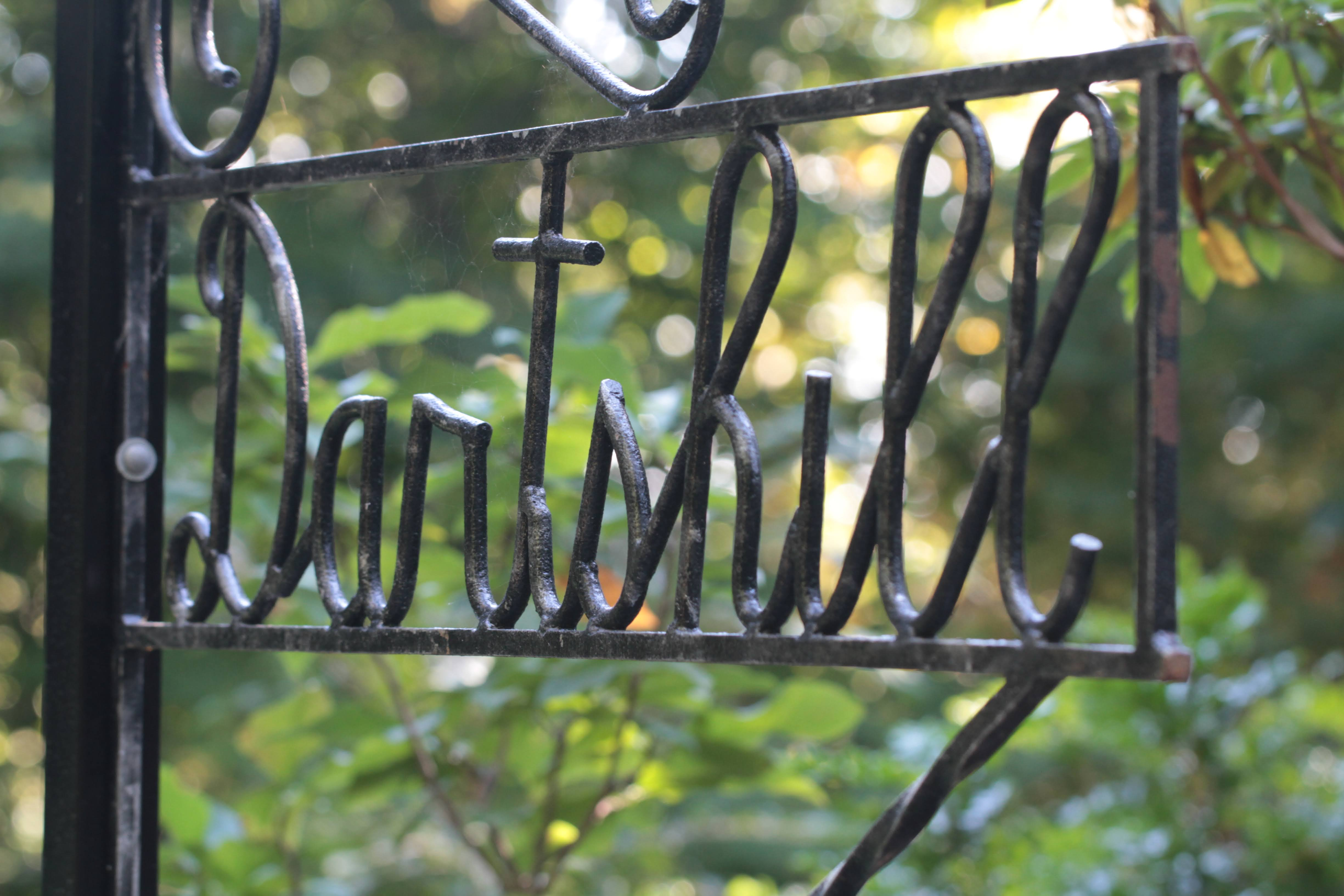
- Entrance Sign to Darts Hill Garden Park

- Location within Greater Vancouver Regional District
- Interactive map of Darts Hill Garden Park
- Type: Plantsman's Garden
- Location: South Surrey, BC
- Coordinates: 49°1′54″N 122°45′9″W
- Area: 22.5 acres (9.1 ha)
- Website: dartshill.ca

Darts Hill Garden Park is a public garden situated within a property located at 1633-170th Street in South Surrey, near the town of White Rock. It is in the City of Surrey, BC, Canada.

Public entry is currently by donation to the volunteer trust that helps maintain the garden in line with the wishes of the original donor - Francisca Darts. Opening days are generally Friday to Sunday, April to the end of September. Hours on those days are normally from 10:00 am to 4:00 pm. It is additionally open to members on special "members only" occasions; the garden is closed to the public between October and March.

Admission is by donation when the garden is open to visitors. Annual membership is available for purchase at $25 per person.

== History ==
In 1943, Francisca and Edwin Darts bought a rough, stump-covered acreage in Surrey, BC which they turned into an orchard. The orchard initially had apple, pear, apricot, peach, plum, medlar, walnut, and filbert trees. This orchard later won Edwin Darts a gold medal by the Pacific National Exhibition. Driven mainly by Francisca's vision, it was gradually turned into a garden specializing in rare and unusual plants - a so-called "plantsman's garden" - which has now resulted in one of the most diverse collections of mature trees, shrubs, and perennials in western Canada, set out in over 60 labeled garden beds.

In 1994, Edwin and Francisca Darts donated their 7.5-acre garden to the City of Surrey which then extended the total area to 22.5 acres for its citizens to enjoy. The Darts also provided an endowment for its ongoing maintenance. The non-profit Darts Hill Garden Conservancy Trust Society works in partnership with the City of Surrey towards these goals.

== See also ==
- List of botanical gardens in Canada
