= Fanshawe College Arboretum =

Botanical garden in Canada

The Gardens of Fanshawe College were started in 1995 when St. Paul's Cathedral was looking for land within London, Ontario to create a memorial garden of tree plantings in the names of deceased Londoners. They approached Fanshawe College after locating a large expanse of vacant land in the area. Subsequently, after discussions concerning upkeep and possible vandalism, Fanshawe set aside an area now known as Woodland Gardens in 1995. An organized and accessioned garden was begun after this time and the Spriet Family Greenhouse was added to the Horticulture Technician Program. The gardens have now evolved into The Gardens of Fanshawe College which also include The A. M. Mac Cuddy Gardens, some forty minutes west of London north of the town of Strathroy.

Today the gardens boast a collection of over 4,000 species of plants at the two locations and is one of the most important collections in southwestern Ontario. Both gardens and the collections are managed and maintained by staff and students in the horticulture technician program, where a substantial portion of their learning is spent in the gardens.

The gardens are managed using BG Base software and are members of the Botanic Gardens Conservation International, The Royal Horticultural Society and the American Public Gardens Association.

== Locations ==
- Gardens of Fanshawe College
- A.M. (Mac) Cuddy Gardens: 42.97638°N 81.63204°W

== See also ==
- List of botanical gardens in Canada
