= Triodetic dome =

Type of geodesic structure

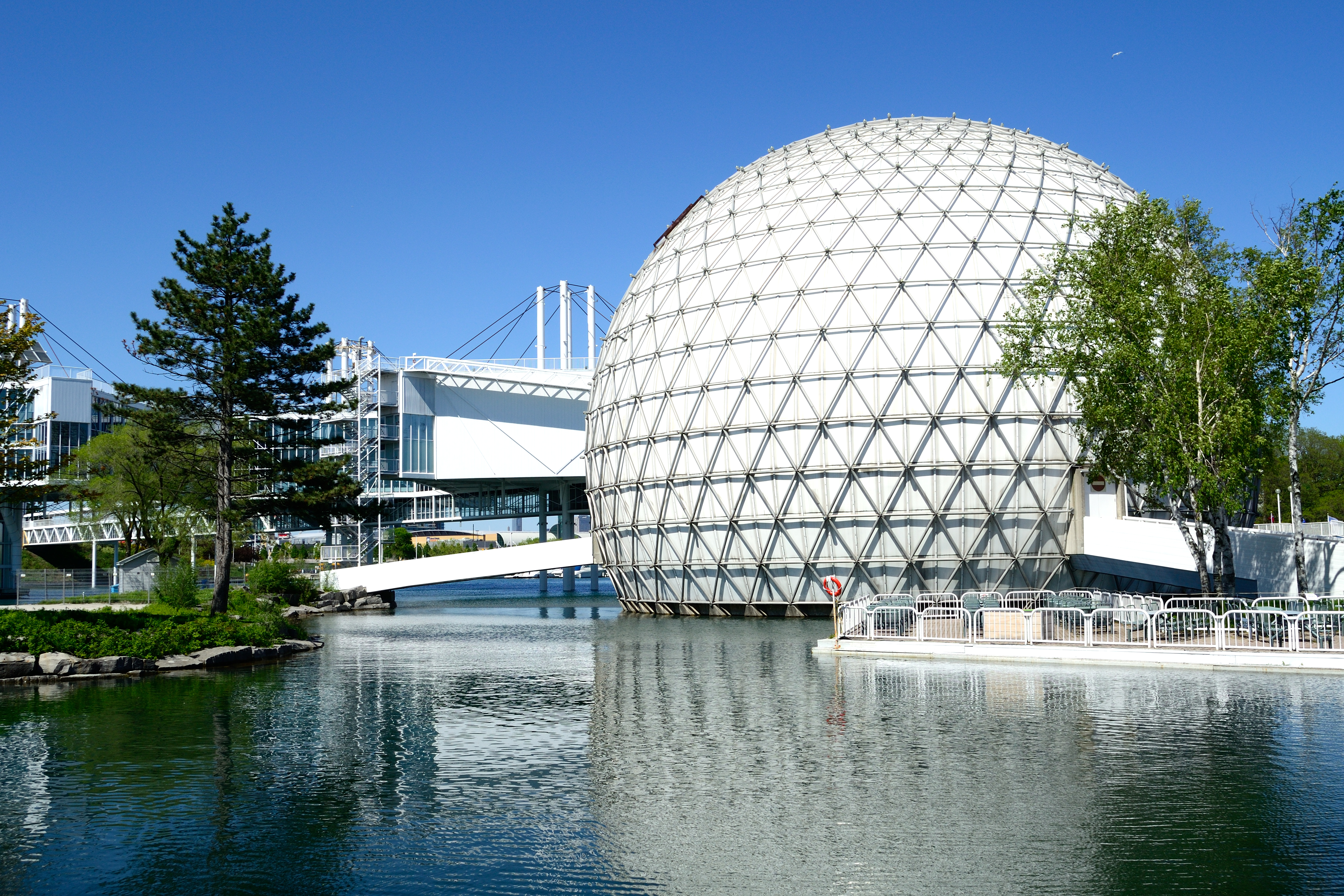
Cinesphere, an example of a Triodetic dome

A Triodetic dome is a type of geodesic dome whose space frame is constructed using Triodetic connectors, invented in 1955 by Canadian architect Arthur E. Fentiman.

== History ==
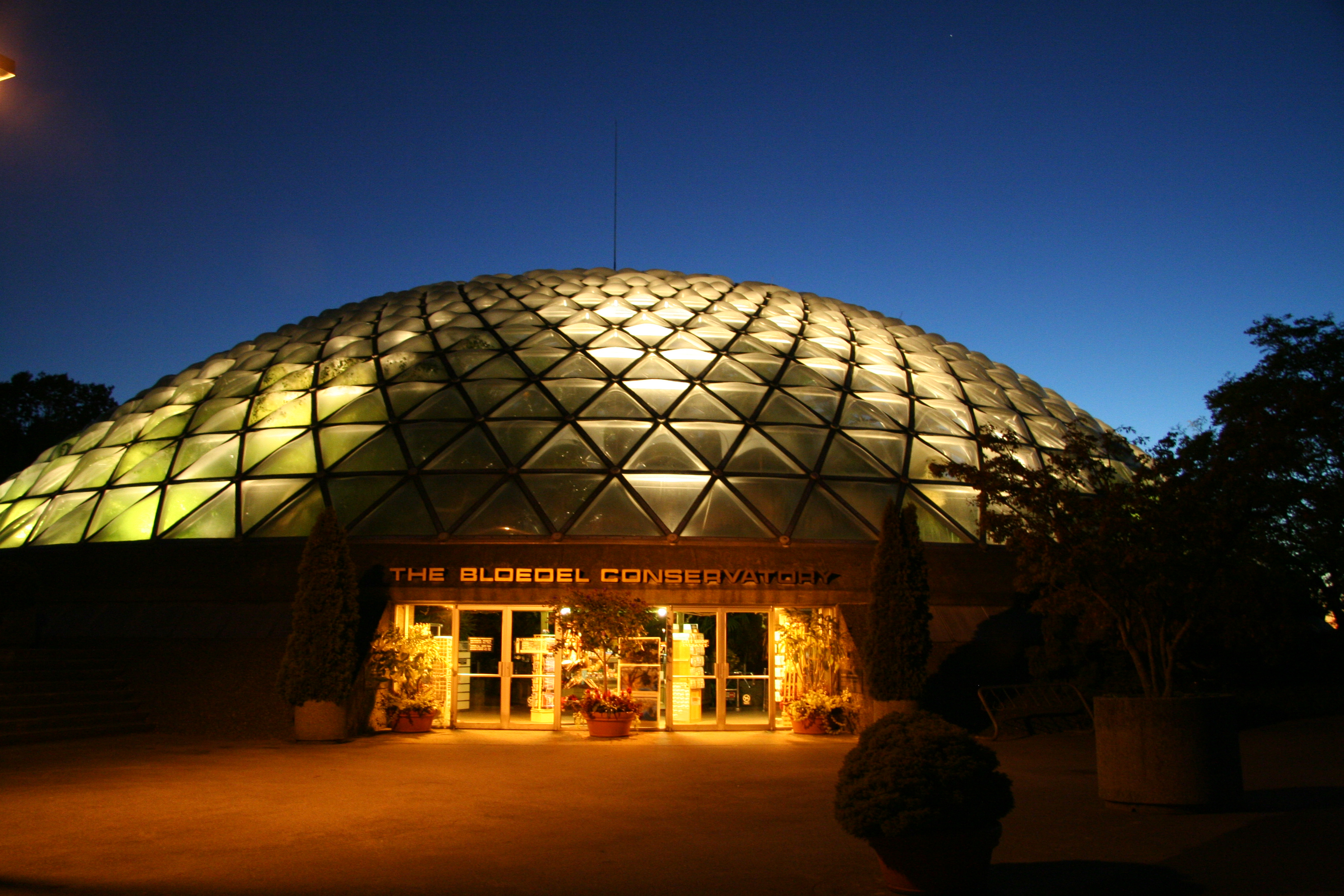
Bloedel Floral Conservatory, one of the earliest Triodetic domes

Triodetic connectors were invented in 1955 by Canadian architect Arthur E. Fentiman (1918–1993), and patented in 1958. The system was developed further by A. E. Fentiman's brother, Harold Gordon ("Bud") Fentiman (1921–1986) and was in commercial use by 1960. Triodetic Structures Ltd was established in 1962 to market the system; the Fentiman family sold the company in 1977.

== Description ==
The connector consists of a hub, usually of aluminium, with up to twelve slots into which tubes (the axial members) can be inserted. The assemblage is stabilized by a central bolt with a washer (through the middle of the hub). It is generally used with aluminium tubes, but stainless steel was introduced in 1966. The tubes do not require bolting or welding together, and the frame can be put together by non-specialists using basic equipment.

Various shapes in addition to domes are possible, including barrel vaults, pyramids and hyperbolic paraboloids. Recent applications of the system have included as foundations for building, which can function on permafrost.

== Examples of Triodetic structures ==
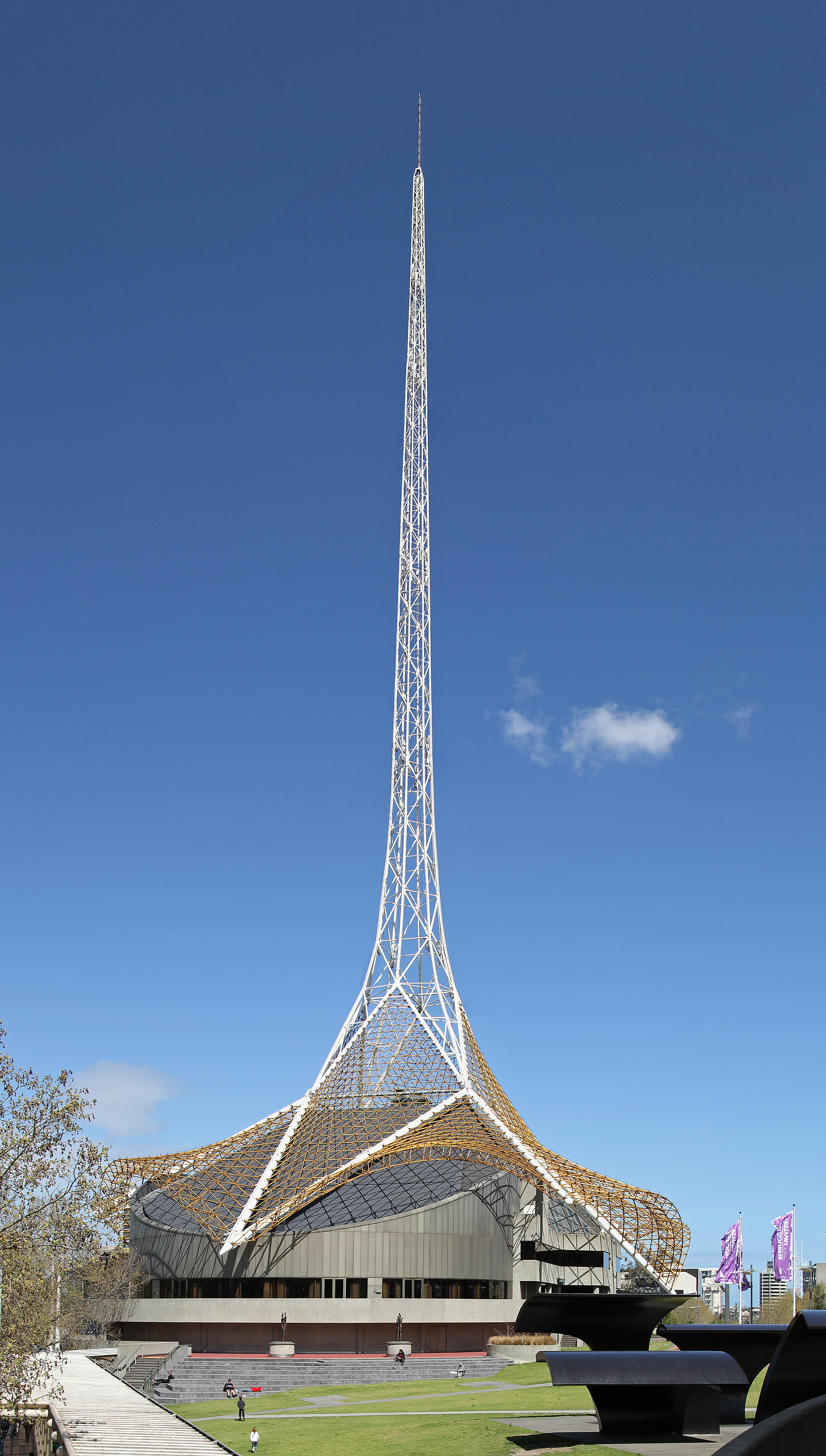
Arts Centre Melbourne

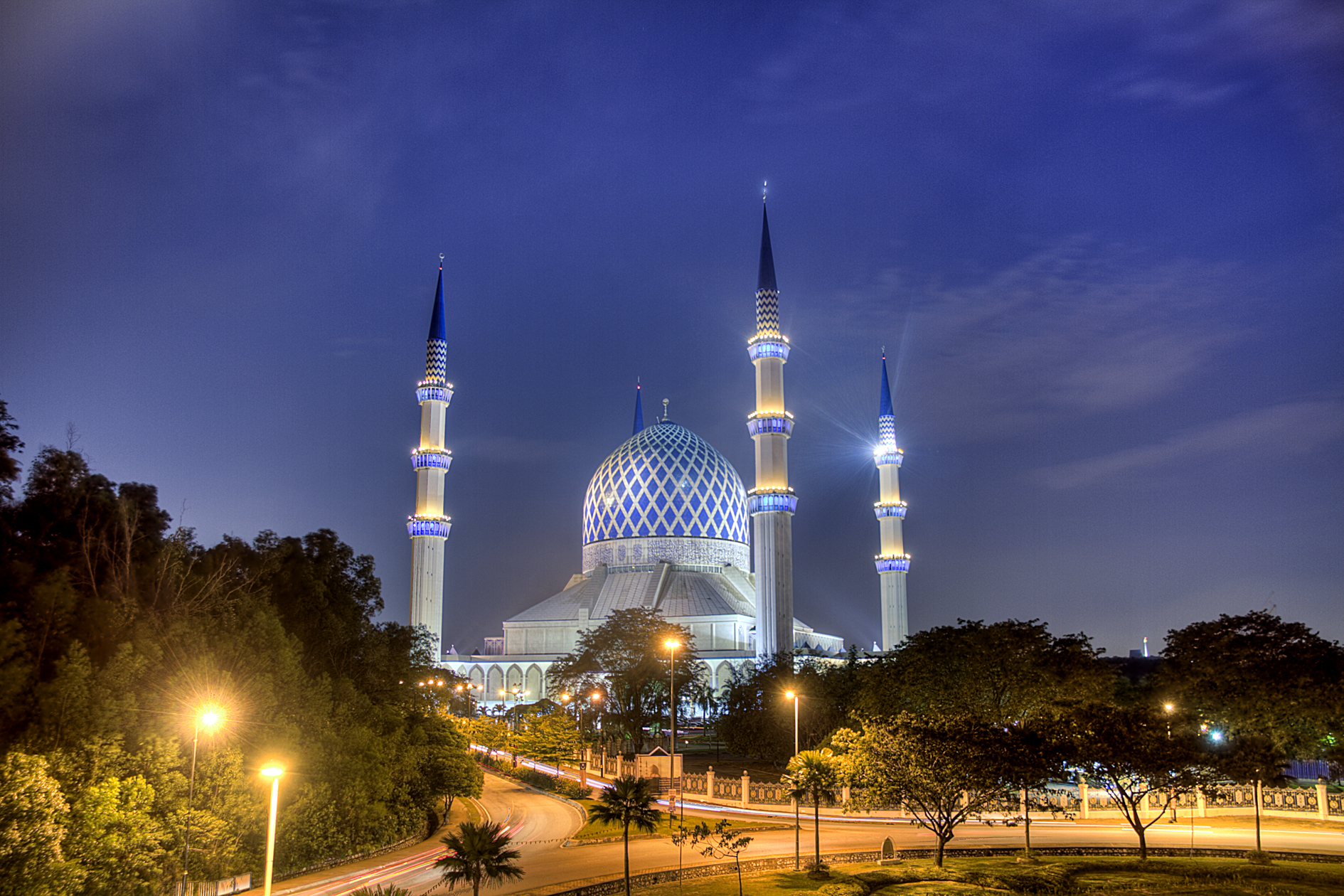
Blue Mosque

Canada

- Netherlands pavilion at Expo 67, Montreal, designed by Walter Eykelenboom (1967)
- Bloedel Floral Conservatory, Vancouver, British Columbia (1968)
- Rainbow Stage, Winnipeg, Manitoba (1970)
- Cinesphere, Toronto, Ontario (1971)
- Research hut on Mount Logan, Yukon (1977)
- Metro Toronto Zoo pavilions (1972)
- Niagara Falls Marineland (1974)
- Royal Tyrrell Museum of Palaeontology greenhouse, Drumheller, Alberta (1985)
- Holy Trinity Greek Orthodox Church, London, Ontario (2000)

United States

- Pavilion of John Fitzgerald Kennedy Library, Boston, designed by I. M. Pei (1979)
- Turtle Dome (Strongheart Recreation Center), Grand Traverse, Michigan (c. 2001)
- Liberace Museum extension, Las Vegas (2002)
- The Strong National Museum of Play extension, Rochester, New York (2006)

Elsewhere

- Roman Catholic Church of St Joseph, Wool, Dorset, England (1969–71)
- Royal Botanic Garden plant house, Sydney, Australia (1974)
- Arts Centre Melbourne spire, designed by Roy Grounds (1980)
- Blue Mosque, Shah Alam, Malaysia (1988)
- Airport terminal, Havana, Cuba (1995)
- Canadian embassy, Cairo (2002)

== See also ==
- Geodesic dome
- Gridshell
- Shell (structure)
- Truss
