= Canadian Western Agribition =

Annual agriculture trade show in Saskatchewan

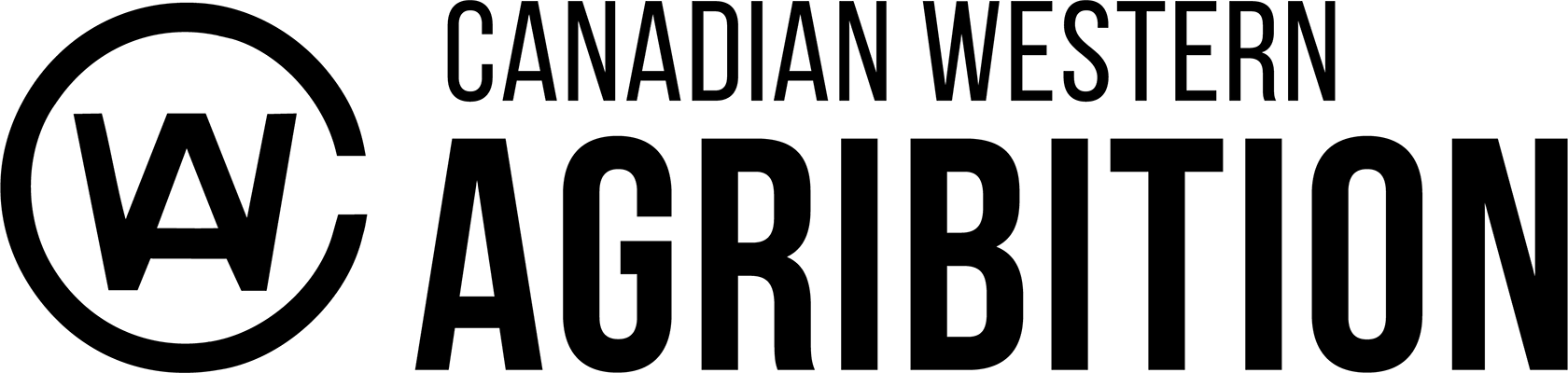
- Genre: Winter agricultural show
- Date: November
- Frequency: Annual
- Locations: REAL District; Regina, Saskatchewan
- Years active: 55
- Website: www.agribition.com

Canadian Western Agribition, otherwise known as simply Agribition, is an annual agricultural trade show held at REAL District in Regina, Saskatchewan, typically held during the last week of November.

== History ==
The first Agribition show was held in Regina from November 30 to December 3, 1971, and has taken place every year since. Chris Sutter of Redvers, Saskatchewan was the first president of Canadian Western Agribition. Bill Small of Craven, Saskatchewan was the show's first vice-president. A book which chronicled the first 29 years of the show, titled Agribition, was published in 1990.

Agribition was to celebrate its 50th year in 2020; it was scheduled to be delayed slightly in order to accommodate the 108th Grey Cup, which was to be hosted by nearby Mosaic Stadium. The event was cancelled and replaced by a virtual event due to the COVID-19 pandemic.

Agribition returned as an in-person event with virtual components in 2021; organizers projected attendance to have been just over 85,000, a decrease from the 121,000 who attended in 2019. Organizers cited COVID-19 protocols (including Saskatchewan's proof of vaccination rules), a lack of school visitors, and reduced international attendance as factors in the decline, but noted that there was increased interest in its online content. The 2022 show was again scheduled later than usual due to the Grey Cup.

== Events ==
Agribition is primarily driven by a wide range of livestock shows, cattle sales, agricultural trade displays and business conferences but other events like rodeo, freestyle bullfighting, and horse pulling also fill in Agribition's daily schedule every year.

Livestock prominently featured at the show include various breeds of cattle such as Simmentals, Red Angus, and Maine-Anjou. Other specialty livestock also participate in Agribition like bison, alpacas and sheep, but on a much smaller scale compared to cattle.

== See also ==
- Agriculture in Saskatchewan
