= REAL District =

Indoor arena in Saskatchewan, Canada

Coordinates: 50.451111°N 104.637094°W

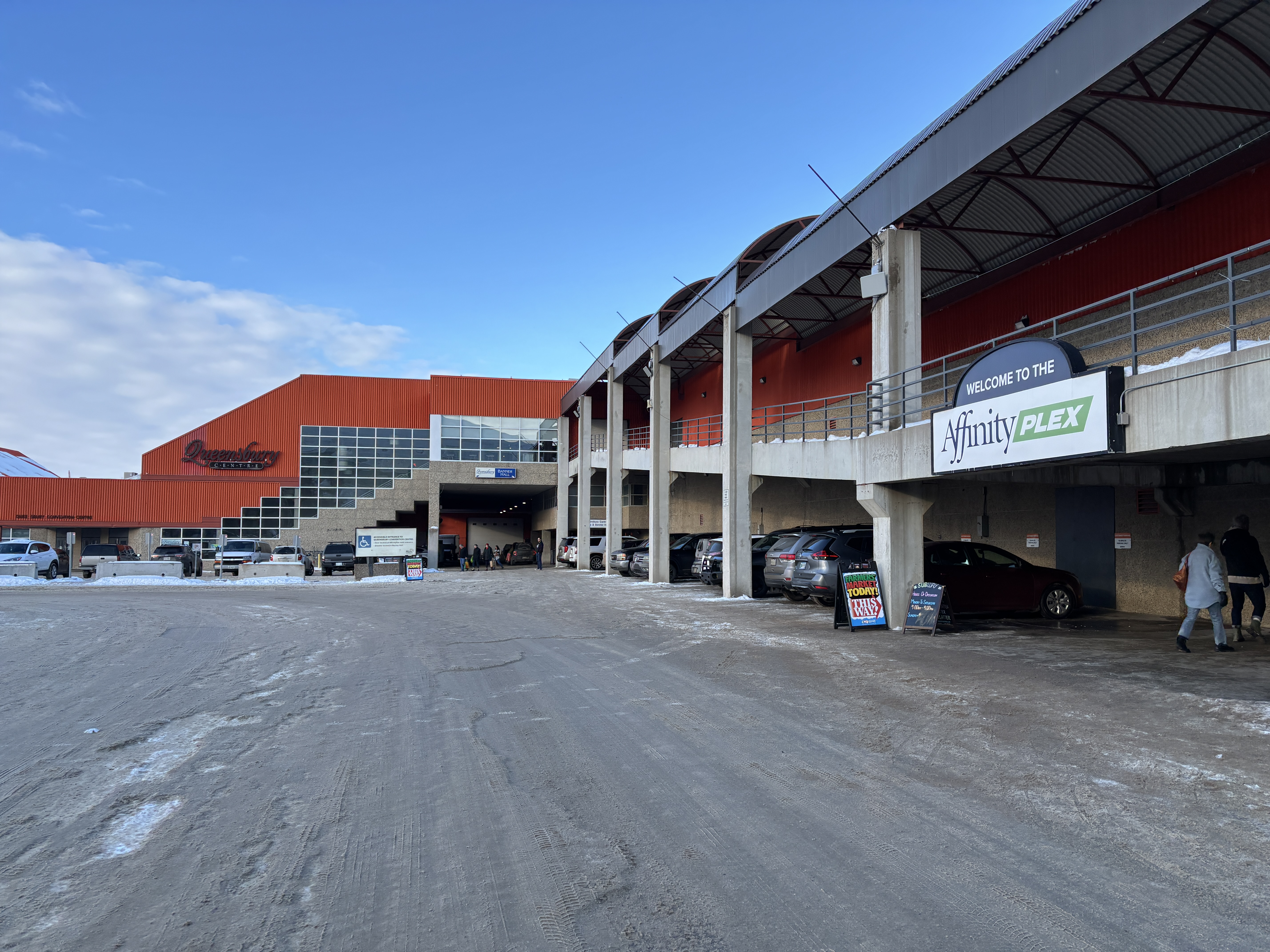
- Interactive map of REAL District
- Former names: Evraz Place (2008-2022); IPSCO Place (2006-2008); Regina Exhibition Park (Before 2006)
- Address: 1700 Elphinstone St. Regina, Saskatchewan; Canada
- Owner: City of Regina
- Operator: Regina Exhibition Association Limited

Tenants
- Saskatchewan Roughriders (Mosaic Stadium); Regina Pats (Brandt Centre); Canadian Western Agribition; Queen City Ex; Canada's Farm Show

Website
- https://realdistrict.ca/

REAL District is a 102-acre (0.41 km2) sport complex and exhibition grounds in Regina, Saskatchewan, operated by the Regina Exhibition Association Limited (REAL). The area is home to Mosaic Stadium, an outdoor stadium and home of the Saskatchewan Roughriders, and Brandt Centre, an indoor arena and home of the Regina Pats. Brandt Centre is connected to an interconnected series of various convention and sports facilities, including the Bunge International Trade Centre, Canada Place, the AffinityPlex (a multi-purpose indoor area that also supports an indoor soccer field. Formerly known as the "EventPlex," but sponsored by Affinity Credit Union since September 2018), the Queensbury Convention Centre (a convention and banquet facility), and The Co-operators Centre, a six-rink hockey facility. The complex is host site of the Queen City Ex, as well as Canadian Western Agribition and Canada's Farm Show.

The Regina Exhibition Stadium, a historic indoor arena constructed in 1919, was demolished in 2017 in order to construct the new International Trade Centre, a $37 million, 150,000 square-feet convention space.

Naming rights to the site were previously held by IPSCO (as IPSCO Place), and British steel company Evraz (as Evraz Place). In March 2022, REAL announced that the site would be renamed "REAL District", in order to place a larger emphasis on REAL's involvement in the facilities, and the individual facilities' naming rights. The association also stated that it had inadvertently received shipments, phone calls, and resumes from entities who thought Evraz Place was a company office. REAL denied that the 2022 Russian invasion of Ukraine was the main impetus for dropping the naming rights (while domiciled in the United Kingdom, the largest shareholder of the company is Russian), as the contract had expired in May 2021, but that it was announced sooner than scheduled due to the crisis. REAL also discussed plans for further expansion, including a new distillery under construction, and plans for a new hotel.

In April 2026, it was announced that the Brandt Group of Companies had made an offer to acquire most of the REAL District property for $6.4 million, including the Brandt Centre, Canada Place, and the Queensbury Convention Centre among other properties. The city will continue to own Mosaic Stadium, The Co-operators Centre, and AffinityPlex, but Brandt will lease the International Trade Centre. It was stated that privatizing these buildings would result in taxpayer savings of $79 million over five years. This agreement will result in a de facto sunsetting of REAL in its current form, with all unionized employees becoming Brandt employees, and Brandt holding the rights to organize Queen City Ex and Agribition. Regina's CFO Daren Anderson stated that this would not necessarily be a dissolution, and that "we might have use for REAL, the organization, in the future again. [..] We will address the organization of REAL at some point in the future
