= Regina Floral Conservatory =

Conservatory in Regina, Saskatchewan, Canada

Coordinates: 50°27′47.83″N 104°36′5.86″W

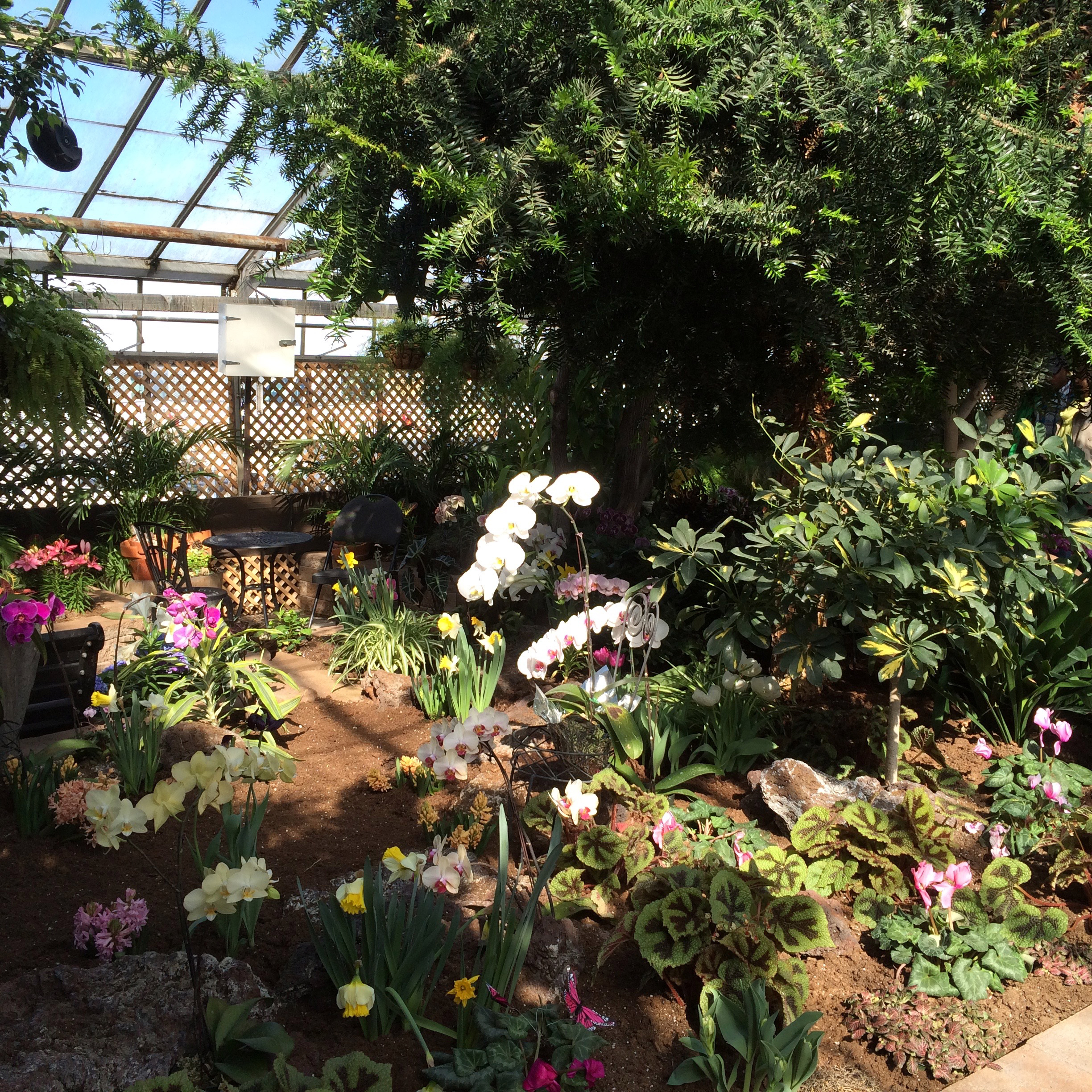

The Regina Floral Conservatory, in Regina, Saskatchewan, Canada, is a conservatory operated by volunteers of the Regina Garden Associates with support from the city of Regina. With tropical plants, trees and blooms, the Conservatory provides a tranquil setting for Regina residents and visitors to the city. Floral displays change regularly and feature seasonal offerings set amid greenery, moist air and the sounds of a waterfall.

The conservatory was founded by the city of Regina during the 1950s as a cluster of three greenhouses which grew plants for the city. A portion of this operation was later opened to the public, so visitors could enjoy an indoor green space. In 1991 a volunteer organization, the Regina Garden Associates (RGA), was formed to operate a small gift shop at the entrance to the public floral display. The city of Regina formed a partnership with the RGA in 1999 to operate and maintain a 315-square-metre (377 sq yd) greenhouse display and oversee special events. The RGA hosts several teas and family days at the conservatory each year and manages the rental of the space for weddings, meetings and other events. In 2002, the greenhouse became known as the Regina Floral Conservatory.

The Conservatory is home to a permanent collection which includes trees, cacti, succulents, tropical plants and orchids. The floral display at the conservatory changes (on a seasonal basis) four to six times per year and includes Christmas, tropical and spring displays (the latter featuring thousands of spring bulbs). The RGA also offers educational programs at the conservatory for children from preschool to grade eight. Children learn about plant needs and parts, plant diversity and adaptations, plants commercially important to humankind, the water cycle and composting.

Located at 1450B Fourth Avenue, the Regina Floral Conservatory is open to the public from 1:00 to 4:30 p.m. seven days a week from September through June (except Christmas Day and New Year's Day). Admission is free, except for special events. Donations are appreciated to help maintain the floral display. The conservatory is wheelchair-accessible and stroller-friendly.
