= TNC =

TNC, tnc, or TnC may refer to:

== Computers ==
- Triangular network coding, a packet coding scheme
- Trusted Network Connect, an open architecture for computer network access control

== Education ==
- Trevecca Nazarene College, now called Trevecca Nazarene University, Nashville, Tennessee, U.S.
- Turkmen National Conservatory, a music conservatory in Ashgabat, Turkmenistan

== Science and medicine ==
- Tenascin C or TN-C, a protein encoded by the TNC gene
- Thymic nurse cells

== Arts, entertainment, and media ==
- Teatre Nacional de Catalunya, a public theatre in Barcelona, Catalonia, Spain
- National Theatre Craiova, a public theatre in Craiova, Romania
- Television Nishinippon Corporation, a TV station in Fukuoka, Japan
- Telenovela Channel, a telenovela-based cable channel in the Philippines
- The New Criterion, a monthly literary magazine based in New York City, New York, U.S.
- Theater for the New City, New York City, New York, U.S.

== Other uses ==
- Terminal node controller, a device used by amateur radio operators
- The Nature Conservancy, an environmental organization headquartered in Arlington, Virginia, U.S.
- The Negotiation Challenge, an annual international negotiation competition
- TNC connector, a type of coaxial cable connector
- Toronto Neighbourhood Centres
- Transnational corporation, corporations that identify with more than one country
- Transportation network company, a legal term for a ridesharing company in certain jurisdictions
- Tripartite Naval Commission, a 1945 naval commission formed to allocate seized German ships and submarines
- Tanimuca-Retuarã language, an ISO 639-3 language code
- Team and Concepts (TnC), a Hong Kong–based company that produced the online spreadsheet EditGrid
- Terms and conditions (T&C)
