= Riverdale, Toronto =

Riverdale
- Neighbourhood
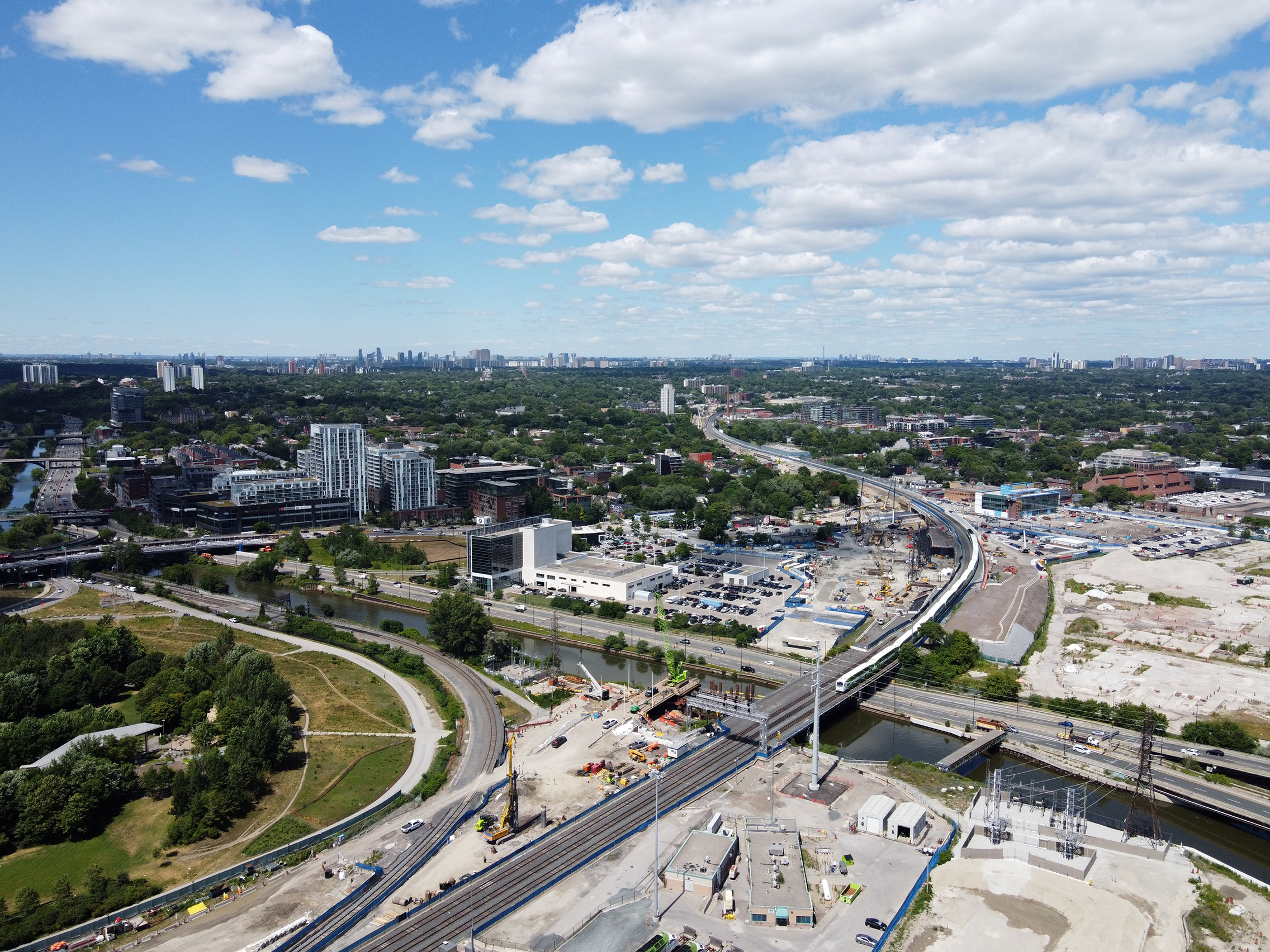
- Aerial view of South Riverdale in 2024

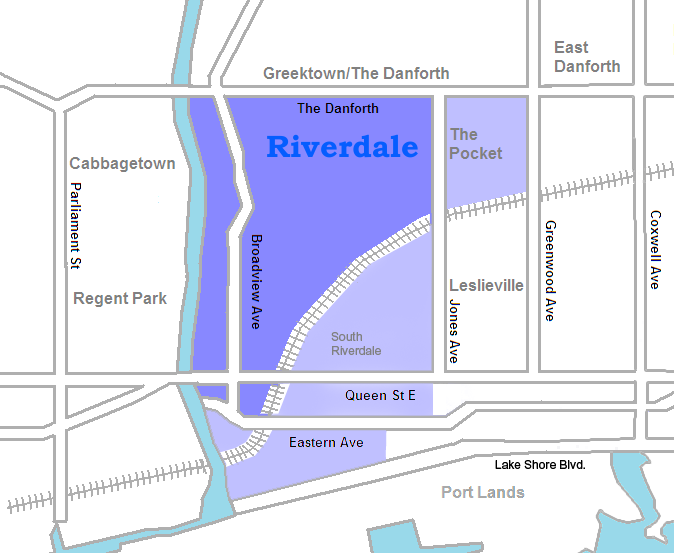

- Location within Toronto
- Coordinates: 43°40′04″N 79°20′59″W
- Country: Canada
- Province: Ontario
- City: Toronto

Government
  - MP: Julie Dabrusin (Liberal)
  - MPP: Peter Tabuns (New Democratic)

Population
  - Total: 38,900
- Time zone: UTC-05:00 (EST)
  - Summer (DST): UTC-04:00 (EDT)

Riverdale is a large neighbourhood in Toronto, Ontario, Canada. It is bounded by the Don River Valley to the west, Danforth Avenue and Greektown to the north, Jones Avenue, the CN/GO tracks, Leslieville to the east, and Lake Shore Boulevard to the south.

== History ==
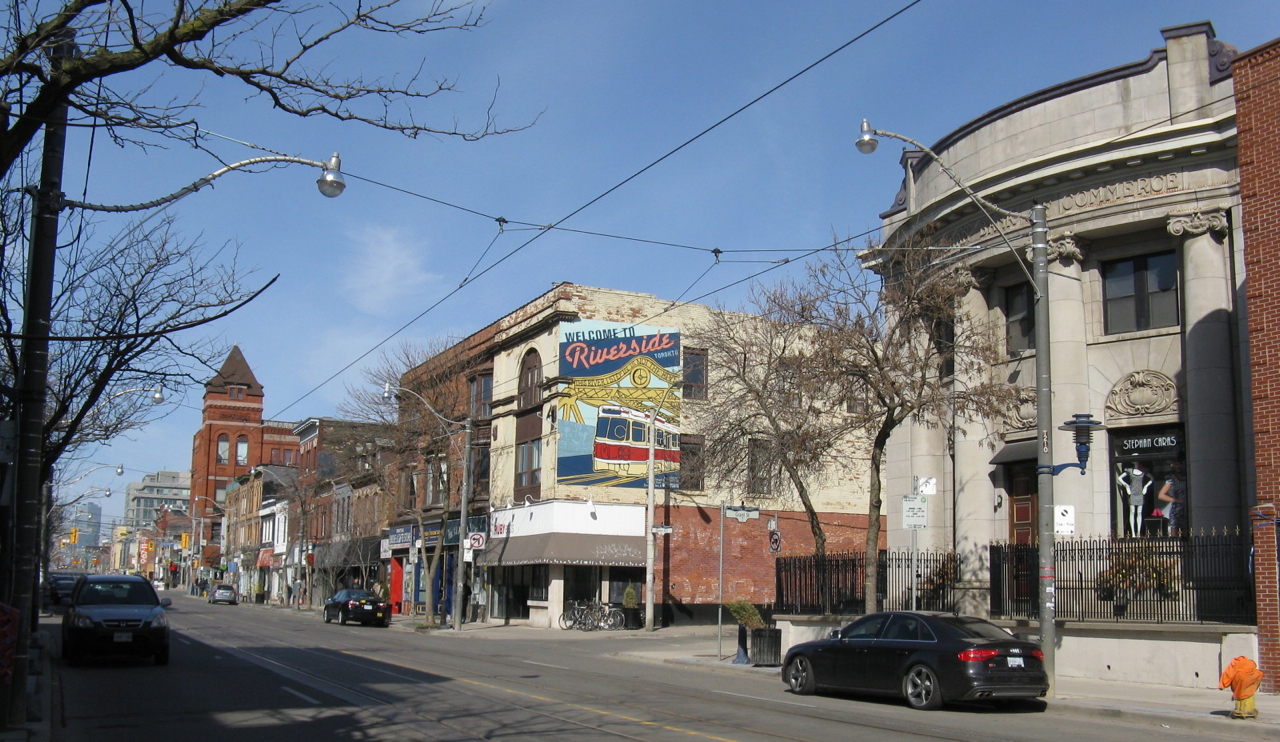
View of Riverdale toward Broadview Ave. from Queen Street East

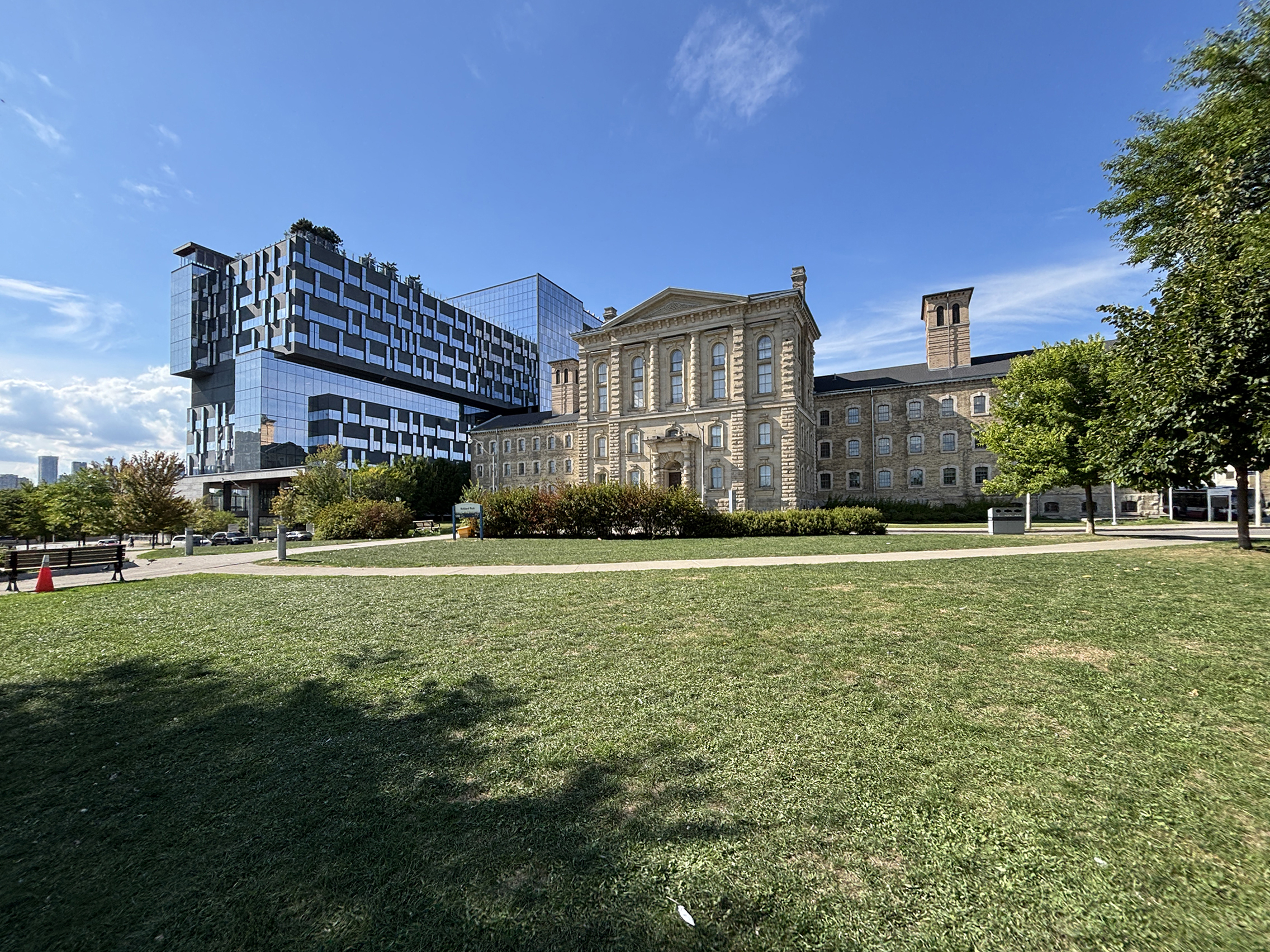
Hennick Bridgepoint Hospital was expanded in 2003 to include the former Don Jail.

In 1875, the House of Refuge (later renamed Riverdale Hospital) opened at the corner of Broadview Avenue and Gerrard Street East. The hospital took on its current name Bridgepoint Active Healthcare in 2002, and later expanded to include the former Don Jail in the Bridgepoint Redevelopment project. The hospital is now called Hennick Bridgepoint Hospital and is part of Sinai Health.

The 1884 annexation of the area then called Riverside Don Mount and Leslieville an area from the Don valley on the west to Greenwood on the east, and from Danforth on the north to Queen Street on the south.

Riverdale is located just east of Toronto's downtown core. Since its amendment to the City of Toronto in 1884, it has developed a stature as a neighbourhood of independent arts, with several independent galleries located along Queen Street East. The residential landscape within Riverdale is made up primarily of Victorian and Edwardian style homes, constructed in the 1800s as boarding rooms for the working-class.

== Communities within Riverdale ==
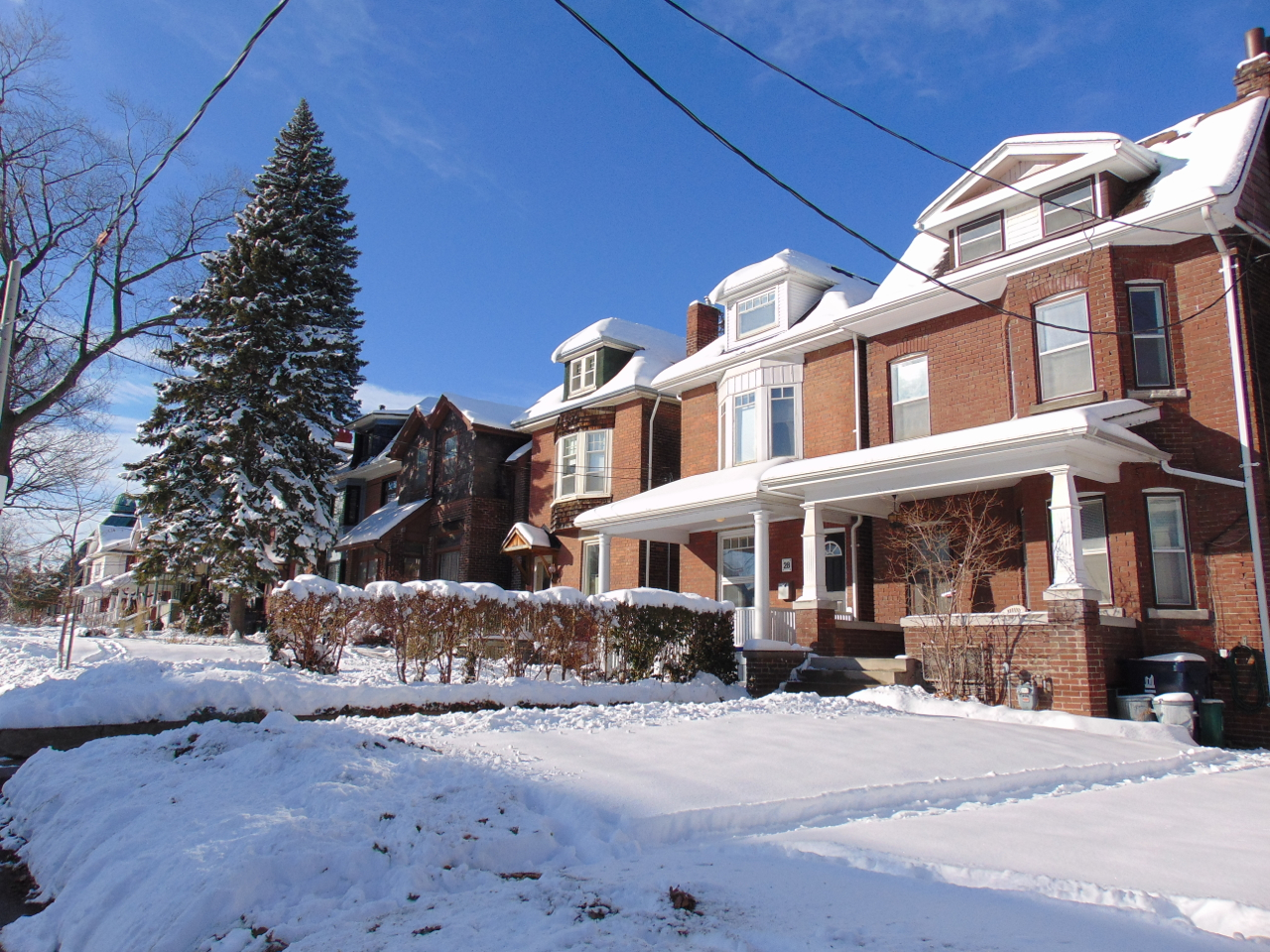
A residential area in "Upper Riverdale". Houses north of Riverdale Avenue are typically newer, and renovated compared to the homes in "Lower Riverdale".

"Riverdale" can refer to a smaller area or a larger area around it as well. The smaller, core area of Riverdale refers to the stretch of Toronto east of the Don Valley Parkway and west of Jones, between Danforth Avenue (north) and Gerrard Street (south). This area is occasionally referred to as "North Riverdale" or prime Riverdale. "Riverdale" sometimes is used to refer to a much wider area that includes "South Riverdale" and less frequently areas east of Jones. This area includes many smaller communities, usually centred around a 'high street' or commercial area.

=== Upper Riverdale and Lower Riverdale ===
Some Riverdale residents differentiate between "upper" and "lower" Riverdale. "Upper Riverdale" is characterized as the part of the neighbourhood north of Riverdale Ave., and "Lower Riverdale" is the area south of Riverdale Ave. In terms of the quality of the housing supply, homes built in "upper Riverdale" are more likely to be renovated, but "Lower Riverdale" contains more original and classic designs of the late 19th century. There are a number of remarkable century-old homes built on Simpson and Langley Avenues, the latter street named after Toronto's well-known early 20th century architect, and the former featuring the oldest Victorian houses in Riverdale. Of note, Simpson Avenue is home to the original six houses of Riverdale; located at the west end of the street and locally known as the 'Six Sisters.'

=== South Riverdale ===
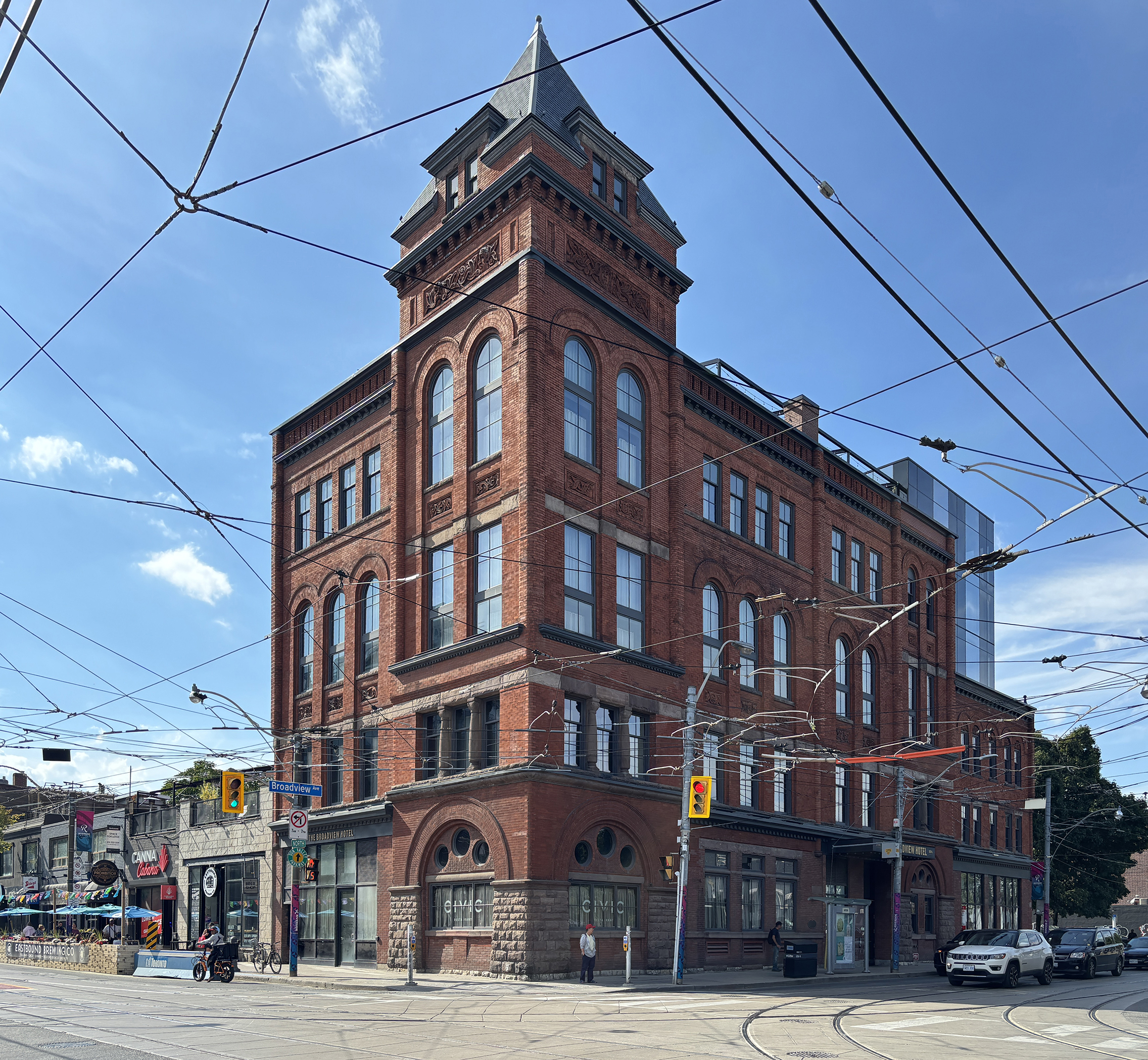
Erected in 1893, Broadview Hotel is located in Riverside, an area of South Riverdale.

"South Riverdale", as its name suggests, is the southern half of the Riverdale neighbourhood, south of Lower Riverdale. Its approximate boundaries are: the Don Valley Parkway to the west, Jones Ave. to the east, Gerrard Street East to the north, and Lake Shore Boulevard to the south.

South Riverdale comprises many smaller neighbourhoods:

==== Riverside ====
"Riverside", also known as the "Queen Broadview Village", is a neighbourhood located within the larger neighbourhood of South Riverdale. The Riverside Business Improvement Area places the definite boundaries as running along the Don River and bordering the streets of Gerrard Street East, Empire Avenue, and Eastern Avenue.

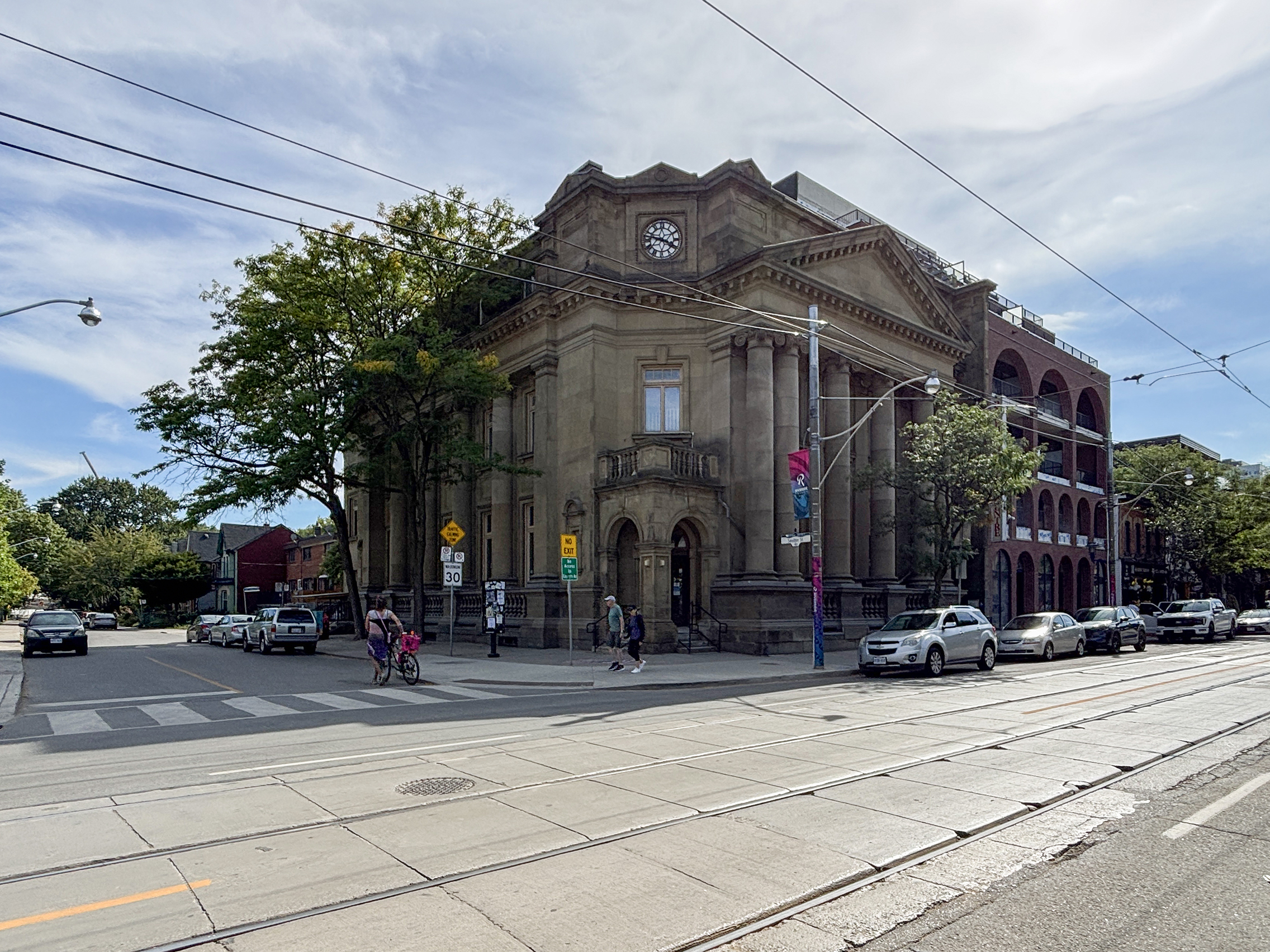
The Ralph Thornton Community Centre is a local landmark in Riverside.

Riverside is a mixed income and multicultural neighbourhood currently experiencing a trend of "gentrification" along Queen St. East and Broadview Ave. It had been home to the Don Destructor, a Toronto garbage incinerator which was demolished in 2004. Don Mount Court, a social housing project was recently redeveloped as a mixed social housing and market value community. The market value portion is being sold under the name Rivertowne.

Riverside is known for its many historic buildings and rich cultural heritage. The biggest landmark in the neighbourhood is the Broadview Hotel, a red sandstone commercial block in Romanesque style constructed in 1891–3, that was the tallest structure in South Riverdale for many decades. Other major landmarks include the Ralph Thornton Community Centre,(Queen Saulter branch Toronto Public Library) Broadview Lofts, and The Opera House. Riverside was also the location of Sunlight Park, Toronto's first baseball stadium.

The area has a large young population, evident in the cluster of schools just east of Broadview Avenue. Dundas Junior Public School is the resident school for children in kindergarten through to fifth grade, after which they are transferred to Queen Alexandra Sr. Public School which sees students through to eighth grade. It is also home to the First Nations School of Toronto, a cultural survival school that places heavy emphasis on aboriginal values and culture, and SEED Alternative Secondary School, Canada's first public alternative school.

Riverside is rapidly emerging as a district of independent design, furniture, and food retailers, as well as restaurants.

The southern industrial area was occupied by Lever Brothers Soap Factory from the 1890s until 2009. The factory demolished is now waiting for redevelopment as commercial and industrial use by Cadillac Fairview.

==== East Chinatown ====
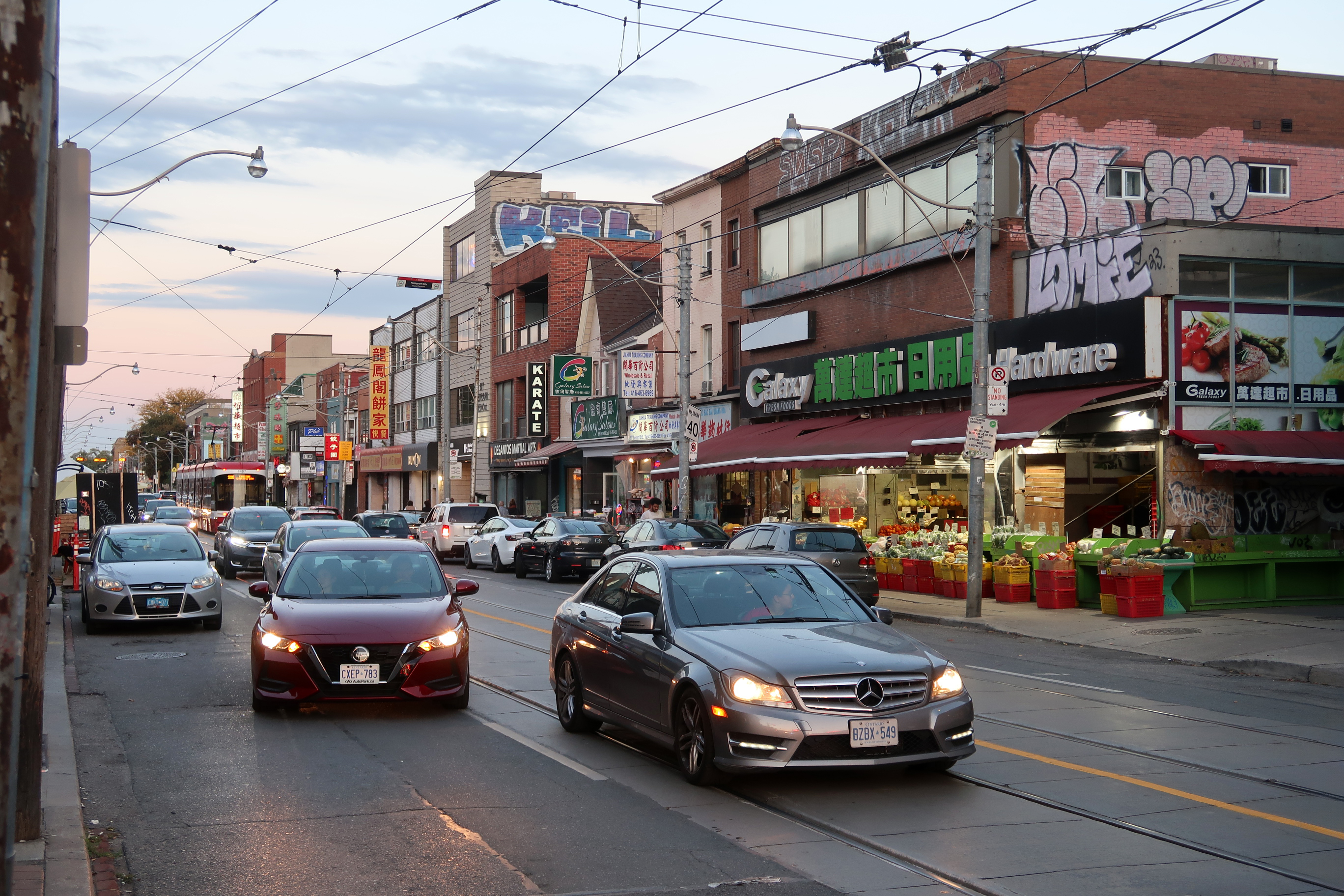
Toronto's second largest Chinatown, also known as East Chinatown, is located north of Riverside, around Broadview Avenue and Gerrard Street.

Toronto's second largest Chinatown, also known as East Chinatown is found at Broadview & Gerrard. At the northernmost corner of East Chinatown (northwest corner, Broadview Avenue and Gerrard Street) is the Riverdale branch of the Toronto Public Library. This branch is bilingual in Chinese and English. North of the library is the monument to Sun Yat-sen. Construction on the Toronto Chinese Archway began in the western end of East Chinatown on November 24, 2008, and it opened to the public on September 12, 2009. There are only two streets with bilingual signs (English on top, Chinese on the bottom), Broadview Avenue (百樂匯街) and Gerrard Street East (芝蘭東街), and signs located three of the four corners of the intersection.

==== Studio District ====
The southern part of South Riverdale, just north of the Port Lands, is what's called the "Studio District". Industrial warehouses along Lakeshore Avenue house production studios, and many people working in film and television live in the old Victorians found along the area's side streets. Carlaw and Queen has become an arts hub, with many artists choosing to run their studios from the various work-live lofts.

=== Blake-Jones ===
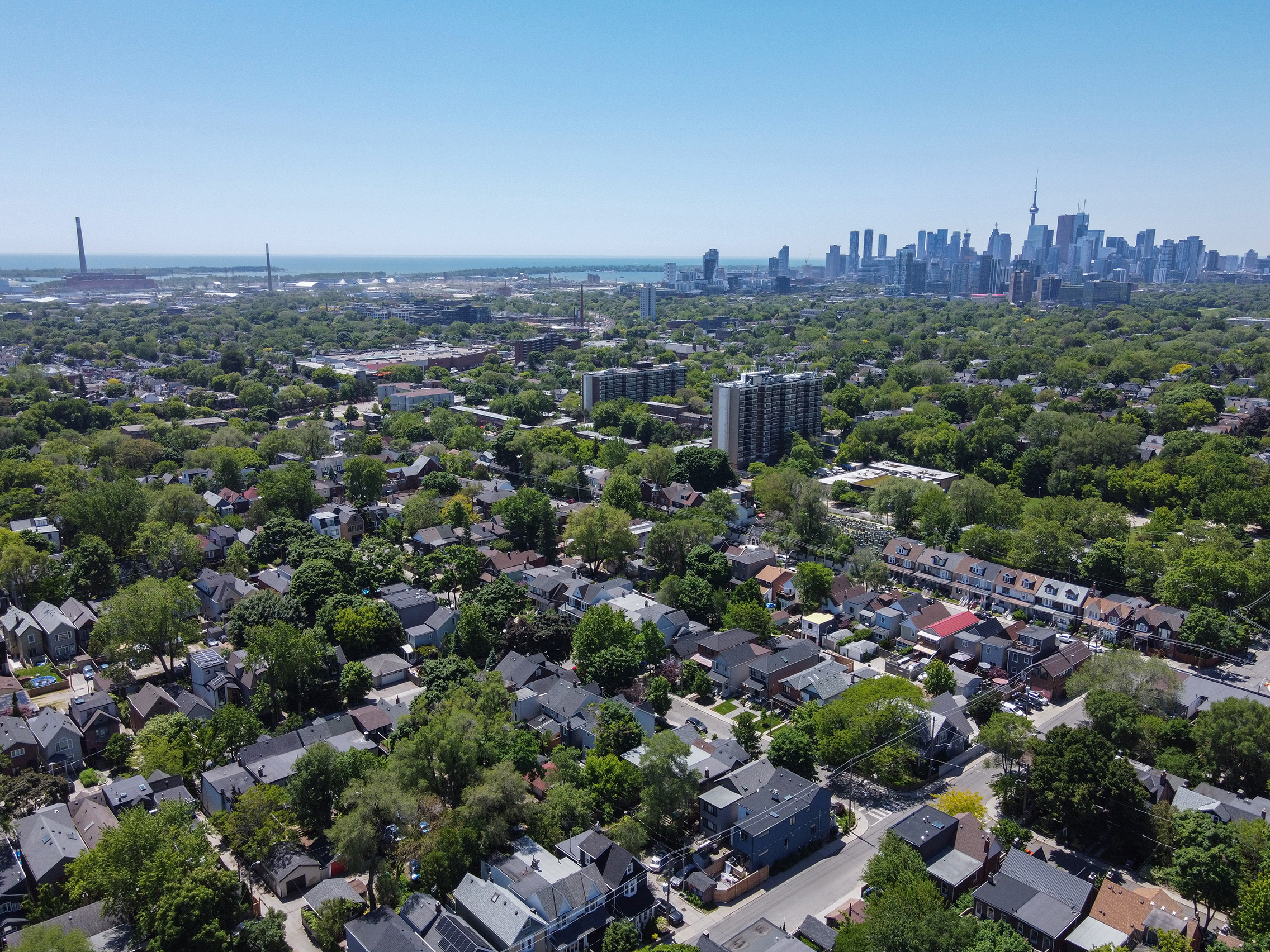
Aerial view of Blake-Jones in 2024

"Blake-Jones" is a section of tree-lined streets with residences built from the 1870s to 1930s. The neighbourhood extends along Jones Avenue commencing at the cemetery south of Strathcona and extending down to Hunter. It is bordered by Danforth Avenue to the north, Pape Avenue to the west, Greenwood Avenue to the east and the CN Railway tracks just south of Riverdale/Boultbee Avenue to the south. Houses along Blake Street are more affordable in this neighbourhood than in many areas of the city because most of the homes are semi-detached. There are also a significant number of residents within public housing, residing in apartment and townhouse complex of Blake/Boultbee, owned by Toronto Community Housing. With a 33.3% unemployment rate in youth aged 15–19, the Blake-Jones corridor of Riverdale has seen an increase in crime in recent years.

There are two local elementary schools zoned to the area; Blake Street (which also houses East end Alternative) and Pape Avenue. The high school that is zoned to the area is Riverdale Collegiate Institute.

The neighbourhood is served by the Pape, Donlands, and Greenwood subway stations and the 72 Pape and 83 Jones bus routes and is also home to the Greenwood Subway Yard, a landmark within the area.

==== The Pocket ====
Located within Blake-Jones is an area residents refer to as "The Pocket". Over time there have been some differences on the exact definition of the area, but currently the Pocket is understood to be "accessible only from the west along Jones Avenue". This would indicate that the area would be bordered by Chatham Street at the north (which itself is not accessible from Jones, except by bicycles on the recently created bike lane), and on the southern end by Boultbee Ave. The Eastern side is bordered by the TTC Greenwood yard. As of January 2013 the Pocket Community Association declared they served an area that is "bounded on the west by Jones Ave, on the east by Greenwood Avenue, on the north by Danforth Ave, and on the south by the railroad tracks abutting Boultbee Avenue in Toronto, Ontario, Canada. The community is served by the Pocket Community Association.

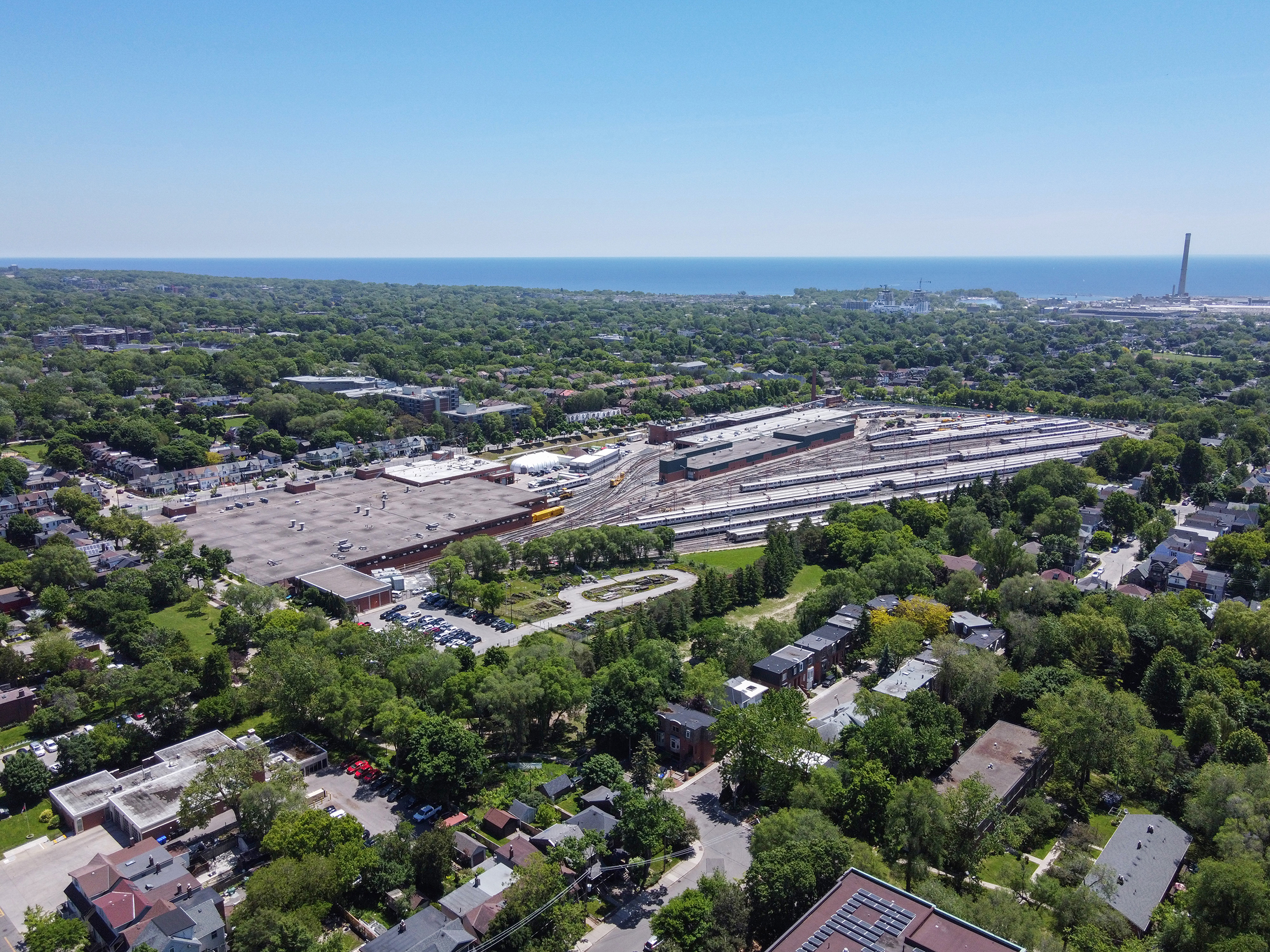
Located in the southeastern portion of Blake-Jones, Greenwood Yard is a rail yard with support buildings that service subway vehicles of the Toronto subway system.

The name "The Pocket" was created by area residents during a planning session attended by Susan McMurray, also an editor of a newsletter for the area. The name has stuck in part because of the "village feel" of the community, and has become well used by residents and realtors in the area. The Pocket has been experiencing a gentrification similar of that to the most of Riverdale and other neighbourhoods within Toronto. For The Pocket, this started in the 1990s. The neighbourhood is listed as one of the ten hottest areas in Toronto Life and is described as "coveted" by the Globe and Mail indicating that buyers will pay a premium to live in the community. The Pocket has an above average number of people from the Muslim and Greek Orthodox communities living in the area.

The area has benefitted from a strong group of volunteers who have done much to make the area safer and prettier. Such projects as cleaning up and renaming Ben Kerr Lane, an annual street party on Dawson Avenue, street sales, organized pot lucks, not to mention a great number of improvements to Phin Park. Phin Park has had a number of mature trees planted along its central lighted walkway, an outdoor ice rink created every winter, the placement of large boulders removed during street work, and the building of a gazebo next to the playground for parents to cool off while their children play. Throughout the year there are events at the park organized and paid for by the community including monthly movie nights and an excellent fireworks show on Victoria Day. Another beautification project included building a small orchard and community garden area north of the Greenwood TTC yard.

=== Badgerow ===
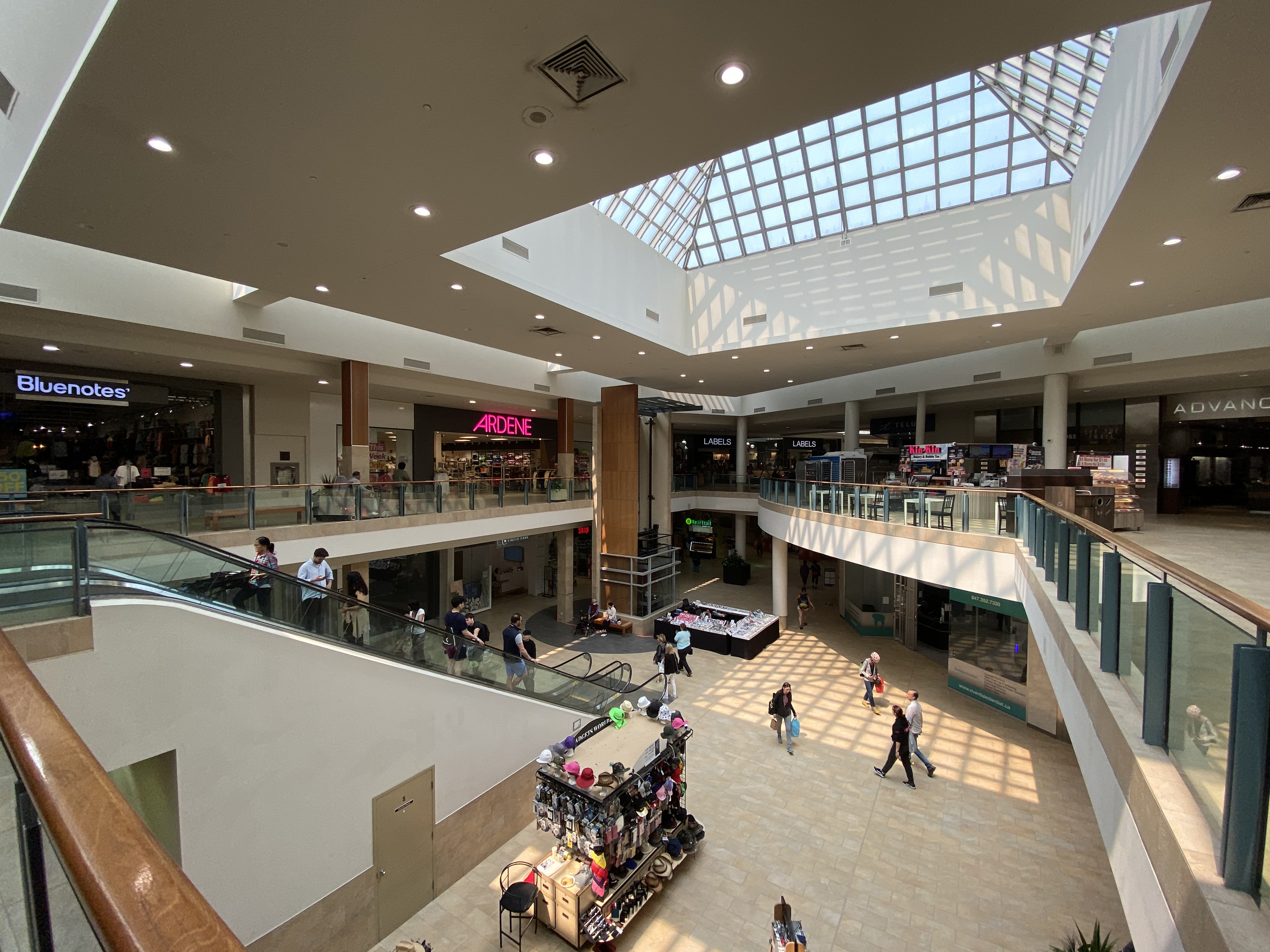
Gerrard Square shopping mall

The area bounded by Dundas St. East in the south, Jones Ave. to the east, the railway tracks to the north, and Carlaw Ave. to the west is also referred to by local residents as "Badgerow", after a residential street that runs through the centre of that area. This pocket includes the legendary Maple Leaf Tavern, as well as a Sikh temple, Turkish cultural centre and Jewish cemetery, in addition to the Gerrard Square shopping mall.

== Culture ==
Riverdale's character is composed primarily from its multiculturalism; with several cultural neighbourhoods along its major paths. Danforth Avenue (commonly referred to as "The Danforth" in Greek Town) has a high concentration of Greek restaurants while Gerrard Street East and parts of Broadview Avenue are home to a variety of Asian shops and restaurants (referred to as East Chinatown). South of Queen Street East are several large corporate film studios extending down to the waterfront. Riverdale is home to the Gerrard Square Mall; which features a variety of retail, restaurant, and small shops. The neighbourhood's character is also defined by the CN Railway, which separates the area into two districts.

== Education ==
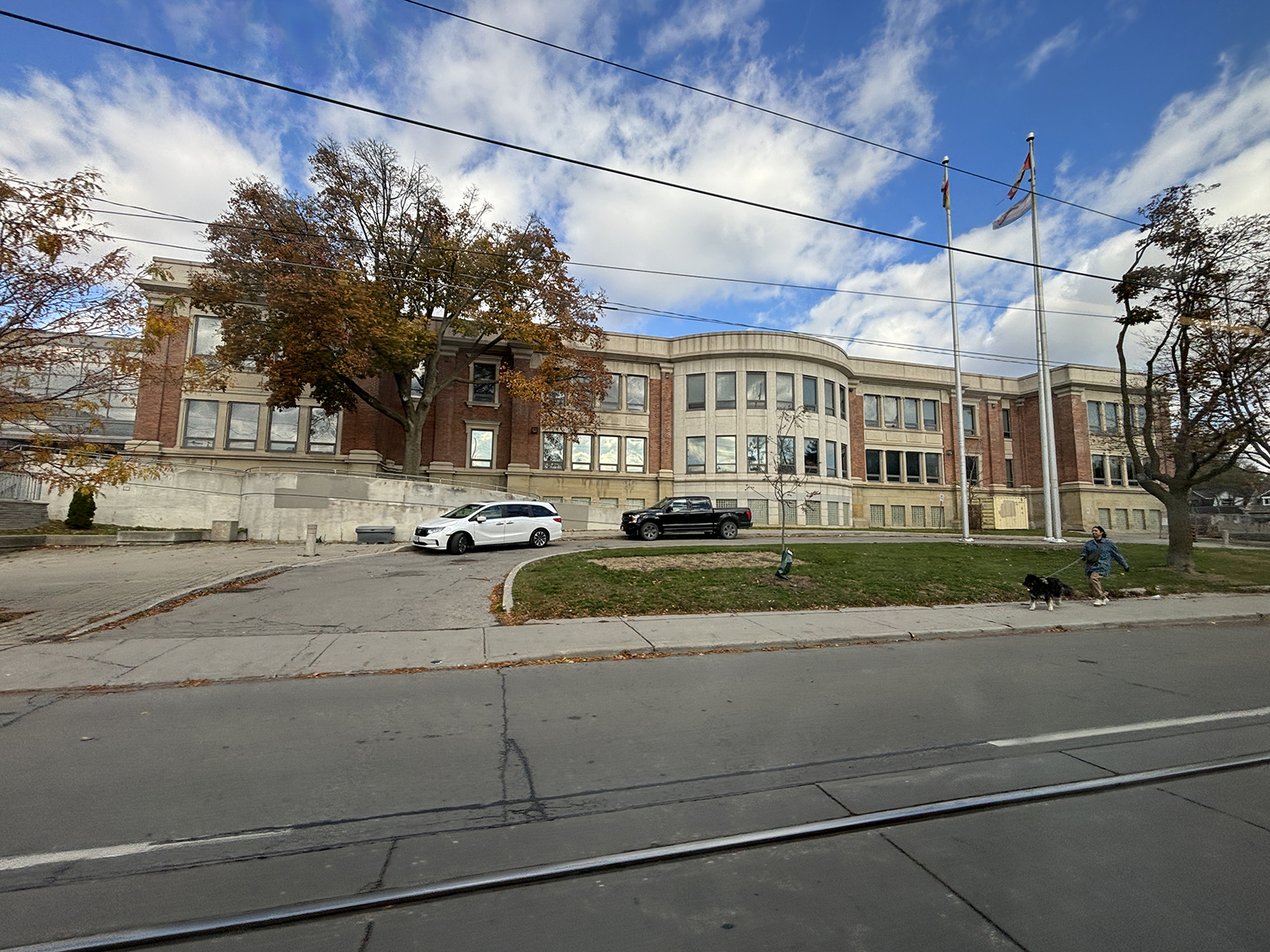
Riverdale Collegiate Institute is a public secondary school operated by the Toronto District School Board.

There are four Toronto-based school boards that provides public education for the city, including the neighbourhood of Riverdale. Two of the four Toronto-based school boards teach primarily in English, the secular Toronto District School Board, and the separate Toronto Catholic District School Board. The institutions operated by the other two Toronto-based school boards, the secular Conseil scolaire Viamonde (CSV), and separate Conseil scolaire catholique MonAvenir (CSCM), are a French first language public school board. However, CSV does not operate a school in Riverdale.

Both CSCM and TCDSB operates one public elementary school in Riverdale. CSCM operates, École élémentaire catholique du Bon-Berger, whereas TCDSB operates Holy Name Catholic School. Holy Name was founded in 1913 by the Sisters of St. Joseph with four classrooms. Eight more classrooms were added in 1918. In 1931, two more portables were installed and 8 room addition was built in 1949 totalling to 20 classrooms. To service the ever-increasing population an annex was built in 1957 and extended in 1961 to provide a total of 31 classrooms but it was joined to the main building providing a library, a gymnasium and several more classrooms in 1968. Holy Name is a feeder school for graduates who would later attend St. Patrick, Neil McNeil and Notre Dame secondary schools, all of which are located outside Riverdale.

TDSB is the only school board that operates a secondary school in the neighbourhood, Riverdale Collegiate Institute. In addition to the secondary school, TDSB operates City Adult Learning Centre, one of five Toronto District School Board adult learning centres serving the area, and . The building was built in 1963 as "Parkway Vocational School" as a vocational school, which traces back to "Jarvis Junior Vocational School" as an extension to Jarvis Collegiate Institute. Parkway was later renamed to "Parkview Secondary School" and was closed in 1983 due to low enrolment. On September 26, 2024, the Jones Avenue Learning Centre (540 Jones Ave, M4J 3G9) was reopened to the public for Adult ESL classes and services after a fire broke out in 2019 and reconstruction starting in early 2020.

In addition to secondary education, TDSB operate a number of public schools. TDSB schools in Riverdale include:

- "Earl Grey Senior Public School" is the area's local middle school, grade 7–8.
- "Quest Alternative School" is the area's original alternative middle school, and one of the first in Toronto. Consisting of 68 students and 4 staff, Quest celebrated its 25th anniversary in 2008. The school's motto is: "Structure to learn and freedom to grow", and its focus is on student-centered learning and diverse curriculum.
- "East Alternative School of Toronto" is another local alternative middle school, specializing in social justice and visual arts. It also has 68 students and accepts students from all over Toronto.
- "Withrow Avenue Junior Public School", "Jackman Avenue Junior Public School", "Frankland Community School", and "Pape Avenue Junior Public School" are the four local junior public schools in North Riverdale.

In addition to public schooling, Riverdale is home to private schools as well. Montcrest School is located on Montcrest Boulevard and in several converted houses on Broadview Avenue just north of Riverdale Park. The school has been in operation since 1961, previously operating under the name "The January School".

== Politics ==
=== Provincial politics ===
Riverdale is in the provincial riding of Toronto—Danforth, and is currently represented in the Ontario provincial parliament by Peter Tabuns, deputy leader of the Ontario New Democratic Party. Municipally, Riverdale is in Toronto Ward 30, represented by Toronto city councillor Paula Fletcher. Federally it is represented by Julie Dabrusin of the Liberal Party of Canada.

Provincially, the riding was known as Riverdale from the 1914 Ontario provincial election until the 1999 Ontario provincial election when the number of provincial ridings were reduced and given the same borders and names as federal ridings, in this case Broadview—Greenwood and, more recently, Toronto—Danforth. In all its guises it has elected a New Democrat in every election since 1963.

In 1964 a by-election set the template for future NDP campaigns that would be referred to as the "Riverdale model". Under the campaign management of Gerald Caplan, Stephen Lewis, and Marjorie Pinney the NDP canvassed every household three times, identified all their supporters, and then they got out the vote. This strategy is also known as PIG, Persuade, Identify, Get out the vote. Lawyer Jim Renwick won with 7,287 votes compared to 5,774 votes for the Conservatives and 5,771 votes for the Liberals.day.

=== Federal politics ===
Federally the riding, known for many years as Broadview and then Broadview—Greenwood, has been represented by New Democrats from 1962 (the first federal election after the party was formed) until 1988, when Liberal Dennis Mills won the seat. Mills held the riding until 2004, when NDP leader Jack Layton won the seat.

== Recreation ==
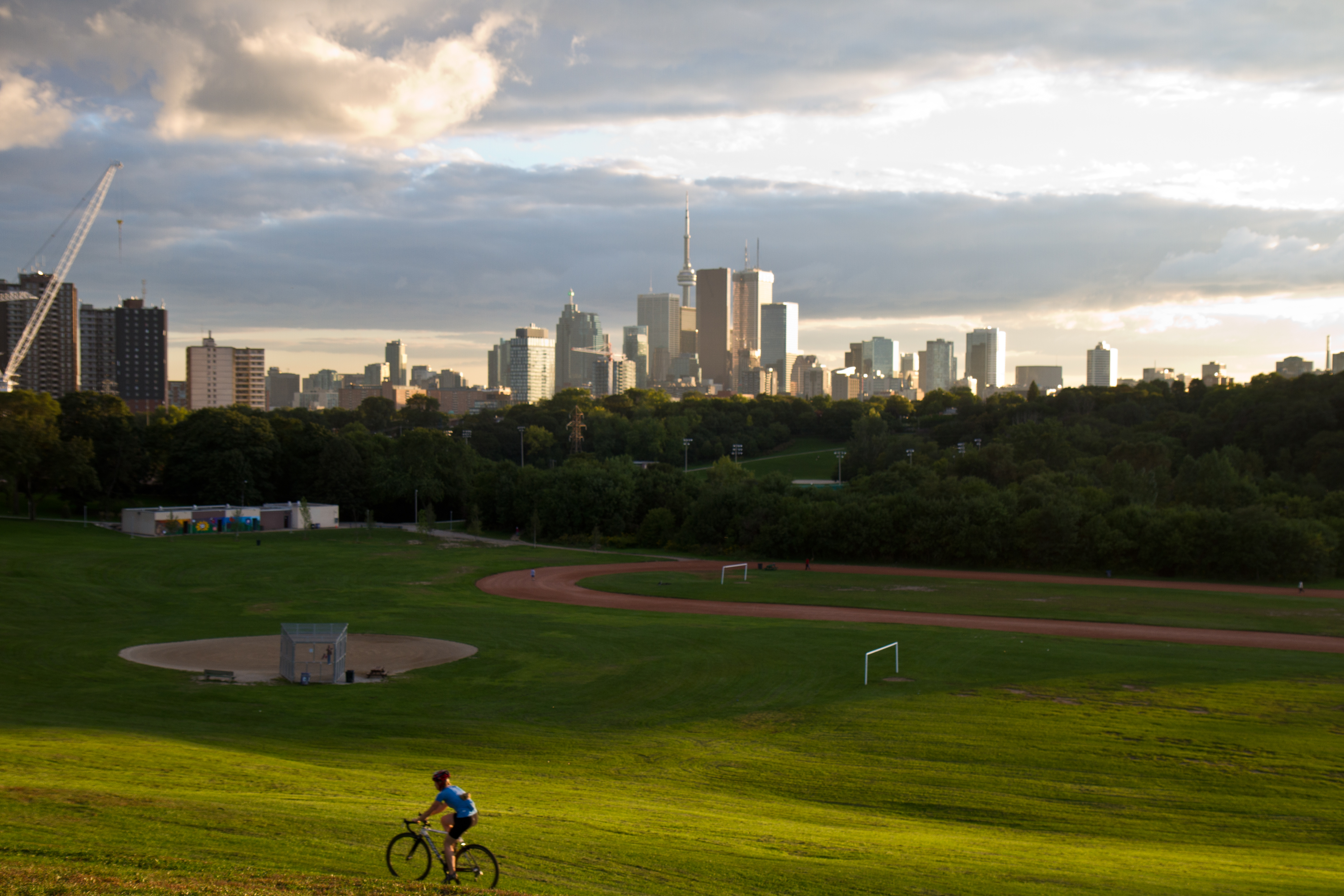
View of Riverdale Park, one of three municipal parks located in Riverdale.

There are three medium to large sized parks in Riverdale. At the west edge between Broadview Avenue and the Don Valley Parkway just north of Bridgepoint Health is Riverdale Park. This park features a running track, three baseball diamonds, a skating rink, a public swimming pool and tennis courts. Just to the east of Riverdale Park is Withrow Park which has a large off-leash dog area, an ice rink, two baseball diamonds, play structures, and a soccer field. In South Riverdale is Jimmie Simpson Park which contains tennis courts and a community centre. In the southwest corner just north of Queen St. East on Broadview Avenue is the Royal Canadian Curling Club. The curling club features six sheets and hosts leagues for about 500 members. The last park in Riverdale located further east along Blake Street is Kempton Howard Park (formerly East View Park) and was renamed in 2007 in honour of a youth worker who was killed in 2003 in the Blake/Boultbee community in which he lived and worked. Hubbard Park located next to Riverdale Library is named for William Peyton Hubbard.

== Notable roads ==
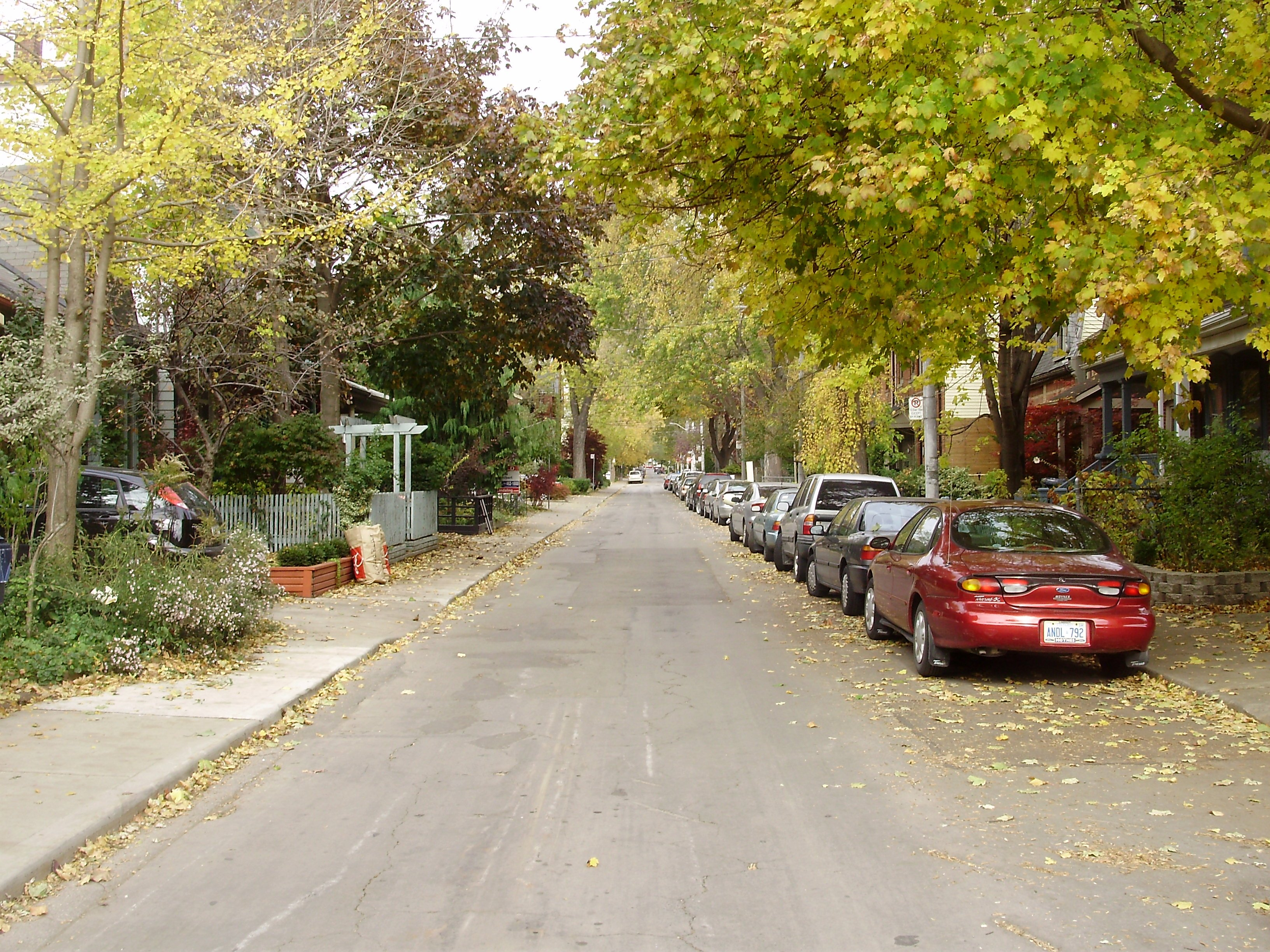
De Grassi Street is a notable street in "Lower" Riverdale.

- Broadview Avenue
- De Grassi Street
- Eastern Avenue
- Dundas Street East
- Gerrard Street East
- Danforth Avenue

== Notable people ==
- Bashir Makhtal
- Steven Page
- William Allen
- John Sewell
- Tom Clifford
- Paul Christie
- Derwyn Shea
- Steve Stavro
- Ying Hope
- Charles A. Walton
- Donald Dean Summerville
- Luba Goy
- Morley Callaghan
- Desmond Morton
- Punch Imlach
- Michael Hollett
- Dennis Drainville
- Raphael Marcus
- Michael Ironside
- Bnei Akiva
- David Reville
- Melissa DiMarco
- Robert S. Kenny
- Lynne Griffin
- Paul Soles
- Christian Lander
- William Peyton Hubbard
- KO
- Owen Staples

== See also ==
- Streetcar suburb
