= Murder of Julie Berman =

Canadian transgender rights activist

Julie Berman
- Born: 1967 or 1968
- Died: 22 December 2019 (aged 51); Toronto, Ontario, Canada
- Known for: Transgender advocacy

The murder of Canadian transgender rights activist Julie Berman (1968 – 22 December 2019) occurred in downtown Toronto. Berman was found in a home with severe head injuries on 22 December 2019; she was brought to a hospital and pronounced dead. Colin Harnack was charged with second-degree murder, and he was convicted in December 2022. The murder of Berman was cited as a prominent example of violence against trans people in Canada.

Berman was a hairdresser, prominent for trans-activism within the Toronto LGBTQ+ community, who had volunteered with the Toronto-based LGBTQ+ charity The 519 for three decades. Berman fought to raise awareness of anti-trans violence in Toronto and was involved with running Toronto's "Trans Day of Remembrance", which she had also spoken at. Upon her death, Berman was hailed as a "lovely person who was committed to the political issues that are facing her community in Canada", a "champion for trans rights". Finance minister Bill Morneau, Toronto mayor John Tory, and Pride Toronto released statements mourning the death of Berman. A vigil was held for her death in February 2020.
