= Raphael Marcus =

Canadian rabbi (d. 2007)

Rabbi Raphael Marcus (died November 21, 2007) was a scholar of Halakha, a leader in the Toronto Jewish Community and a student of Mussar. He was well known within circles of Orthodox Judaism.

== Biography ==
Marcus was the official rabbi of B'nai Torah Congregation in Toronto, Ontario. A native of New York, he attended Rabbi Jacob Joseph School for both elementary and high school. For his post-secondary education, Marcus attended various yeshivot in Israel, including Kerem B'Yavneh and the Mir Yeshiva, where he attained a reputation for his brilliance and astounding moral character. He continued his studies at the Hebrew Theological College of Illinois where he received rabbinic ordination under his Rebbe and father-in-law, Rabbi Ahron Soloveichik. While learning in Chicago, Marcus attended Northeastern Illinois University.

Upon receiving rabbinic ordination, Marcus decided to pursue a career in Jewish education. He first moved to New York and joined the faculty of Mesivta Ohr Torah of Riverdale. Although it was not Marcus's desire to become the pulpit rabbi of the Young Israel of Woodmere, he nevertheless reluctantly accepted a temporary position there. This was the beginning of his career as a pulpit rabbi. From that experience, Marcus went on to assume a rabbinical position at Congregation Ohev Tzedek for five years before moving to Toronto.

Marcus moved to B'nai Torah on March 1, 1980, with his wife Rochel Leah, and for 26 years he led the community. He was a teacher at Yeshivat Or Chaim for boys and Ulpanat Orot, a member of the Toronto Vaad Harabonim and a member of the city's Beis Din.

Marcus died on November 21, 2007, after a long illness. The burial services took place in Jerusalem, Israel, on Har Ha-Zeitim.
