= Central Neighbourhood House =

Settlement house in Toronto, Ontario, Canada

Central Neighbourhood House (CNH) is a settlement house in Toronto, Ontario, Canada. Founded in 1911 by social reformers J.J. Kelso and Elizabeth Neufeld, it is Toronto's second oldest settlement house. It is currently located in the Regent Park area of Toronto at 349 Ontario Street.

CNH was originally established at 84 Gerrard Street West as a settlement house for new immigrants to "The Ward", a slum area between College Street, Queen Street, Yonge Street, and University Avenue which was, until the early decades of the twentieth century, a reception area for newly arrived immigrants. Unlike other charities that offered assistance to immigrants at the time, it was not affiliated with any church and did not seek to convert its clients to Christianity (or to a particular denomination). It offered a wide range of programs, primarily aimed at immigrant women and children, ranging from boxing to sewing.

As The Ward was gradually demolished and redeveloped, CNH moved east, relocating in 1929 to Sherbourne Street where it remained until 1970 when it moved to its current location of 349 Ontario Street.

Today, it provides a broad range of services.

Central Neighbourhood House now serves a catchment area which includes the neighbourhoods of Regent Park, Moss Park and St. Jamestown. These neighbourhoods are among the lowest income but also most culturally diverse in Toronto, Canada and North America, and are the first place of residence for thousands of new Canadians each year.

In 2014, Central Neighbourhood House amalgamated with Neighbourhood Link Support Services, a multi service agency in Toronto's east end, to form The Neighbourhood Group. The new organization continues all of the work of the two former entities, and continues to be accountable to and representative of the downtown and east end neighbourhoods.

== Programs and Services ==
CNH provides a range of services grouped under Childcare, Children and Youth Services, Women's Program, Family Support, Street Survivors, Supportive Housing, and the Vulnerable Seniors program. CNH is supported by the United Way, City of Toronto, Ministry of Health, and numerous foundations and individual donors.

CNH is a member of Toronto Neighbourhood Centres, an association of over thirty multi-service, non-profit neighbourhood centres in Toronto.
