= Kempton Howard Park =

Park in Toronto, Ontario, Canada

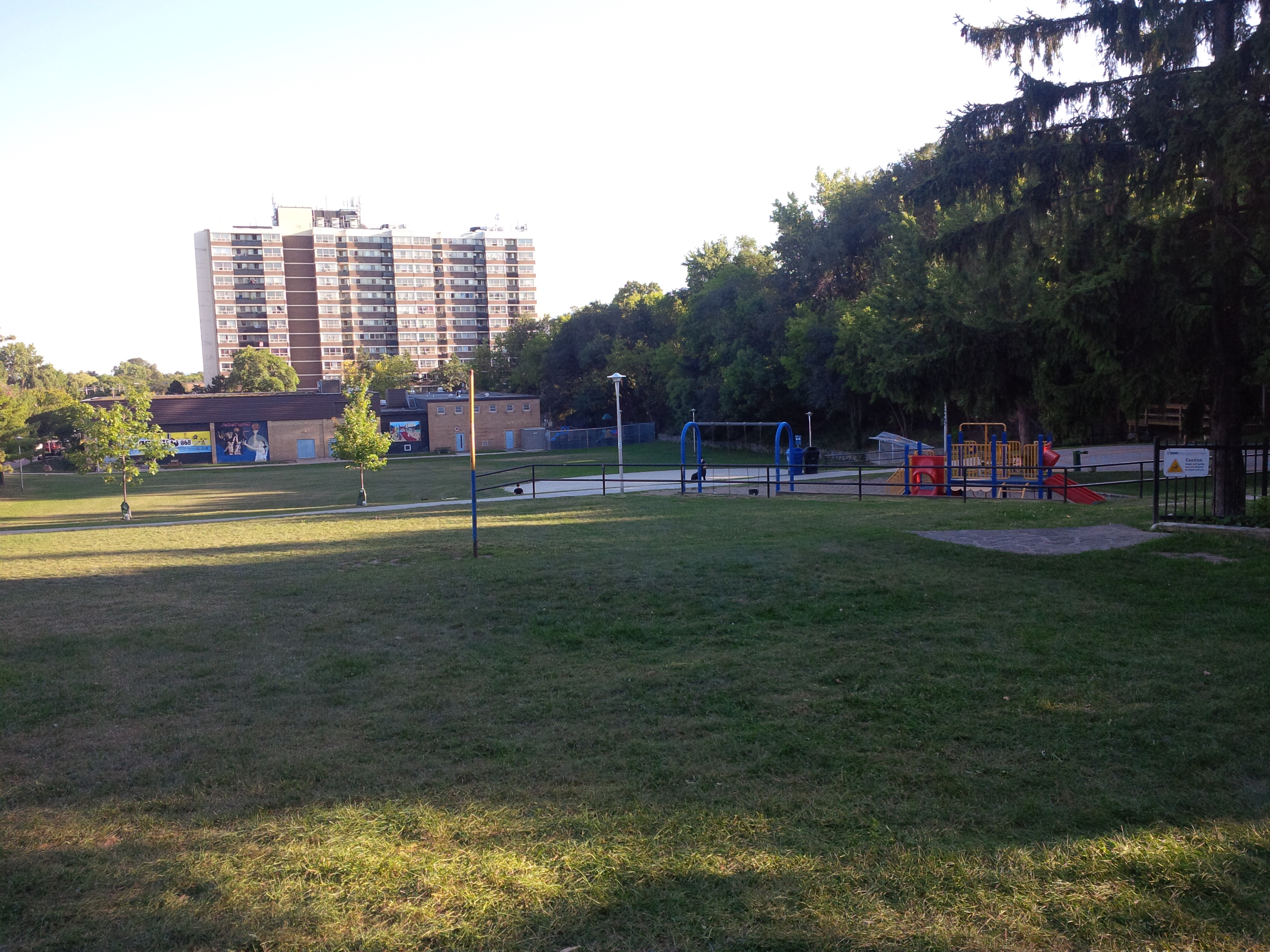

- Location within Toronto
- Type: Public park
- Location: Toronto, Ontario, Canada
- Coordinates: 43°40′33″N 79°20′25″W
- Operator: Toronto Parks
- Website: Kempton Howard Park

Kempton Howard Park is located in the Blake-Jones area of Riverdale, Toronto, Ontario, Canada. It is located on the southwest corner of Strathcona Avenue and Blake Street, directly adjacent to the Eastview Neighbourhood Community Centre, home of the Eastview Boys & Girls Clubs of Canada.

The park has a variety of outdoor amenities, including a baseball diamond, an outdoor wading pool and a playground. The park's primary use is for baseball games, and has a wired field screen as a part of the baseball diamond, open year-round for the public. The baseball diamond is listed under the Classification C type, given its relatively small size and unirrigated turf.

== History ==
The park's original name was Eastview Park, however, after a tragic slaying of a local youth worker in December 2003, the park was renamed in his honour. The official renaming of the park took place on May 11, 2007, with a local councillor, as well as several community and family members of the slain worker in attendance. This park has since been adopted as a playground not only for the youth in the Boys & Girls Club, but for the kids and youth of the Blake/Boultbee community as well. Kempton Howard (whom the park was named after) was an active staff member of the Boys & Girls Club before his death.
