= Toronto Humane Society =

Animal welfare charity

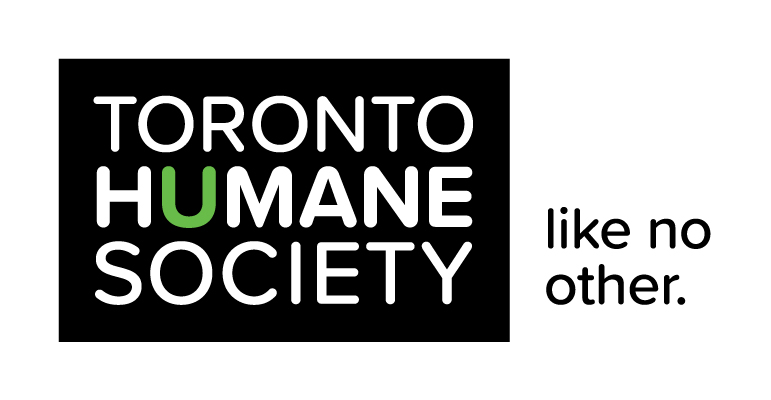
- Formation: 1886; 140 years ago
- Type: Animal welfare organization in Canada
- Legal status: Active
- Purpose: advocate and public voice, educator and network
- Headquarters: Toronto, Ontario
- Region served: Toronto, Ontario, Canada
- Official language: English; French
- Website: Toronto Humane Society

Toronto Humane Society is a Toronto charity that operates animal shelters and animal rescue operations. It was founded in 1887 by John J. Kelso dedicated to promote both children's aid and the humane treatment of animals. Since 1891, the society focused exclusively on the humane treatment of animals with the Children's Aid Society becoming a distinct organization.

== History ==
=== Origin ===
It was founded by crusading journalist John J. Kelso after he added the comment “Why don't we have a society for the prevention of cruelty?” to a November 1886 letter in the Toronto World about a horse in distressed condition. The paper published additional letters advocating for an anti-cruelty society, one letter read "Toronto is noted for its muddy streets and heavy ruts, and I venture to say there are a few of our observant citizens who have not time and again noticed the inhumane manner in which horses are whipped by their drivers when the wagons get 'stuck.'". The paper collected a total of $74 in anonymous donations and the Canadian Institute invited Kelso to speak at the fourteenth annual meeting on 19 February 1887, where he presented a paper with the title “The Necessity of a Society for the Prevention of Cruelty in Toronto.” where he proposed the formation of a new society for this purpose, instead of reviving the then defunct OSPCA. Kelso then founded the Toronto Humane Society at the inaugural meeting February 24, 1887 as an organization dedicated to promote both children's aid and the humane treatment of animals. The Children's Aid Society ultimately became a distinct organization in 1891, at which time Kelso resigned as a secretary of THS in order to dedicate more of his time to the Children's Aid Society.

The THS was originally located at the intersection of Bay Street and what is now Wellesley Street in downtown Toronto. It is currently located on River Street.

=== 2009 Investigation ===
Following an investigative report in The Globe and Mail, the THS was raided by the Ontario Society for the Prevention of Cruelty to Animals in November 2009 as part of an investigation into allegations of animal cruelty at the centre. THC president Tim Trow and several other society personnel, as well as the board of directors itself, were subsequently charged. A new board of directors was elected in late May 2010, and the shelter re-opened a month later after having been closed for seven months.

All charges against former board members and personnel were withdrawn in August 2010 due to problems with the search warrant under which the 2009 raid had been carried out. An article in the February 2011 edition of Toronto Life suggested that the root of the dispute was that the THS was trying to run its facility as a no-kill shelter, a policy which the OSPCA opposed.

== Literature ==
- Woodger, Kevin (2013). "'We Speak for Those who Cannot Speak for Themselves': The Toronto Humane Society, 1887-1891". Ontario History. 105 (2): 143–159. doi:10.7202/1050731ar. ISSN 0030-2953.
- Kelso, John J (1911). Early history of the humane and children's aid movement in Ontario, 1886-1893. L.K. Cameron. OCLC 1127738621.
