= EditGrid =

Web spreadsheet service

- Developer: Team and Concepts
- Release: 2006
- Stable release: November 2008 Release (rev 24787) (21 November 2008) [±]
- Preview release: November 2008 Release (rev 24787) (21st November, 2008) [±]
- Operating system: Any (Web-based application)
- Available in: Multilingual (9)
- Type: Online spreadsheet
- Website: www.editgrid.com

EditGrid was a Web 2.0 spreadsheet service, operated via Internet access (web-based application). It offered both a free-of-charge service to personal users and a subscription service to organizations and was available on a number of partner sites and channels.

EditGrid was shut down on 1 May 2014.

== History ==
EditGrid was developed, provided and maintained by Team and Concepts, a Hong Kong–based company. The first public beta release of EditGrid was launched on 7 April 2006. It registered its 10,000th personal user in November 2006. In January 2007 EditGrid started to offer organization accounts for free trial and also became available on Salesforce.com's App Exchange platform. On 14 February 2007, EditGrid officially declared out-of-beta and launched its subscription service.

In June 2007, EditGrid announced a $1.25 million series A investment from the WI Harper Group.

EditGrid announced a series of changes to its business in September 2009. According to the change, they were no longer supporting users through future enhancements or subscription based accounts. The user forum and the wiki have been closed. In October 2009 Apple had bought EditGrid.

== Features ==
Touted as the most advanced and well-polished Ajax-enabled spreadsheet, EditGrid included features for shared access and online collaboration on top of conventional spreadsheet functionalities. Its Real-Time Update (RTU) feature allowed multiple users to see changes on a spreadsheet immediately, and it was considered a winning feature among similar products. Its Remote Data feature was able to retrieve live data on the web, while its My Data Format (MDF) feature allowed users to customise the output format using XSLT, such as live KML for Google Earth. Other features included multiple access control levels, revision history, charting, live chat, permalinks and more than 500 spreadsheet functions.

Apart from access from its main site, spreadsheets hosted on EditGrid could be accessed on third-party websites by means of its post-to-blog feature.

In September 2007, the EditGrid iPhone Edition was launched at the Office 2.0 Conference.

In September 2008, EditGrid had launched its JavaScript Macro support, enabling user-programmed macros to manipulate EditGrid spreadsheets using JavaScript.

== Integration and interoperability ==
EditGrid was available as a module on Netvibes, Pageflakes and Google Personalized Homepage. EditGrid was also available on Salesforce.com's AppExchange platform.

EditGrid also formed part of the offering of Central Desktop, ShareOffice and ThinkFree Office.

In addition, developers could make use of the EditGrid API to build custom applications. There were a number of EditGrid add-ons that mashed up other services. One of these, Grid2Map, turned longitude-latitude pairs into placemarks on Google Maps.

=== Multilingual ===
In addition to the default English version, EditGrid was available in eight languages: German, Spanish, French, Japanese, Dutch, Brazilian Portuguese, Simplified Chinese and Traditional Chinese, largely thanks to a community localisation project.

== Organization account ==
EditGrid was available to organisation users on a software-as-a-service basis. Organisation users were supported by SSL-encrypted traffic, user account administration and management reports on top of the features available to personal users. EditGrid organization accounts had become completely free-of-charge for all users since September 2009.

== Software architecture ==
EditGrid had been developed on an open-source software architecture. It ran on Catalyst as the web application framework and used Gnumeric as its back-end support. It adopted Ajax technology at the front-end.

== Acquisition ==
EditGrid was acqui-hired by Apple on 1 June 2008, for the iWork.com web applications development.
