= The 519 =

Non-profit agency of the City of Toronto

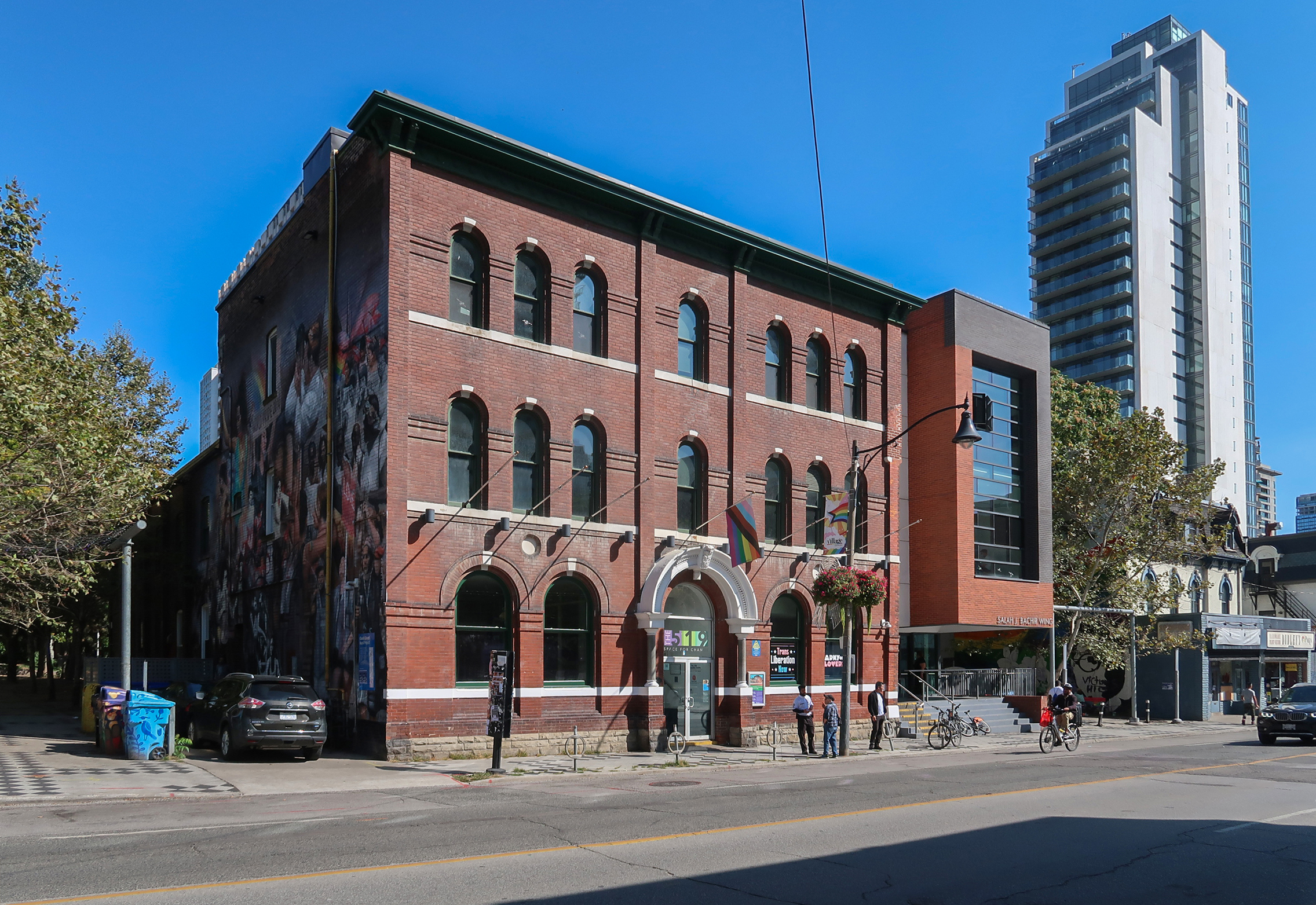
- Founded: Established 1975 (Opened 1976)
- Type: Charitable organization, Government agency
- VAT ID no.: 11931-0761-RR0001
- Location(s): 519 Church Street; Toronto, Ontario; M4Y 2C9
- Coordinates: 43.666°N 79.381°W
- Region served: Toronto
- Members: 10,000
- Employees: ~ 50 FTE
- Volunteers: 1,100
- Website: The519.org
- Formerly called: The 519 Church Street Community Centre

The 519, formerly known as The 519 Church Street Community Centre, is an agency by the City of Toronto. A Canadian charitable, non-profit organisation, it operates a community centre in the Church and Wellesley neighbourhood of Toronto, Ontario, Canada. The 519 serves both its local neighbourhood and the broader lesbian, gay, bisexual and transgender (LGBTQ) communities in the Toronto area. The 519 defines its local neighbourhood by a catchment area that spans from Bloor Street to the north to Gerrard Street to the south, and from Bay Street in the west to Parliament Street in the east.

According to the centre's website

The 519 is the hub of community life in Toronto's diverse Church and Wellesley Village. For over 35 years, The 519 has been working with [its] neighbours and [its] lesbian, gay, bi, trans and queer (LGBTQ) communities to build healthy, welcoming spaces to meet, participate and celebrate together.

== Governance model ==
The 519 is one of the City of Toronto's agencies and corporations, alongside organisations like Build Toronto, Exhibition Place and the Toronto Public Library. Led by a community board of directors, rather than the city's parks and recreations department, The 519 leverages community insight, knowledge and resources to determine usage of the building. In 2012, for every one dollar the City of Toronto provided to keep the building open and operational for the public, the 519 brought over two dollars in community investment to provide programming

=== Board of management ===
The 519's board of management includes the local Ward 13 councillor (Chris Moise) and 11 citizens. Citizen members of the board are elected by members of the 519 who are residents of the catchment area. The board of management is subsequently appointed by the Toronto and East York Community Council, a delegated body of Toronto City Council.

The board operates from a modified policy governance model which ensures delegation of day-to-day leadership of the organisation to the executive director, Maura Lawless. The board is currently led by chair Margo Foster, who currently manages academic programs at Seneca College.

=== Association of Community Centres ===
The 519 is a member of the Association of Community Centres (AOCCs), which comprises 10 volunteer board-run multi-purpose facilities providing a broad range of community, recreation and social service programs to residents in the local community. Other AOCC community centres include Swansea Town Hall, Ralph Thornton Community Centre and Waterfront Neighbourhood Centre (formerly known as Harbourfront Neighbourhood Centre).

The AOCC model is a hybrid between a city agency and an independent, not-for-profit, community-based organisation. The core administration activities are funded by the city and treated like a city agency (building maintenance and upkeep, utilities, etc.). Community programming is funded through fund-raising (corporate and individual donations, grants, etc.) and is led by the community-based Board of Management. The 519 is a member agency of the United Way of Greater Toronto and the Toronto Neighbourhood Centres and has received funding from various governments, corporations and foundations including the Community One Foundation and Government of Ontario.

Details of the relationship between the City of Toronto and AOCCs are outlined in a relationship framework approved by Toronto City Council in 2006.

== Programs and community services ==
The 519's governance model results in the development, evolution and creation of programs and services through community leadership and engagement. The centre offers staff-led programming funded through community investment as well as community-led initiatives that are volunteer-led.

=== Staff-led programs ===
The 519 offers a wide range of staff-led initiatives that serve a diverse community of members, including:

- Newcomer and Refugee Settlement Services
- Sport and Recreation Initiatives
- Community Drop-In Programs (Meal Trans, Sunday Drop-In)
- Community Support Services (Counselling, Anti-Violence)
- Trans Community Services (Trans Youth Mentorship Program, Trans Sex Worker Empowerment Project, Spark: Trans Youth Sports)
- Older LGBT Services (Senior Pride Network)
- Family and Children Services
- Queer Parenting Programs
- Social Enterprise Restaurant (FABARNAK)
- Research, Education and Training

=== Community-led programs ===
The 519 provides free meeting space and support for community member volunteers and community organisations to develop their own programs. In 2013, the 519 housed over 80 community led programs (in areas of community services, education, recreation, and self-help), and welcomed 250 regular user groups (in areas of community fundraising, recreation, professional associations and unions, social activists, social service organisations and tenants’ organizations). The 519 estimates in its 2012 annual report that approximately 35,000 individuals visited the centre over 200,000 times.

The 519 also actively supports a number of community-led partnerships such as the AIDS Candelight Vigil, the AIDS Memorial, and volunteer-led legal and tax clinics.

== Strategic initiatives ==
In addition to ongoing programs and services, the 519 invests organisational resources in a number of strategic initiatives and partnerships that help to create healthier more welcoming communities for its members:

=== Community sport and recreation centre ===
In November 2013, the 519 submitted a report to Toronto City Council seeking authorisation to develop a sport and recreation centre in the West Don Lands neighbourhood of Toronto. The new centre would provide space and services to the local neighbourhood while also providing a home for lesbian, gay, bi, trans (LGBT) sport leagues and recreational organisations in the city. It is believed that this would be the first LGBT athletic centre in the world. The proposal's early supporters include city councillor Pam McConnell, former Olympian and Hart House warden Bruce Kidd, and the Gay and Lesbian International Sport Association.

The report was adopted unanimously by the Community Development and Recreation Committee and was adopted on December 18, 2013, by Toronto City Council in a vote of 28-2 with Councillor James Pasternak and Mayor Rob Ford voting against the proposal. With this approval, staff of the City of Toronto and the 519 are now authorised to negotiate on a site for the new centre and to build a formal business case for approval by council at a later date.

=== The Village Study ===
The Village Study was a one-year urban and social planning exercise for the Church and Wellesley community that was funded by TD Bank Group and led by the 519 with the support of the Planning Partnership. Questions posed by the study included "What is the role of an ‘LGBTQ village’ in a modern, progressive city?" and "What must be done to support the Church-Wellesley Village to solidify its role as a major cultural community hub in the Toronto context now and into the future?" The final report of the Village Study is expected in early 2014 as the community prepares for World Pride.

=== PrideHouseTO ===
The 519 is the trustee of the PrideHouseTO initiative, a collaborative project of more than 15 community organisations working together to make the 2015 Pan American Games the most LGBT-inclusive multi-sport event in history. The PrideHouseTO leadership team includes organisations such as Toronto Metropolitan University, Egale Canada, the Gay and Lesbian International Sport Association and the Toronto chapter of PFLAG. As trustee, the 519 provides administrative and project management support to the volunteer-led initiative. PrideHouseTO is modeled after the Pride House movement which was founded in 2010 during the 2010 Winter Olympics.

== Capital expansion ==
In 2001, as use of the building reached capacity, the 519 undertook a process to raise money for a three-story addition to be built onto the existing structure. The 519's capital campaign, chaired by Salah Bachir, successfully raised money from the local community to fund the new wing. The addition of the Salah J. Bachir Wing and the renovation of the original building resulted in a 43 per cent increase in community space. The organisation celebrated a grand reopening on May 19, 2010.

== See also ==
- Church and Wellesley
- List of LGBT community centers
