= Ralph Thornton Community Centre =

Building in Toronto, Canada

Coordinates: 43.659174°N 79.347333°W

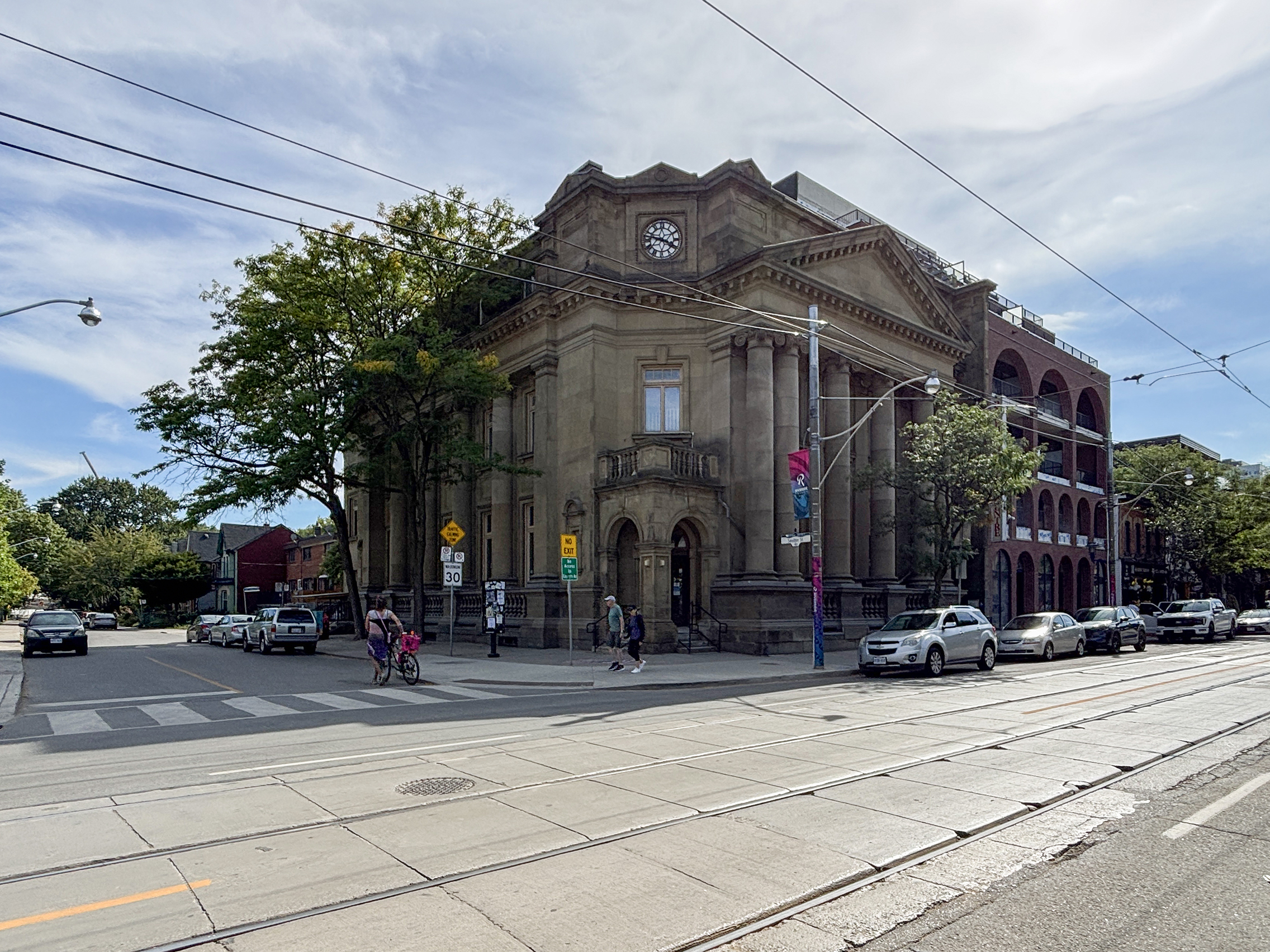
- Founded: Established ~1979-1980 (Opened February 14, 1981)
- Type: Government agency
- Purpose: Community Programs, Space Provision, Community Organizing
- Location(s): 765 Queen St. E Toronto, Ontario
- Key people: Ravi Yee Joshi, Executive Director
- Website: ralphthornton.org

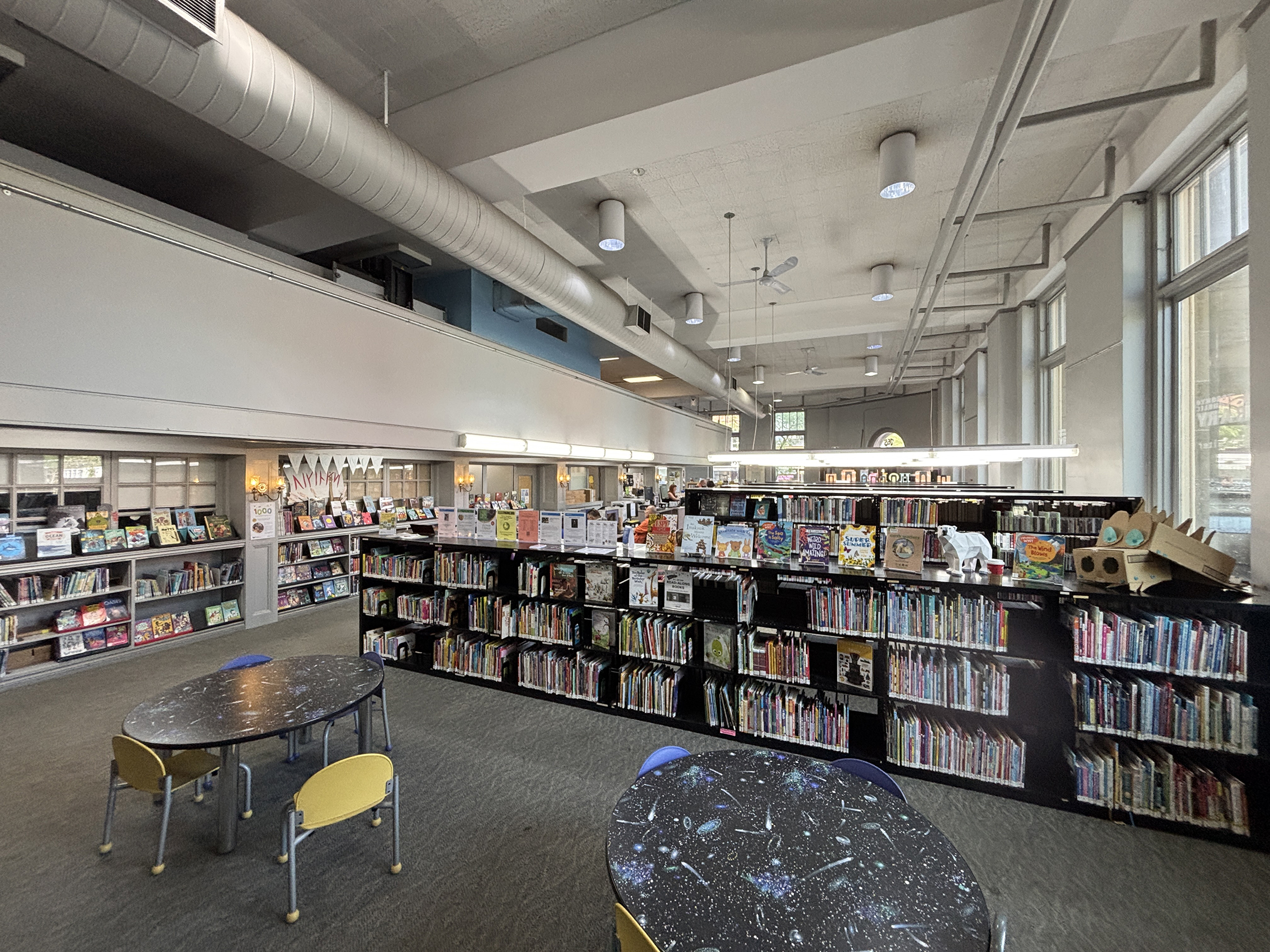
Toronto Public Library - QueenSaulter Branch

The Ralph Thornton Community Centre is a City of Toronto Agency and community centre located in the South Riverdale neighbourhood of Toronto, Canada.

Alongside its own community programs, the Centre today is home to the Queen/Saulter branch of the Toronto Public Library, The South Riverdale Child-Parent Centre, and offices for the Don Valley Community Legal Services.

It is named after Ralph Thornton, a taxi driver and prominent community activist in the Riverdale area.

== Governance model ==
=== Association of Community Centres ===
The Ralph Thornton Community Centre is a member of the Association of Community Centres (AOCCs), which comprises 10 volunteer board-run multi-purpose facilities providing a broad range of community, recreation and social service programs to residents in the local community. Other AOCC community centres include The 519, Swansea Town Hall, and Waterfront Neighbourhood Centre (formerly known as Harbourfront Neighbourhood Centre).

=== Ralph Thornton Community Organization ===
The centre operates alongside a charitable partner organization the Ralph Thornton Community Organization (or RTCO). A registered charity founded in 2001, the RTCO works to support the establishment, operation, programming, and projects undertaken by the RTCC and other community groups.

== 765 Queen St. E. ==
The neoclassical heritage structure was originally built by the federal government to house Postal Station G. Designed by one of Toronto's most noted architects E.J. Lennox, it opened in 1913. In 1979 it was leased to the city and converted into a community centre over a two-year process.
