= J. J. Kelso =

Irish-born Canadian newspaper reporter

John Joseph Kelso
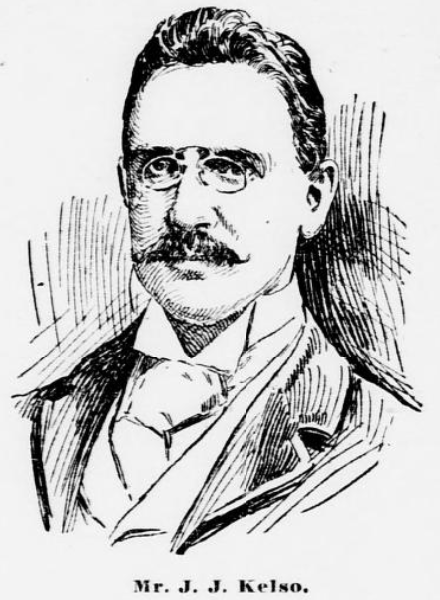
- Born: 31 March 1864; Dundalk, Ireland
- Died: 30 September 1935 (aged 71)
- Other name: J.J. Kelso
- Known for: advocating for children and animal welfare

John Joseph Kelso (31 March 1864 – 30 September 1935) was a newspaper reporter and social crusader who immigrated to Canada from Ireland with his family in 1874 when he was ten years old. They suffered hardships of hunger and cold in their early years in Toronto and, throughout his life, this motivated Kelso's compassion towards the poor and unfortunate.

While a reporter for the World and the Globe, Kelso founded the Toronto Humane Society in 1887 for the prevention of cruelty to children and animals, the Fresh Air Fund and the Santa Claus Fund in 1888 to provide excursions and cheer for poor women and children, and the Children's Aid Society (Canada) in 1891.

== Childhood and youth ==
Born in Dundalk, Ireland, midway between Belfast and Dublin. His father, George, made penniless through a fire in his starch manufacturing business, had decided to try his fortunes in Canada. His wife, Anna, and their six girls and three boys followed him to Toronto. The family immigrated to Canada when John was ten years old. In the fall of that year they suffered from hunger and cold resulting in J.J. helping his family's desperate situation by finding odd jobs and to pick up what bits of firewood he could find.

At age 11, he skipped school and got a job at James Bain's bookstore on King Street East. The ensuing years found him sometimes at John Street Public School or Ryerson Public School, sometimes a messenger for the Dominion Telegraph Company and sometimes a cash boy in Timothy Eaton's dry goods store.

At age 20, with a spotty school record, he enrolled at Jarvis Collegiate and, with the help of private tuition, graduated in one year. But he drew his skill as a writer and speaker from the many nights when, as a growing boy, huddled beside a coal oil lamp for light and warmth, he studied the bible and Shakespeare.

As a journalist, he saw first-hand the misery of the street children of his day – youngsters often only five or six years old selling newspapers or begging for money so their parents could pay for drink. He was indignant that these children were being educated for a life of crime and that nobody seemed to care.

In 1887, he wrote an article in his paper about this and the need for an organisation that would prevent cruelty to children as well to the workhorses that pulled the wagons and streetcars on which the city was dependent for its livelihood. Encouraged by the positive response, he founded the Toronto Humane Society to address these issues.

== The Crusading Journalist ==
J.J. followed his journalistic dreams for some years, starting as a printer's apprentice. Soon he had the job of proofreader at The World, a Toronto newspaper. In his spare time he wrote articles for the paper without remuneration and became expert at reading and writing shorthand. This led to his promotion to police reporter.

His success as a reporter led eventually to a job at The Globe, also a Toronto newspaper.

At The Globe he exposed the circumstances under which the poor, particularly poor children, lived. His interest in this issue arose from an incident he witnessed when he was 14 years old. He had watched in bewilderment as five of his companions were arrested for petty theft and thrown into jail with hardened adult offenders. This event remained with J.J. throughout his life and led him to campaign against the inadequacy of legislation to deal with children's misdemeanours.

Later, as a reporter, he saw children selling newspapers on the street, only to have their earnings taken by their parents for drink. Working nights, he often talked to homeless children living on the streets and what he saw and learned from them added to his knowledge about the misery of the lives of many Toronto's young people.

== The Children's Advocate ==
When John Joseph Kelso retired in 1934, the New York Survey said: "We propose him for Canada's Hall of Fame. If she hasn't a Hall of Fame, we propose that she establish one for him."

Fame had beckoned J.J. when, at age 14, while eating his lunch on Front Street in Toronto, he saw the acclaimed George Brown, editor of The Globe, on his arrival at Union Station. J.J. vowed then that one day he would occupy that chair but his dream was abandoned when, at age 29, he accepted the post of the first provincial Superintendent of Neglected and Dependent Children in Ontario. From 1893 until his retirement in 1934, he directed the establishment of children's aid societies and played a key role to their integration into other provinces. He also advocated for special juvenile courts, mothers' allowances and the legalisation of adoption, and was active in closing reformatories and organizing playgrounds. After 1895 he was recognised as Canada's leading expert in child welfare and gloried in the title the "children's friend."

Fame found him but it was not of his seeking. During the years preceding his acceptance of that post, and the 41 years he served in it, he did more to change the lot of children, not only in Canada but also in the United States and Britain, than any other person in Canadian history.

A persuasive speaker and a convincing writer, J.J.'s perception, ideas and energies worked on behalf of children – from fresh air outings to protection from adult laws.

== The "Child Saver" ==
J.J.'s ideas about protecting, or to use the language of the day "saving", children began with these incidents. He had little sympathy for parents who exploited their children but he was optimistic that, if warned about the consequences, they would change. Yet he had compassion for the need of parents and children to get away from the hardships of their daily lives.

To this end, in 1888, he sent out notices announcing a movement to start a Fresh Air Fund that would provide excursions to the Toronto Island and to lakeside parks. In the first five years, 30,000 children benefited and the idea was carried to Britain. Christmas entertainments and gifts were also arranged. In 1897, free admission of children to the CNE was secured as part of the Fresh Air Fund, which was eventually taken over by the Toronto Star newspaper.

J.J. had, however, tackled problems earlier than that. In 1886, following discussions with the city clerk, an amendment to the Municipal Act was enacted to provide for licensing and regulation of newsboys and other children in street trades. It prohibited those less than eight years of age from engaging in street occupations. For this, newspapers called him "Tagger Kelso" and "the enemy of the newsboy", from his desire to have children selling newspapers wear identification tags. As always through his life, J.J. was impervious to such criticism.

== The Humane Society ==
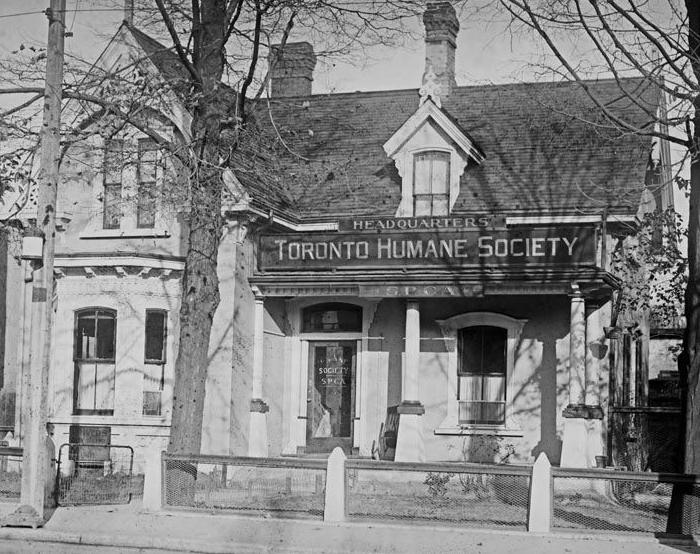
Toronto Humane Society's old building

He was now in the public eye. W.F. Maclean, editor of The World, had received a letter from John Kidston MacDonald, a prosperous dry goods merchant prominent in charitable activities, complaining about the lack of a society for the prevention of cruelty to animals. This letter was sent to J.J. as something else for him to write about. He took the suggestion seriously. John J. Kelso published the letter in the newspaper and added his own personal comment; "Why," he asked, "don't we have a society for the prevention of cruelty?".

In response, money started to roll in for the establishment of such an organisation. J.J., however, began to envision a society oriented towards the prevention of all types of cruelty, including children as well as animals. A personal experience strongly influenced him.

Walking along Yonge Street late one night in November 1886, he came across two sobbing children, a brother and a sister. They told him that their father had promised them a severe beating unless they could beg at least 25 cents that night. So far their tally was only 15 cents. J.J. took pity on them and searched for three hours to find a charitable institution to take them in for the night. The parents were charged the next morning with neglect but the case was dismissed by the judge on the basis that there were insufficient grounds for prosecution .

Shortly afterwards, the secretary of the Canadian Institute, where reform issues were often discussed, jocularly asked him to speak. J.J. took advantage of the opportunity and, on 19 February 1887, delivered a paper whose title was "The necessity of a society for the prevention of cruelty in Toronto". He called for a non-denominational humane society with a broad set of objectives to include both children and animals. His paper was received enthusiastically.

Encouraged, J.J. began to set up such a humane society in 1887; for whom he became treasurer in 1918 a position he held until 1935. J.J. cooperated with the police towards the protection of both children and animals.

== Children's Aid Society ==
The support for the idea was positive, so J.J. followed up with a meeting on 18 July 1891 called to establish in Toronto a Children's Aid Society and Fresh Air Fund. Its objectives were many and here J.J. brought all his ideas together – a shelter for neglected children, adequate schools for the poor, separate treatment for juvenile offenders and more youth clubs and playgrounds.

The meeting passed a motion to form such a society and J.J. was elected its first president. Though he resigned six months later due to pressure of work – he was still a reporter at The Globe – he achieved his emergency shelter, which opened in 1892 at 18 Centre Street. John Kidston MacDonald, the dry goods merchant, replaced him as president.

== The Children's Charter ==
The need for child welfare reform was now well established in the public mind and among politicians. In 1893, two years after the founding of the Children's Aid Society and Fresh Air Fund, the government introduced a bill, known as "The Children's Charter", that provided for the establishment of children's aid societies across the province and ushered in the modern era of child welfare legislation.

In May of that year, J.J. Kelso, Globe reporter and president of the press gallery of the legislature, watched with joy as the Act for the Prevention of Cruelty to and Better Protection of Children was passed. Given his expertise in child protection, Premier Mowat appointed him to the position of Superintendent of Neglected and Dependent Children provided for in the act. Thus, J.J. gave up his journalistic ambitions to follow the dictates of his conscience.

== The Settlement House movement ==
In 1911 Kelso, along with Arthur Burnett, George Bryce, Elizabeth Neufeld and others co-founded Central Neighbourhood House the second such organisation in Toronto at the time. Kelso served as CNH's first chair. Settlements were intended to bridge the chasm between rich and poor by bringing workers into urban slums to live communally with those they intended to help. They challenged the notion of 19th century charities by working alongside the poor and disenfranchised as neighbours and friends, in an "illustration of social equality and democracy" Central Neighbourhood House continues to thrive in Toronto's downtown east end.

== Death ==
In the last years of his life Kelso's hearing and health were beginning to fail him and in 1930 he was diagnosed with liver cancer; which lead to his death on 30 September 1935.
