= Bnei Akiva Schools of Toronto =

Private Jewish schools in Ontario, Canada

Coordinates: 43°44′43.3″N 79°26′54.1″W

Yeshivat Or Chaim & Ulpanat Orot
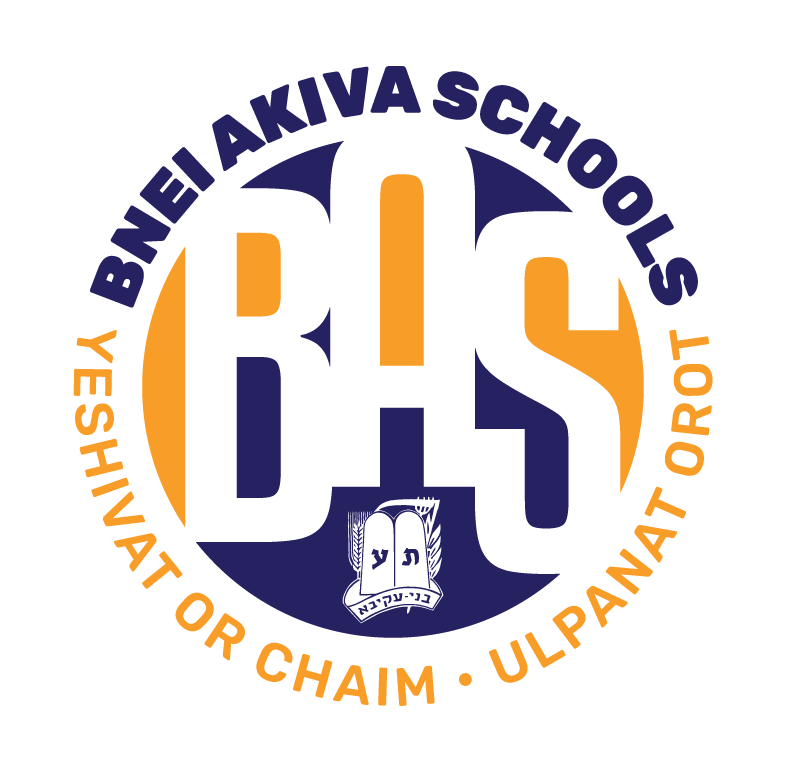
- BAS Toronto logo

Location
- Or Chaim – 159 Almore Ave., M3H 2H9; Ulpanat Orot – 45 Canyon Ave., M3H 3S4; Toronto, Ontario; Canada

Information
- School type: Jewish Private
- Religious affiliations: Modern Orthodox, Religious Zionism
- Founded: Yeshivat Or Chaim (1973); Ulpanat Orot (1975)
- Head of School: Rabbi Dr. Seth Grauer
- Grades: 9–12
- Language: English, Hebrew
- Colours: Blue, Gold, White
- Team name: YOC Knights, UO Knights
- Website: www.bastoronto.org
- Last updated: 2020

The Bnei Akiva Schools of Toronto (BAS Toronto) consist of two Modern Orthodox Jewish high schools, namely Ulpanat Orot girls school (Hebrew: אולפנת אורות) and Yeshivat Or Chaim boys school (Hebrew: ישיבת אור חיים) that are affiliated with Bnei Akiva, located in Toronto, Ontario, Canada.

== Educational philosophy ==
Yeshivat Or Chaim (founded 1973) and Ulpanat Orot (founded 1975) are both accredited high schools that strongly with the religious Zionist movement. Students are encouraged to regard Israel as the center of their spiritual and religious lives, and to spend the year after graduating learning in Israel at religious higher learning institutions. Yeshivat Or Chaim is the only Bnei Akiva yeshiva located outside of Israel.

== Curriculum ==
Both schools have a dual curriculum of Judaic and general studies for grades 9 through 12. General studies classes are held in English, and Hebrew studies classes are taught in both English and Hebrew.

== Additional programs ==
Chessed Program: Bnei Akiva Schools has been running a charity program since the beginning of its establishment, named after "Chesed"; from the Hebrew חסד "kindness. Activities have included "Pink Day", involving charity and wearing pink, for the sake of breast cancer awareness.

== Athletics ==
All Bnei Akiva Schools teams go by the team name "Knights". Or Chaim has a varsity and junior varsity basketball team that plays in the TDCAA. The Ulpana Knights play in the private school league and compete in basketball and volleyball. Ulpana also offers one-day soccer and tennis tournaments to compete representing the Knights or competing in single or double games, respectively. Or Chaim also has a soccer team, a cross country squad and runs basketball intramurals during lunchtime, which is organized by the convenor. During the 2015–2016, 2016–2017, 2017–2018, 2022-2023, and 2023-2024 school years, the schools had sent a team to run the Jerusalem Marathon for the organization SHALVA.

== Post High School ==
Following four years at Bnei Akiva Schools, many students attend Yeshivot and Seminaries in Israel for a gap year. Some of these institutions include Yeshivat Torat Shraga, Yeshivat Torah V'Avodah, Yeshivat HaKotel, Yeshivat Har Etzion, Yeshivat Sha'arei Mevaseret Tzion, Yeshivat Orayta, Yeshivat Reishit and Yeshivat Lev HaTorrah.
