= Team and Concepts =

Hong Kong web development company

Team and Concepts Limited
- Company type: Private
- Industry: web-based software
- Founded: Hong Kong (2003)
- Headquarters: Hong Kong
- Key people: David K. F. Lee, Co-founder and Chairman
- Products: EditGrid
- Website: http://www.tnc.hk/

Team and Concepts (TnC) is a Hong Kong–based company founded by David K. F. Lee and others in 2003. It is known as the provider of the Web 2.0 online spreadsheet, EditGrid.

TnC was founded in 2003 in the height of SARS by a group of young entrepreneurs still in their university studies. It started as an information service provider for event organisers; its first product, PEM, was an award-winning web-based event scheduling software. In early 2006, upon securing the Hong Kong Government's funding from the Innovation and Technology Fund, it moved into the Web 2.0 business and launched EditGrid to public in April 2006. One of TnC's Founders was nominated by BusinessWeek as one of the 20 Asia's Best Entrepreneurs under 25 in August 2006.

In June 2007, EditGrid announced a $1.25 million series A investment from the WI Harper Group.

== See also ==
- EditGrid
