= Toronto Neighbourhood Centres =

Toronto Neighbourhood Centres (TNC) is an association of multi-service nonprofit neighbourhood centres located in communities across Toronto, Ontario, Canada. The current association includes 30 member agencies that provide supports to residents of their local geographic neighbourhoods, including social services, opportunities for association and enabling collective action to improve community conditions. Based on a historic "settlement house" model, these modern neighbourhood centres hold great promise for revitalizing community in a global era (see Yan, Miu Chung "Bridging the Fragmented Community: Revitalizing Settlement Houses in the Global Era", 2004 in Journal of Community PracticeVolume: 12 Issue: 1/2).

The TNC was founded in 1998, emerging from the Toronto Association of Neighbourhood Services (TANS). TANS was established in the early 1950s as an association of six (and later seven) multi-service settlement houses located in the former City of Toronto. The first settlement houses were established in Toronto between 1894 and 1914, and included Fred Victor Centre (1894), University Settlement Recreation Centre (1910), Central Neighbourhood House (1911) and St. Christopher House (1912). All of these organizations are still active members of the current Toronto Neighbourhood Centres association. The settlement movement began in 1883 with the establishment of the first settlement house, Toynbee Hall in London, England.
