= List of Jewish cemeteries in the Greater Toronto Area =

This is a list of Jewish cemeteries in the Greater Toronto Area (GTA), including dedicated Jewish cemeteries, consecrated Jewish sections within non-denominational cemeteries, and burial grounds operated by Jewish congregations, landsmanshaftn, mutual aid societies, and communal organizations.

== List ==
Name	City/Region	Neighborhood/Municipality	Opened/Closed	Affiliation	Ownership	Notes	Ref.
Bathurst Lawn Memorial Park	Toronto	Newtonbrook, North York	1929	various	various	Founded by Ivansker Mutual Benefit Society. Made up of 55 separate cemeteries owned by various congregations and landsmanshafts (mutual aid or fraternal societies)	
Beit Olam Garden, Glenview Memorial Gardens	York Region	Woodbridge	2018	Reform/unaffiliated	Arbor Memorial	Consercated Jewish section of a non-denominational cemetery. Allows burial of interfaith couples and cremation. Includes sections for Holy Blossom, Danforth Jewish Circle, Shir Libeynu and other liberal congregations.	
Beth Tzedec Memorial Park	Toronto	Westminster-Branson, North York	1949	Conservative Judaism	Beth Tzedec Congregation	Succeeded the earlier Jones Avenue Cemetery in Leslieville.	
Beth Zion Oshawa section, Mount Lawn Memorial Gardens	Durham Region	Whitby	1980s	independent (traditional, egalitarian)	Arbor Memorial	Beth Zion is a longstanding, independent congregation in Oshawa, Ontario, founded in 1910. Prior to establishing a consecrated section at Mount Lawn, the congregation used Bathurst Lawn and Mount Sinai cemeteries in Toronto.	
Dawes Road Cemeteries	Toronto	Clairlea, Scarborough	1898	various	various	Made up of 34 cemeteries operated by various congregations and landsmanshafts, and societies.	
Holy Blossom Memorial Park	Toronto	Cliffcrest, Scarborough	1929	Reform Judaism	Holy Blossom Temple	Created to succeed the Pape Avenue Cemetery which became full in the 1930s. Limited number of regular plots remain available to both members and non-members. Cremation plots are also available.	
Jones Avenue Cemetery	Toronto	Leslieville, Toronto	1883	Orthodox/Conservative	Beth Tzedec Congregation and Jewish Cemeteries Management Inc.	Toronto's second oldest Jewish cemetery. Founded by Chevra Kadisha Chesed Shel Emes and used by the Tarauley, Chestnut Street, Goal Tzedec and other Orthodox synagogues. Part of the property was sold to the Goel Tzedec Congregation around 1919, which became Beth Tzedec Congregation in 1952. Cemetery is locked. Limited plots remain available.	
Lambton Hills Cemetery (Bais-Oilom)	Toronto	Humber Valley Village, Etobicoke	1910	various	various, managed by Roselawn Lambton Cemetery Association	Founded by Knesseth Israel congregation. Made up of 14 cemeteries operated by various congregations, landsmanshafts, and societies. Includes a section for interfaith couples.	
McCowan Road Cemetery (Shaarei Shomayim)	Toronto	Cliffcrest, Scarborough	1933	Modern Orthodox	Shaarei Shomayim	Founded by Machzikei B'nai Israel Synagogue along with other Jewish organizations as adjoining cemeteries. Acquired by Shaarei Shomayim in 1980 when the synagogues merged and also consolidated the other land parcels.	
Mount Sinai Memorial Park	Toronto	Downsview, North York	1920	various	various, managed by Mount Sinai Cemetery Association	Made up of 23 cemeteries owned by various congregations and societies.	
Mount Zion Garden, Highland Hills Funeral Home & Cemetery	York Region	Gormley, Stouffville	2018	various	Arbor Memorial	Jewish section of a non-denominational cemetery. Allows burial of interfaith couples and cremation.	
Oraynu Congregational Cemetery, Elgin Mills Cemetery	York Region	Richmond Hill	2006	Humanistic Judaism	Mount Pleasant Group	Jewish section of a non-denominational cemetery. Allows burial of interfaith couples and cremation. Interment rights owned by Oraynu Congregation for Humanistic Judaism	
Pape Avenue Cemetery (Holy Blossom)	Toronto	Leslieville, Toronto	1849—1940s	Orthodox/Reform	Holy Blossom Temple	First Jewish cemetery in Toronto. Maintained by Holy Blossom but no burials since around the 1940s.	
Pardes Chaim Cemetery	York Region	Maple	2010	various	Toronto Hebrew Memorial Parks	Largest Jewish cemetery in Canada. Includes sections for various congregations and mutual aid societies as well as community sections. Interment of cremated remains not permitted.	
Pardes Shalom Cemetery	York Region	Vaughan	1977	various	Toronto Hebrew Memorial Parks	Includes sections for various congregations and mutual aid societies as well as community sections. Interment of cremated remains not permitted.	
Roselawn Avenue Cemetery	Toronto	Forest Hill, Toronto	1906	various	various, managed by Roselawn Lambton Cemetery Association	Made up of 23 cemeteries owned by various congregations and landsmanshafts. Founded to accommodate Jews living outside of the then-city limits of Toronto.	
Temple Har Zion section, Duffin Meadows Cemetery	Durham Region	Pickering	late 1990s	Reform	Mount Pleasant Group	Consecrated Jewish section used primarily by Temple Har Zion congregation, based in Markham, Ontario.	
Jewish community section, Meadowvale Cemetery	Peel Region	Brampton	1981	Reform	Mount Pleasant Group	Used by Solel and Har Tikvah Reform congregations and includes community section for unaffiliated Jews.	
Beth Jacob Cemetery	Halton Region	Aldershot (Snake Road), Burlington	1887	Conservative	Beth Jacob Congregation (Hamilton)	The original Jewish cemetery for the Hamilton area. Includes the newer Stanley Sobol section (est. 2004) and the former Grand Order of Israel Cemetery.	
Adas Israel Cemetery	Halton Region	Aldershot (Old York Road), Burlington	1913	Orthodox	Adas Israel Congregation (Hamilton)	Located opposite the Gate of Heaven Catholic Cemetery. Contains four distinct sections.	2
Grand Order of Israel (GOI) Section	Halton Region	Aldershot (Snake Road), Burlington	1926	Independent	Grand Order of Israel Lodge	Located adjacent to and across the tracks from Beth Jacob. Dedicated to the GOI fraternal organization.	3
Shaarei-Beth El Section, Trafalgar Lawn Cemetery	Halton Region	Clearview, Oakville	1965	Reform	Town of Oakville (managed by Shaarei-Beth El)	A dedicated Reform section within a municipal cemetery. Allows for interfaith burials.	4
