= Mount Sinai Memorial Park (Toronto) =

Jewish cemetery in Toronto, Ontario

Coordinates: 43°43′51″N 79°28′32″W

- Interactive map of Mount Sinai Memorial Park

Details
- Established: 1920
- Location: Toronto, Ontario
- Country: Canada
- Type: Jewish cemetery
- Owned by: Various synagogue and mutual benefit associations

Mount Sinai Memorial Park is a Jewish cemetery in Toronto, Ontario, Canada. Located at 986 Wilson Avenue in the city's former North York district, it is one of the oldest and largest Jewish burial grounds in Toronto.

The cemetery was established in 1920 and is composed of sections owned or administered by individual synagogues, landsmanshaftn, benevolent societies, and Jewish community organizations. The grounds are managed collectively through the Mount Sinai Cemetery Association, which provides maintenance and burial services for the site.

== History ==
Mount Sinai Memorial Park was founded during a period of rapid growth in Toronto's Jewish population in the early 20th century. Jewish congregations and mutual aid societies established dedicated burial sections within the cemetery to serve members of their communities.

Over time, the cemetery expanded to include sections affiliated with numerous synagogues and organizations, including Shaarei Shomayim Congregation, Workmen's Circle, Farband, and Jewish War Veterans groups.

The cemetery remains an important burial and memorial site for Toronto's Jewish community and continues to operate under a board structure representing the various affiliated organizations and congregations.

== Layout and administration ==
Mount Sinai Memorial Park is divided into multiple independently administered sections. The Mount Sinai Cemetery Association coordinates grounds maintenance, interment services, unveilings, and other operational matters for the cemetery as a whole.

An assembly hall located on the grounds is used for funeral services, unveilings, and memorial gatherings.

== War graves ==
The cemetery contains the graves of several Canadian military personnel commemorated by the Commonwealth War Graves Commission from the Second World War.

== Notable burials ==
- Harvey Hart (1928–1989), television and film director and producer.
- Mel Lastman (1933–2021), businessman, founder of Bad Boy Furniture, mayor of Toronto (1998–2003), and mayor of North York (1973–1998).
- Howard Moscoe (1939–2026), Toronto city councillor and former chair of the Toronto Transit Commission.
- Randy Starkman (1960–2012), Canadian sports journalist.
- Harold Sumberg (1905–1994), violinist, teacher, conductor, and adjudicator.
- Sam Sniderman (1920–2012), businessman and founder of the Sam the Record Man retail chain.

== See also ==
- List of Jewish cemeteries in the Greater Toronto Area
- List of cemeteries in Toronto
- Beth Tzedec Memorial Park
- Toronto Hebrew Memorial Parks
