= History of the Jews in Toronto =

Jewish Canadians in the Greater Toronto area

Jews in Toronto (Canada)
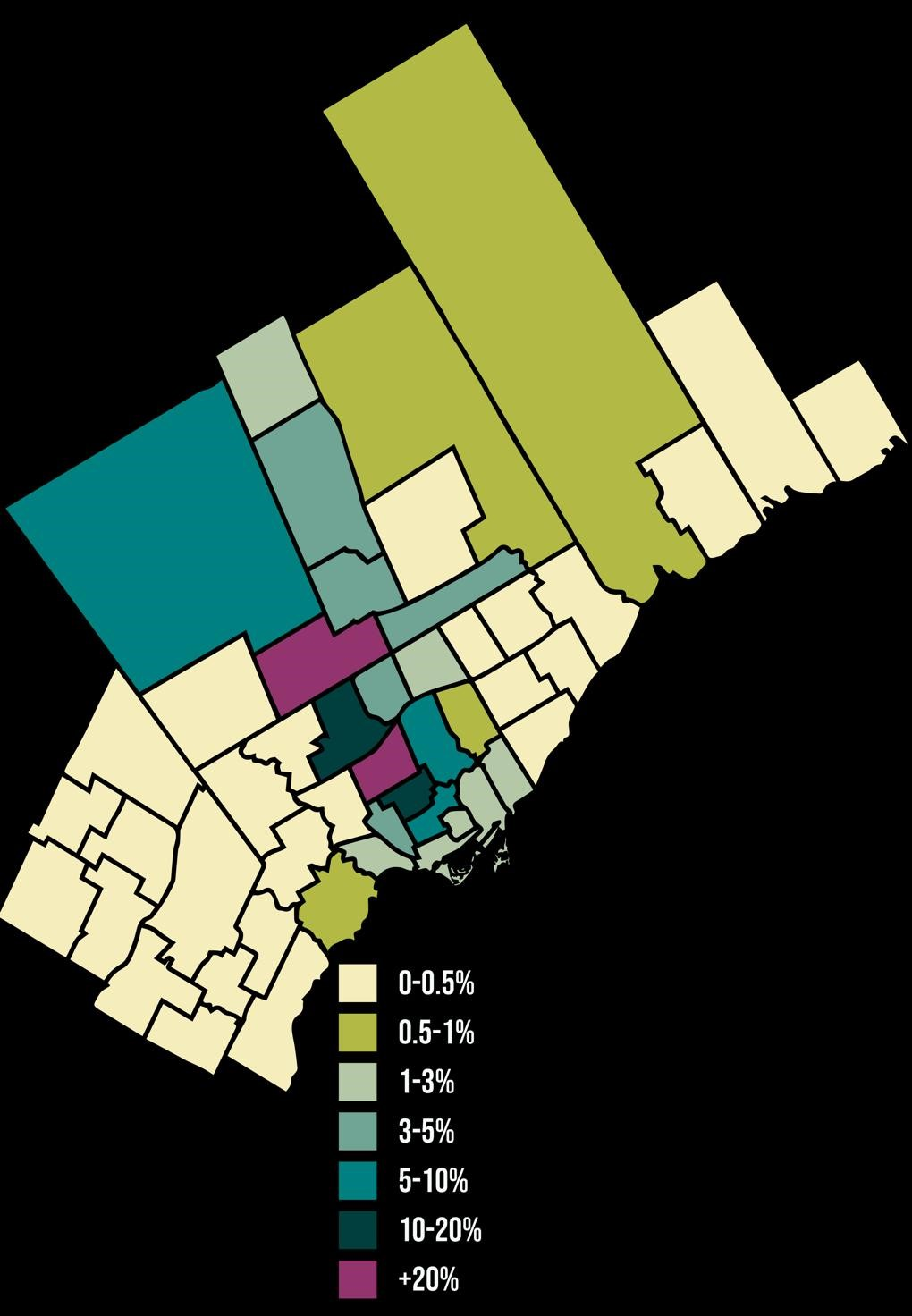
- Population distribution of Jewish Canadians in Toronto by federal electoral district, 2021 census

Total population
- 165,765; 2.7% of the total Toronto CMA population (2021)

Languages
- Canadian English • Canadian French; Other Languages of Canada

Related ethnic groups
- History of the Jews in Montreal • History of the Jews in Vancouver

Toronto's Jewish community is the most populous and one of the oldest in the country, forming a significant part of the history of the Jews in Canada. It numbered about 240,000 in the 2001 census, having overtaken Montreal in the 1970s. As of 2011, the Greater Toronto Area is home to 188,710 Jews. The community in Toronto is composed of many different Jewish ethnic divisions, reflecting waves of immigration which started in the early 19th century. Canada's largest city is a centre of Jewish Canadian culture, and Toronto's Jews have played an important role in the development of the city.

== History ==
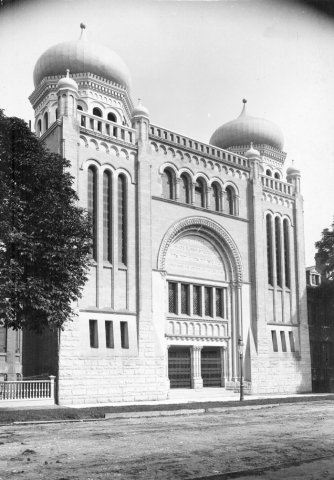
Holy Blossom Temple on Bond Street, 1900

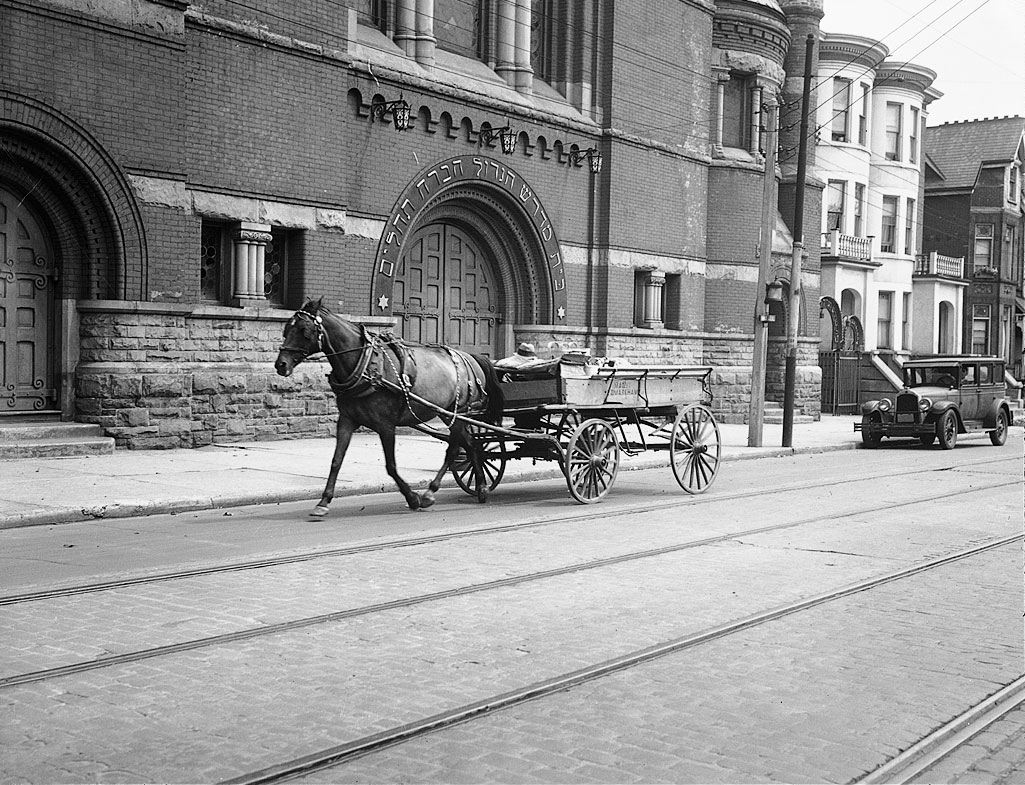
Horse-drawn wagon in front of Beth Hamidrash Hagadol–McCaul Street Synagogue, c. 1920

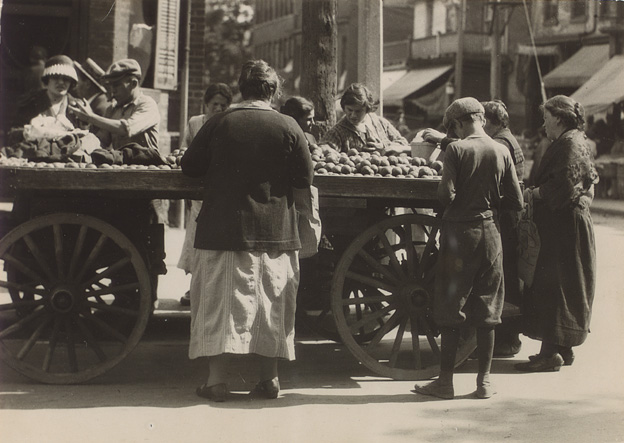
Jewish market, Kensington Avenue, 1924

The earliest record of Jewish settlement in York is an 1817 communication between colonial offices. The report indicated that several weddings had taken place, one of which was Jewish. However, the first permanent Jewish presence in Toronto began in 1832, with the arrival of Arthur Wellington Hart, the Harts being among the most established Jewish families of British North America. By 1846, the census indicated that 12 Jews lived in Toronto, with the number doubling the following year. The first Jewish cemetery was established in 1849 and Toronto's first synagogue, the Toronto Hebrew Congregation, was founded in 1856.

In the late nineteenth and early part of the twentieth century, the Jewish community and other non-British immigrants were densely concentrated in "The Ward" between College Street, Queen Street, Yonge Street and University Avenue.

Mendel Ryman, who immigrated to Toronto from Jezierna, a town in the Austrian Empire, in 1903, built the first Jewish bathhouse and mikvah (shvitz) on Centre Avenue.

Members of the Toronto Jewish community bought land and established the Oakdale Golf & Country Club in 1926 in response to antisemitism in Canada that strictly excluded Jews from private golf clubs, including the Rosedale Golf Club.

Toronto's Jews generally centred themselves in distinct neighbourhoods and ethnic enclaves. By the 1930s, the largest concentration of Jews had moved west from "The Ward" to Kensington Market, with Jews representing upwards of 80% of the population. Between Queen and Bloor Streets, toward Dovercourt, Jews established a distinct domicile, forming the ethnic majority in many areas. Often, employment opportunities determined the areas in which the Jews settled, as in the case of the Spadina district, a hub of the textile industry.

With the election of the first Parti Québécois government in 1976 and the looming prospect of Quebec independence, many members of Montreal's largely anglophone Jewish community migrated to Toronto. As a result, Canada's epicentre of Jewry effectively moved to Toronto. Simultaneously, Toronto Jews left the crowded confines of the ethnic neighbourhoods within the city's core, retreating to the near suburbs along Bathurst Street.

In the 1990s and early 2000s, many Jews from the former Soviet Union (FSU) immigrated to Canada, approximately 70% of whom chose to settle in Greater Toronto.

== Demographics ==
In 1871, 157 Jews lived in Toronto, rising to 1,425 by 1891 and 3,090 by 1901. The community grew in the wake of immigration from Europe, where Jews suffered from persecution and pogroms. By 1911, the Jewish population of Toronto had grown to 18,237. The number almost doubled by 1921. In 1931, 45,000 Jews were living in Toronto, mostly Polish Jewish immigrants. After 1924, when the United States imposed immigration restrictions, Toronto attracted a growing number of Jewish immigrants. On the eve of World War II, the Canadian government also restricted immigration. As a result, only small groups of Austrian and German Jews fleeing Hitler found a safe haven in Toronto during this period. In 1941, the Jewish population was 49,046, comprising the largest ethnic minority in Toronto.

Data from 2011 National Household Survey shows 188,710 Jews living in the Greater Toronto Area, comprising nearly half of the nation's Jews.

Data from the 2021 Canadian census for the city of Toronto (not including all parts of the Greater Toronto Area) shows 74,080 individuals reporting their ethnic or cultural origin as Jewish, and 99,390 reporting it as their religion.

== Religious and cultural institutions ==
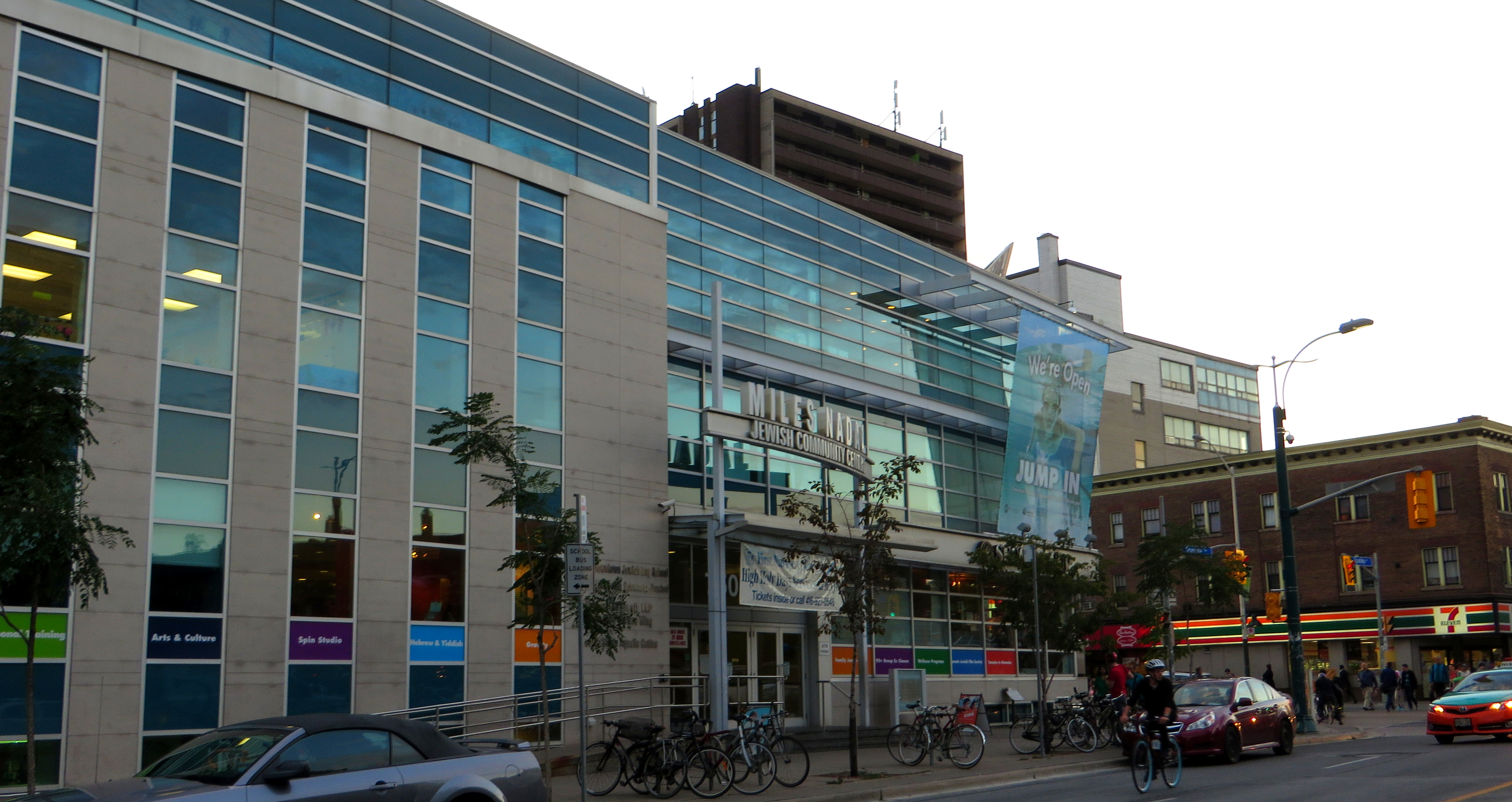
The Miles Nadal JCC, 2022

In 1849, Abraham Nordheimer purchased land for a cemetery on behalf of the Toronto Hebrew Congregation, an Orthodox synagogue that became known as the Daytshishe Shul. In 1856, Lewis Samuel of York, England helped to found the Sons of Israel Congregation, which merged with Toronto Hebrew Congregation in 1858. In the 1920s, the synagogue became a Reform synagogue, joining the Union of American Hebrew Congregations. As Jews fleeing the pogroms in Czarist Russia in the 1880s began to settle in Toronto, three new synagogues were established. Goel Tzedek and Beth Hamidrash Hagadol Chevra Tehillim, founded by Russian Jews in 1883, and Shomrei Shabbos, founded in 1888 by Jews from Galicia, Poland. In 1889, two more congregations were established: Beth Jacob, known as the Poylishe Shul, and Adath Israel, founded by Romanian Jews.

For ten years, Shomrei Shabbos was housed in rented buildings along Richmond Street. The first permanent synagogue was on Chestnut Street. A year later, the first rabbi was brought to Toronto, Rabbi Joseph Weinreb of Busk, Galicia. In 1933, the synagogue moved to a larger building that could seat 300 on the corner of Brunswick and Sussex.

In the decades leading up to World War I, the community established Jewish afternoon schools, theatres, a newspaper, and mutual-aid societies.

A chevra kadisha had existed in Toronto with the establishment of the first Jewish cemetery in 1849. As a result of government regulation of the funeral industry in 1922, requiring the use of licensed funeral homes, H. Benjamin and Sons funeral home (now Benjamin's Park Memorial Chapel) was established on Spadina Avenue in 1922 and followed by the Toronto Hebrew Funeral Parlour (now Steeles Memorial Chapel) in 1927.

== Neighbourhoods ==
Bathurst Street has been the heart of the Jewish community of Toronto for many decades. Since the early twentieth century, Jews have lived around Bathurst Street south of Bloor Street, east to Spadina Avenue (particularly in the Kensington Market district) and west to beyond Christie Pits. After World War II, wealthier members of the community moved to Forest Hill. Today, much of the Jewish community resides along the street from north of St. Clair Avenue to south of Wilson Avenue and beyond the city limits at Steeles Avenue, extending from Steeles north until Elgin Mills Road in Richmond Hill.

Since the early 1970s, the northern stretch of Bathurst has become one of the centres of the Russian Jewish community in Toronto. The electoral district of York Centre has the largest number of Russo-Canadian voters in Canada. Due to the large number of Russian delicatessens, restaurants, and book and clothing stores, the neighbourhood has been nicknamed "Little Moscow."

=== Eruvin ===
Toronto has two eruvin for the purposes of Sabbath and Yom Kippur observance: one in the central area (though excluding downtown) and one in the north end, which extends to Thornhill; these two eruvin are connected under Highway 401 at Bathurst Street, Wilson Avenue, and Bayview Avenue. Richmond Hill has a separate eruv as well.

The original eruv was downtown, but because its boundaries could not be agreed upon, it is not recognized by the majority of Shabbat-observant Jews in Toronto. Chabad of Downtown Toronto, for example, states that there is no eruv in downtown Toronto.

== Notable Jewish residents ==
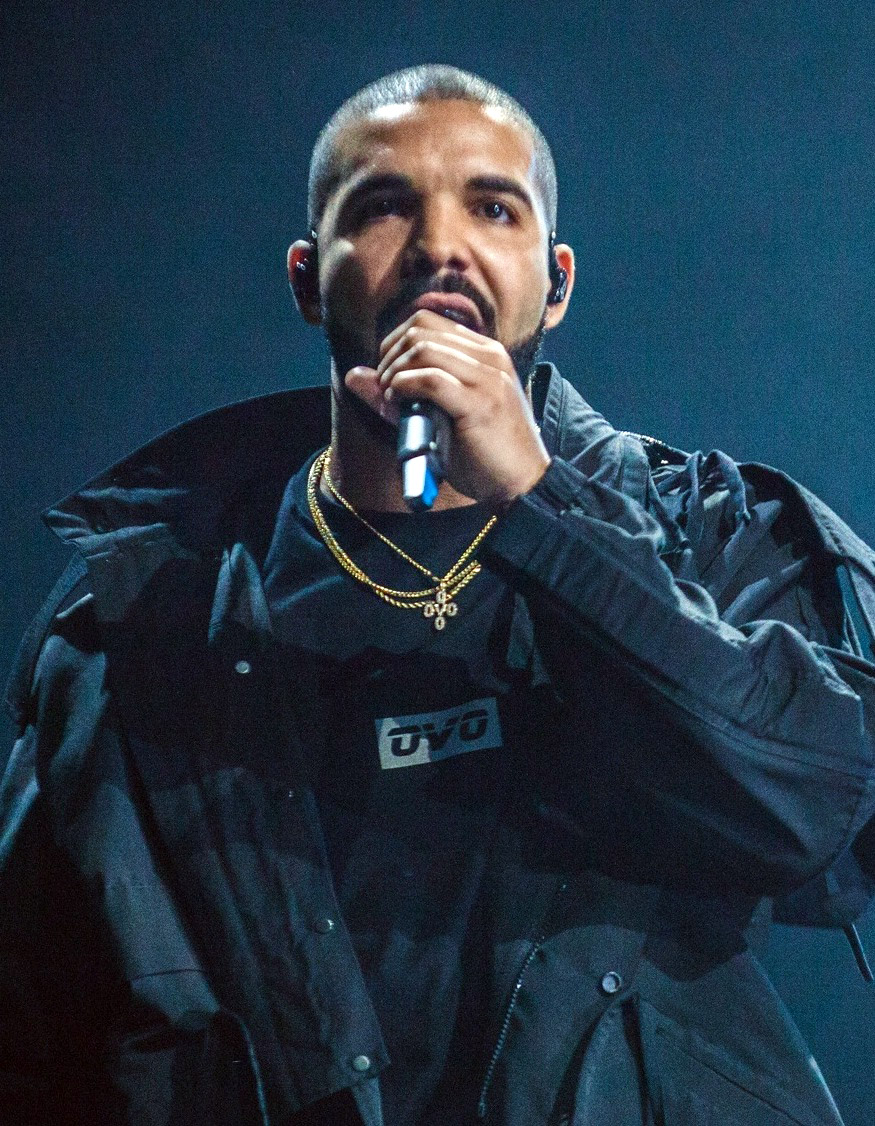
Drake

- Judy Feld Carr – human rights activist
- Drake – musician
- Philip Givens – ex-Mayor of Toronto
- Paul Godfrey – ex-Chair of Metro Toronto
- Joe Mimran - Designer
- Kenny Hotz and Spencer Rice – television personalities and comedians
- Mel Lastman – ex-Mayor of Toronto and North York
- Geddy Lee – musician
- Stephen Lewis - politician and diplomat
- Sammy Luftspring - boxer
- Ed Mirvish – businessman, impresario
- Nathan Phillips – ex-Mayor of Toronto
- Albert Reichmann - Canadian businessman
- Larry Tanenbaum - Canadian businessman
- Sam Yuchtman – radio personality
- Howie Mandel - comedian

== See also ==
- History of the Jews in Canada
- Bathurst Jewish Community Centre
- Christie Pits riot
- List of synagogues in the Greater Toronto Area
