= Beth Tzedec Memorial Park =

Jewish cemetery in Toronto, Canada

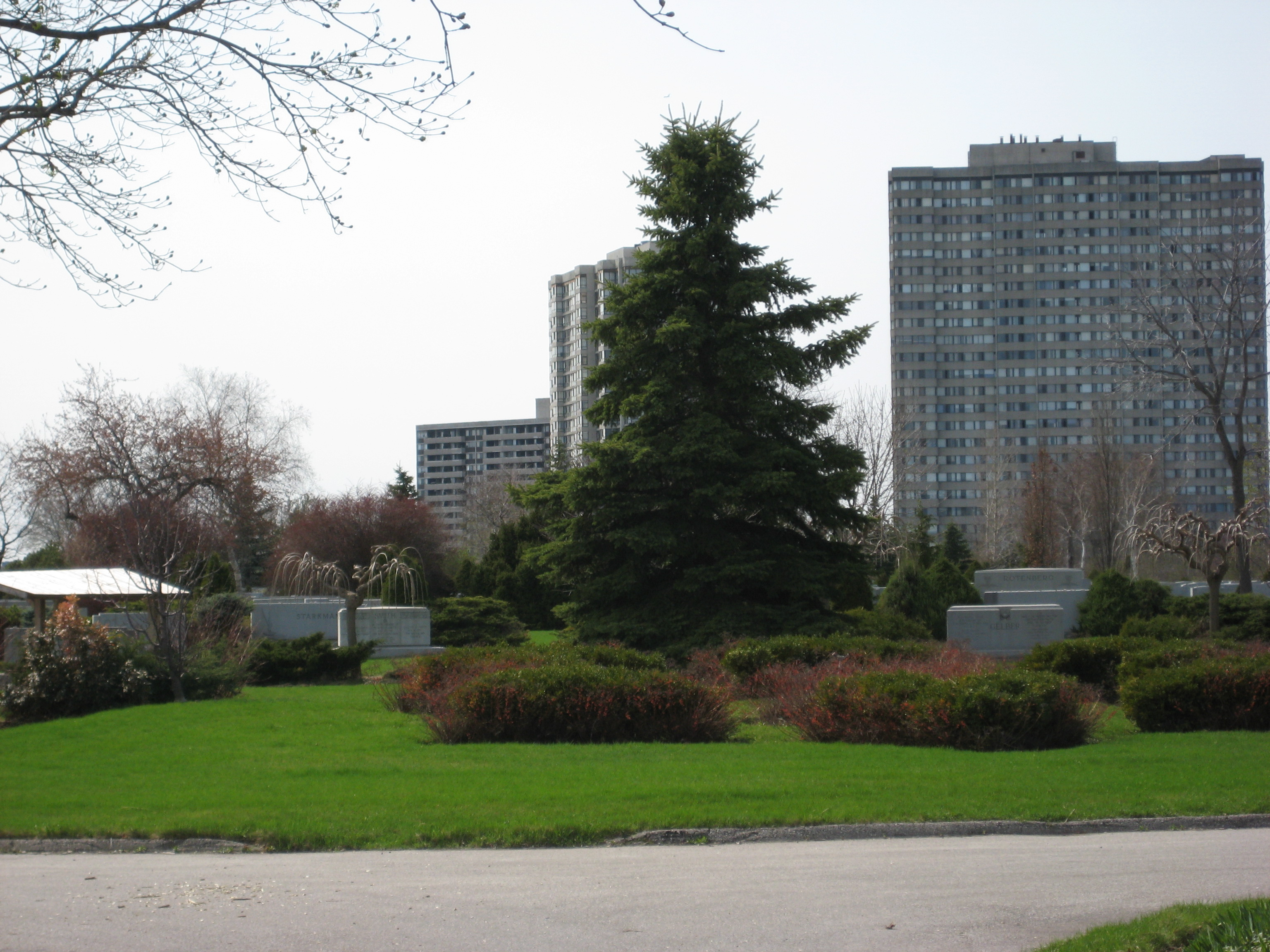
- Interactive map of Beth Tzedec Memorial Park

Details
- Established: 1949
- Location: 5822 Bathurst Street, Westminster–Branson, Toronto
- Country: Canada
- Coordinates: 43°46′41″N 79°26′45″W
- Type: Jewish cemetery
- Owned by: Beth Tzedec Congregation
- Website: Official website
- Find a Grave: Beth Tzedec Memorial Park

Beth Tzedec Memorial Park is a Jewish cemetery on Bathurst Street in Toronto, Ontario, Canada.

Established in 1949 by the Beth Tzedec Congregation, the cemetery is located next to Westminster Cemetery, Westminster Memorial Park and G. Ross Lord Reservoir.

== Notable burials ==
- David Croll – First Jewish senator, federal MP, Ontario MLA/MPP and Cabinet minister, first Jewish cabinet minister anywhere in Canada, Mayor of Windsor, Ontario
- Samuel Factor - first Jewish federal MP from Ontario, judge
- Philip Givens – Mayor of Toronto, federal MP and judge
- Allan Grossman – Ontario MPP and cabinet minister
- Larry Grossman – Ontario MPP and cabinet minister, Progressive Conservative Party leader; son of Allan Grossman
- Bob Kaplan – MP and federal cabinet minister
- Cec Linder – actor, played "Felix Leiter" in the James Bond film Goldfinger
- Jack Rabinovitch – philanthropist, businessman and founder of Giller Prize
- Goodwin "Goody" Rosen – businessman, minor and later major league All Star baseball player with Brooklyn Dodgers and New York Giants
- Peter Rosenthal - Mathematics professor and civil rights lawyer

== Jones Avenue Cemetery ==
Jones Avenue Cemetery
- Interactive map of Jones Avenue Cemetery

Details
- Established: 1856
- Closed: 1910
- Location: 466 Jones Avenue, Toronto, Ontario
- Country: Canada
- Coordinates: 43.6757°N 79.3389°W
- Type: Jewish cemetery
- Owned by: Beth Tzedec Congregation
- Find a Grave: Jones Avenue Cemetery

In 1883, Jones Avenue Cemetery opened at 480 Jones Avenue in Riverdale by Chevra Kadisha Chesed Shel Emes, Toronto's non-profit Orthodox Jewish burial society. The cemetery was also used by the Tarauley Street and Chestnut Street Synagogues as well as Goel Tzedec. Around 1919, part of the cemetery was sold to Goel Tzedec which later joined the Conservative Judaism movement and merged with Beth Hamidrash Hagadol in 1952 to become Beth Tzedec Congregation. Chevra Kadisha Chesed Shel Emes later became defunct and its portion of the cemetery is now operated by Jewish Cemeteries Management Inc., a non-profit agency founded to assume responsibility for Jewish cemeteries whose owners have become defunct or moribund.

== Notable burials ==
- Joseph Weinreb, Toronto's first Orthodox Jewish rabbi.

== See also ==
- Beth Tzedec Congregation
- Pape Avenue Cemetery
- Dawes Road Cemetery
- Pape Avenue Cemetery
- List of Jewish cemeteries in the Greater Toronto Area
