= Pardes Shalom Cemetery =

Jewish cemetery in Vaughan, Ontario, Canada

- Interactive map of Pardes Shalom Cemetery

Details
- Established: 1977
- Location: 10953 Dufferin Street, Vaughan, Ontario, Canada
- Country: Canada
- Coordinates: 43.88399°N 79.49181°W
- Type: Jewish cemetery
- Owned by: Toronto Hebrew Memorial Parks
- Size: 89 acres (36 ha)
- No. of graves: 30,000+
- Website: thmp.ca
- Find a Grave: Pardes Shalom Cemetery

Pardes Shalom Cemetery is a Jewish cemetery in Vaughan, Ontario, Canada. Opened in 1977, it is one of the largest Jewish cemeteries in the Greater Toronto Area and is owned and operated by Toronto Hebrew Memorial Parks (THMP), a community-owned not-for-profit organization serving the Jewish community of the Toronto region. The cemetery occupies approximately 89 acres (36 ha) on Dufferin Street north of Major Mackenzie Drive. It is the sister cemetery to Pardes Chaim Cemetery, which is also owned and operated by THMP.

== History ==
The origins of Pardes Shalom Cemetery can be traced to the efforts of lawyer and community leader Sidney Freedman, who advocated for a community-owned Jewish cemetery to serve Toronto's rapidly growing post-war Jewish population. In 1970, Freedman acquired the land that would become Pardes Shalom and began the process of rezoning it for cemetery use. Two years later he established Toronto Hebrew Memorial Parks and donated the property to the community.

Pardes Shalom opened in 1977 and became the first cemetery operated by Toronto Hebrew Memorial Parks. The cemetery was designed with sections reserved for synagogues, congregations, landsmanshaftn, and other Jewish organizations while remaining under centralized ownership and management by THMP.

In 1999, Pardes Shalom barred Malvern Jacobs from being buried in the cemetery as Jacobs had converted to Christianity and become a Messianic Jewish minister and dean of Canada Christian College's Jewish Studies department. Pardes Shalom locked its gates to prevent Jacobs's casket and his funeral procession of 400 mourners from entering the cemetery.

As burial space at Pardes Shalom diminished, THMP opened the larger Pardes Chaim Cemetery in 2010. Nevertheless, Pardes Shalom remains an active burial ground and one of the principal Jewish cemeteries serving the Greater Toronto Area.

== Organization and customs ==
Like many Jewish cemeteries in Ontario, Pardes Shalom contains sections affiliated with specific congregations and organizations. Unlike some older Toronto-area Jewish cemeteries, however, Toronto Hebrew Memorial Parks retains ownership and management responsibility for all sections, ensuring long-term maintenance regardless of the status of any affiliated congregation or society.

The cemetery follows traditional Jewish burial practices. Interment of cremated remains is not permitted, and burial is generally restricted to individuals recognized as Jewish by birth or conversion in accordance with THMP policies.

A memorial garden on the cemetery grounds provides a place of remembrance for individuals who are not buried at the cemetery or whose graves are located elsewhere.

== Notable burials ==
- Bluma Appel, philanthropist and arts patron
- Harvey Atkin, actor
- David Caplan, provincial cabinet minister
- Corey Haim, actor
- Marvin Goldhar, actor
- Phyllis Gotlieb, science fiction novelist
- Paul Kligman, actor
- Stephen Lewis, leader of the Ontario New Democratic Party (1970-1978), Canadian Ambassador to the United Nations (1984-1988), UN official, and founder of the Stephen Lewis Foundation
- Ed Mirvish, entrepreneur, founder of Honest Ed's, theatre owner and impresario
- Harry Rasky, documentary filmmaker
- D. Geoffrey Shulman, founder of DUSA Pharmaceuticals
- Morton Shulman, politician, author, physician, and chief coroner of Ontario
- Patti Starr, fundraiser and writer
- Al Waxman, actor and director

== See also ==
- Toronto Hebrew Memorial Parks
- Pardes Chaim Cemetery
- List of Jewish cemeteries in the Greater Toronto Area
