= D. Geoffrey Shulman =

Canadian dermatologist and pharmaceutical executive (1954–2012)

David Geoffrey Shulman
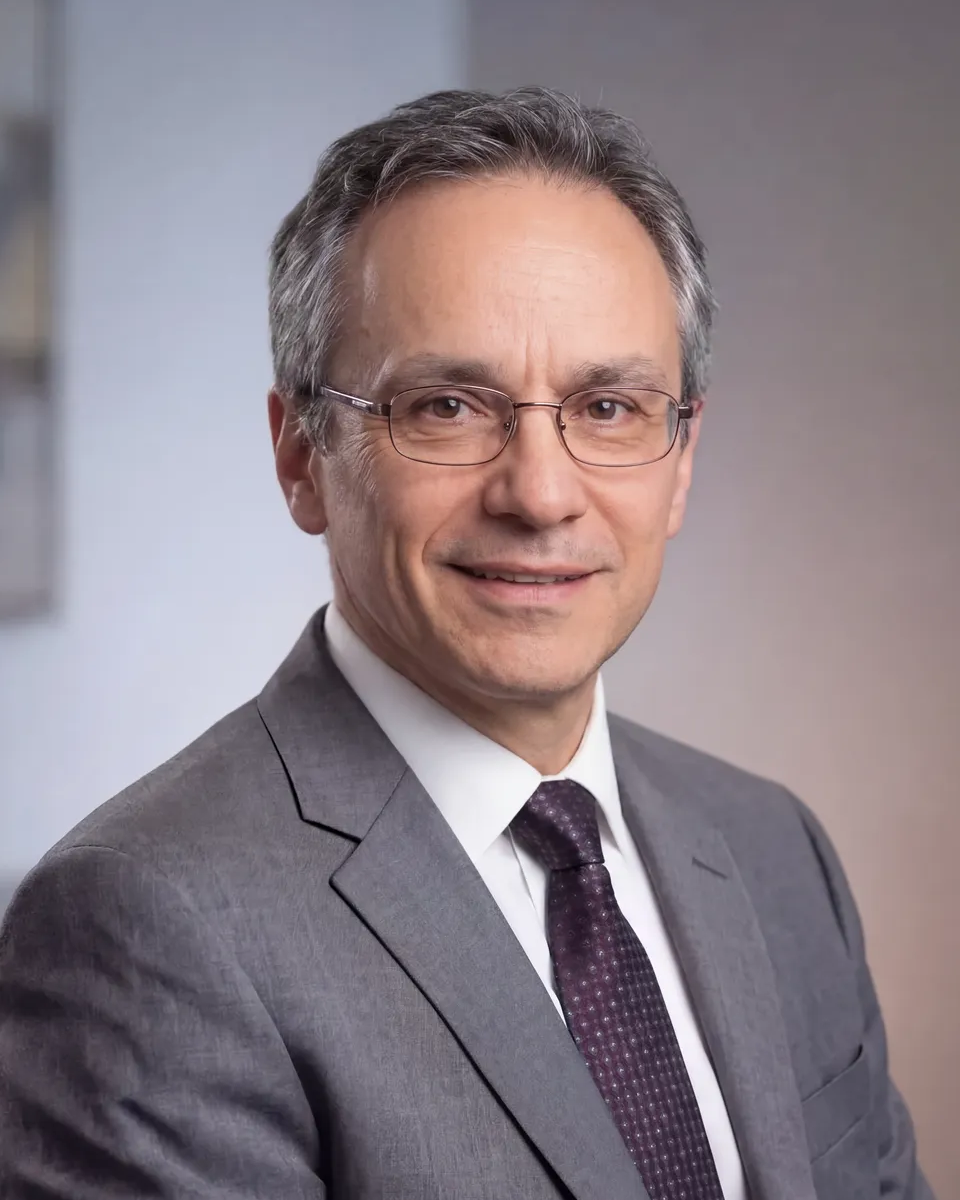
- Born: July 8, 1954; Toronto, Ontario, Canada
- Died: July 2, 2012 (aged 57); Toronto, Ontario, Canada
- Resting place: Pardes Shalom Cemetery
- Other name: Geoffrey Shulman
- Occupations: Dermatologist and pharmaceutical executive
- Known for: Founder of DUSA Pharmaceuticals; commercialization of Levulan photodynamic therapy
- Title: Chairman, president and chief executive officer of DUSA Pharmaceuticals
- Spouse: Charlene Linzon
- Children: 5
- Parent(s): Morton Shulman and Gloria Shulman
- Relatives: Dianne Saxe (sister)

David Geoffrey Shulman (July 8, 1954 – July 2, 2012) was a Canadian dermatologist and pharmaceutical executive. He founded DUSA Pharmaceuticals and served as its chairman, president and chief executive officer, leading the commercialization of Levulan photodynamic therapy, a treatment using aminolevulinic acid and blue light. In 1999, Levulan became the first topical photodynamic therapy approved in the United States for the treatment of actinic keratosis.

== Early life and family ==
Shulman was the son of Morton Shulman, the Ontario coroner, politician and pharmaceutical entrepreneur, and Gloria Shulman (née Bossin). His sister is the environmental lawyer and Toronto city councillor Dianne Saxe.

== Career ==
Shulman was a Fellow of the Royal College of Physicians of Canada (FRCPC) and practised dermatology in Toronto, where he ran a clinic in the Forest Hill neighbourhood alongside his pharmaceutical work.

=== DUSA Pharmaceuticals ===
In 1991, Shulman attended a lecture by James C. Kennedy on the use of photodynamic therapy to treat skin cancer. Kennedy and Roy Pottier, researchers at Queen's University and the Royal Military College of Canada, had developed a method combining topical aminolevulinic acid with visible light to target cancerous and precancerous cells. Shulman subsequently established DUSA Pharmaceuticals as a United States company to commercialize the treatment, and DUSA licensed the technology from Queen's University.

DUSA developed the technology into the Levulan photodynamic therapy platform, which combined a topical aminolevulinic acid treatment with a blue-light illuminator. In 1999, the company signed a marketing and development agreement with Schering AG worth up to US$30 million, granting Schering rights to market Levulan for dermatological uses in the United States, Europe and other markets outside Canada. The FDA approved Levulan for the treatment of actinic keratoses in December 1999, and the Levulan Kerastick and BLU-U light source were launched in the United States in September 2000.

In June 2007, Robert F. Doman was elected chief executive officer, while Shulman remained chairman of the board and became chief strategic officer. In April 2008, DUSA announced that Shulman's role would change because of a serious illness. In December, the company replaced his employment agreement with a part-time consulting arrangement, citing his health.

=== Selected publication ===
Marcus, S. L.; Sobel, R. S.; Golub, A. L.; Carroll, R. L.; Lundahl, S.; Shulman, D. G. (April 1996). "Photodynamic therapy (PDT) and photodiagnosis (PD) using endogenous photosensitization induced by 5-aminolevulinic acid (ALA): current clinical and development status". Journal of Clinical Laser Medicine & Surgery. 14 (2): 59–66. doi:10.1089/clm.1996.14.59. PMID 9484077.

== Personal life and death ==
Shulman was married to dermatologist Charlene Linzon. They had five children, and Shulman was a masters swimmer with the Toronto Masters Swim Team.

Shulman died at his home in Toronto on July 2, 2012, after a four-and-a-half-year illness with an abdominal gastrointestinal stromal tumor. A service was held at Holy Blossom Temple and he was buried at Pardes Shalom Cemetery.
