= Beth Tzedec Congregation =

Conservative synagogue in Toronto, Ontario, Canada

- Hebrew: בית צדק, lit. 'House of Righteousness'
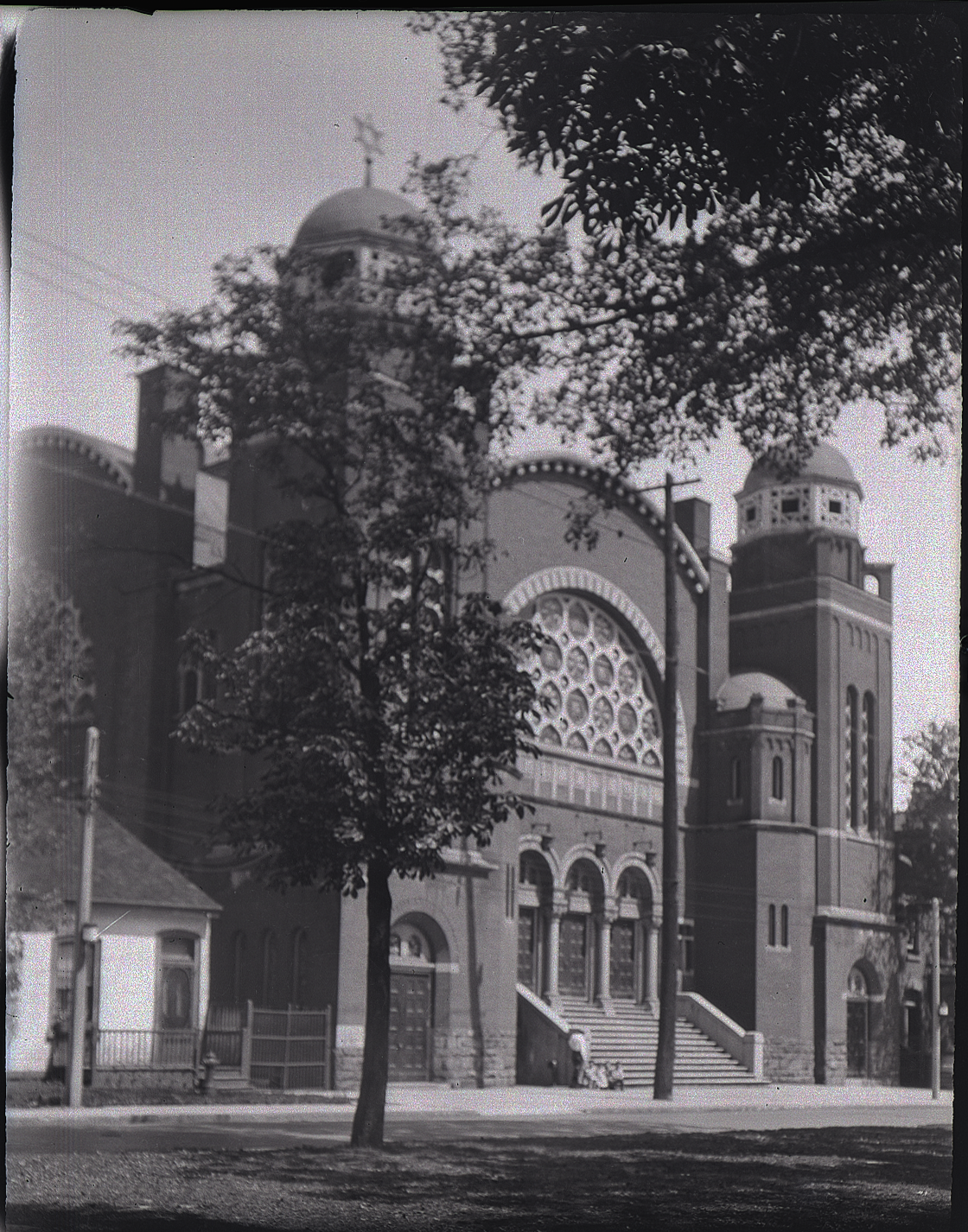
- Goel Tzedec Synagogue, 1924

- Location in Toronto

Religion
- Affiliation: Conservative Judaism
- Rite: Ashkenazi
- Ecclesiastical or organisational status: Synagogue
- Governing body: United Synagogue of Conservative Judaism
- Leadership: Rabbi Baruch Frydman-Kohl (emeritus); Rabbi Steve Wernick (senior rabbi); Rabbi Robyn Fryer Bodzin
- Status: Active

Location
- Location: 1700 Bathurst Street, Toronto, Ontario
- Country: Canada
- Coordinates: 43.6954689°N 79.4243774°W

Architecture
- Architect: Peter Dickinson
- Type: Synagogue
- Established: 1883; 143 years ago
- Completed: 1955; 71 years ago

Website
- beth-tzedec.org

Beth Tzedec Congregation (Hebrew: בית צדק, lit. 'House of Righteousness') is a Conservative synagogue on Bathurst Street in Toronto, Ontario, Canada. It was founded in 1955 with the amalgamation of the Goel Tzedec (Hebrew: גואל צדק, lit. 'Righteous Redeemer') and Beth Hamidrash Hagadol Chevra Tehillim (Hebrew: בית המדרש הגדול חברה תהלים, romanized: The Great House of Prayer of the Congregation of Psalms) congregations, established respectively in 1883 and 1887. The synagogue has some 2,600 member units, representing over 4,400 members, and is the largest Conservative congregation in North America.

== History ==
=== Early years ===
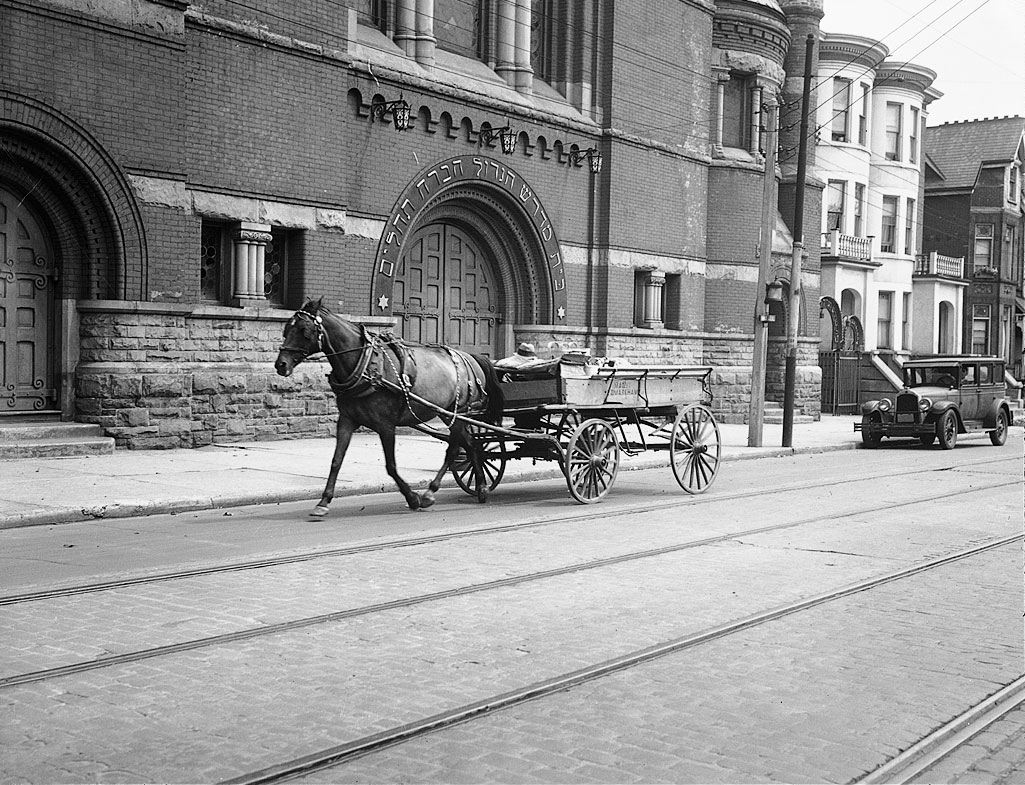
Beth Hamidrash Hagadol, c. 1920

The Goel Tzedec ('Righteous Redeemer') congregation was founded in October 1883 by (primarily Litvak) Eastern European Jewish immigrants to Toronto, as an Orthodox alternative to the Reform Holy Blossom Temple. The synagogue purchased the building of a former church at University Avenue and Elm Street the following year. Meanwhile, some of its members (mainly Russians and Galitzianers) left in 1887 to establish a new synagogue, Chevra Tehillim ('The Congregation of Psalms').

In 1905, Goel Tzedec appointed as spiritual leader the Volozhin Yeshiva graduate Rabbi Jacob Gordon, who would serve as senior rabbi until his death in November 1934. That same year, a building site on University Avenue near Armoury was purchased, and the new building was dedicated in February 1907. With seating for 1,200, the synagogue, designed by architect William Limberry Symons, was the largest in the city. In 1905, Chevra Tehillim purchased the New Richmond Methodist Church on McCaul Street, designed by architects Smith & Gemmel, and was renamed Beth Hamidrash Hagadol Chevra Tehillim ('The Great House of Prayer of the Congregation of Psalms'; informally the 'McCaul Street Synagogue').

Goel Tzedec adopted English-language sermons in 1913, while Chevra Tehillim did so only in the 1920s (and only on High Holy Days). The former joined the Conservative movement in 1925, though it retained most of its traditional practices. Among other changes, insistence on decorum during the service, the seating of women on the main floor, a new prayer book, and the addition of some English prayers were introduced at Goel Tzedec in the mid-1930s.

As Toronto Jewry began moving further north, Goel Tzedec in 1946 purchased the synagogue's current site on Bathurst in York Township. In 1949, it established with the McCall Street Synagogue what would become the Beth Tzedec Memorial Park. The congregation held Canada's first bat mitzvah ceremony in 1950.

=== Amalgamation to present ===
Goel Tzedec and Beth Hamidrash Hagadol amalgamated in 1952 to form the Beth Tzedec Congregation, and in December 1955 dedicated their new building, designed by architect Peter Dickinson of the consulting firm Page and Steele.

Judy Feld Carr became Beth Tzedec's first female president in 1983. The synagogue began granting aliyahs to women in the mid-1990s. It has counted women as part of its minyans since 2011.

Beth Tzedec briefly withdrew from the United Synagogue of Conservative Judaism in 2008, but rejoined in 2014.

== In popular culture ==
Beth Tzedec was featured prominently in the 2023 Adam Sandler film, You Are So Not Invited to My Bat Mitzvah.

== See also ==
- Beth Tzedec Memorial Park
- History of the Jews in Toronto
