= Pardes Chaim Cemetery =

Jewish cemetery in Vaughan, Ontario, Canada

- Interactive map of Pardes Chaim Cemetery

Details
- Established: 2010
- Location: 11818 Bathurst Street, Vaughan, Ontario
- Country: Canada
- Coordinates: 43.91139°N 79.47452°W
- Type: Jewish cemetery
- Owned by: Toronto Hebrew Memorial Parks
- Website: thmp.ca
- Find a Grave: Pardes Chaim Cemetery

Pardes Chaim Cemetery is a Jewish cemetery in Vaughan, Ontario, Canada. Opened in 2010, it is owned and operated by Toronto Hebrew Memorial Parks (THMP), a community-owned not-for-profit organization serving the Jewish community of the Greater Toronto Area. Located on Bathurst Street north of Elgin Mills Road, the cemetery was established to provide additional burial capacity for the Toronto region after THMP's earlier Pardes Shalom Cemetery began nearing capacity. Pardes Chaim is the largest Jewish cemetery in the Greater Toronto Area.

== History ==
The origins of Pardes Chaim Cemetery lie in the long-range planning of Toronto Hebrew Memorial Parks. By the early 2000s, burial space at Pardes Shalom Cemetery in Vaughan was becoming increasingly limited. THMP therefore acquired and developed a second cemetery property on Bathurst Street, one mile north of Pardes Shalom, to meet the future burial needs of the Greater Toronto Area's Jewish community.

Pardes Chaim officially opened in 2010. At approximately 200 acres (81 ha), it was designed to become one of the largest Jewish cemeteries in Canada, with capacity for between 70,000 and 90,000 burial plots. The cemetery continues the organizational model used at Pardes Shalom, with sections designated for congregations, landsmanshaftn, mutual aid societies, and community burial sections for individuals who are not affiliated with a participating organization.

== Administration ==
Pardes Chaim is administered by Toronto Hebrew Memorial Parks, which retains ownership and management responsibility for all sections within the cemetery. This differs from many older Jewish cemeteries in the Toronto area, where individual sections are owned and maintained by separate congregations or organizations. The centralized ownership model was adopted to ensure perpetual maintenance and to prevent cemetery sections from becoming abandoned if affiliated organizations cease to exist.

The cemetery follows traditional Jewish burial practices. Cremated remains are not interred at the cemetery, and burial eligibility is generally restricted to individuals recognized as Jewish under THMP policies.

== Features ==
Pardes Chaim contains sections affiliated with numerous synagogues and Jewish organizations throughout the Greater Toronto Area. The cemetery is located at 11818 Bathurst Street in Vaughan, approximately two miles north of Elgin Mills Road.

== Notable burials ==
- Bonnie Burstow (1945–2020), feminist academic
- Cayle Chernin (1947–2011), actress, writer, and producer.
- Marvin Elkind (1934–2024), boxer, police informant, and organized crime figure.
- Max Haines (1936–2017), crime writer and newspaper columnist.
- Deanna Kamiel (1946–2018), documentary filmmaker

== See also ==
- Toronto Hebrew Memorial Parks
- Pardes Shalom Cemetery
- List of Jewish cemeteries in the Greater Toronto Area
