= Roselawn Avenue Cemetery =

Cemetery in Toronto, Ontario, Canada

Coordinates: 43.70638°N 79.42021°W

- Interactive map of Roselawn Avenue Cemetery

Details
- Established: 1906
- Location: 619 Roselawn Avenue; Toronto, Ontario, Canada
- Type: Jewish cemetery
- Owned by: Roselawn-Lambton Cemetery Association
- No. of graves: 10,000
- Find a Grave: Roselawn Avenue Cemetery

Roselawn Avenue Cemetery is a Jewish cemetery located in Forest Hill, Toronto.

Opened in 1906, Roselawn is one of several Jewish cemeteries in Toronto, and was established to serve the Jewish community outside of what was then the city limits. It was created on land purchased and donated to the Chesed Shel Emes (Hebrew Free Burial Society) by Samuel Weber, a member of the Goel Tzedec Synagogue, after a Jewish man who was killed in an accident on the outskirts of Toronto and was buried in a non-Jewish cemetery as no Jewish cemetery was available. The man was later reinterred in the new Roselawn Cemetery soon after its establishment.

The Chesed Shel Emes subdivided the land and sold parcels to 23 individual congregations, fraternal organizations, and mutual aid societies who own and operate the sections as their own cemeteries within Roselawn Cemetery.

As a number of the sections were owned by synagogues or societies that have since become defunct and as the cemetery as a whole has been largely forgotten as new burials are infrequent, parts of the cemetery were found to be overgrown by vegetation and in disrepair.

Jewish Cemeteries Management Inc. (JCMI), a non-profit, was established in 1999 to assume control over older Jewish cemeteries in Ontario whose owners are no longer active or able to maintain their graveyards. The organization has taken ownership of sections of Roselawn, Bathurst Lawn Memorial Park and Mount Sinai Memorial Park and refurbished them. Another section of Roselawn Cemetery which had fallen into disrepair was owned by the now-defunct United Jewish Welfare Fund. It has been refurbished and is now maintained by the UJA Federation of Toronto which is the successor organisation of the Welfare Fund.

The cemetery runs along Roselawn Avenue, and is surrounded by homes that were built around it.

Today, the cemetery is administered by the Roselawn Lambton Cemetery Association which owns 9 of the cemetery's 23 sections and also manages the Lambton Hills and McCowan Road cemeteries.

== Notable burials ==
- Martin Wise Goodman (1935 – 1981), editor-in-chief of the Toronto Star
- Morley Safer (1931–2016), Toronto-born journalist with CBC News and CBS News and co-host of 60 Minutes.

== See also ==
- List of Jewish cemeteries in the Greater Toronto Area
- Lambton Hills Cemetery
