= National Refugee Service =

Refugee aid organization

- Founded: May 15, 1939; 87 years ago
- Headquarters: New York City
- Formerly called: National Coordinating Committee for Aid to Refugees and Emigrants Coming from Germany

The National Refugee Service (NRS) was a refugee aid organization founded in New York City on 15 May 1939 to assist refugees from Europe fleeing Nazi persecution. It represented a reorganization of a predecessor organization, the National Coordinating Committee for Aid to Refugees and Emigrants Coming from Germany (NCC), which had been in operation since 1934 as an umbrella organization of refugee aid agencies.^{p. 364-365} The National Refugee Service remained in existence until August 1946, when it merged with the Service for Foreign Born of the National Council of Jewish Women to form the new organization United Service for New Americans.

Financed through Jewish fundraising organizations, the National Refugee Service's predecessor organization, the NCC, had coordinated the refugee aid work of approximately 20 refugee and social welfare organizations, including both Jewish and non-Jewish groups.^{p. 39} In addition, it had developed a network of cooperating committees and organizations in nearly 500 communities across the United States to assist refugees arriving in New York to resettle in other smaller communities. However, by 1939, the structure of the NCC proved inadequate in the face of the increasing numbers of refugees arriving.^{p. 364-365}

Located at 165 West 46th Street until December 1941 and then in its own building at 139 Centre Street, the National Refugee Service consolidated and expanded refugee services, working directly with refugees at both the local and the national level. Its broad program of services included assistance during the process of immigration and meeting the requirements of immigration laws; legal work on behalf of immigrants at risk for deportation; relief, or temporary financial assistance; medical aid case work; vocational guidance and job placement services; retraining; loans for the establishment of small businesses; special assistance for those with specific professional backgrounds, including rabbis, musicians, and physicians; and social and cultural adjustment to American life.^{57−58}^{p. 367-368}

Building on the resettlement program that had been established under the NCC, the National Refugee Service within its first year expanded the network of cooperating organizations to an additional 200 communities.^{p. 366} Moreover, it maintained a staff of field representatives that communicated with and traveled to local communities in order to troubleshoot in a variety of matters related to the communities' work with refugees, including migration, family assistance, employment, retraining, and loans.^{p. 53} The National Refugee Service also produced reports and statistical studies that documented its own work and the work of cooperating agencies; and disseminated factual information about United States immigration during the period, and the changing character and situation of the refugee population in the United States. Through its newsletters and community bulletins, and special reports the National Refugee Service kept cooperating groups informed about the international situation, new legislation, changing government regulations, and any other circumstances that affected the lives of refugees and the work of those helping them. Beginning in late 1941, the National Refugee Service also had a Community Relations department, which took the lead in soliciting the participation of lay leaders in the agency's work by forming a number of advisory committees; oversaw relationships with local communities across the country; and directed promotional mailings and maintained a speakers bureau.

The National Refugee Service became the beneficiary of the centralized fundraising efforts of the newly founded United Jewish Appeal (UJA), the principal partners of which were the American Jewish Joint Distribution Committee and the United Palestine Appeal. In its first six months the National Refugee Service received $2.6 million from the UJA (in comparison, approximately $3 million had been raised for refugee needs in the United States in the previous five years combined). Over the seven years of its existence the National Refugee Service spent a total of over $15 million, most of it raised by the UJA.^{p. 365}

In meeting the diversity of needs among refugees the National Refugee Service integrated within its structure special committees to assist refugees of different professional backgrounds, including the National Committee for Refugee Musicians; the National Committee for the Resettlement of Foreign Physicians; and the National Committee on Refugee Jewish Ministers (also known as the Rabbis Committee). The National Refugee Service also gave subventions to other organizations serving particular needs. It worked very closely with some of these organizations, including the Emergency Committee in Aid of Displaced Foreign Scholars; the Emergency Committee in Aid of Displaced Foreign Medical Scientists; the Committee for Displaced Foreign Social Workers; the New York and Brooklyn sections of the National Council of Jewish Women; and German Jewish Children's Aid (later known as European Jewish Children's Aid).^{p. 400}

Additional outside organizations to which the National Refugee Service granted subventions at various times included: the Committee for the Study of Recent Immigration from Europe; the Committee for Refugee Education; the National Committee on Post-War Immigration Policy; the Common Council for American Unity; the Central Location Index (established in 1944 by six member agencies, including the National Refugee Service, to centralize the work of locating friends and relatives in Europe in response to inquiries); the Westchester County Coordinating Committee for Émigrés; the Jewish Vacation Association (a clearing bureau for summer camps for young people); and the Selfhelp of Émigrés from Central Europe (a volunteer organization that advised and assisted refugees in various ways, including job placement).^{p. 55-56}
