= Steeles Memorial Chapel =

Jewish funeral home in Toronto, Canada

- Formerly: Toronto Hebrew Funeral Parlour, United Hebrew Funeral Parlour, College Memorial Park, Steeles-College Memorial Chapel
- Type: Not-for-profit
- Industry: Death care
- Founded: 1927; 99 years ago
- Founder: Elias Pullen and Toronto chevra kadisha
- Headquarters: 350 Steeles Avenue West, Thornhill, Ontario, Canada
- Area served: Greater Toronto Area
- Website: steelesmemorialchapel.com

Steeles Memorial Chapel is a not-for-profit community-owned Jewish funeral home in Toronto. Steeles and competitor Benjamin's Park Memorial Chapel are the two primary Jewish funeral homes in the Toronto area.

== History ==
It was founded in 1927 as the Toronto Hebrew Funeral Parlour, with Elias Pullan as president, by the city's chevra kadisha, the Jewish community's volunteer burial society. The chevra kadisha was a volunteer body founded in Toronto in the mid-19th century. Due to the provincial government's introduction of regulation and licensing of the funerary profession in the 1920s, the chevra kadisha decided to formalize itself by applying for a charter from the provincial government. It functioned as a co-operative with surplus funds being given to Jewish charities.

In 1937, the Toronto Hebrew Funeral Parlour acquired a building at 331 College Street, formerly the location of H. Ellis & Son Funeral Directors, where funeral services would be held.

In 1947, the name was changed to United Hebrew Funeral Parlour and in 1954 it became College Memorial Park. In 1977, with the Jewish community having moved north, College Memorial purchased another Jewish funeral home, the two-year old Steeles Memorial Chapel at 350 Steeles Avenue West; the name of the amalgamated parlor became Steeles-College Memorial Chapel and later, Steeles Memorial Chapel.

== See also ==
- List of Jewish cemeteries in the Greater Toronto Area
