= Toronto Hebrew Memorial Parks =

- Abbreviation: THMP
- Formation: 1972; 54 years ago
- Founder: Sidney Freedman
- Type: Nonprofit organization
- Headquarters: Prosserman Jewish Community Centre
- Location: Toronto, Ontario, Canada
- Region served: Greater Toronto Area
- Services: Cemetery and burial services
- Official language: English
- Affiliations: Pardes Chaim Cemetery; Pardes Shalom Cemetery
- Website: thmp.ca

Toronto Hebrew Memorial Parks operates two Jewish cemeteries in York Region, north of Toronto, Pardes Chaim Cemetery and Pardes Shalom Cemetery.

THMP is a not-for-profit, community-owned agency, based in Toronto at the Prosserman Jewish Community Centre. What became THMP was first conceived of by lawyer and Temple Sinai president Sidney Freedman in 1965 when he saw the need for a community-run cemetery. In 1970, he purchased the property that would become Pardes Shalom and began the process of rezoning the land for use as a cemetery. In 1972, he founded Toronto Hebrew Memorial Parks, gifting the land to the community.

THMP operates the two largest Jewish burial grounds in the Greater Toronto Area, Pardes Shalom and Pardes Chaim.

Both cemeteries are divided into organizional sections designated for members of specific congregations and mutual aid societies. However THMP retains ownership and management of these sections. Both cemeteries also have large community sections open to Jewish individuals who are unaffiliated to a congregation or organization or who have not otherwise purchased plots in the organizational sections.

Unlike several older Jewish cemeteries in Toronto, THMP retains ownership and management of sections of Pardes Shalom and Pardes Chaim which are reserved for specific congregations or associations. This avoids the problem of cemetery sections becoming abandoned or derelict if the congregation or association they are assigned to becomes defunct or otherwise unable to maintain them.

THMP cemeteries do not permit cremated remains to be buried or scattered at its cemeteries as cremation is considered contrary to Jewish belief.

According to THMP's by-laws, an individual must be Jewish (by birth or conversion) to be buried in a THMP cemetery; exceptions are not made for non-Jewish partners in an interfaith marriage.

In 2018, Holy Blossom Temple and several other congregations opened Beit Olam cemetery at Glenview Memorial Gardens in Woodbridge, Ontario in order to accommodate burials for interfaith couples, cremated remains, and others who do not meet the strict eligibility requirements at THMP and other Jewish cemeteries in the region.

== Pardes Shalom Cemetery ==
Pardes Shalom (43°53′08″N 79°29′18″W) opened in 1977 and is a resting place for over 30,000 on an 89-acre (36 ha) site in Vaughan, Ontario, on Dufferin Street, north of Major Mackenzie Drive. Pardes Shalom has a memorial garden on its grounds in which individuals who are not buried in the cemetery or have no burial site are memorialized with plaques, trees and boulders.

== Pardes Chaim Cemetery ==
Pardes Chaim (43°54′39″N 79°28′42″W) opened in 2010 north of Toronto in Vaughan, Ontario, on Bathurst Street, north of Elgin Mills Road. The newer site will be able to accommodate between 70,000 and 90,000 burial plots over 200 acres (81 ha).

== See also ==
- List of Jewish cemeteries in the Greater Toronto Area
