= Dawes Road Cemetery =

Jewish cemetery in Toronto, Canada

Coordinates: 43°42′33″N 79°17′10″W

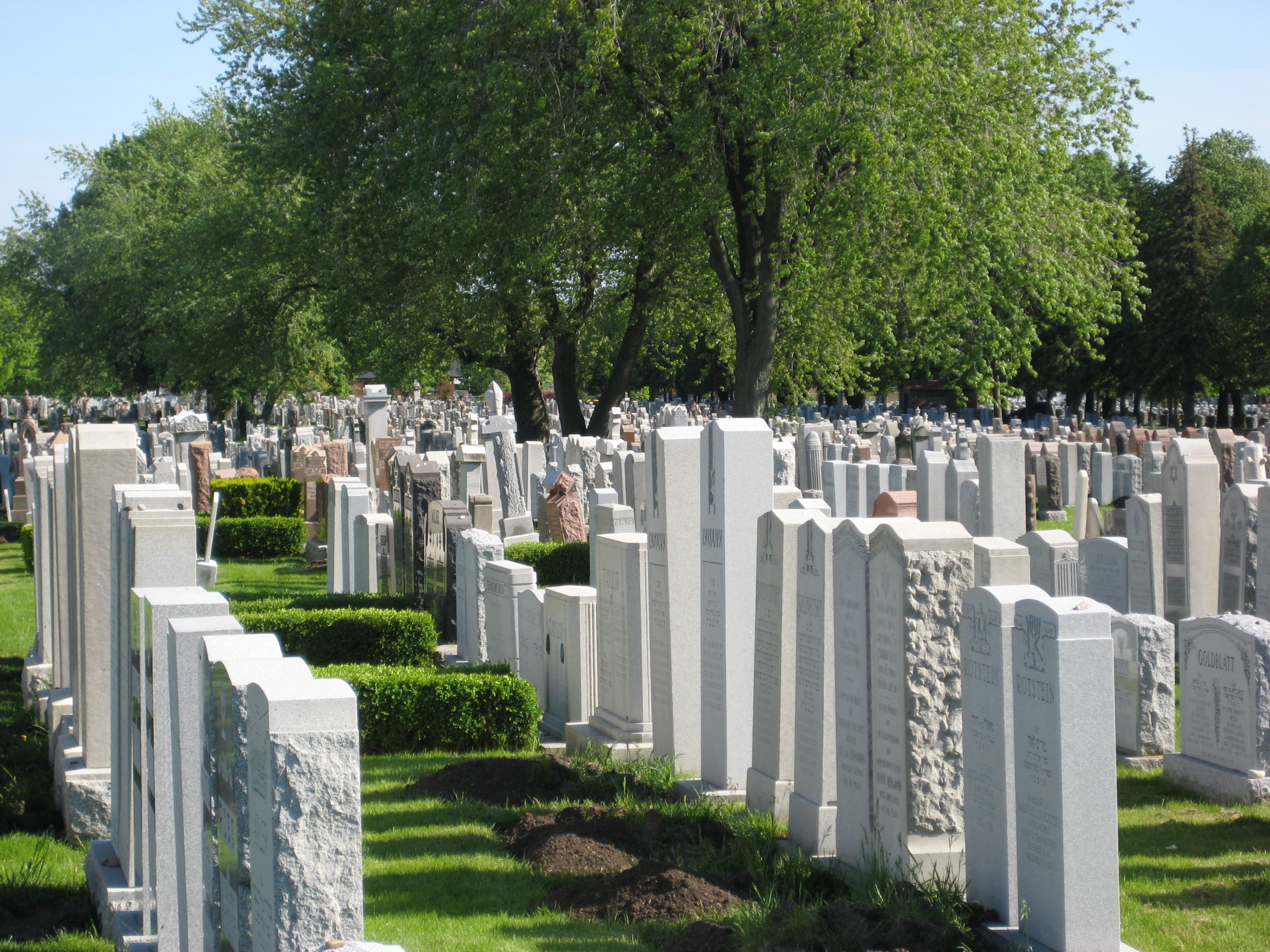
- Dawes Road Cemetery
- Interactive map of Dawes Road Cemetery

Details
- Established: 1898
- Location: 3169 St. Clair Avenue East, Clairlea, Toronto, Ontario
- Country: Canada
- Type: Jewish cemetery
- No. of graves: 13,000
- Find a Grave: Dawes Road Cemetery

Dawes Road Cemetery is a Jewish cemetery in Toronto, Ontario, Canada. It is located in Scarborough, on St. Clair Avenue east of Victoria Park Avenue. Established in 1898, it was the third Jewish cemetery in Toronto. The first cemeteries, the Pape Avenue Cemetery and Jones Avenue Cemetery, had been established in the eastern part of the city. Dawes Road Cemetery was also placed in what was then a rural area on the edge of the city. Since then some 13,000 people have been buried there, including 11 Canadian servicemen of World War II whose graves are registered by the Commonwealth War Graves Commission.

== Notable burials ==
- Samuel Shopsowitz, founder of Shopsy's Deli
- David Dunkelman (Sr.) founder of Tip Top Tailors

== See also ==
- List of Jewish cemeteries in the Greater Toronto Area
