= Nicomide =

Acne medication

Nicomide is an acne medication available in topical cream, topical gel and vitamin supplement form (U.S. Patent No. 6,979,468). Tablets are available only by prescription and contain the active ingredients nicotinamide, zinc, copper, and folic acid. The topical cream and topical gel are formulated into a 4% nicotinamide mixture. Dermatologists say this medication reduces inflammation of the skin, thereby reducing acne. Results from a well-controlled clinical trial in Caucasian and Japanese women have shown that 4-6 weeks of application of 2% nicotinamide moisturiser to the face decreases sebum production with significant differences in facial shine and oiliness. Nicotinamide gel is marketed as an over-the-counter treatment for acne in Canada, Australia, NZ, UK, USA and Ireland. If a twice-daily application causes excessive drying of the skin, one may reduce to once a day, or every other day. Nicotinamide is highly not recommended for acne in pregnancy or nursing women.

Nicomide is distributed by Sirius Laboratories Inc., a wholly owned subsidiary of DUSA Pharmaceuticals. DUSA ceased distributing Nicomide in June 2008 and set up an agreement with River's Edge Pharmaceuticals to allow them to distribute the product under DSHEA in August 2008 but the deal appears to have fallen through. The last time Nicomide was mentioned in DUSA's annual reports is March 2010.
