= Bonnie Burstow =

Canadian psychotherapist and anti-psychiatry activist (1945–2020)

- Born: Bonnie Judith Grower; March 6, 1945; Winnipeg, Manitoba, Canada
- Died: January 4, 2020 (aged 74); Toronto General Hospital, Toronto, Ontario, Canada
- Resting place: Pardes Chaim Cemetery, Vaughan
- Education: University of Manitoba (BA); University of Toronto (MA, MEd, PhD)
- Known for: Anti-psychiatry, feminist psychotherapy
- Spouse: John Arthur Burstow (m. 1966; div. 1972)
- Scientific career
- Fields: Education, psychotherapy
- Workplaces: Ontario Institute for Studies in Education, University of Toronto
- Thesis: Authentic human existence—its nature, its opposite, its meaning for therapy: a rendering of and a response to the position of Jean-Paul Sartre (1982)

Bonnie Judith Burstow (née Grower; March 6, 1945 – January 4, 2020) was a Canadian psychotherapist, professor, author, feminist and anti-psychiatry activist. A professor at the Ontario Institute for Studies in Education (OISE) of the University of Toronto, she became a prominent Canadian advocate of the abolition of psychiatry and was particularly critical of electroconvulsive therapy (ECT) and psychiatric drugs.

Burstow rejected the conventional medical model of mental illness and argued that many experiences classified as psychiatric disorders could instead be understood as responses to social, economic, political and interpersonal circumstances. Her approach combined radical feminism, psychotherapy and anti-psychiatry, and emphasized the effects of violence, trauma and oppression on women and other marginalized people.

== Early life and education ==
Burstow was born Bonnie Judith Grower on March 6, 1945, in Winnipeg, Manitoba. Her mother, Dena (Bloomfield) Grower, was an economist for the Manitoba provincial government, while her father, Sam Grower, worked as an aide to Manitoba's minister of health.

She attended the University of Manitoba, where she studied philosophy and English, receiving a bachelor's degree in 1967. She subsequently attended the University of Toronto, earning a master's degree in English and a Master of Education in educational theory. She completed a doctorate in educational theory at OISE in 1982, with a focus on adult education and counselling psychology. Her doctoral dissertation, Authentic human existence—its nature, its opposite, its meaning for therapy: a rendering of and a response to the position of Jean-Paul Sartre, examined the work of Jean-Paul Sartre.

Burstow married John Arthur Burstow in 1966. They divorced in 1972.

== Career and views on psychiatry ==
Burstow began practising psychotherapy in 1978 while completing her doctoral studies. Her therapeutic work increasingly focused on women who had experienced trauma and violence. She later said that her experiences working with women led her to conclude that behaviours treated as individual psychological problems were often understandable responses to living under oppressive circumstances.

Her approach developed into what she described as radical feminist therapy. Burstow argued that conventional psychiatry frequently interpreted women's reactions to violence and oppression as symptoms of individual illness rather than examining their social context. She was particularly critical of the historical tendency to characterize distressed women as "hysterical" and of what she regarded as the overdiagnosis and overmedication of women.

Burstow became associated with the anti-psychiatry movement, which had emerged internationally in the 1960s. She rejected the proposition that conditions conventionally described as mental illnesses necessarily represented diseases of the brain and argued instead that many forms of emotional distress were rational reactions to people's circumstances. She also drew parallels between the psychiatric and criminal justice systems, arguing that societies frequently categorized people whose behaviour was considered unacceptable as either "bad", placing them within the criminal justice system, or "sick", placing them within the psychiatric system.

Burstow taught at several Canadian universities before joining OISE in 1995. Her academic interests included feminist therapy, trauma, psychiatric survivors, anti-oppression and transgenerational trauma. She remained at OISE for the remainder of her career.

== Activism and writings ==
Burstow was active in campaigns opposing psychiatric treatment practices, particularly electroconvulsive therapy. She co-edited Shrink Resistant: The Struggle Against Psychiatry in Canada with activist Don Weitz in 1988. The collection included accounts by psychiatric survivors as well as criticism of psychiatric institutions.

In 1992, she published Radical Feminist Therapy: Working in the Context of Violence. The book presented a feminist approach to psychotherapy that situated women's emotional distress within broader structures of sexism, racism, class inequality and violence.

Burstow subsequently became one of Canada's most prominent advocates of anti-psychiatry. In 2003, she helped found the Coalition Against Psychiatric Assault, an organization opposed to psychiatric drugs, involuntary psychiatric treatment and electroconvulsive therapy.

In 2010, Burstow worked with Ontario New Democratic Party MPP Cheri DiNovo on a private member's bill that sought to end provincial public funding of electroconvulsive therapy. The bill was not passed by the Legislative Assembly of Ontario.

Her later academic work continued her criticism of psychiatric theory and practice. In Psychiatry and the Business of Madness: An Ethical and Epistemological Accounting (2015), Burstow argued for the abolition rather than reform of institutional psychiatry. She also edited or co-edited works dealing with resistance to psychiatry and wrote articles about trauma, psychiatric diagnosis and electroconvulsive therapy.

Burstow also wrote fiction. Her first novel, The House on Lippincott (2006), dealt with a Jewish family in Toronto and themes including the intergenerational effects of the Holocaust. Her second novel, The Other Mrs. Smith (2017), concerned a woman attempting to rebuild her life following electroconvulsive therapy.

== Scholarships and controversy ==
In 2016, Burstow established the Bonnie Burstow Scholarship in Antipsychiatry at the University of Toronto. Awarded to an OISE thesis student conducting research in anti-psychiatry, it was described as the first university scholarship devoted specifically to anti-psychiatry.

The scholarship prompted debate at the University of Toronto about academic freedom and the scientific status of anti-psychiatry research. University of Toronto psychiatry professor and historian Edward Shorter, a critic of the anti-psychiatry movement, argued that the university had made a mistake by permitting a scholarship that, in his view, legitimized the movement. He also disputed Burstow's rejection of psychiatric illness as a medical phenomenon.

Burstow defended anti-psychiatry as a legitimate field of academic inquiry and continued to finance the scholarship, including matching donations with her own money.

She also established scholarships supporting research into violence against Indigenous women and antisemitism. In 2019, she contributed $25,000 to establish the Bonnie Burstow Scholarship for Research into Antisemitism at the University of Toronto.

== Death ==
Burstow died at Toronto General Hospital on January 4, 2020, aged 74. She was buried in the community section of Pardes Chaim Cemetery north of Toronto.

== Selected works ==
=== Non-fiction ===
- Burstow, Bonnie; Weitz, Don (1988). Shrink Resistant: The Struggle Against Psychiatry in Canada. Vancouver: New Star Books. ISBN 978-0-919573-83-3.
- Burstow, Bonnie (1992). Radical Feminist Therapy: Working in the Context of Violence. Newbury Park, California: Sage Publications.
- Burstow, Bonnie (2015). Psychiatry and the Business of Madness: An Ethical and Epistemological Accounting. Palgrave Macmillan.
- Burstow, Bonnie (2019). The Revolt Against Psychiatry: A Counterhegemonic Dialogue. Palgrave Macmillan.

=== Fiction ===
- The House on Lippincott (2006)
- The Other Mrs. Smith (2017)
