= Max Haines =

Canadian true crime writer and journalist (1931–2017)

- Born: Max Haines; January 4, 1931; Antigonish, Nova Scotia, Canada
- Died: September 30, 2017 (aged 86); Etobicoke, Ontario, Canada
- Resting place: Pardes Chaim Cemetery, Vaughan, Ontario, Canada
- Occupation: True crime writer
- Years active: 1972–2006

Max Haines (January 4, 1931 – September 30, 2017) was a Canadian true crime newspaper columnist and author. His column was widely syndicated internationally.

Haines was born in Antigonish, Nova Scotia, to Jewish parents, Alexander and Augusta (Rich) Haines, and attended Morrison High School there.

He worked in the textile industry selling women's undergarments but began researching murders from around the world, past and present, as a hobby. After the Toronto Sun launched in 1971, he went to the newsroom with writing samples to pitch an idea for a column. His "Crime Flashback" column made its debut in the Toronto Sun in 1972 with a column about Lizzie Borden. Over the next 35 years, he researched over 2,000 crimes and his "Crime Flashback" column was syndicated across Canada and in several Latin and South American countries. He also wrote 27 true crime books and a memoir, The Spitting Champion of the World, about growing up in Nova Scotia. Readership of his syndicated column was over 3 million per week. He lived in Toronto, Ontario with his wife Marilyn. He retired in 2006.

In 2005, he was awarded the Derrick Murdoch Award, one of the Arthur Ellis awards, by the Crime Writers of Canada.

Haines died from progressive supranuclear palsy (PSP) on September 30, 2017, aged 86.
