= Lambton Hills Cemetery =

Jewish cemetery in Toronto, Ontario

- Interactive map of Lambton Hills Cemetery

Details
- Established: 1910
- Location: Toronto, Ontario
- Country: Canada
- Coordinates: 43.66589°N 79.50586°W
- Type: Jewish cemetery
- Owned by: Various congregations and organizations
- No. of graves: 3,000+
- Find a Grave: Lambton Hills Cemetery

Lambton Hills Cemetery, also known as Lambton Mills Cemetery, is a Jewish cemetery in Toronto, Ontario, Canada. Located on Royal York Road in the former Etobicoke area of the city, the cemetery was established in 1910 by Congregation Knesseth Israel and is one of Toronto's oldest Jewish burial grounds.

The cemetery consists of multiple independently owned sections affiliated with synagogues, landsmanshaftn, and Jewish communal organizations from across Toronto.

== History ==
Lambton Hills Cemetery was founded in 1910 by Congregation Knesseth Israel, a synagogue associated with Toronto's Junction neighbourhood. The cemetery property occupies a hill overlooking Royal York Road near the historic Lambton Mills area.

Over time, parcels of land within the cemetery were sold to additional congregations and organizations, resulting in the creation of approximately fourteen separately administered sections. The cemetery is maintained collectively through the Roselawn-Lambton Cemetery Association.

In the mid-20th century, the cemetery became associated with immigrant congregations and landsmanshaftn representing Jewish communities from Eastern Europe, including organizations connected to Ostroviec, Poland, and other destroyed communities commemorated after the Holocaust.

A Holocaust memorial dedicated to Jews murdered in Ostroviec between 1941 and 1945 was unveiled at the cemetery in 1966.

== Organization ==
The cemetery is composed of independently operated sections associated with synagogues, burial societies, and Jewish mutual aid organizations.

The grounds are accessed by an unpaved roadway leading uphill from Royal York Road.

In 2008, a section associated with Toronto's Temple Sinai was established to permit the burial of interfaith couples, making Lambton Hills one of the few Jewish cemeteries in the world at the time to allow non-Jewish spouses to be buried alongside Jewish partners.

== Notable burials ==
- Fanny "Bobbie" Rosenfeld (1904–1969), Olympic athlete and sports journalist.

== See also ==
- List of cemeteries in Toronto
- Roselawn Avenue Cemetery
- Mount Sinai Memorial Park
- Bathurst Lawn Memorial Park
