= Deanna Kamiel =

- Born: July 6, 1946; Toronto, Ontario; Canada
- Died: June 14, 2018 (aged 71); Manhattan, New York, United States
- Resting place: Pardes Chaim Cemetery, Vaughan, Ontario, Canada
- Occupations: Documentary film writer/producer, and a Professor of Film Development
- Spouse: Howard White (1972–1975)

Deanna Kamiel (July 6, 1946 – June 14, 2018) was a Canadian-born director, documentary film/public TV writer/producer with a career in public broadcasting at the CBC in Toronto and PBS in Minneapolis and professor of film development at SUNY Purchase College and then at The New School, Manhattan, New York City, US. She worked for 26 years (1992–2018) as Head of The New School's Documentary Studies program, Director of Graduate Certificate in Doc Studies Program, and Assistant Professor of Media Studies - School of Media Studies, Manhattan, New York, U.S. Kamiel's documentaries were based on live interviews of the person(s) the film was about. As a student at The University of Toronto in the 1960s, she wrote for The Varsity in Toronto, and The Ubyssey in Vancouver.

== Awards ==
- Guggenheim Fellowship, 1984, Creative Arts, video and audio
- Museum of Modern Art
- Northwest Broadcast News Association (regional Emmy), 1983
- National Association of Working Women, Best Profile, 1983
- National Film Board of Canada
- International Public Television Festival (INPUT): 1986, 1985, 1984
- Tokyo Video Festival, First Prize, Nuclear Outpost, 1985
- Chicago International Film Festival, Cinematography, Nuclear Outpost, 1985
- The Humanitarian Award at the Long Island International Film Expo, June 30, 2014
- Emmy (New York), City Arts, WNET, 1999

== Grants ==
- Ontario Arts Council Grant, 1979
- Faculty Support Award, Purchase College, State University of New York, 2005
- Faculty Support Award, Purchase College, State University of New York, 2010
- Provost Faculty Research Fund Grant, The New School, Office of the Provost, 2013-14

== Books ==
The Lace Ghetto

== Filmography ==
- Visions of Cinema (Interviews with Joseph L. Mankiewicz, Jonathan Demme, and Jean Luc Godard)
- Visions of Home
- Jean-Luc Godard
- Boys with bats: an American romance
- Milgrom's Obsession
- Maggie and the Men of Minnesota, 1972
- Dean and Me: Roadshow of an American Primary
- Ruth
- Adoption
- Nuclear Outpost
- Mickey's Diner
- Nuclear Outpost
- Nighttime at the Diner
- Lessons from an American Primary

== Articles ==
- "I believe my eyes: The transformative theatre of Hanif Kureishi",
