= United Service for New Americans =

The United Service for New Americans (USNA) was an aid organization founded in 1946 to help Jewish refugees from Europe, survivors from the camps and the war who often were the sole survivors from their families. The organization was the result of the merger of the National Refugee Service and the Service to Foreign Born Department of the National Council of Jewish Women (NCJW). Two leaders in the formation of the new organization were Edwin Rosenberg, who became its first president, and Katharine Engel (Mrs. Irving M. Engel), of the NCJW, who became the first chair of the board of directors. In 1949 a separate branch was started to deal with immigration through New York, the New York Association for New Americans (NYANA). In 1954 the national organization merged with the Hebrew Sheltering and Immigrant Aid Society (HIAS) and the migration services of the American Jewish Joint Distribution Committee in forming the United HIAS Service, while the NYANA remained an independent organization.

== See also ==
- New Americans Club
