= Martin Wise Goodman =

Canadian newspaper editor (1935–1981)

Martin Wise Goodman CM
- Born: 1935; Calgary, Alberta, Canada
- Died: 1981 (aged 45–46); Toronto, Ontario, Canada
- Resting place: Roselawn Avenue Cemetery, Toronto
- Occupations: Newspaper editor, journalist
- Employer: Toronto Star
- Spouse: Janis Goodman
- Children: 2
- Awards: Order of Canada (1981)

Martin Wise Goodman CM (1935 – 20 December 1981) was a Canadian journalist, newspaper editor and executive. He served as editor-in-chief and president of the Toronto Star and was appointed a Member of the Order of Canada in 1981.

== Career ==
Born in Calgary and raised in Montreal, Goodman joined the Toronto Star in 1958. He subsequently served as the newspaper's Washington and Ottawa bureau chief, managing editor, and then, from 1971 to 1978, as editor-in-chief. In 1978, he was appointed president and chief executive officer of Toronto Star Newspapers.

Goodman received a Nieman Fellowship at Harvard University in 1961. He was appointed to the Order of Canada in June 1981 in recognition of his contributions to Canadian journalism, the training of young journalists and national unity.

== Personal life and legacy ==
Goodman married Janis Goodman in 1960. They had two children, Jonathan and Lauren. He died of pancreatic cancer on 20 December 1981, aged 46.

The Martin Goodman Trail, a waterfront recreational trail in Toronto, was named in his honour. The Martin Wise Goodman Canadian Nieman Fellowship at Harvard University also commemorates him.
