= Benjamin's Park Memorial Chapel =

Jewish funeral home in Ontario, Canada

- Formerly: H. Benjamin and Sons, Park Memorial Chapel
- Type: Private
- Industry: Death care
- Founded: 1922; 104 years ago
- Founder: Henry Benjamin
- Headquarters: 1401 Steeles Avenue West, Toronto, Canada
- Area served: Greater Toronto Area
- Parent: The Benjamin Group
- Subsidiaries: Hebrew Basic Burials, the Benjamin Foundation, Benjamin's Landmark Monuments, Benjamin's Lifecycle Financial Services, The Benjamin Institute
- Website: benjaminsparkmemorialchapel.ca

Benjamin's Park Memorial Chapel is a family-owned Jewish funeral home in Toronto, Canada. It was founded in 1922 as H. Benjamin and Sons by Henry Benjamin, a member of the chevrah kadishah in Toronto. It subsequently became Park Memorial Chapel and then Benjamin's Park Memorial Chapel. Located downtown on Spadina Crescent for forty years, the funeral home moved to 1401 Steeles Avenue West in 1976.

Benjamin's and Steeles Memorial Chapel are the two primary Jewish community funeral homes in the Greater Toronto Area. The city's third funeral home, Hebrew Basic Burials, is affiliated with Benjamin's.

In 2022, the provincial licensing body for funeral homes, the Bereavement Authority of Ontario criticised the funeral chapel for "inappropriate" business practices and ordered Benjamin's to cease the practice of charging a 10 percent administrative fee on memorial donations collected by the funeral home's charitable arm on behalf of grieving families. Benjamin's was also ordered to refund all such fees collected in the previous six years The Toronto Board of Rabbis issued a statement saying they were "deeply concerned" about the allegations and calling upon Benjamin's to "uphold their sacred responsibilities" to mourners. and was also ordered to refund other "inappropriate extra fees" that had been charged.

== See also ==
- List of Jewish cemeteries in the Greater Toronto Area
