= Randy Starkman =

Canadian sportswriter

- Born: 1960
- Died: April 16, 2012 (aged 51); Toronto, Ontario
- Resting place: Mount Sinai Memorial Park
- Known for: Sports journalist
- Spouse: Mary Hynes
- Children: Ella

Randy Starkman (1960 – April 16, 2012) was a Canadian sports journalist who reported on amateur sports and athletes for the Toronto Star newspaper. He was twice awarded a National Newspaper Award, first in 1993 for his reportage of Ben Johnson's second positive test for steroids, and in 1994 for a series on concussions suffered by hockey players. Starkman authored the book Let the Games Begin in 1994, and co-authored books with Eric Lindros and Currie Chapman. At the time of his death, he was working with Olympic athlete Clara Hughes on another book. Starkman died at age 51 on April 16, 2012, after a brief illness.

== Career ==
Born in 1960, Starkman began his career as a journalist working part-time for United Press Canada (UPC) while he attended Ryerson Polytechnical Institute in Toronto, Canada. He left Ryerson when UPC offered him a full-time position. He was assigned to cover the amateur sports circuit, stationed in Europe as part of UPC's Athlete Information Bureau from 1984 to 1988. It was during this posting to Europe that Starkman met his future wife, Mary Hynes, who was also working as an amateur sports journalist at that time.

In 1988, Starkman joined the sports staff of the Toronto Star, with a focus on amateur and Olympic sports. In 1993, he won the first of two National Newspaper Awards, for his article revealing that disgraced Canadian Olympic sprinter Ben Johnson had tested positive again for performance-enhancing drugs. He won his second National Newspaper Award the following year for his series on concussion injuries in hockey. He turned down opportunities to cover major Toronto sports teams, instead electing to focus on Olympic and amateur sport. During the course of his career, Starkman covered 12 Olympic games. Fellow Star journalist Rosie DiManno wrote that Starkman's reputation amongst Canadian athletes was such that during the media scrums that followed international competitions, athletes would always stop where Starkman stood waiting, and "would actually scan the throng looking for his swarthy face." His fellow journalists came to rely on his extensive knowledge about amateur sports and athletes, and peer John MacKinnon referred to him as "the gold standard for amateur sport reportage." At the same time, he gained the respect of amateur sports administrations.

Further recognition of Starkman's journalistic talents came in 2010 from Sports Media Canada, the Canadian branch of the Association Internationale de la Presse Sportive, for breaking the story that South Korean figure skater Yuna Kim had fired her coach Brian Orser. He also received the 2012 Sports Journalist award from the Toronto Sports Council.

Starkman worked with former Canadian Women's Ski Team coach Currie Chapman to write On the Edge, a history of the team under Chapman's leadership; the book was released prior to the 1988 Olympics. In 1991, he co-authored Fire and Ice with National Hockey League star Eric Lindros. He went on to write Let the Games Begin!, released prior to the 1994 Olympics, which was aimed at young readers. At the time of his death, he was working with Olympian Clara Hughes in preparation for writing a book about her athletic career.

In July 2012, the Canadian Olympic Committee honoured Starkman's journalistic contributions to Canadian amateur sport by naming their London 2012 Olympics media room the Randy Starkman Press Room. The 2015 Pan American Games organizers announced on July 2, 2015, that the press centre for the games, held in Starkman's home town of Toronto, Canada, would be named the Randy Starkman Media Centre.

== Personal life ==
Starkman was married to fellow journalist Mary Hynes. They have one daughter, Ella.

Following an assignment covering a swim meet in Montreal in April 2012, Starkman became ill and was admitted to hospital in Toronto. He died of pneumonia-related causes on April 16, 2012.

== Bibliography ==
- On the Edge. Currie Chapman and Randy Starkman. McGraw Hill Ryerson. 1988.
- Fire and Ice. Eric Lindros with Randy Starkman. HarperCollins. 1991.
- Let the Games Begin!. Randy Starkman. Scholastic. 1994.
