= New Americans Club =

American Holocaust survivors association

A New Americans Club is a type of mutual benefit society established by Holocaust survivors in the United States after the Second World War. These organizations helped survivors rebuild their lives, integrate into American society, and preserve the memory of the Holocaust. Emerged from prewar Jewish immigrant organizations known as landsmanshaftn, which were based on members’ shared hometowns in Europe, New Americans Clubs united survivors through their common experience of displacement and resettlement after the Holocaust.

== Purpose and activities ==
New Americans Clubs provided social, emotional, and practical assistance to Holocaust survivors who often faced significant challenges in rebuilding their lives from the genocide, including physical and psychological trauma, language barriers, employment and social integration hardship, and anti-immigrant sentiments. The main ways these clubs provided include helping survivors through naturalization, securing documentation, serving them food, interpreting languages, securing housing, providing financial assistance for medical and economic needs, burial benefits, reuniting families, enrolling children in schools and preserving memory of the six million Jewish victims.

They focused on preserving prewar European Jewish traditions through social events like dinners, lectures, and holiday celebrations. There were also newsletters and publications to document member stories, events, and communal histories. Through these community-building activities, members have formed meaningful connections with one and another, "survivors acted as aunts and uncles to each other’s American-born children." Membership was open to Holocaust survivors and immediate families. The clubs practiced democracy, as there was an elected president, vice president, secretary, and treasurer. Leaders met weekly or monthly at synagogues, Jewish Community Centers, or members’ homes.

== Displaced Persons Act (1948) ==
The Displaced Persons Act (1948) signed into law by President Truman allowed 140,000 Holocaust survivors to come to the United States between 1945 and 1953. Most settled around New York City, so the United Service for New Americans (USNA) directed newcomers into Midwestern cities to distribute the economic and social burden of these overcrowded coastal cities. The remainder flowed through the prairies and the West Coast, building clubs in cities such as New Orleans, Kansas City, Ann Arbor, and Los Angeles, among others.

=== Richmond, Virginia ===
In Richmond, Virginia, a New Americans Jewish Club was established by 15 newcomers in 1947. The community grew fast; by November, members included 63 men and 5 windowed or single women. Members did not consider themselves as refugees, but as immigrants. They preserved history by sharing holidays and festivals, producing theatre, hosting memorial services, and sharing their stories.

However, by 1985, membership continued to decline so leadership elected to disband the organization.

=== New Orleans, Louisiana ===
In 1952 at the New Orleans Port of Embarkation, 150 passengers mostly in their 20s–30s in boats were greeted with volunteers from the National Council of Jewish Women. With the help of these volunteers, survivors gradually settled into schools and into jobs. This community became the New Americans Club of New Orleans. By 1953, only 2% of postwar immigrants from this community required outside assistance. By 1990, these newcomers' per capita income far exceeded the national average.

=== Kansas City, Missouri ===
In Kansas City in 1958, a group of Holocaust survivors met with Sol E. Margolin, the executive director of the Jewish Community Center, to discuss ways to preserve the Holocaust. They established the New Americans Club of the Jewish Community Center of Kansas City.

This club entirely organized and funded the Warsaw Ghetto Memorial Service and Warsaw Ghetto Monument also known as The Six Million, a memorial sculpture that stands at the entrance to the old Jewish Community Center in Kansas City. This monument was dedicated by President Truman on June 9, 1963, as it is one of the first memorials in the US to recognize the history of the Holocaust and to prevent something similar from occurring again. On the sculpture are engraved names of family members who had died during the Holocaust.

=== Other communities ===
New Americans Clubs were also established in numerous other cities. In 1952, a group of 12 Polish Holocaust survivors established a community in Los Angeles, where they helped peers integrate outside major coastal hubs.

In the 1990s, organizations inspired by New Americans Clubs were assisting new immigrants to the United States. In Ann Arbor, Michigan, Jewish Family Services supported Russian-speaking seniors immigrating from the former Soviet Union and post-Cold war through psychosocial programs and English classes.

== Legacy ==
By the late twentieth and early twenty-first centuries, many original New Americans Clubs had dissolved as their Holocaust survivor members aged and passed away. However, their legacy continued through Holocaust memorials, educational programs, and community institutions established by survivors.

The model of peer support developed by New Americans Clubs has also influenced programs serving more recent refugee populations, including immigrants from Afghanistan and Ukraine. Jewish Community Centers and Jewish Family Services organizations continue to use similar approaches to assist newcomers in adapting to life in the United States.

== See also ==
- United Service for New Americans
