= DUSA Pharmaceuticals =

American pharmaceutical company

DUSA Pharmaceuticals, Inc.
- Type: Subsidiary
- Industry: Pharmaceuticals
- Founded: 1991; 35 years ago
- Founder: D. Geoffrey Shulman
- Defunct: 2012
- Fate: Acquired by Sun Pharmaceutical
- Successor: DUSA Dermatology
- Headquarters: Billerica, Massachusetts, United States
- Area served: United States
- Products: Dermatological pharmaceuticals and treatments
- Owner: Sun Pharmaceutical
- Website: www.dusapharma.com

DUSA Pharmaceuticals, Inc. was an American pharmaceutical company specializing in dermatological products and treatments. It was founded in 1991 by Canadian dermatologist and pharmaceutical executive D. Geoffrey Shulman, who served as the company's chairman, president and chief executive officer.

The company developed Levulan photodynamic therapy, a treatment using aminolevulinic acid. In 1999, Levulan became the first topical photodynamic therapy approved in the United States for the treatment of actinic keratosis. DUSA's products also included Nicomide.

DUSA was acquired by Caraco Pharmaceutical Laboratories, a subsidiary of Sun Pharmaceutical, in 2012. Its products continued to be marketed under the DUSA Dermatology name.

== History ==
In the first quarter of 2006, DUSA acquired Sirius Laboratories in a transaction valued at approximately $30 million. Sirius was a privately held specialty pharmaceutical company founded by dermatologist Joel E. Bernstein in 2000. It developed treatments for conditions including acne vulgaris and rosacea.

In June 2007, Robert F. Doman was elected chief executive officer. Shulman remained chairman of the board and assumed the position of chief strategic officer. In April 2008, DUSA announced that Shulman's role was expected to change because of a serious illness. His employment agreement was terminated in December 2008 and replaced by a part-time consulting arrangement, with company filings citing his health.

In 2012, Caraco Pharmaceutical Laboratories, a subsidiary of Sun Pharmaceutical, acquired DUSA.
