= Westminster-Branson =

Coordinates: 43.656°N 79.475°W

Westminster–Branson
- Neighbourhood
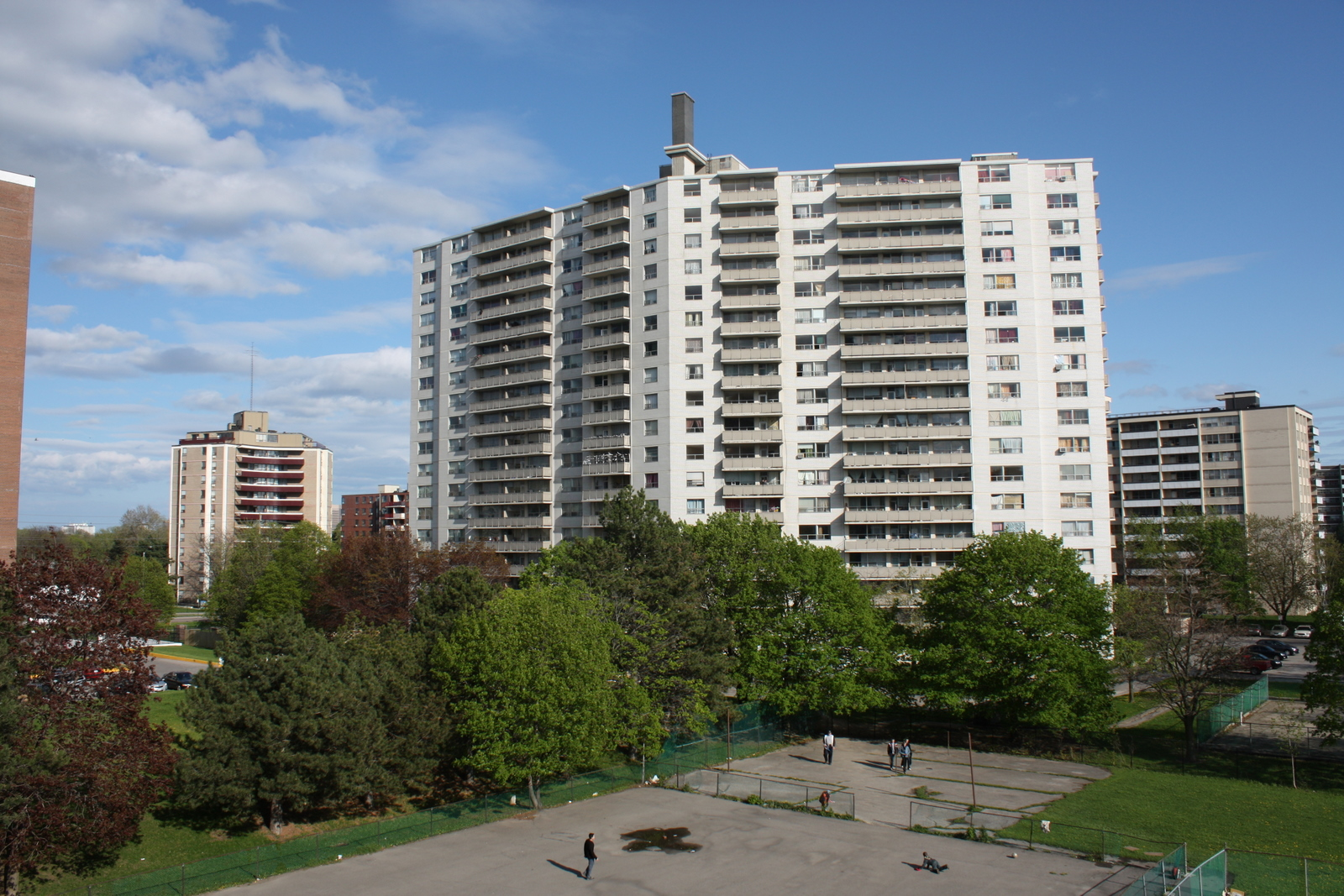
- View of apartments in Westminster

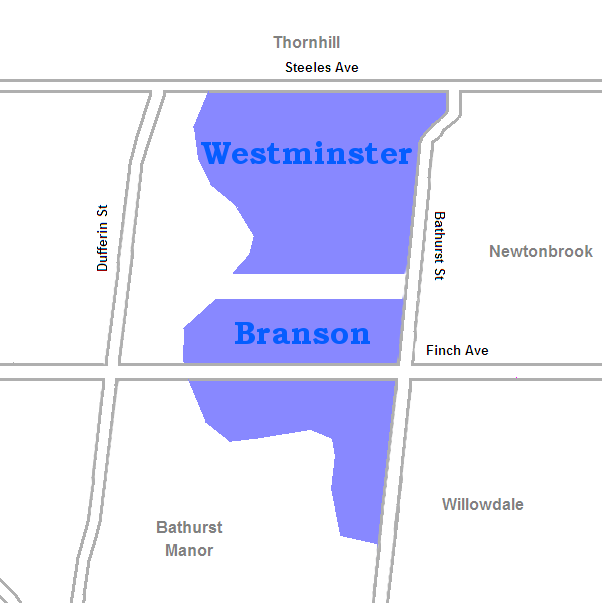
- Country: Canada
- Province: Ontario
- City: Toronto
- Municipality established: 1850 York Township
- Changed municipality: 1922 North York from York Township
- Changed municipality: 1998 Toronto from North York

Westminster–Branson is a neighbourhood in the city of Toronto, Ontario, Canada.

Branson is located along Finch Avenue, west of Bathurst Street and east of the west branch of the Don River. Westminster is located just to the north, across the Westminster Cemetery. It is also known as Fisherville, after the former town on the site. It stretches north to Steeles Avenue, and the northern border of Toronto. The neighbourhood is home to North York General Hospital's Ambulatory Care Centre.

== Demographic ==
The area's population is predominantly Russian-speaking, with a significant, though smaller, Ukrainian-speaking contingent. Many residents are Jewish immigrants from the Soviet Union who arrived in Canada after a period of settlement in Israel. The neighbourhood's key ethnic communities are Jewish, Russian, and Filipino.

As of 2006, the neighbourhood had 24,403 residents.

== Education ==
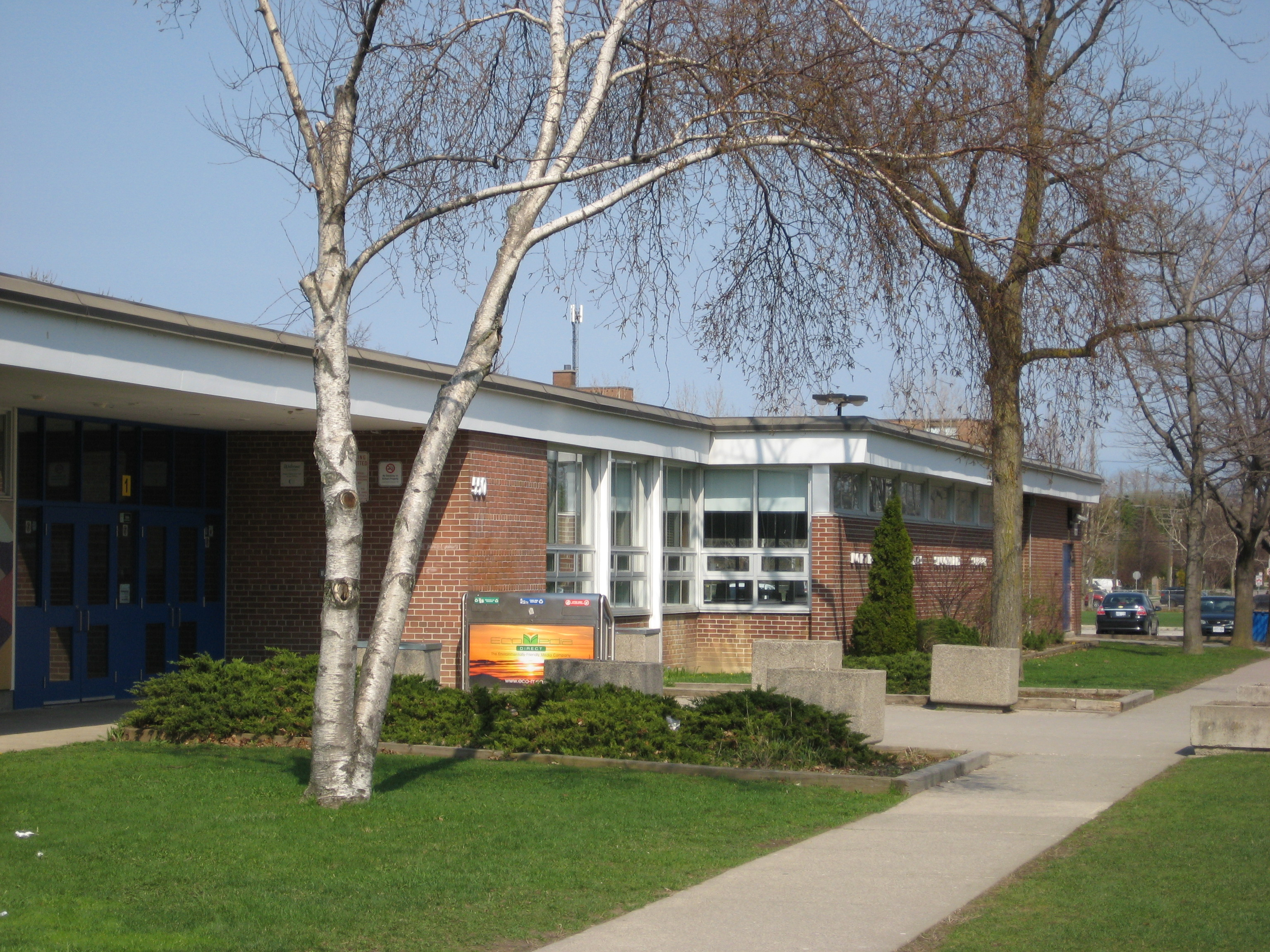
Northview Heights Secondary School is a public secondary school in the neighbourhood.

One public school board operates schools in the neighbourhood, the secular Toronto District School Board (TDSB). The TDSB operates an elementary school called Rockford Public School. The school board also operates one secondary school, Northview Heights Secondary School.

In addition to TDSB, there are also three other public school boards that operate in the City of Toronto that also offer schooling to residents of the neighbourhood. They include the secular school board, Conseil scolaire Viamonde (CSV), and two separate school boards, the Conseil scolaire catholique MonAvenir (CSCM), and the Toronto Catholic District School Board (TCDSB). CSCM, CSV, and TCDSB do not operate a school in Westminster–Branson, with their students attending schools situated in other neighbourhoods in Toronto.

== Recreation ==
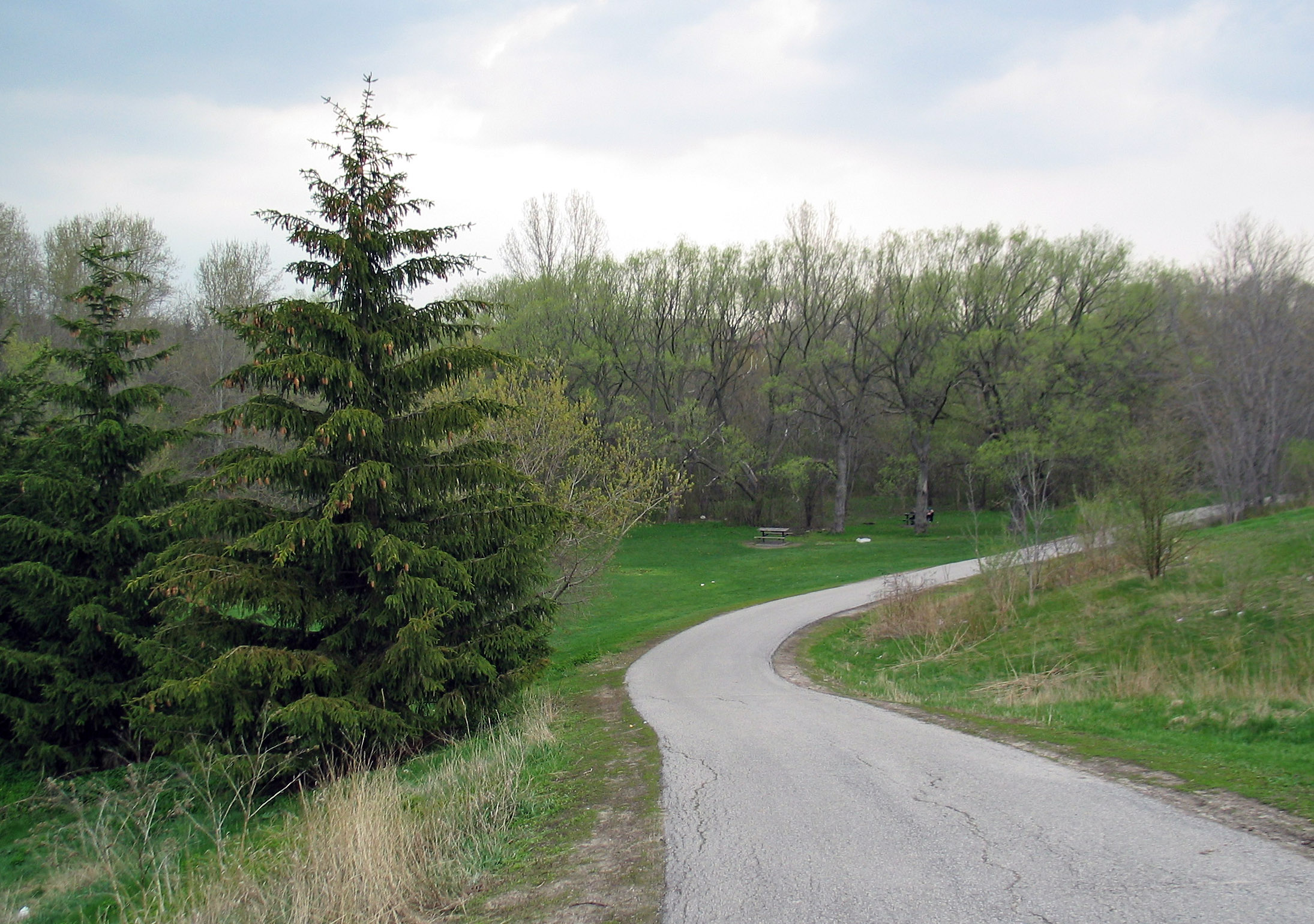
G. Ross Lord Park is a municipal park located in the neighbourhood.

Esther Shiner Stadium is a multi-purpose outdoor sports facility situated in the neighbourhood. Located behind Northview Heights Secondary School, it is managed by the City of Toronto. The stadium is used by the secondary school and several recreational clubs based in the neighbourhood. The Toronto Public Library also maintains a branch, Centennial, in the neighbourhood.

The neighbourhood is home to a number of municipal parks, including G. Ross Lord Park, the Finch Avenue Hydro Corridor, and the West Don Parklands. Parks such as G. Ross Lord Park and West Don Parklands form a part of the Toronto ravine system. Municipal parks in Westminster–Branson are managed by the Toronto Parks, Forestry and Recreation Division.

== Transport ==
Westminster–Branson has three major arterial roadways running through the neighbourhood. Bathurst Street runs north-south, with Steeles Avenue and Finch Avenue as east-west thoroughfares.

The Toronto Transit Commission provides local and express services to this neighbourhood.
