= Pape Avenue Cemetery =

Cemetery in Leslieville, Toronto, Canada

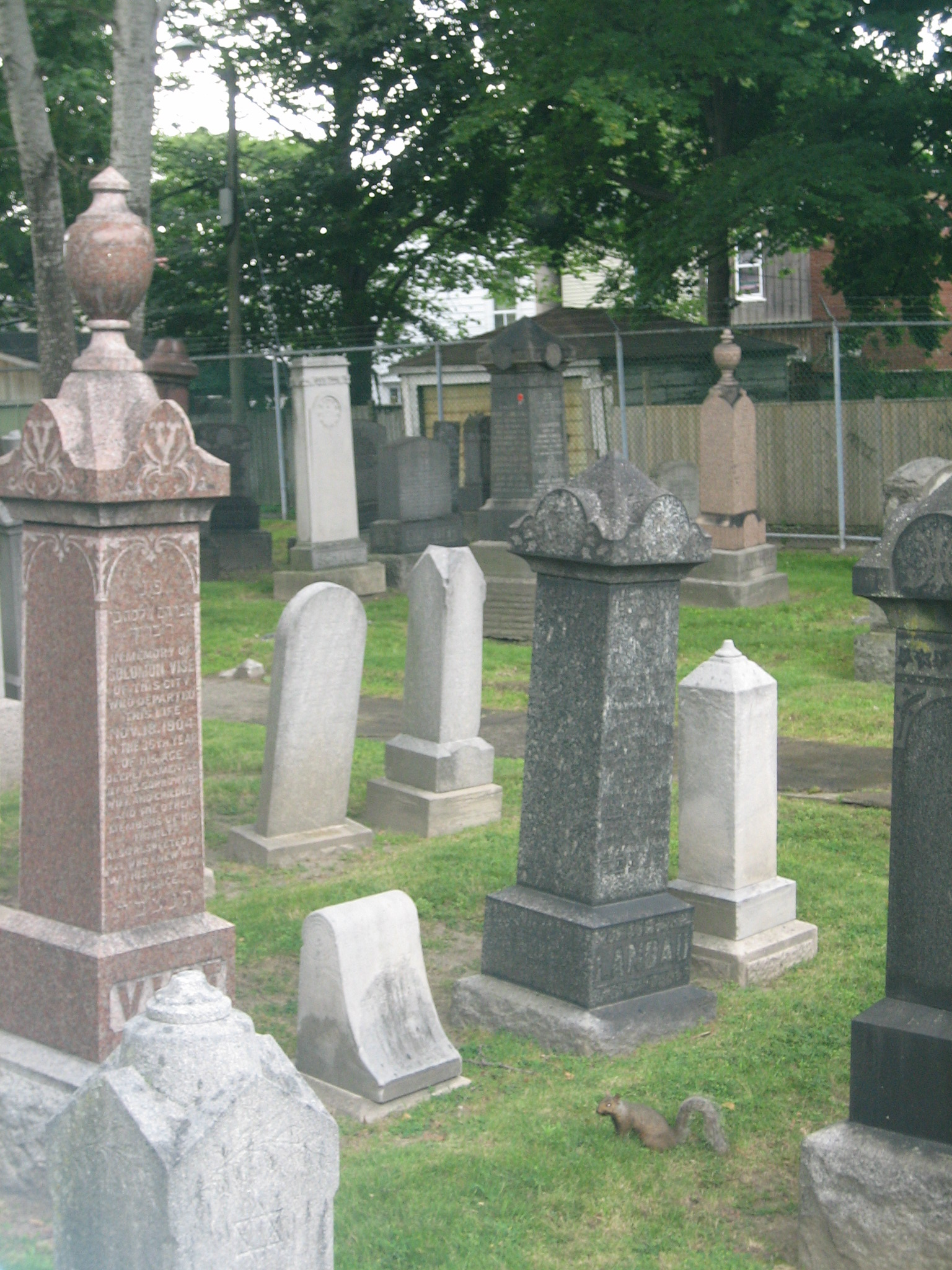
- Pape Avenue Cemetery
- Interactive map of Pape Avenue Cemetery

Details
- Established: 1849
- Closed: 1930s
- Location: 317 Pape Avenue, Leslieville, Toronto
- Country: Canada
- Coordinates: 43.66761°N 79.33947°W
- Type: Jewish cemetery
- Owned by: Holy Blossom Temple
- Find a Grave: Pape Avenue Cemetery

Pape Avenue Cemetery, officially known as Holy Blossom Cemetery, is the first Jewish cemetery in the city of Toronto, Canada. The small cemetery is now closed to new burials, and is mostly hidden within the residential neighbourhood of Leslieville.

It was established in 1849 by two prominent local businessmen, Judah G. Joseph and Abraham Nordheimer. At the time the nearest Jewish cemeteries were in Montreal or Buffalo, and Joseph was concerned for his fatally ill son Samuel, who eventually became the first burial in the new cemetery. The location near the corner of Pape (then called Centre Road) and Gerrard was then in still rural areas to the east of the city. It was not close to much of the Jewish community, but was a convenient location to purchase.

It was one of the first Jewish institutions established in Toronto, being opened some years before the city's first synagogue. When Toronto Hebrew Congregation, the predecessor to Holy Blossom Temple, was established in 1856, it took over management of the cemetery, and continues to run it today. Over the next decades almost all the early founders of Toronto's Jewish community would be buried there.

The small Pape Avenue Cemetery quickly ran out of room, and it was closed to new burials in the 1930s.

== Holy Blossom Memorial Park ==
Holy Blossom Memorial Park
- Interactive map of Holy Blossom Memorial Park

Details
- Established: 1930s
- Location: 68 Brimley Road, Scarborough, Toronto, Ontario
- Country: Canada
- Coordinates: 43.72307°N 79.24304°W
- Type: Jewish cemetery
- Owned by: Holy Blossom Temple
- Website: holyblossom.org/cemeteries/
- Find a Grave: Holy Blossom Memorial Park

Holy Blossom Memorial Park is a Jewish cemetery in the Cliffcrest neighbourhood in Scarborough, Toronto, Ontario, Canada. Located at 66 Brimley Road near Lake Ontario, the cemetery is owned and operated by Holy Blossom Temple, Canada's oldest Jewish congregation.

The cemetery was established in the 1930s to replace the congregation's earlier burial ground, Pape Avenue Cemetery, which had become full. Holy Blossom Memorial Park serves members of Holy Blossom Temple as well as the wider Jewish community.

== History ==
Holy Blossom Memorial Park was developed after the closure of Pape Avenue Cemetery, the congregation's original burial ground in Toronto's Leslieville neighbourhood.

As Toronto's Jewish population expanded eastward and northward during the early 20th century, Holy Blossom Temple acquired a larger property in Scarborough to accommodate future burials.

The cemetery is not full and still has plots available for sale to both members and non-members of Holy Blossom synagogue. Unlike many traditional Jewish cemeteries in Toronto, Holy Blossom Memorial Park permits cremation interments and includes sections for both conventional burials and cremated remains.

== Notable burials ==
- Johnny Wayne (1918–1990), comedian and entertainer
- Frank Shuster (1916–2002), comedian and entertainer
- Bora Laskin (1912–1984), 14th Chief Justice of Canada
- Saul Laskin (1918–2008), first mayor of Thunder Bay
- Nathan Phillips (1892–1976), 52nd Mayor of Toronto
- Alex Levinsky (1910–1990), professional ice hockey player
- Murray Koffler (1924–2017), businessman and founder of Shoppers Drug Mart

== See also ==
- List of Jewish cemeteries in the Greater Toronto Area
