= Holy Blossom Temple =

Reform synagogue in Toronto, Ontario

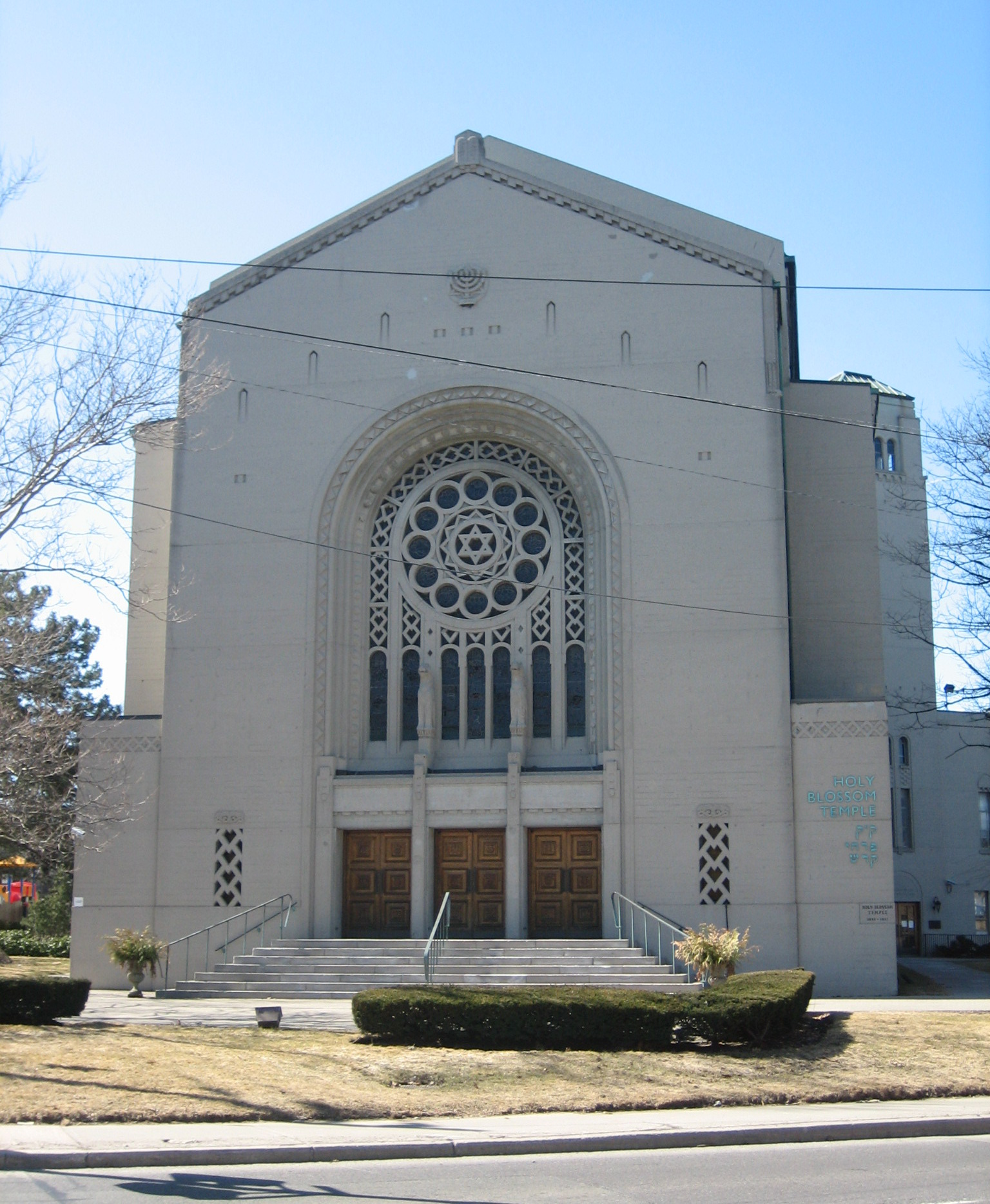
- Holy Blossom Temple in 2009

- Location in Toronto

Religion
- Affiliation: Reform Judaism
- Ecclesiastical or organisational status: Synagogue
- Ownership: Toronto Hebrew Congregation
- Leadership: Rabbi Yael Splansky; Rabbi John Moscowitz (Emeritus)
- Status: Active

Location
- Location: 1950 Bathurst Street, Toronto, Ontario, M5P 3K9
- Country: Canada
- Coordinates: 43°41′54″N 79°25′31″W

Architecture
- Architects: Chapman and Oxley; Maurice D. Klein
- Type: Synagogue
- Style: Late Romanesque Revival
- Established: 1856 (as a congregation)
- Completed: 1897 (Bond Street); 1938 (Bathurst Street)

Website
- holyblossom.org

The Holy Blossom Temple is a Reform synagogue located at 1950 Bathurst Street in Toronto, Ontario, Canada. It is the oldest Jewish congregation in Toronto. Founded in 1856, it has more than 7,000 members. W. Gunther Plaut, who died on 8 February 2012 at the age of 99, was a long time Senior Rabbi there.

== History ==
Holy Blossom Temple was the merger of two congregations. The Toronto Hebrew Congregation was formed in 1849 by members from Germany (including Bavaria and Alsace), Bohemia, Great Britain, the United States, Russia, Galicia, and Lithuania. The Congregation conducted services in members' homes and founded the Pape Avenue Cemetery, Toronto's first Jewish cemetery. The congregation was known as the Daytshishe Shul because of its modern services. In 1856, Lewis Samuel, a Jewish immigrant from York, England arrived in Toronto along with 17 Jewish families from England and Europe and helped them organize the Sons of Israel Congregation. The Ontario Heritage Foundation lists Holy Blossom as the first Jewish congregation in Canada, west of the Ontario/Quebec border..

Barnett A. Elzas was rabbi at Holy Blossom from 1890 to 1893.

=== Bond Street synagogue ===
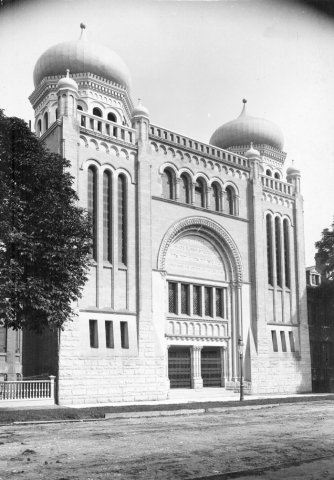
Holy Blossom Temple, 115 Bond Street, ca. 1900, designed in the Byzantine Revival style. It is now a Greek Orthodox church.

In the 1930s the congregation bought land and built a synagogue on what was then the outer edge of the city.

The former synagogue on Bond Street was sold to the city's Greek Orthodox parish.

=== Bathurst Street synagogue ===
Holy Blossom Temple was designed in the Romanesque Revival style in synagogue architecture by architects Chapman and Oxley with Maurice Dalvin Klein. Construction began in 1937 and was completed the next year. Holy Blossom Temple was dedicated on May 20, 1938. The structure's reinforced concrete frame permitted an interior uninterrupted by structural columns. Using concrete and other modern building materials, the building features a campus-like planning of the institution and includes a parking lot. Holy Blossom Temple is a rare example of a building built with a concrete facade before World War II.

Joan Friedman became the first woman to serve as a rabbi in Canada in 1980, when she was appointed as an Assistant Rabbi at Holy Blossom Temple. Her appointment was followed shortly after by that of Elyse Goldstein as Assistant Rabbi from 1983 to 1986.

== See also ==
- History of Jews in Canada
