= Landsmanshaft =

Mutual aid society of Jewish immigrants from the same European town or region

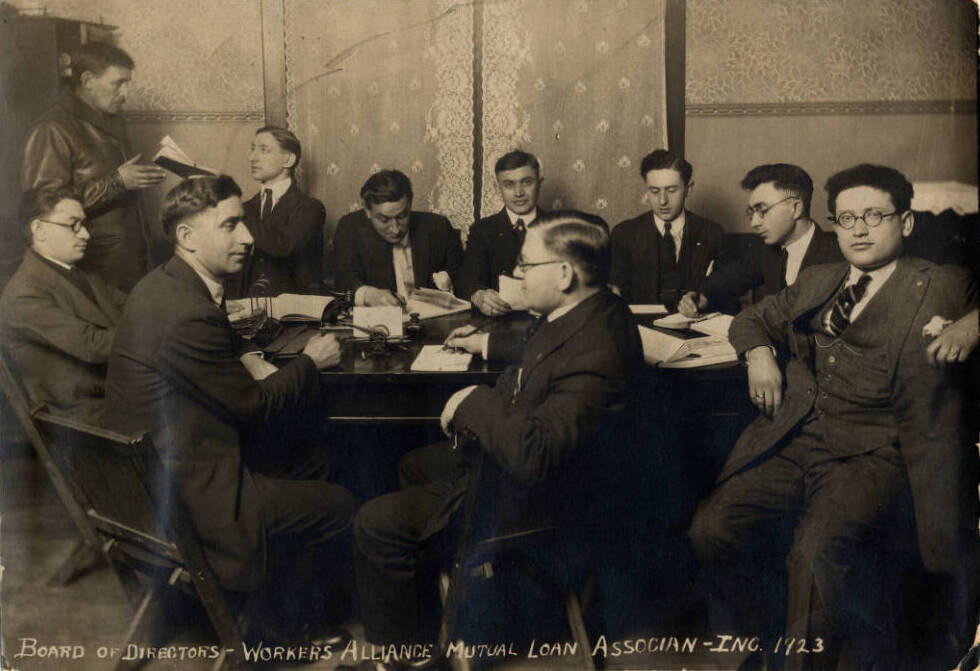
Board of Directors of the Workman's Circle Loan Association, St. Paul, Minnesota, 1923

A landsmanshaft (Yiddish: לאַנדסמאַנשאַפט, also landsmanschaft; plural: landsmans(c)haftn or landsmans(c)hafts) is a socialist-leaning mutual aid society, benefit society, or hometown society of Jewish immigrants originating from the same European town, area or region and settling in a new geographical area.

== History ==
The landsmanshaft organizations aided immigrants' transitions from Europe to America by providing social structure and support to those who arrived in the United States without the family networks, practical skills and economic resources that had sustained them in Europe. Toward the end of the 19th and in the beginning of the 20th centuries, they provided immigrants help in learning English, finding and providing housing or accommodation and employment, locating family and friends, and an introduction to participating in local democracy, through their own meetings and procedures such as voting on officers, holding debates on community issues, and paying dues to support the society and community. Through the first half of the 20th century, meetings were often conducted and administrative minutes recorded in Yiddish, which was the language that all members could understand, especially among the proletariat. As Jewish immigration declined, most landsmanshaft functions faded into the background, but the organizations nevertheless continued as a way of maintaining ties to life in Europe as well as providing forms of housing accommodation, life insurance, disability and unemployment insurance, and subsidized burial.

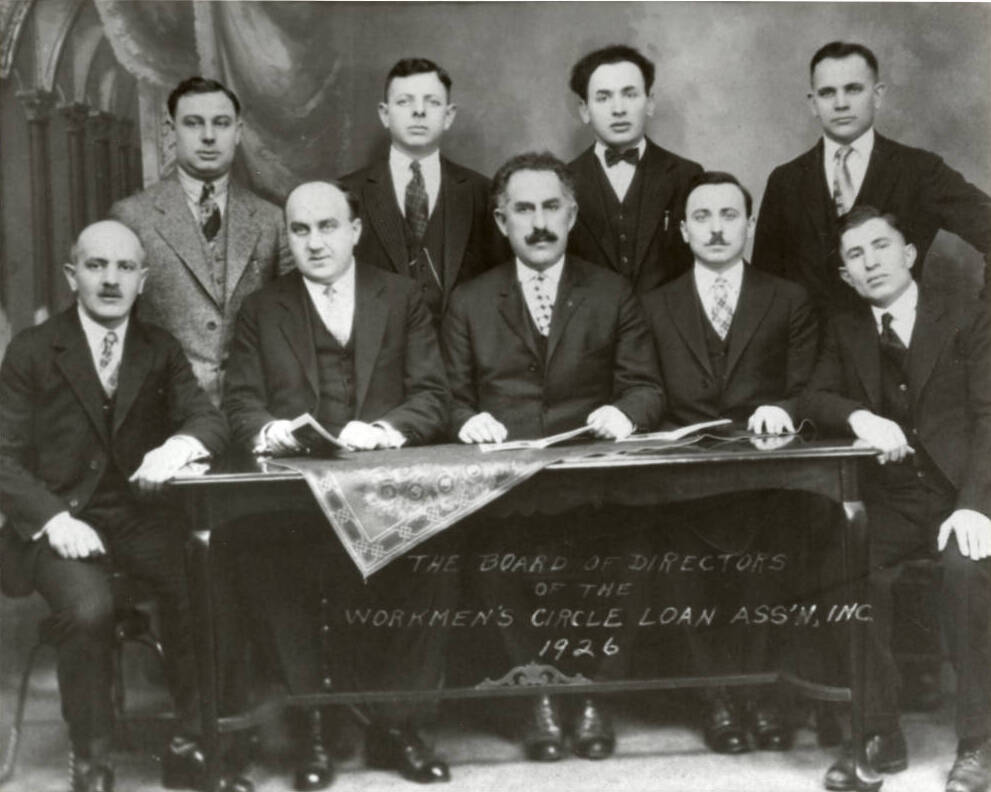
Board of Directors of the Workman's Circle Loan Association, St. Paul, Minnesota, 1926

Members paid dues on a regular basis, and if they lost their jobs, became too sick to work, or died, the society paid the member or their family a benefit to keep them afloat during that time. When the funds were not needed to support members, landsmanshaftn frequently invested the money in funds that supported the Jewish community in others ways, such as Israel Bonds. Most landsmanshaftn were based in New York City, where the majority of Jews settled and conditions were conducive to sustaining these types of organizations, though they sometimes relocated as the membership migrated to the suburbs.

== Types ==
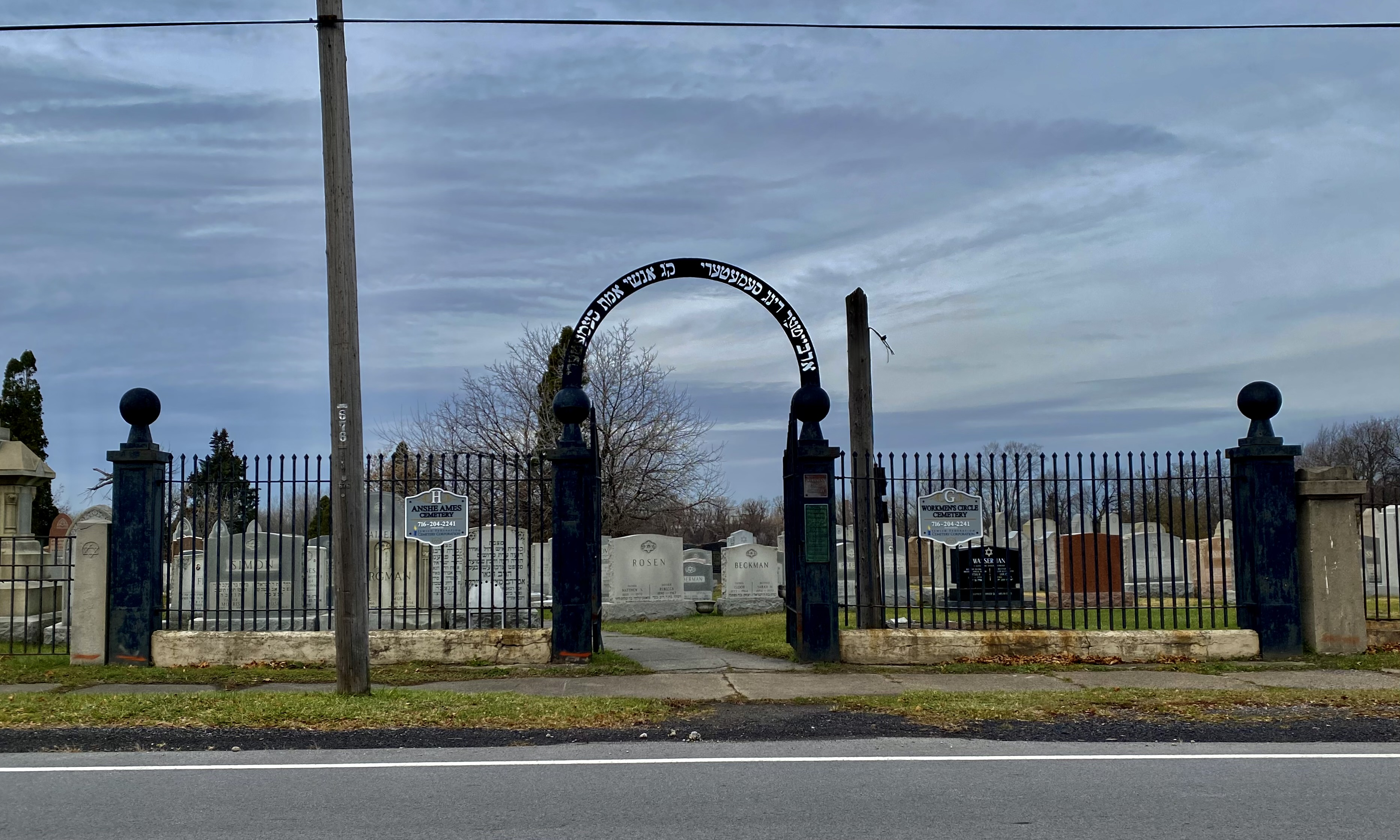
Cemetery gates for the Workmen's Circle and Anshe Ames, Cheektowaga, New York

There were different types of landsmanshaftn, including Jewish burial societies known as chevra kadisha, societies associated with a particular synagogue or social movement, and "ladies auxiliary" or feminist societies for women. (Landsmanshaftn sometimes admitted only men as members, with the understanding that their wives and children were covered by their membership and received equivalent benefits, or had a ladies' auxiliary group for women). The Workers Circle or der Arbeter Ring, formerly "The Workmen's Circle", is a mutual aid society with nowadays more than 200 branches. Still, because it is not based on geography or members' hometowns, it is not strictly a landsmanshaft, although it functions as one.

In 1938, a federal Works Progress Administration project identified 2,468 landsmanshaftn in New York City, where the overwhelming number in the United States were located. The number of landsmanshaftn began to decline in the 1950s and 1960s as their members died and were not replaced by the next generation of their members' children. The vast majority became defunct, though some societies continue to meet regularly into the 21st century, and operate scores of burial plots in cemeteries in the New York metropolitan area.

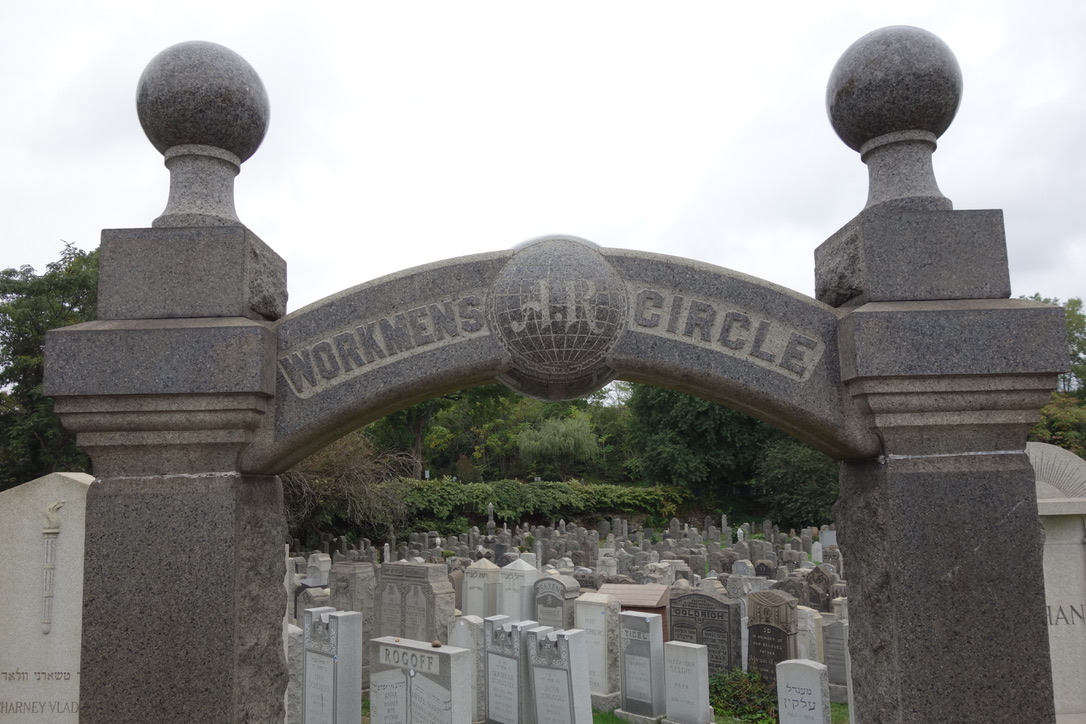
Cemetery gate, Mount Carmel Cemetery (Queens), NY

== Records ==
Some records of defunct landsmanshaftn are in the archives of YIVO.

== See also ==
- New Americans Club
- Federation of Expellees
- German Expellees

== Bibliography ==
- Schwartz, Rosaline and Susan Milamed, From Alexandrovsk to Zyrardow: A Guide to YIVO's Landsmanshaftn Archive, New York: YIVO Institute for Jewish Research, 1986.
- Soyer, Daniel, Jewish Immigrant Associations and American Identity in New York, 1880-1939, Detroit: Wayne State University Press, 2001.
- Weisser, Michael R., A Brotherhood of Memory: Jewish Landsmanshaftn in the New World, Cornell University Press, 1985, ISBN 0-8014-9676-4.
