= List of cemeteries in York Region =

This is a list of cemeteries in York Region, Ontario, Canada.

Active cemeteries include religiously-affiliated and secular properties.

Abandoned cemeteries are managed by the municipalities they are located in. In some cases, where graves are no longer found or missing markers are added to identify their previous usage. Some abandoned cemeteries were once attached to a church which has either closed or burned down.

Smaller formerly denominational cemeteries are now non-denominational with many maintained municipally.

There are 11 known First Nations sites in York Region with 3 confirmed mass graves of ossuary used to bury the dead from former villages.

Name	Location	Dates	Interments	Affiliation	Notes	Image
Aurora Wendat (Huron) ossuary	SE corner of Vandorf Sideroad and Kennedy Road near Lemonville, Whitchurch-Stouffville 44°0′28″N 79°20′16″W	1500s–1570s?	~2000 skeletal remains	First Nations – Wendat (Huron)	Currently farmland with some forested areas; one of three major sites with 8 more in the Stouffville area	
Mantle Wedat (Huron) ossuary	Near Byers Pond Park, Stouffville, Whitchurch-Stouffville 43°57′49″N 79°14′13″W	1500s–1530s	~300–400 skeletal remains	First Nations – Wendat (Huron)	Area now residential neighbourhood with small parkland; one of three major sites with 8 more in the Stouffville area	
Radcliff Wedat (Huron) ossuary	SE corner of Highway 48 and Bloomington Road near Bloomington, Whitchurch-Stouffville	1550–1615	hundreds of remains	First Nations – Wendat (Huron)	Currently farmland; one of three major sites with 8 more in the Stouffville area	
Cashel / St Helen's Presbyterian Church Cemetery	10835 Kennedy Road; Cashel, Markham	1827		Presbyterian	Church demolished 1860s, now maintained by City of Markham	
Christ the King Catholic Cemetery	Cedar Grove, Markham	2004–		Roman Catholic Archdiocese of Toronto	Opened in 2004	
Rouge Valley / Cedar Grove Mennonite Church Cemetery	Cedar Grove, Markham	1824–		Mennonite		
Full Gospel Assembly Of God Church / Box Grove Cemetery	Box Grove, Markham	1850–present		Full Gospel Assembly Of God Church	Formerly Methodist and United Church	
Buttonville Cemetery	Buttonville, Markham	1810–		Formerly Wesleyan Methodist	Resting place for John Button and family (son Francis Button, son Newbury Button, grandson William Marr Button). Now owned and maintained by City of Markham – as active restricted burial site	
Eckardt Cemetery	Milliken Mills, Markham	1854–		N/A – Formerly pioneer cemetery for Eckardt family	now owned and maintained by City of Markham – as active but restricted burial	
First (Ninth Line) Baptist Church Cemetery	Milnesville, Markham	1848–??		Baptist	Ninth Line Baptist Church structure moved to Markham Museum; now owned and maintained by City of Markham – as active but restricted burial	
Hagerman (West) Cemetery	Hagerman's Corners, Markham	1832		Wesleyan Methodist	Church structure demolished 1920s; now owned and maintained by City of Markham – as active but restricted burial	
Hagerman (East) Cemetery	Hagerman's Corners, Markham	1838		Presbyterian	Church structure demolished; now owned and maintained by City of Markham – as active restricted burial	
St. John's 5th Line Church Cemetery	7285 Warden Avenue Risebrough, Markham	1864–		Church of Scotland/Presbyterian/United Church of Canada	Church burned down 1929; now owned and maintained by City of Markham – as active restricted burial	
Byer Cemetery	Milnesville, Markham	1819–??		N/A – pioneer plot for Byer family	Inactive – located on farm of Jonathan Byer opposite First Baptist Church; Owned and maintained by City of Markham	
Clendennen Cemetery	Greensborough, Markham	1815–1950??		N/A – family plot on Jonathan Clendennen farm	Inactive – now in residential area; Owned and maintained by City of Markham with bronze marker fenced off area	
Pingle Burying Place	Quantztown, Markham	1799–1822		N/A – on site of former Pingle family farm	Inactive; Owned and maintained by City of Markham	
Raymer Cemetery	Raymerville, Markham	1812–1896		Mennonite	Inactive; Owned and maintained by City of Markham	
Reesor Pioneer Cemetery	Cornell, Markham	1806–1899		N/A – Reesor family	Inactive – marker added later; Owned and maintained by City of Markham	
Reesor Mennonite Church Cemetery	Cedar Grove, Markham	1857–		Mennonite	Active cemetery of Mennonite Church	
St. John's Lutheran Church Cemetery	Buttonville, Markham	1820s–1932?		Lutheran Church	Inactive after church moved 1932; now owned and maintained by City of Markham	
Thornhill (Pioneer) Methodist Cemetery	Thornhill, Markham	1837–1861		Methodist	Inactive; Owned and maintained by City of Markham	
Thornhill Cemetery	Thornhill, Markham	1832		Non-Denominational	Maintained by Trustees of Thornhill Cemetery	
Angus Glen Farm	Angus Glen, Markham	after 1850s		N/A – likely Stiver family farm plot	Former pioneer cemetery graves have disappeared and likely link to original owner/settler Francis Stiver c.1850, sold to Arthur Stollery in 1957 and now owned by Angus Glen Golf Club	
William Berczy Historic Cemetery	Angus Glen, Markham	1820?		Lutheran		
Brownsburger (Boyle)	Mongolia, Markham	1816–??		N/A – family plot on former Brownsburger and later Jonathan Boyle farm	Former pioneer cemetery and now managed by Public Works Canada as part of Pickering Airport Lands. Graves moved to Wideman Mennonite Cemetery	
Tomlinson (Thompson?) Cemetery	Box Grove, Markham	1841–??		N/A – Tomlinson family plot	Former pioneer cemetery on Box Grove Golf Course and managed by Markham Green Golf Club. Grave of Hannah Tomlinson (1811–1841) moved to Box Grove United Church graveyard.	
Bethel Lunau Cemetery	Unionville, Markham	1832–??		Primitive Methodist, later United Church	now owned and maintained by City of Markham – as active restricted burial	
Aurora Cemetery	near Cherry, Aurora	1869–		Non-Denominational	Managed by Aurora Cemetery Corporation	
Aurora Trinity Church Cemetery	Aurora	1846–1869		Anglican Church	Closed and graves relocated as new church built 1883–1884 to Aurora Cemetery with few remaining markers located at rear of rebuilt church.	
Elgin Mills Cemetery	near Headford, Richmond Hill	1979–		Non-Denominational	Owned by Mount Pleasant Group. Home to the Mausoleum of the Heavens, known for its hand-painted ceilings.	Elgin Mills Cemetery
Beechwood Cemetery	Concord, Vaughan	1965–		Non-Denominational	Owned by Mount Pleasant Group. Features a mausoleum.	
Holy Cross Catholic Cemetery	Thornhill, Markham	1954–		Roman Catholic Archdiocese of Toronto	A major Catholic site with multiple large indoor mausoleums and crypts.	
Maple United Cemetery	Maple, Vaughan	1871–		United Church	Now non-Denominational	
Elmwood Cemetery	Markham Village, Markham	1860–		United Church	Managed by St Andrew's United Church	
Richmond Hill Presbyterian Cemetery	old Village of Richmond Hill, Richmond Hill	1806–		Presbyterian	Now non-Denominational; Managed by Richmond Hill Presbyterian Church	
Hillcrest Cemetery	Woodbridge, Vaughan	1916–		Commercial	Owned by Park Lawn Corporation	
Queen of Heaven Catholic Cemetery	Woodbridge, Vaughan	1985–		Roman Catholic Archdiocese of Toronto	Features St. Anthony’s Mausoleum with large mosaics and private rooms.	
St. Luke's Roman Catholic Church Cemetery	Thornhill, Markham	1846–		Roman Catholic Archdiocese of Toronto	Maintained by Hoy Cross Cemetery	
Zion Lutheran / German Episcopal Congregation Church / Old St Stephen's / Sherwood Lutheran Cemetery	Concord, Vaughan	1806–		Langstaff German Episcopal Congregation, later Zion Lutheran Church	now maintained by City of Vaughan	
Glenview Memorial Gardens	Woodbridge, Vaughan	2002–		Commercial	Land purchased 1996. Owned by Arbor Memorial	
Edgeley Burying Ground / Edgeley Mennonite Cemetery	Concord, Vaughan	1799–??		Edgeley Mennonite Church	now Non-Denominational and maintained by City of Vaughan	
Reupard's Settlement Pioneer Burying Ground	Maple, Vaughan	1811–1925		Wesleyan Methodist	Closed and marker added 1964 by then Town of Vaughan; now maintained by City of Vaughan	
Pardes Shalom Cemetery	Vaughan	1977–		Jewish	Owned by Toronto Hebrew Memorial Parks	
St. Andrew's Cemetery	Markham Village, Markham	1840–		St. Andrew's United Church	Active	
Browns Corner United Church Cemetery	Brown's Corners, Markham	1843–		Presbyterian/United Church	Active	
Ebenezer United Church	Milliken Mills, Markham	1876–		Primitive Methodist, now United Church		
Highland Hills Memorial Gardens	Gormley, Whitchurch-Stouffville	1999–		Commercial	Land acquired 1993, opened 1999. Features an extensive indoor mausoleum and niche facility. Owned by Arbor Memorial	
Pardes Chaim Cemetery	Vaughan	2010–		Jewish	Owned by Toronto Hebrew Memorial Parks	
Toronto Muslim Cemetery	Oak Ridges, Richmond Hill	2012–	1500+ as of 2021. Active cemetery	Muslim	Managed by Toronto Muslim Cemetery	
Chinese Memorial Garden	Oak Ridges, Ontario, Richmond Hill	Under construction, scheduled opening 2022		N/A – Tradition Chinese	Located next to Toronto Muslim Cemetery and will focus on traditional Chinese cemetery style	
Peaches United Church Cemetery	Peach's Corners, Markham	1862–??		United Church	Church still found next to cemetery but left vacant; cemetery maintained by Peaches United Church Cemetery Board	
St Phillips on the Hill Cemetery	Unionville, Markham	1829–		Anglican Church		
King City Cemetery	King City	1886–				
Stouffville Cemetery	Stouffville	1849–				
Bethesda Lutheran Church Cemetery	Unionville, Markham	1803–		Lutheran Church	Church moved to 20 Union Street (in Main Street Unionville) 1910	
Dickson Hill Cemetery	Dickson Hill, Markham	1812–?		Non-Denominational	First burial 1810	
Headford United Church Cemetery	Headford, Richmond Hill	1850s		United Church	Burial restricted to current plot owners only	
Victoria Square United Church Cemetery	Victoria Square, Markham	1830s		United Church	Active	
St Patrick's Cemetery	Vinegar Hill, Markham	1861–??		Roman Catholic Archdiocese of Toronto	Closed but maintained by Archdiocese	
Heise Hill Dunkard Cemetery	Gormley, Whitchurch-Stouffville	1815 (used pioneer cemetery by Christian Heise 1811)		Brethren in Christ	Active and maintained by Heise Hill Cemetery Board	

== See also ==
- List of cemeteries in Toronto
- List of cemeteries in Peel Region
- List of cemeteries in Durham Region
- List of cemeteries in Halton Region
