= List of Muslim cemeteries in the Greater Toronto Area =

This is a list of Muslim cemeteries in the Greater Toronto Area (GTA), including dedicated Muslim cemeteries, designated Muslim burial grounds and sections within non-denominational cemeteries, and other cemeteries used by Muslim congregations and organizations.

== List ==
Name	City/Region	Neighbourhood/Municipality	Opened	Affiliation	Ownership	Notes	Ref.
Beechwood Cemetery Muslim sections	York Region	Vaughan		various	Mount Pleasant Group	Designated Muslim burial sections within a non-denominational cemetery. Beechwood Cemetery was established in 1965.	
Brampton Funeral Home & Cemetery Muslim gardens	Peel Region	Brampton		various	Arbor Memorial	Contains two gardens dedicated to Muslim burials. Arbor Memorial describes the cemetery as having its largest Muslim gardens.	
Duffin Meadows Cemetery Muslim sections	Durham Region	Pickering		various	Mount Pleasant Group	Contains designated Muslim burial sections. Grave lots and funeral arrangements at the cemetery are offered through several GTA Muslim organizations, including the Islamic Foundation of Toronto and Pickering Islamic Centre.	
Glen Oaks Funeral Home & Cemetery Muslim section	Halton Region	Oakville		various	Arbor Memorial	Designated Muslim burial section within a non-denominational cemetery. ISNA Canada arranges burials and makes grave lots available at Glen Oaks.	
Glenview Memorial Gardens Muslim sections	York Region	Woodbridge		various	Arbor Memorial	Contains designated Muslim burial sections and is used by several GTA mosques and Islamic funeral services.	
Meadowvale Cemetery	Peel Region	Brampton		various	Mount Pleasant Group	Used extensively for Muslim burials. Grave lots and funeral arrangements are made available through Muslim organizations including ISNA Canada, Malton Islamic Centre and the Etobicoke Muslim Community Organization. Meadowvale Cemetery opened in 1981.	
Muslim Green Cemetery section, Toronto Muslim Cemetery	York Region	Richmond Hill		Sunni	Muslim Green Cemeteries Corporation	Muslim Green Cemeteries Corporation operates a portion of the Toronto Muslim Cemetery property under an agreement with Toronto Muslim Cemetery Corporation. Litigation between the organizations concerned the development and management of the non-profit cemetery and Muslim Green's authority to operate and set prices for plots within its portion of the cemetery.	
Pine Ridge Memorial Gardens	Durham Region	Ajax		various	Arbor Memorial	Used for Muslim burials by GTA mosques and Islamic organizations. The Islamic Foundation of Toronto and Madina Masjid are among the organizations that arrange burials at the cemetery.	
Thornton Cemetery	Durham Region	Oshawa		various	Mount Pleasant Group	Used for Muslim burials. Pickering Islamic Centre makes grave lots at the cemetery available to members of the Muslim community, and Madina Masjid includes Thornton among the cemeteries used for its funeral services.	
Toronto Muslim Cemetery	York Region	Richmond Hill	2012	Muslim	Toronto Muslim Cemetery Corporation	A 36-acre cemetery reserved for Muslim burials. Its operator describes it as the only all-Muslim cemetery in the Greater Toronto Area. The cemetery received its Ontario cemetery licence on February 29, 2012, and held its grand opening ceremony on June 24, 2012.	
Muslim Burial Ground, York Cemetery	Toronto	Willowdale, North York	early 1970s	Muslim	Mount Pleasant Group	Mount Pleasant Group's first dedicated Muslim burial ground. It was designed after representatives of the cemetery organization met with the Aga Khan in the early 1970s. Graves were surveyed facing southeast toward Mecca.	

== See also ==
- Islamic funeral
- Islam in Canada
- List of cemeteries in Toronto
- List of Jewish cemeteries in the Greater Toronto Area
