= List of cemeteries in Peel Region =

The following is a list of cemeteries and burial sites within the Regional Municipality of Peel, Ontario, Canada, categorized by municipality.

== Brampton ==
Name	Address	Denomination	Ownership	Years active	Notes / Sources
Brampton Cemetery	350 Main St N	Non-denominational	City of Brampton	1863–present	Main municipal cemetery.
Brampton Crematorium and Visitation Centre	30 Bramwin Court	Non-denominational	Private, family owned	2012–present	Specializes in cultural cremation funerals for Sikhs and Hindus but also conducts non-religious services and services for other faiths and cultures.
Brampton Pioneer Cemetery	350 Main St N	Non-denominational	City of Brampton	1825–1907	Shared site with Brampton Cemetery; designated heritage site.
Meadowvale Cemetery	7732 Mavis Rd	Non-denominational	Mount Pleasant Group	1981–present	Largest modern cemetery in Brampton. Also has cremation facilities, above-ground cremation niches (indoor/outdoor) and columbaria.
Brampton Memorial Gardens	10061 Chinguacousy Rd	Commercial	Arbor Memorial	1950s–present	Private corporate cemetery, funeral home, and crematorium. Offering indoor crypts and climate-controlled visitation.
St. Elias Ukrainian Cemetery	10193 Heritage Rd	Ukrainian Catholic	St. Elias Parish	1970s–present	Adjacent to the historic St. Elias wood church.
Alloa Cemetery	11680 Creditview Rd	Methodist Roots	City of Brampton	1840s–present	Active rural cemetery serving Alloa community.
Ebenezer United Cemetery	10185 The Gore Rd	United Church	City of Brampton	1830s–1960s	Originally Methodist; heritage designated 2005.
St. Patrick's (Wildfield)	11873 The Gore Rd	Roman Catholic	Archdiocese of Toronto	1830s–present	Historic Catholic parish site.

== Mississauga ==
Name	Address	Denomination	Ownership	Years active	Notes / Sources
Assumption Cemetery	6933 Tomken Rd	Roman Catholic	Archdiocese of Toronto	1968–present	Regional Catholic hub, includes Catholic Cremation Services and multiple mausoleum buildings.
Dixie Union Cemetery	707 Dundas St E	Non-denominational	City of Mississauga	1810–1950s	Features the historic "Stone Chapel" (1837).
St. John's Dixie Cemetery & Crematorium	737 Dundas St E	Non-denominational, originally Anglican	Private / Trust	1810–present	Includes a crematorium, which opened in 1962, and a visitation centre. Offers significant indoor columbarium/niche spaces. Linked with St. John's Dixie Anglican Church
Streetsville Public Cemetery	299 Queen St S	Non-denominational	City of Mississauga	1890–present	Active municipal site.
Streetsville Memorial Cemetery	299 Queen St S	Presbyterian	City of Mississauga	1824–1890	Pioneer site adjacent to the public cemetery.
Eden Cemetery	2830 Derry Rd W	Methodist Roots	City of Mississauga	1840–1980s	Pioneer site for the former village of Lisgar.
Derry West Cemetery	25 Derry Rd W	Anglican	City of Mississauga	1829–1936	Remnant of the village of Derry West.
Erindale Cosmopolitan	1311 Dundas St W	Non-denominational	City of Mississauga	1830s–present	Formerly Erindale Methodist.

== Caledon ==
Name	Address	Denomination	Ownership	Years active	Notes / Sources
Laurel Hill Cemetery	14686 Albion Vaughan Rd	Non-denominational	Town of Caledon	1894–present	Noted for its rare octagonal "deadhouse."
Caledon East Public	17022 Airport Rd	Non-denominational	Town of Caledon	1906–present	Incorporated Brown's Church burying grounds.
Albion Presbyterian	12992 Coleraine Dr	Presbyterian	Town of Caledon	1830s–1940s	Also known as Caven/Old Presbyterian.
Melville White Church	15962 Mississauga Rd	United Church	Town of Caledon	1837–1960s	Designated heritage property and church.
St. Cornelius Cemetery	16631 Kennedy Rd	Roman Catholic	Archdiocese of Toronto	1830s–present	Serves the Silvercreek community.
Belfountain Cemetery	17187 Shaw's Creek Rd	Non-denominational	Town of Caledon	1830s–present	Scenic site overlooking the Credit Valley.
Greenlaw Cemetery	990 The Grange Side Rd	Congregational	Town of Caledon	1852–1941	Pioneer cemetery in Terra Cotta area.

== See also ==
- List of cemeteries in Toronto
- List of cemeteries in York Region
- List of cemeteries in Durham Region
- List of cemeteries in Halton Region
