= List of cemeteries in Toronto =

This is a list of cemeteries in Toronto.

Name	Location	Dates	Interments	Affiliation	Notes	Image
Armadale Free Methodist Cemetery	Armadale 43.829221°N 79.257823°W	1885–		Free Methodist		
Bathurst Lawn Memorial Park	Newtonbrook 43.788097°N 79.442537°W	1929–		Jewish		
Beth Tzedec Memorial Park	Westminster-Branson 43.778310°N 79.445050°W	1949–	4,414	Conservative Judaism	Owned by Beth Tzedec Congregation. Westminster Cemetery is located just to the west.	
Bethel Cemetery	Scarborough Junction 43.730813°N 79.266969°W	1842		Non-denominational		
Bingham Family Cemetery	Princess Gardens 43.68341°N 79.54961°W	1843–1973			Closed and graves moved to Riverside Cemetery. Now residential neighbourhood.	
Christ Church St. James Memorial Garden & Cemetery	Mimico 43.616984°N 79.498001°W	1832–	500	originally Anglican; now non-denominational	Still active	
Christie's Methodist Cemetery	L'Amoreaux 43.799201°N 79.318229°W	1846–1926		Methodist	Today in the parking lot of Bridlewood Mall.	
Dawes Road Cemetery	Clairlea 43.709304°N 79.286152°W	1898	13,000	Jewish		
Duchess Street Burying Ground (Old Scotch Cemetery, Presbyterian Burying Ground)	Moss Park 43.6535198°N 79.3700084°W	~1818–1911 or 1912	~263	Presbyterian (1824–1911)	Linked to Knox Presbyterian Church after 1824, land granted in 1797 and active up to 1840s. The 0.5-acre lot was bounded by Duchess (Richmond) Street to the north, Stonecutters Lane to the east, up to 260 Richmond Street East (Lot 5) to west and Britain Street to the north. Some 263 graves and markers were relocated to Toronto Necropolis in 1911 to 1912 but not all burials recovered as some were found outside the formal boundaries and found after last burials. Built over after closure and now site of commercial buildings with addresses on Richmond and Britain Streets.	
Elia United Church Cemetery	Elia 43.767333°N 79.475856°W	1832–1957		United Church of Canada	Cemetery now parking lot but church remains on site. 20 head stones relocated to northside of church lot.	
Emmanuel United Church Cemetery	Malvern 43.795535°N 79.239542°W	1868–1933		United Church of Canada	Cemetery for the village of Malvern.	
Forest Lawn Mausoleum & Cremation Centre	Willowdale 43.75436°N 79.40986°W	1911–	2400+	Commercial	Owned by Park Lawn Corporation. Crematorium opened in 1980	
Glendale Memorial Gardens	Rexdale 43.748514°N 79.612538°W	1952–		Commercial	Owned by Arbor Memorial Inc	
Highland Memory Gardens	Hillcrest 43.805846°N 79.350184°W	1953–	22,000	Commercial	Owned by Arbor Memorial Inc.	
Holy Blossom Memorial Park	Cliffcrest 43.723138°N 79.243934°W	1929–	2449	Reform Judaism	Owned by Holy Blossom Temple	
Islington Burying Grounds	Islington-City Centre West 43.647985°N 79.529914°W	1807			Oldest cemetery in Etobicoke.	
Jones Avenue Cemetery	Leslieville 43.675659°N 79.338922°W	1883–	581	Orthodox Judaism	Second oldest Jewish cemetery in Toronto.	
Knox United Church Cemetery	Agincourt 43.786234°N 79.278363°W	1844–		United Church of Canada		
Lambton Hills Cemetery	Humber Valley Village 43.674701°N 79.522106°W	1910–	3,271	Jewish		
Lakeshore Psychiatric Hospital Cemetery	Mimico 43.617741°N 79.518474°W	1892–1973	1525	Non-denominational		
McCowan Road Cemetery	Cliffcrest 43.734945°N 79.233802°W	1933–	141	Orthodox Judaism		
Melville Presbyterian Cemetery	West Hill 43.777284°N 79.180323°W	1852–		Presbyterian		
Mount Hope Catholic Cemetery	Sunnybrook 43.715172°N 79.382658°W	1898–	76,000+	Roman Catholic	147 Commonwealth war graves from World War I and II	
Mount Pleasant Cemetery	Moore Park, Toronto/Leaside 43.695833°N 79.384722°W	1876–	168,000	Non-denominational	Owned by Mount Pleasant Group of Cemeteries. Crematorium opened in 1972. Upgraded in 2014 with a near-zero emissions abatement system. Also has a public mausoleum and several family mausoleums.	
Mount Sinai Memorial Park	Downsview 43.730953°N 79.47535°W	1935–	8,205	Jewish		
Pape Avenue Cemetery (Holy Blossom)	Leslieville 43.667627°N 79.339402°W	1849–1930s	293	Reform Judaism	First Jewish cemetery in Toronto. Owned by Holy Blossom Temple.	
Park Lawn Cemetery	Etobicoke 43.647094°N 79.500954°W	1892–	49,000	Commercial	Owned by Park Lawn Corporation	
Pine Hills Cemetery	Scarborough Junction 43.719009°N 79.267731°W	1928–		Non-denominational	Owner by Mount Pleasant Group of Cemeteries. Features Mausoleum of the Risen Christ.	
Pine Ridge Cemetery	Humber Summit 43.75518°N 79.569468°W	1845–		Methodist		
Potters Field	Yorkville 43.670363°N 79.387036°W	1825–1855		Non-denominational	First municipal cemetery, also known as the Strangers Burying Ground. Bodies mostly moved to the Necropolis after it was closed.	
Prospect Cemetery	Earlscourt/Fairbank 43.684563°N 79.455035°W	1890–		Non-denominational	Owned by Mount Pleasant Group of Cemeteries. Includes a public mausoleum.	
Resthaven Memorial Gardens	Cliffside 43.718458°N 79.243366°W	1925–	31,000	Commercial	Owned by Arbor Memorial Inc	
Renforth Baptist Cemetery	Eatonville 43.64351°N 79.572907°W	1838–		Baptist		
Richview Memorial Cemetery	Richview 43.67044°N 79.575072°W	1853–		United Church of Canada	Today within the cloverleaf of highways 401 and 427.	
Riverside Cemetery & Cremation Centre	Humber Heights 43.697557°N 79.531488°W	1892–		Commercial	Owned by Park Lawn Corporation. Has had a crematorium since 1965 and also an indoor mausoleum.	
Roselawn Avenue Cemetery	Forest Hill 43.706314°N 79.420327°W	1905–	5,840	Jewish		
Sanctuary Park Cemetery	Richview 43.698022°N 79.534997°W	1927–		Commercial	Owned by Park Lawn Corporation	
Secor Memorial Park	Woburn 43.754967°N 79.222742°W	1800s (after 1804)		Huguenot (French Protestant)	Family cemetery of the settler Secor family. The Secors were Huguenots and originally members of Reformed Church of France, but also married within the Dutch Reformed Church prior to arriving in the area. Today the cemetery is a park with a memorial cairn.	
Sharon Cemetery	Etobicoke 43.720508°N 79.608021°W	1845–1955		Methodist	The Sharon United Church building was demolished in 1967, but the cemetery beside it remains.	
St. Augustine's Seminary Cemetery	Cliffside 43°42′39.26″N 79°14′29.14″W	1942		Roman Catholic		
St. James Cathedral Cemetery	St. Lawrence 43.650278°N 79.373889°W	1797–1844		Anglican	Original Anglican cemetery in Toronto.	
St. James Cemetery	St. James Town 43.670526°N 79.368163°W	1844–		Non-denominational, originally Anglican. Has had a crematorium since 1948.		
St. John's Norway Cemetery & Crematorium	Upper Beaches 43.673713°N 79.310449°W	1853–	80,000	Non-denominational, originally Anglican. Has an on-site crematorium since 1998.		
St. John's York Mills	York Mills 43.747033°N 79.404744°W	1816–		Anglican	Village cemetery for York Mills. Canadian van Nostrand family monument is located here.	
St. Michael's Cemetery	Deer Park 43.686074°N 79.396109°W	1855–	29,000	Roman Catholic	Oldest Catholic cemetery still in service.	
St. Paul Anglican Church, L'Amoreaux	L'Amoreaux 43.796225°N 79.316204°W	1840s–		Anglican	Church built in 1841 and burned down 1935	
St. Paul's Cemetery	Corktown 43.655777°N 79.362233°W	1822–1857		Roman Catholic	First Catholic cemetery in Toronto. Closed in 1857 and now buried under St. Paul Catholic School play yard on the south side of Queen Street East since 1959.	
Strachan Avenue Military Burying Ground	West of Fort York National Historic Site 43.638183°N 79.409075°W	1863–1911	Approximately 150 soldiers, veterans, their wives and children	Divided into Protestant and Roman Catholic sections		
Taber Hill	Woburn 43.759°N 79.235°W	1250 CE (13th Century)	472	Iroquois	Burial mound and oldest known burial ground in Toronto now part of a city park (Taber Hill Park)	
Taylor Family	Old East York 43.693411°N 79.351113°W	c. 1839		Methodist	Attached to Don Mills United Church.	
Toronto Necropolis	Cabbagetown 43.668282°N 79.360259°W	1850–	50,000+	Non-denominational	Owned by Mount Pleasant Group of Cemeteries. Opened Ontario's first crematorium in 1933. Was decommissioned in 1990 in favour of a more modern facility at Mount Pleasant Cemetery.	
Victoria Memorial Square	Fashion District 43.642638°N 79.4002°W	1793–1863	400	N/A – Established as a military by the British Army station in York, Upper Canada	First European cemetery in Toronto. Abandoned and city park since 1880s, 17 markers remaining and restored in 2007–2011 and home to War of 1812 Monument.	
Westminster Cemetery	Westminster-Branson 43.776620°N 79.455430°W	1926–	Includes a modern mausoleum with indoor glass niches and crypts.	Commercial	Owned by Park Lawn Corporation. Beth Tzedek Memorial Park is located just to the east.	
Willowdale Cemetery (Willowdale Methodist Episcopal Cemetery / Cummer Burial Grounds)	North York City Centre 43.774409°N 79.413864°W	c. 1834		Methodist/United	Cemetery for the village chapel of Willowdale next to the former Willowdale Methodist Church (later United Church and finally as Seven Day Adventist 1954) that was demolished in 1956. West edge of the cemetery was removed for widening of Yonge Street in 1931 with some families relocating graves to other cemeteries. Cemetery lost much of the northern end beyond Horsham Avenue to a shopping plaza in 1950s.	
York Cemetery	Willowdale 43.766111°N 79.416667°W	1948–		Non-denominational	Owned by Mount Pleasant Group of Cemeteries	
York Mills Baptist Church Cemetery	104 York Mills Road 43.745289°N 79.398038°W	1833–1945	24	Baptist	Headstones are visible from York Mills Road, and lay protected behind a fence and hedge. Next door, at 106 York Mills Road, is the historic one-story church manse, now a private residence.	

== See also ==
Other cemeteries in the Greater Toronto Area:

- List of cemeteries in York Region
- List of cemeteries in Peel Region
- List of cemeteries in Durham Region
- List of cemeteries in Halton Region
- List of Jewish cemeteries in the Greater Toronto Area
