= The Necropolis =

The Necropolis can refer to:

- Glasgow Necropolis, Scotland
- Kremlin Wall Necropolis, Moscow, Russia
- Rookwood Cemetery, Sydney, Australia
- Toronto Necropolis cemetery, Toronto, Canada

== See also ==
- Necropolis
