= Edith Firth =

Canadian historian and librarian

- Born: Edith Grace Firth; January 27, 1927; Lindsay, Ontario, Canada
- Died: July 23, 2005 (aged 78); Toronto, Ontario, Canada
- Education: University of Toronto
- Occupations: Historian; Librarian
- Years active: 1949–1983
- Employer: Toronto Public Library

Edith Grace Firth (January 27, 1927 – July 23, 2005) was a Canadian historian and librarian. She began working for the staff of the Toronto Public Library in 1949, joining its reference division before becoming the head of the Treasure Room containing the library's rare books. Firth was the author of the book of early Toronto and art. She was made head of the Canadian History Department at the Metropolitan Toronto Library in 1977 and retired in 1982.

== Early life ==
Firth was born on January 27, 1927 in Lindsay, Ontario. She was the youngest of four children to the science teacher Thomas Firth and Amy Edge Firth; she had a brother and two sisters. Firth attended North Bay Collegiate Institute and won a scholarship to attend the University of Toronto. She graduated with an honours degree in modern history and a library science degree.

== Career ==
Following graduation, Firth joined the staff of the reference division of the Toronto Public Library in 1949. She was appointed the person responsible for managing the Treasure Room containing the library's rare books, particularly rare Canadiana, in 1952. Firth developed the Treasure Room, searching across North America for any documentation on the early history of Toronto and one of Canada's earliest cities, York, and constructing the library's collection into what Lorraine Synder wrote in Firth's entry in The Canadian Encyclopedia "is now considered a basic research tool for all historians and writers of early Canadian history".

As he worked for the Toronto Public Library, she studied for a master's degree in history and prepared for her maiden publication, Guide to the Manuscript Collections in the Toronto Public Libraries, which was published in 1954. Firth became head of the Baldwin Room of Manuscripts and Canadiana in the library's Reference Library Addition in its St. George and College Streets building in 1960. She was the author of the 1962 book The Town of York 1793–1815, having spent three years collating and editing early Toronto history documents from the library's collections, federal and provincial archives and several repositories across Canada and the United States. Firth complied The Town of York, 1815–1834: A Further Collection of Documents of Early Toronto in 1967, as well as numerous guides and catalogues on Toronto including Early Toronto Newspapers, 1793–1867. She was head of the Canadian History Department at the Metropolitan Toronto Library from 1977, until she retired in January 1982. In 1983, Firth published Toronto Art: 150 Years through Artists Eyes about 70 works by 130 artists selected for their works depicting Toronto.

Firth was the recipient of the American Association for State and Local History Certificate of Merit in 1963, the Canadian Historical Association Certificate of Merit for Local History in 1967, the Centennial Medal in 1967, the Toronto Historical Board Award of Merit in 1974 the City of Toronto Book Award in 1984 and an Honorary Doctorate of Laws from Trent University. She was general editor of the Ontario Series of the Champlain Society Council and Publishing Committee between 1963 and 1971, the Executive Committee of the Ontario Historical Society from 1965 to 1967 and the Editorial Board from 1972 to 1977. Firth was a member of the National Archival Appraisal Board, the Presbyterian Church General Assembly on History, Bibliographical Society Canada from 1964 to 1967 and again from 1973 to 1977, the Multicultural History Society of Ontario and the Ontario Historical Studies Series.

== Death ==
She died of Alzheimer's disease in Toronto on July 23, 2005. Firth received a private burial service at the Durham Cemetery.
