= The Potter's Field =

A potter's field is a graveyard where unknown or indigent people are buried.

Potter's Field or The Potter's Field may refer to:

== Bible ==
- the potter's field purchased with the money of Judas Iscariot, Akeldama
- purchase of the potter's field, in the biblical book of Zechariah

== Places ==
- Potter's Field (Omaha), a cemetery
- Potters Fields Park, a park in the London Borough of Southwark
- Strangers' Burying Ground or Potter's Field, a former cemetery in Toronto

== Arts ==
- The Potter's Field (Peters novel), a 1989 medieval mystery novel by Ellis Peters
  - The Potter's Field, Season 4 Episode 2 of Cadfael based on the Peters novel
- The Potter's Field (Camilleri novel), a 2008 novel by Andrea Camilleri
- Potter's Field (album), a 2004 album by 12 Stones
- "Potters Field", a song from the 1993 album Sound of White Noise by Anthrax
- "Potter's Field", a song from Foreign Affairs (Tom Waits album), 1977
