= List of cemeteries in Durham Region =

The following is a list of cemeteries and burial sites within the Regional Municipality of Durham, Ontario, Canada, categorized by municipality.

== Pickering and Ajax ==
Name	Address	Denomination	Ownership	Years Active	Notes / Sources
Duffin Meadows Cemetery	2505 Brock Rd, Pickering	Non-denominational	Mount Pleasant Group	1993–present	Features a dedicated natural burial section.
Erskine Cemetery	984 Finch Ave, Pickering	United Church	Dunbarton-Fairport United	1854–present	Established alongside the historic Erskine Church.
Pine Ridge Memorial Gardens	1757 Church St N, Ajax	Commercial	Arbor Memorial	1980s–present	Large private facility serving the Ajax-Pickering area. Crematorium opened in 1985. Offers modern indoor mausoleum spaces and columbaria.
Society of Friends Cemetery	Mill St, Ajax (Pickering Village)	Society of Friends	Town of Ajax	1813–1930s	Historic Quaker burial ground in the former Pickering Village.

== Whitby and Oshawa ==
Name	Address	Denomination	Ownership	Years Active	Notes / Sources
Oshawa Union Cemetery	760 King St W, Oshawa	Non-denominational	City of Oshawa	1837–present	One of the oldest and largest in the region. Features a historic Egypto-Roman style mausoleum built in 1926 with 310 permanent crypts and a marble interior.
Thornton Cemetery	1200 Thornton Rd N, Oshawa	Non-denominational	Mount Pleasant Group	1980s–present	Modern facility with a large cremation garden. Crematorium opened in 1985. Features a large indoor mausoleum with climate control and private family crypt options.
Groveside Cemetery	5155 Baldwin St S, Whitby	Non-denominational	Town of Whitby	1874–present	Managed by a municipal board; serves Whitby and Brooklin.
Mount Lawn Cemetery	21 Garrard Rd, Whitby	Commercial	[[[Arbor Memorial]]	1928–present	Private site, includes a crematorium and extensive cremation gardens. Features extensive above-ground interment options, including mausoleums and columbaria.
St. John's Anglican Cemetery	150 Victoria St E, Whitby	Anglican	St. John's Parish	1846–present	Historic site overlooking the Whitby harbour area.
Resurrection Catholic Cemetery	355 Taunton Rd E, Whitby	Roman Catholic	Archdiocese of Toronto	1964–present	Regional Catholic cemetery for central Durham. Features the Prayer Garden of the Evangelists and an indoor mausoleum offering crypts and glass-front niches.

== Clarington ==
Name	Address	Denomination	Ownership	Years Active	Notes / Sources
Bowmanville Cemetery	1330 Haines St, Bowmanville	Non-denominational	Municipality of Clarington	1857–present	Main municipal cemetery for Bowmanville. Crematorium opened in 2012.
St. George's Cemetery	2 Browview Rd, Newcastle	Non-denominational, originally Anglican	Municipality of Clarington	1873–present	Final resting place of Samuel Wilmot, early Ontario surveyor.
Bond Head Cemetery	Queen Victoria St & Park Ln, Newcastle	Non-denominational, originally Anglican	Municipality of Clarington	1857–present	Originally established by St. George's Church.
Lakeview Cemetery	4449 Hill St, Newtonville	Non-denominational	Municipality of Clarington	1830–present	Originally donated by the Laing family.

== Northern Townships (Scugog, Uxbridge, Brock) ==
Name	Address	Denomination	Ownership	Years Active	Notes / Sources
Pinegrove Cemetery	1 Jeffrey St, Prince Albert	Non-denominational	Private Board	1850s–present	Primary cemetery for the Port Perry area.
Union Cemetery (Beaverton)	B1395 Main St, Beaverton	Non-denominational, originally Presbyterian	Township of Brock	1851–present	Also known as Riverside Cemetery.
Scotch Cemetery	C1945 Hwy 7, Manilla	Non-denominational, originally Presbyterian	Township of Brock	1853–present	Established by early Scottish settlers in Manilla.
Hillman Cemetery	14275 Marsh Hill Rd, Port Perry	Non-denominational	Township of Scugog	1850s–present	Active historic site near Utica.

== See also ==
- List of cemeteries in Toronto
- List of cemeteries in York Region
- List of cemeteries in Peel Region
- List of cemeteries in Halton Region
