= List of cemeteries in Halton Region =

This is a list of cemeteries in Halton Region, Ontario, Canada.

== Burlington ==
Cemetery	Community	Address	Affiliation	Years active	Notes
Appleby Cemetery	Burlington	2200 Appleby Line	Methodist / Pioneer	1861–present	Located at Appleby Line and Harvester Rd.
Bayview Cemetery	Burlington	740 Spring Gardens Rd	Municipal	1920s–present	Operated by the City of Burlington.
Beth Jacob Cemetery	Burlington	1195 Snake Rd	Jewish	1887–present	Serving the Beth Jacob Congregation. Includes the former Grand Order of Israel Cemetery.
Bradt Cemetery	Burlington	South Service Rd	Pioneer	1810s–1880s	Historic family plot.
Burlington Memorial Gardens	Burlington	3353 Guelph Line	Commercial	1970s–present	Operated by Arbor Memorial.
East Plains United Church Cemetery	Burlington	375 Plains Rd E	United Church	1843–present	Cemetery of East Plains United Church.
Gate of Heaven Cemetery	Burlington	580 Old York Rd	Catholic	1980s–present	Operated by the Catholic Cemeteries of the Diocese of Hamilton.
Greenwood Cemetery	Burlington	1030 Greenwood Dr	Municipal	1888–present	Municipal cemetery.
Holy Sepulchre Cemetery	Burlington	600 Spring Gardens Rd	Catholic	1875–present	Diocese of Hamilton.
Nelson United Church Cemetery	Burlington	2437 Dundas St	United Church	1830–present	Historic church cemetery.
St. Luke's Anglican Church Cemetery	Burlington	1382 Ontario St	Anglican	1834–present	Cemetery of St. Luke’s Anglican Church.
Woodland Cemetery	Burlington	700 Spring Gardens Rd	Municipal	1910s–present	Operated by the City of Burlington.

== Halton Hills ==
Cemetery	Community	Address	Affiliation	Years active	Notes
Acton Pioneer Cemetery	Acton	41 Moore Ave	Pioneer	1840s–1880s	Historic pioneer cemetery.
Devereaux Cemetery	Georgetown	11317 Trafalgar Rd	Catholic	2020–present	Diocese of Hamilton.
Fairview Cemetery	Acton	118 Mill St E	Municipal	1880s–present	Operated by the Town of Halton Hills.
Glen Williams Cemetery	Glen Williams	15155 Main St	Community	1830s–present	Historic village cemetery.
Greenwood Cemetery	Georgetown	100 Greenwood Ct	Municipal	1870s–present	Main cemetery for Georgetown.
Hillcrest Cemetery	Norval	411 Highway 7	Community	1880s–present	Community cemetery.
Holy Redeemer Cemetery	Georgetown	12337 17th Side Rd	Catholic	1980s–present	Diocese of Hamilton.
Limehouse Presbyterian Cemetery	Limehouse	12389 Fifth Line	Presbyterian	1860s–present	Historic church cemetery.
St. George's Anglican Cemetery	Georgetown	60 Guelph St	Anglican	1850s–present	Cemetery of St. George’s Anglican Church.
Union Presbyterian Cemetery	Halton Hills	13335 15th Side Rd	Presbyterian	1840s–present	Historic Presbyterian cemetery.

== Milton ==
Cemetery	Community	Address	Affiliation	Years active	Notes
Campbellville Burying Ground	Campbellville	35 Crawford Cres	Pioneer	1830s–1890s	Historic pioneer cemetery.
Milton Evergreen Cemetery	Milton	230 Ontario St S	Non-profit	1881–present	Community-run cemetery.
Milton Pioneer Cemetery	Milton	191 Bronte St S	Municipal	1820s–1880s	Also known as Bronte Street Pioneer Cemetery.
Nassagaweya Presbyterian Church Cemetery	Milton	3097 15th Side Rd	Presbyterian	1840s–present	Historic church cemetery.
Omagh Presbyterian Cemetery	Omagh	8815 Britannia Rd	Presbyterian	1840s–present	Historic cemetery.
St. David's Presbyterian Church Cemetery	Campbellville	132 Main St	Presbyterian	1860s–present	Church cemetery.
St. John's Anglican Church Cemetery	Milton	10002 Guelph Line	Anglican	1840s–present	Cemetery of St. John's Anglican Church.

== Oakville ==
Cemetery	Community	Address	Affiliation	Years active	Notes
Bronte Cemetery	Oakville	79 West River St	Pioneer	1830s–1970s	Historic pioneer cemetery.
Glen Oaks Memorial Gardens	Oakville	3164 Ninth Line	Commercial	1980s–present	Operated by Arbor Memorial.
Merton Cemetery	Oakville	2356 Upper Middle Rd W	Pioneer	1840s–1890s	Historic pioneer cemetery.
Munn's Cemetery	Oakville	1 Munn's Ave	United Church	1820s–present	Cemetery associated with Munn's United Church.
Oakville / St. Mary's Cemetery	Oakville	11 Lyons Lane	Municipal / Catholic	1850s–present	Joint municipal and Catholic cemetery.
Palermo Cemetery	Palermo	3120 Dundas St W	Pioneer	1810s–1950s	Historic pioneer cemetery.
St. Jude's Cemetery	Oakville	258 Lakeshore Rd W	Municipal	1850s–present	Originally Anglican cemetery.
St. Volodymyr Ukrainian Cemetery	Oakville	1280 Dundas St W	Ukrainian Orthodox	1980s–present	Ukrainian Orthodox cemetery.
Trafalgar Lawn Cemetery	Oakville	1149 Dundas St W	Municipal	1950s–present	Municipal cemetery.
Wedgewood Cemetery	Oakville	565 Wedgewood Dr	Pioneer	1820s–1870s	Historic pioneer cemetery.

== See also ==
- List of cemeteries in Toronto
- List of cemeteries in York Region
- List of cemeteries in Peel Region
- List of cemeteries in Durham Region
