= Toronto Necropolis =

Rural cemetery in Toronto, Canada

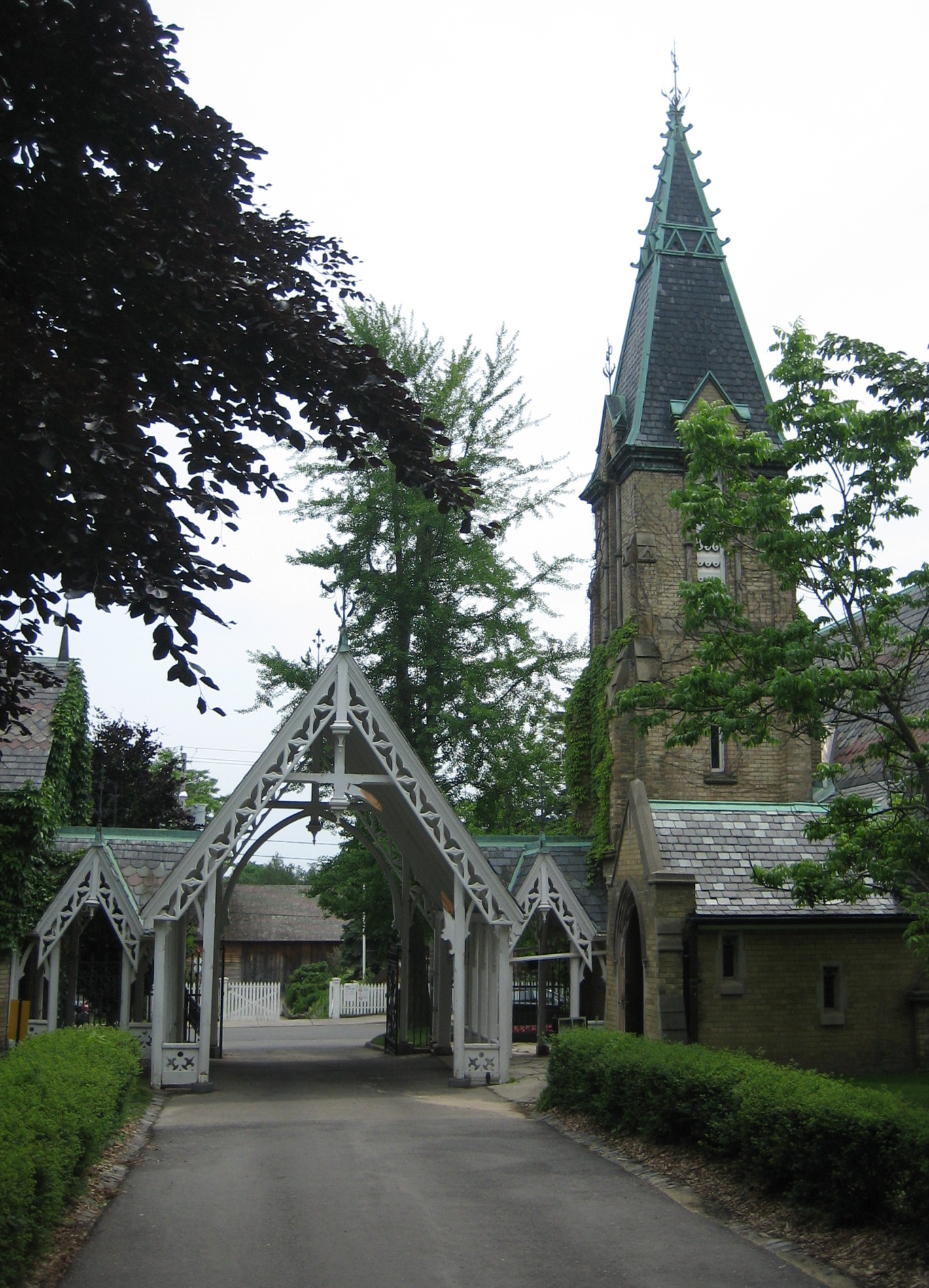
- The entrance to the Necropolis
- Interactive map of Toronto Necropolis

Details
- Established: 1850s
- Location: 200 Winchester Street; Toronto, Ontario, Canada
- Coordinates: 43.667958°N 79.361484°W
- Type: Non-profit, non-denominational
- Style: Rural
- Owned by: Mount Pleasant Group of Cemeteries as trustee of a provincial statutory trust
- No. of graves: 50,000+
- Website: mountpleasantgroup.com
- Find a Grave: Toronto Necropolis

Toronto Necropolis is a non-denominational cemetery in Toronto, Ontario, Canada. It is located on the west side of the Don River valley, to the north of Riverdale Farm in the Cabbagetown neighbourhood and adjacent to St. James Cemetery.

The cemetery was opened during the 1850s to replace the Strangers' Burying Ground, which had been established in 1826 and closed in 1855. It is part of the non-profit Mount Pleasant Group of Cemeteries, which also includes Mount Pleasant Cemetery and York Cemetery in Toronto, among others. The Necropolis Chapel was built in 1872 and designed by Henry Langley.

In 1933, the Necropolis opened Ontario's first crematorium. The facility remained in operation until 1990 when it was decommissioned, in favour of a more modern facility at Mount Pleasant Cemetery.

== Notable interments ==
- Dr. Anderson Ruffin Abbott – first Canadian-born black surgeon
  - His father Wilson Ruffin Abbott – successful Black Canadian businessman and landowner
- George Blewett (1873–1912) – academic and philosopher
- Thornton Blackburn – former slave who made his way to Canada on the "Underground Railroad" and established the first cab company in Toronto (1890)
- Joseph Bloore – for whom a major Toronto thoroughfare, Bloor Street, is named
- George Brown – One of the Fathers of Confederation and founder of what is now The Globe and Mail
- Henry Box Brown – African American who famously escaped slavery in 1848 by mailing himself in a custom-made box from Richmond to Philadelphia; he later became a lecturer and entertainer, spending his last two decades in Toronto
- Roy Brown (RAF officer) – World War I fighter pilot, officially credited with shooting down Manfred von Richthofen, the "Red Baron"
- Durlin D. Bushell, Augustus White, Howard Harris and Arthur Green – Royal Air Force pilots who died from Spanish flu (1918)
- Kay Christie (1911–1994) – Canadian Nursing Sister in Hong Kong during the Japanese Invasion during World War II; one of two Canadian Nursing sisters to have been held as a Prisoner of War
- Mollie Christie (1913–2013) – Prominent figure in the early days of Toronto's social welfare services; founding Executive Director of the Community Information Centre of Metropolitan Toronto (now accessible by "211" help line and 211.ontario.ca website)
- Ralph Day (1898–1976) – Toronto mayor from 1938 to 1940
- Ainsworth Dyer – a corporal in Princess Patricia's Canadian Light Infantry who died in Afghanistan in 2002
- Robert Alexander Fyfe (1816–1878) – Canadian educator and churchman (first President of Woodstock College)
- Robert Gonsalves (1959 - 2017) – Canadian painter; known for his use of magical realism.
- Ned Hanlan – world-champion oarsman; Hanlan's Point Beach was named after the family hotel at Hanlan's Point, built c. 1870 by his father, John, a fisherman-turned-hotelier
- William Holmes Howland – Mayor of Toronto
- William Peyton Hubbard (1842–1935) – first black Toronto city alderman, city controller, deputy mayor
- James Laxer (1941–2018) – professor, political economist, politician
- Robert Laxer (1915–1998) – psychologist, professor, author, political activist
- Jack Layton (1950–2011) – politician (Toronto City Councillor, later leader of the New Democratic Party and Leader of the Official Opposition)
- Charles Lindsey – editor-in-chief of the Toronto Daily Leader and son-in-law of William Lyon Mackenzie (1908)
- Samuel Lount – Upper Canada MLA; an organizer of the Upper Canada Rebellion of 1837, for which he was hanged, and so made martyr to the Upper Canadian Reform movement
- Monument honouring Samuel Lount and Peter Matthews – rebels from the Rebellion of 1837
- Senator John Macdonald (1824–1890) – Canadian merchant, churchman, philanthropist, and politician
- William Lyon Mackenzie – Toronto's first mayor and leader of the 1837 Upper Canada Rebellion
- Major Wylie McCabe – Irish Regiment of Canada and aide-de-camp to General Charles Foulkes
- Andrew Porteous – first person to be buried at Necropolis 1850
- John Ross Robertson – founder of the Toronto Telegram
- George A. Romero (1940–2017) – noted American-Canadian filmmaker; father of the zombie film genre through his Night of the Living Dead series
- Beverly Randolph Snow (1799–1856) – Born enslaved, and manumitted in 1829, he became an early black entrepreneur and restaurateur in Washington DC and then Toronto; his Epicurean Eating House was destroyed in August 1835 by a white mob during a race riot subsequently known as the "Snow Riot" or "Snow Storm"
- Joseph Burr Tyrrell (1858–1957) – discovered that dinosaurs once roamed Alberta's Bad Lands
- David Ward (1817–1881) & family – English-born settler of Ward's Island, interred along with four of his five daughters at Plot F-157. David was a fisherman and hotelier for whom Ward's Island was named. Lost his five surviving daughters to drowning in Lake Ontario on May 11, 1862, in a boating mishap. A son, William, survived. (William's first wife, Charlotte Ford, also died young, of tuberculosis, and is also interred here. A close friend, rower Ned Hanlan, above, had served as a witness to their wedding.)

The cemetery contains the war graves of 34 Commonwealth service personnel, 29 from World War I and five from World War II. Most of these are in Section X.

The cemetery has over 50,000 bodies. It is used to bury bodies used for research at the University of Toronto and is now part of the Mount Pleasant Group of Cemeteries.

The cemetery's crematorium was built in 1933.

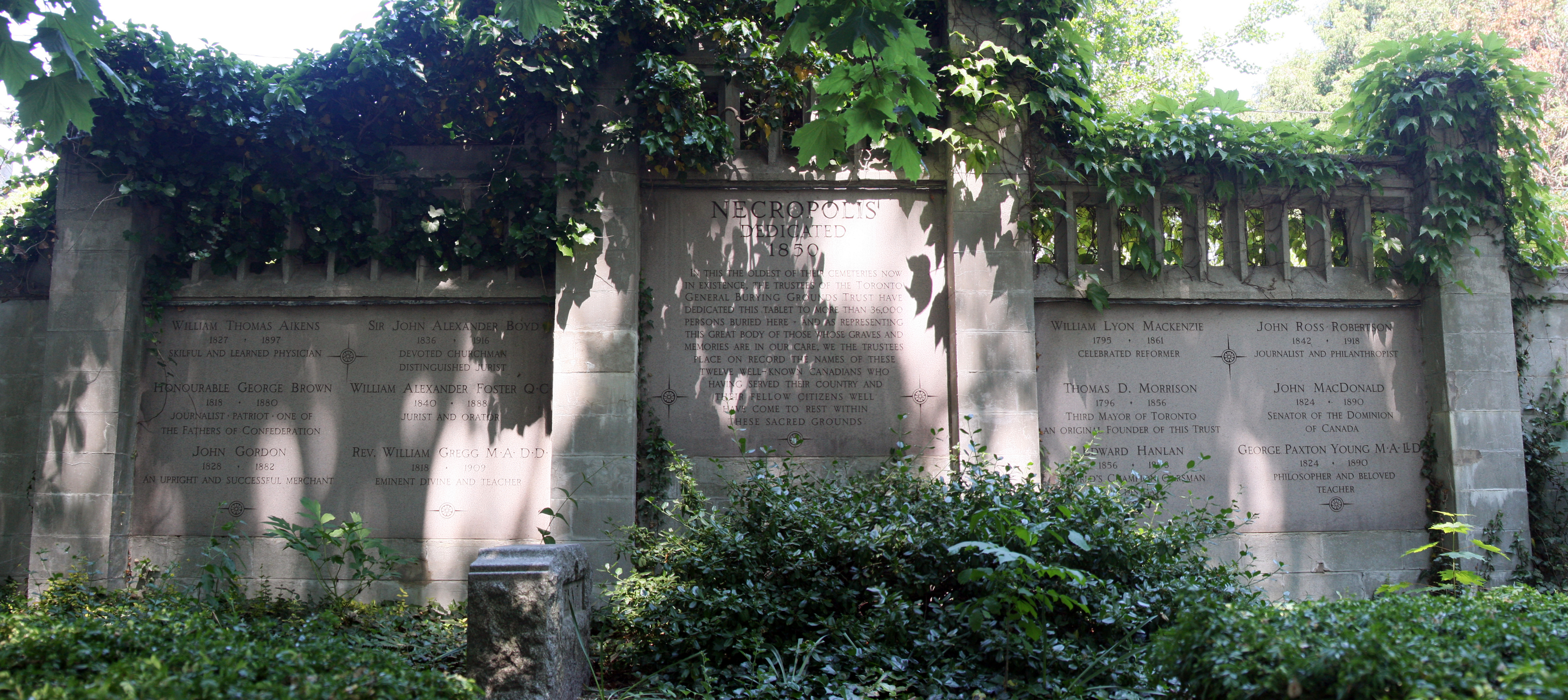
The Necropolis is the final resting place of such prominent individuals as Toronto's first mayor, William Lyon Mackenzie, journalist George Brown, founder of what is now The Globe and Mail, John Ross Robertson, founder of the Toronto Telegram, and, more recently, Federal NDP Leader, Jack Layton.

== See also ==
- List of cemeteries in Toronto
- Necropolis
