= George Blewett =

Canadian rofessor, philosopher, and author (1873–1912)

The Reverend George Blewett
- Born: George John Blewett; 9 December 1873; Yarmouth, Ontario, Canada
- Died: 9 August 1912 (aged 38); Go Home Bay, Ontario, Canada
- Spouse: Clara Woodsworth (m. 1906)

Ecclesiastical career
- Religion: Christianity (Methodist)
- Church: Methodist Church
- Ordained: 1898

Academic background
- Education: Victoria University, Toronto; Harvard University
- Thesis: The Metaphysical Basis of Preceptive Ethics (1900)
- Influences: Edward Caird; G. W. F. Hegel

Academic work
- Discipline: Philosophy; theology
- Sub-discipline: Historical theology; moral philosophy; philosophy of religion
- School or tradition: Hegelianism; idealism; Social Gospel; theological liberalism
- Institutions: Wesley College; Victoria University, Toronto
- Influenced: E. J. Pratt; J. S. Woodsworth

George John Blewett (9 December 1873 – 9 August 1912) was a Canadian philosopher and theologian. He was English Canada's first native-born philosopher.

== Biography ==
Born on 9 December 1873, in Yarmouth Township in Elgin County, Ontario, the son of William Blewett, a farmer, and Mary Baker, he was raised on a farm near St. Thomas, Ontario. In 1897, he graduated from Victoria University in the University of Toronto. He studied at the University of Würzburg in 1899 and received a Doctor of Philosophy degree in philosophy in 1900 from Harvard University. He also did postgraduate work at Oxford University and Cambridge University.

In 1901, he became a lecturer in philosophy at Wesley College, Winnipeg. In 1906, he became the Ryerson Professor of moral philosophy at Victoria University. In 1907, he wrote The Study of Nature and the Vision of God: With Other Essays in Philosophy. His second book The Christian View of the World was published in 1912.

He drowned while swimming, apparently the result of a heart attack, in Go Home Bay, Ontario, on 15 August 1912. He was buried in the Necropolis Cemetery.
