= Park Lawn Cemetery =

Canadian cemetery in Toronto

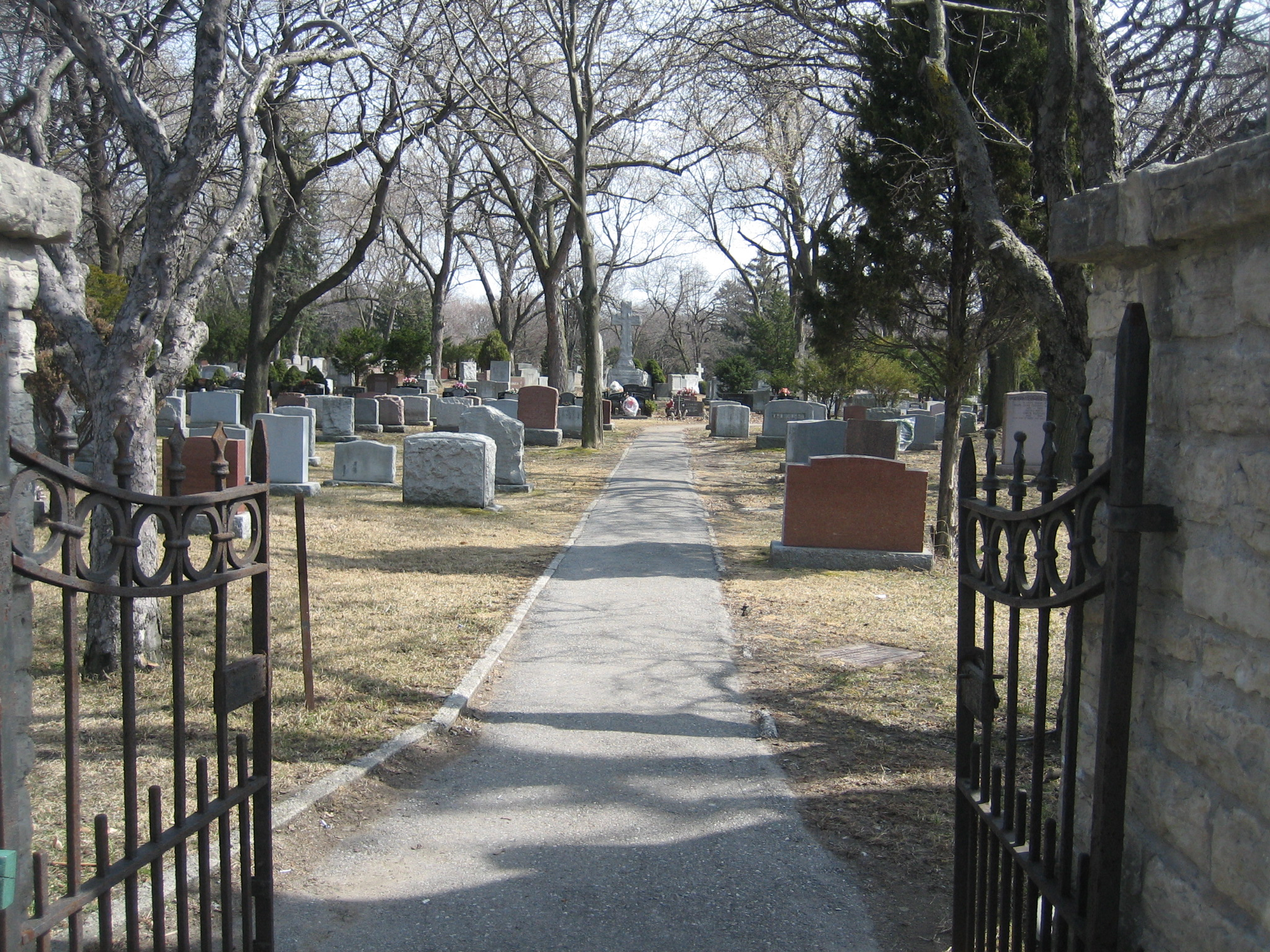
- Northwest entrance to Park Lawn Cemetery.
- Interactive map of Park Lawn Cemetery

Details
- Established: 1892
- Location: 2845 Bloor Street West; Toronto, Ontario; M8X 1A6
- Coordinates: 43.647094°N 79.500954°W
- Type: Public
- Style: Non-denominational
- Owned by: Park Lawn Corporation
- No. of graves: 49,000
- Website: www.parklawnlp.ca
- Find a Grave: Park Lawn Cemetery

Park Lawn Cemetery is a large cemetery in the Etobicoke district of Toronto, Ontario, Canada. It currently has around 22,000 graves. It is managed by the Park Lawn Corporation, which also runs five other cemeteries in Toronto. The cemetery offers ground burials and a mausoleum for above-ground interment and cremation urns. It is located south of Bloor Street, west of the Humber River.

== History ==
Park Lawn Cemetery & Mausoleum opened in 1892 as Humbervale Cemetery and was owned by local farmers in the area. It was sold in 1912 and again in 1915 to Park Lawn Cemetery Company, and was renamed to the current name. In 1999, Park Lawn opened Paradise Mausoleum; phase two of Paradise Mausoleum was completed in 2007.

In 1995, a section of the cemetery was re-zoned to permit construction of a condominium building. While the building was opposed by lot owners, the Ontario Municipal Board approved the project. The cemetery has twice been attacked by vandals, once in 1990 and again in 2006. Both times several youths were convicted of damaging or toppling several hundred stones.

The cemetery contains a mass grave containing the remains of 75 "home children" from Britain.

== Park Lawn Corporation ==
Park Lawn Corporation
- Type: Public
- Traded as: TSX: PLC
- Industry: Funeral services
- Founded: 1892
- Headquarters: Toronto, Ontario, Canada
- Area served: Canada, United States
- Services: Funeral homes, cemeteries, cremation services

Park Lawn Corporation is a Canadian provider of funeral, cremation, and cemetery services headquartered in Toronto, Ontario. Founded in 1892 as the operator of Park Lawn Cemetery in Toronto, the company expanded over time through acquisitions and the development of additional funeral homes and cemeteries. The corporation operates a network of funeral homes, cemeteries, crematoria, and related memorial services across Canada and the United States.

Park Lawn listed its shares on the Toronto Stock Exchange in 2016 and subsequently expanded through acquisitions in both Canada and the United States. By the mid-2020s, the company operated approximately 176 funeral homes and 76 cemeteries across Ontario, Quebec, and numerous U.S. states.

=== History ===
==== Acquisition of Westside Cemeteries ====
In 2002, Park Lawn Corporation purchased Westside Cemeteries Ltd. from Service Corporation International, acquiring five cemeteries in the Greater Toronto Area.

The acquisition included:

- Riverside Cemetery & Crematorium in Humber Heights-Westmount, Etobicoke, founded in 1892. Former Mayor Rob Ford and his father, former MPP Doug Ford Sr., are buried there.
- Sanctuary Park Cemetery, located across the road from Riverside Cemetery, founded in 1927.
- Westminster Cemetery, located in North York along Bathurst Street south of Steeles Avenue, founded in 1926.
- Forest Lawn Mausoleum & Cremation Centre in North York on Yonge Street north of Highway 401. The mausoleum opened in 1911 and added a crematorium in 1980. Sir Henry Pellatt, one of the mausoleum's original directors, is entombed there, as are Neilson Dairy founder William Neilson and members of the Neilson family.
- Hillcrest Cemetery in Woodbridge, Ontario, opened in 1916.

==== Expansion into funeral services ====
In 2014, Park Lawn expanded into the funeral home business by purchasing a 50 per cent interest in the Tubman funeral home chain, which operates several funeral homes in Ontario and Quebec. Tubman Funeral Homes was founded in Ottawa in 1921 and is among the oldest funeral service providers in the region.

In 2015, the company acquired Basic Funerals and Cremation Choices, a provider of low-cost funeral and cremation services operating in Ottawa and the Greater Toronto Area.

==== Public listing and expansion ====
In 2016, Park Lawn Corporation listed its shares on the Toronto Stock Exchange.

During the late 2010s and early 2020s the company pursued an acquisition-driven growth strategy, purchasing funeral homes and cemeteries across Canada and the United States.

== Notable interments ==
=== Athletes ===
- Harold Ballard – minor league hockey coach, manager, National Hockey League (NHL) owner Toronto Maple Leafs
- Glen Brydson – NHL player
- Lou Cavalaris Jr. – Canadian Horse Racing Hall of Fame trainer
- Hans Fogh – Olympic sailor for Denmark and Canada
- Busher Jackson – NHL player
- Butch Keeling – NHL player, minor league coach, NHL referee
- Andy Kyle – former Cincinnati Reds outfielder, minor league baseball player, hockey player with the National Hockey Association (NHA) Toronto Blueshirts, golf player
- Jack Marks – NHL and minor league hockey player
- Lou Marsh – sprinter, Toronto Argonauts football player, Canadian military officer, NHL referee, Toronto Star sports editor
- Eugene Melnyk – businessman, owner of the Ottawa Senators
- Alex Romeril – minor league and NHA player, NHL referee, Toronto Maple Leafs head coach
- Marjory Shedd - champion badminton player
- Conn Smythe – ice hockey player and coach, owner of the NHL Toronto Maple Leafs
- Faye Urban – tennis player

=== Politicians ===
- Fergy Brown – Metro Toronto Councillor, city councillor mayor of York, Ontario
- John MacBeth – Ontario PC MPP (York West and Humber) and provincial cabinet minister

=== Musicians ===
- Jeff Healey – jazz and blues musician

=== Businesspersons ===
- George Harding Cuthbertson – founding partner of Cuthbertson & Cassian Designs and C&C Yachts
- William McCormick – operated Toronto's High Park Sanitorium and High Park Mineral Baths

=== Military ===
- Wally Floody - Canadian fighter pilot and prisoner of war; led tunnel digging in World War II's Great Escape
- Park Lawn Cemetery contains 96 war graves of Commonwealth service personnel, 19 from World War I and 67 from World War II.

=== Others ===
- Gordon Sinclair – journalist with the Toronto Star and CFRB 1010 radio
- Leone N. Farrell - biochemist and microbiologist whose invention enabled mass production of polio vaccine
- Stanley Frolick – lawyer, Ukrainian Canadian activist
- Adolfas Šapoka – prominent Lithuanian historian and writer

== See also ==
- List of cemeteries in Toronto
- Mount Pleasant Group of Cemeteries
- Arbor Memorial
- Service Corporation International
