= William McCormick (physician) =

Canadian physician

William James McCormick
- Born: June 16, 1880; Belleville, Ontario, Canada
- Died: January 17, 1968 (aged 87); Toronto, Ontario, Canada
- Occupation(s): Physician, nutritionist

Signature
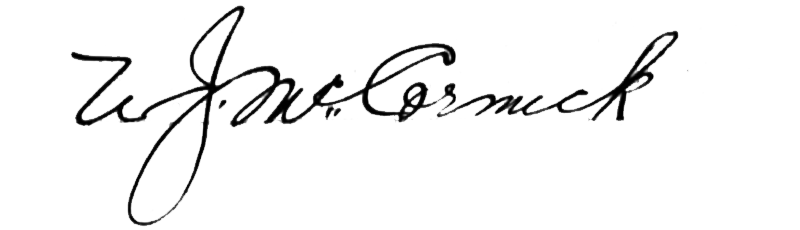

William James McCormick (June 16, 1880 – January 17, 1968) was a Canadian physician and nutritionist. Influenced by the Battle Creek Sanitarium of the Seventh-day Adventist Church, he became an early proponent on the use of Vitamins B and C for treating diseases. In 2004, McCormick was inducted into the Orthomolecular Medicine Hall of Fame.

== Early years ==
William James McCormick was born in Belleville, Ontario on June 16, 1880 to Robert McCormick and Jemima Gay, both Canadian of Irish descent. His father operated a photography business. He was raised in a Protestant family and educated in Belleville High School. He went to University of Michigan and took post graduate work at the American Medical Missionary College which is associated with the Battle Creek Sanitarium in Michigan (later absorbed by the University of Illinois College of Medicine). In 1905, he earned a degree in medicine.

== Career ==
After his marriage with another actor Florence Ellen De L'Horbe in Michigan, McCormick moved back to Canada for medical missionary work. In 1906, he established a nerve treatment facility in the town of Toronto Junction. It was called High Park Sanitarium modelled after Battle Creek Sanitarium. He became the physician in-charge and his wife assisted him in its supervision. At the sanitarium, McCormick explored various treatments for his patients, including diet reform and water therapy.

In 1914, the McCormicks opened the High Park Mineral Baths, which were advertised for their healing mineral-rich spring water. Dubbed the "Minnies," the baths featured a swimming club that attracted both men and women. The facility hosted diving events and even served as a destination for the Canadian artillery during the Great War. McCormick ran the High Park Sanitarium until his wife died in September 1922. The following year, his child drowned while playing near the swimming pool. Despite the experience, he recognized the public value of the baths and kept its operations. He then leased the sanitarium building to Strathcona Hospital, a private maternity hospital.

== Later life ==
McCormick married again in 1925. In the following years, he conducted research on public health from his home. One of his earliest studies surveyed wading pools in different cities in North America, prompting him to issue recommendations on proper sanitation and preventing the spread of epidemics among children. McCormick then shifted his focus to broader public health concerns.

In the 1940s, he conducted clinical and laboratory tests on using vitamins B and C to treat infectious diseases, finding that vitamin C counteracted chemical and bacterial toxins. This led him to advocate for high-dose ascorbic acid (vitamin C) therapy, and he also demonstrated that vitamin C could prevent and cure kidney stones. In recognition of his vitamin research, he was made a member of the American Academy of Applied Nutrition.

McCormick wrote about the benefits of vitamin C on curing cardiovascular disease. He was also the first to propose that vitamin C could strengthen collagen, potentially preventing the spread of cancer cells in the body. He treated high-profile patients, including baseball legend Lou Gehrig and football player Roger Carr. Linus Pauling, the American chemist and Nobel laureate, built his advocacy for the daily intake of vitamin C upon the theoretical writings of McCormick.

== Death ==
McCormick died January 17, 1968. He was laid to rest at Park Lawn Cemetery in Toronto.
