= Toronto Muslim Cemetery =

Muslim cemetery in Richmond Hill, Ontario

Coordinates: 43°57′22″N 79°24′35″W

- Interactive map of Toronto Muslim Cemetery

Details
- Established: 2012
- Location: 13076 Leslie Street, Richmond Hill, Ontario
- Country: Canada
- Type: Muslim
- Owned by: Toronto Muslim Cemetery Corporation
- Size: 36 acres (15 ha)
- Website: www.torontomuslimcemetery.ca

The Toronto Muslim Cemetery is an Muslim cemetery in Richmond Hill, Ontario, Canada. Opened in 2012, the 36-acre (15 ha) cemetery was established to serve Muslims of different denominations in the Greater Toronto Area. It was described at the time of its licensing as the first cemetery in the GTA established to serve both Sunni and Shia Muslims.

The cemetery property, located on Leslie Street north of Stouffville Road, was purchased from Beth Olam Cemetery Corporation for $6.8 million, with an interest-free mortgage provided by the seller. The project was developed jointly by members of the Sunni and Shia Muslim communities, and plans for the 36-acre (15 ha) property called for approximately 40,000 graves. The cemetery received its Ontario cemetery licence in February 2012 and became operational that May. Its official opening ceremony was held on June 24, 2012.

The cemetery was designed in accordance with Islamic funeral practices, with graves oriented toward the qibla, the direction of the Kaaba in Mecca. Unlike Muslim sections within non-denominational cemeteries in the GTA, the property is dedicated to Muslim burials.

== See also ==
- Islamic funeral
- List of Muslim cemeteries in the Greater Toronto Area
