= Milnesville, Ontario =

Milnesville
- Unincorporated community
- Interactive map of Milnesville
- Coordinates: 43°55′12″N 79°16′12″W
- Country: Canada
- Province: Ontario
- Regional municipality: York
- City: Markham
- Established: 1851
- Elevation: 205 m (673 ft)
- Time zone: UTC-5 (EST)
  - Summer (DST): UTC-4 (EDT)
- Area codes: 905 and 289

Milnesville is a historic community of Markham, Ontario on the 8th Line or 8th Concession Road (now as Hwy. 48), between Elgin Mills Road and Major Mackenzie Drive, and the Little Rouge Creek.

== History ==
Milnesville was founded in 1851 by Peter Milne, who acquired lot 26, concession 7. In the 1830s, Peter Milne had been a strong supporter of the reformer William Lyon Mackenzie and Mackenzie's Upper Canada Rebellion. Because of his involvement in the uprising, Milne was arrested on March 21, 1838 and taken to Fort Henry in Kingston. He was eventually pardoned.

In 1852, Milnesville was granted a post office which was run out of the general store operated by John Harrington. The store was located just south of where the Little Rouge Creek crosses Hwy. 48 on the east side on what was David Byer's farm lot. By the end of the 19th century, the community had a saw mill, a blacksmith shop and a cobbler shop.

The Wideman Mennonite Church and Mennonite Cemetery predate the hamlet and are located on the west side of Hwy. 48, just north of the crossing of the Little Rouge. The original log church was already built before 1819 and was likely the earliest church structure built in Markham Township. The present church was constructed in 1928. Beyond the church and cemetery all other buildings (post office, stores) have since disappeared. Milnesville remains an agricultural community only.

In 2008, the Town of Markham recommended the Samuel Wideman House at 10541 Highway 48 in Milnesville be preserved as a significant heritage resource for the community of Milnesville and the Town of Markham.
