= Strangers' Burying Ground =

Cemetery in Toronto, Ontario, Canada

- Interactive map of Strangers' Burying Ground

Details
- Established: 1826
- Closed: 1855
- Location: York, Upper Canada (now Toronto, Ontario)
- Coordinates: 43.67010673°N 79.3887205°W
- Type: Non-denominational
- Style: Rural
- Owned by: York General Burying Ground Trust
- No. of interments: 6,685
- Find a Grave: Strangers' Burying Ground

The Strangers' Burying Ground, also known as Potter's Field, was the first non-denominational cemetery in York, Upper Canada (now Toronto, Ontario). It was established in 1826 as the York General Burying Ground, and it was later known as the Toronto General Burying Ground after the town of York became the city of Toronto in 1834.

The cemetery was located on the northwest corner of what is now the intersection of Yonge Street and Bloor Street. It operated from 1826 to 1855, with an initial £75 land purchase and 300 subscriptions for £1.

== History ==
The cemetery was founded in 1826 by Parliament of Upper Canada which responded to a public petition by passing An act to authorize certain persons therein named, and their successors, to hold certain lands for the purpose therein mentioned for residents who were not Anglican or Catholic – and thus effectively banned from burial in the town's established cemeteries as undesirables. The cemetery was located beyond the legal boundaries of the then-town of York, and within large wooded lots north of Bloor Street.

Many of those buried there were poor or of modest means as well as victims of typhoid, cholera and diphtheria, which were common when there was a lack of sanitation and clean water. The cemetery was laid out in a grid stretching west and north, unlike the well-landscaped St. James Cemetery.

Notable interments included blacksmith Samuel Lount and farmer Peter Matthews who were both hanged for treason for their roles in the 1837 Upper Canada Rebellion.

When the 6-acre cemetery closed in 1855 after 6,685 interments, the families of the deceased were invited to arrange for moving the graves to another cemetery. During the subsequent twenty years, many of the graves were gradually relocated to Toronto Necropolis in the Cabbagetown neighbourhood. The remainder (approximately 3,000) were moved between 1876 and 1881 to Mount Pleasant Cemetery, which opened in November 1876 near the Deer Park neighbourhood.

In 1855, the property was transferred to the Trustees of the General Burying Ground for the purpose of relocating the graves to new cemeteries so that the land could be redeveloped as the Yorkville and then Toronto developed. Families who didn't initially arrange to have remains transferred to the Toronto Necropolis were given 25 years to transfer and have them reinterred at Mount Pleasant. It is thought that not all the remains were relocated.

As Toronto grew, the lands that were once part of the cemetery were acquired and developed for residential use. The area later transformed into the upscale mixed-use (but now mainly commercial) neighbourhood of Yorkville.

== Notable interments ==
- Samuel Lount, who was executed for participating in the Upper Canada Rebellion of 1837
- Peter Matthews, who was executed for participating in the Upper Canada Rebellion of 1837
- James Worts, co-founder of Gooderham and Worts, along with his wife and daughter (all died in 1834, James Worts committed suicide following the death of his wife and daughter during childbirth, and thus would not have been permitted a burial in a church cemetery.)

== See also ==
- List of cemeteries in Toronto
- Victoria Memorial Square
