= Mount Pleasant Cemetery, Toronto =

Cemetery in Ontario, Canada

Mount Pleasant Cemetery
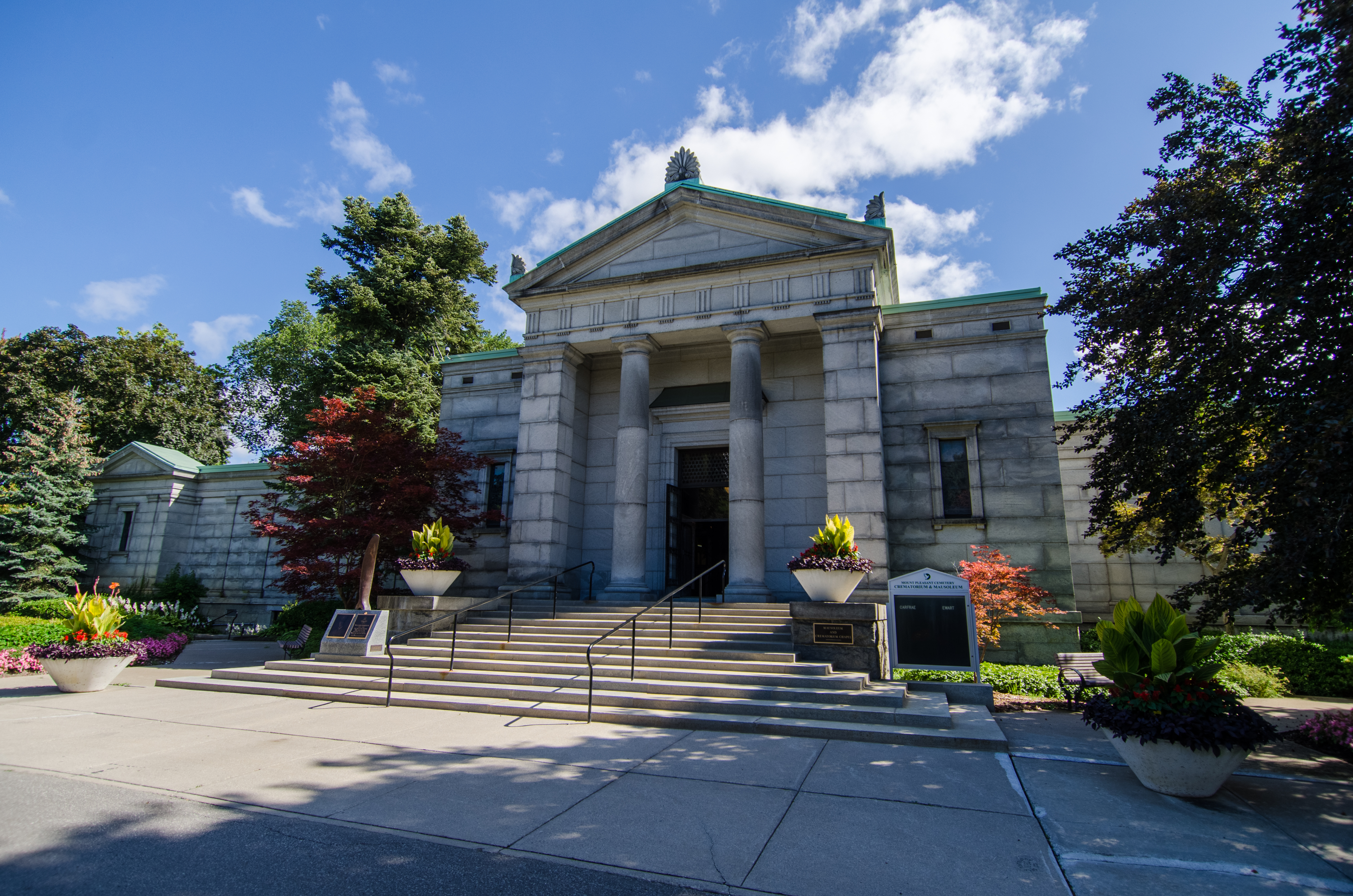
- The cemetery's mausoleum and crematorium
- Interactive map of Mount Pleasant Cemetery

Details
- Established: November 4, 1876
- Location: 375 Mount Pleasant Road; Toronto, Ontario; M4T 2V8
- Coordinates: 43.696351°N 79.384882°W
- Type: Non-profit, non-denominational
- Style: Rural
- Owned by: Mount Pleasant Group
- Website: mountpleasantgroup.com

National Historic Site of Canada
- Official name: Mount Pleasant Cemetery National Historic Site of Canada
- Designated: 2000

Mount Pleasant Cemetery is a cemetery located in Toronto, Ontario, Canada, and is part of the Mount Pleasant Group of Cemeteries. It was opened in November 1876 and is located north of Moore Park, a neighbourhood of Toronto. The cemetery has kilometres of drives and walking paths interspersed with fountains, statues and botanical gardens, as well as rare and distinct trees. It was originally laid out by German-born landscape architect Henry Adolph Engelhardt, inspired by the European and American garden cemeteries of the 19th century, and with influences from Mount Auburn Cemetery in Cambridge, Massachusetts, United States.

As the final resting place of more than 168,000 persons, Mount Pleasant Cemetery contains remarkable architecture amongst its many monuments. The cemetery was designated a National Historic Site of Canada in 2000.

== History ==
In the early 19th century, the only authorized cemeteries within the town of York (predecessor to present-day Toronto) were limited to members of either the Church of England or the Roman Catholic Church. Deceased citizens who did not belong to either of these Christian denominations had no choice but to find burial arrangements outside of the city. Notably, those of Jewish faith who wanted a Jewish burial had to resort to cemeteries beyond Ontario (Montreal and Buffalo) until Pape Avenue Cemetery was opened outside of Toronto in 1849.

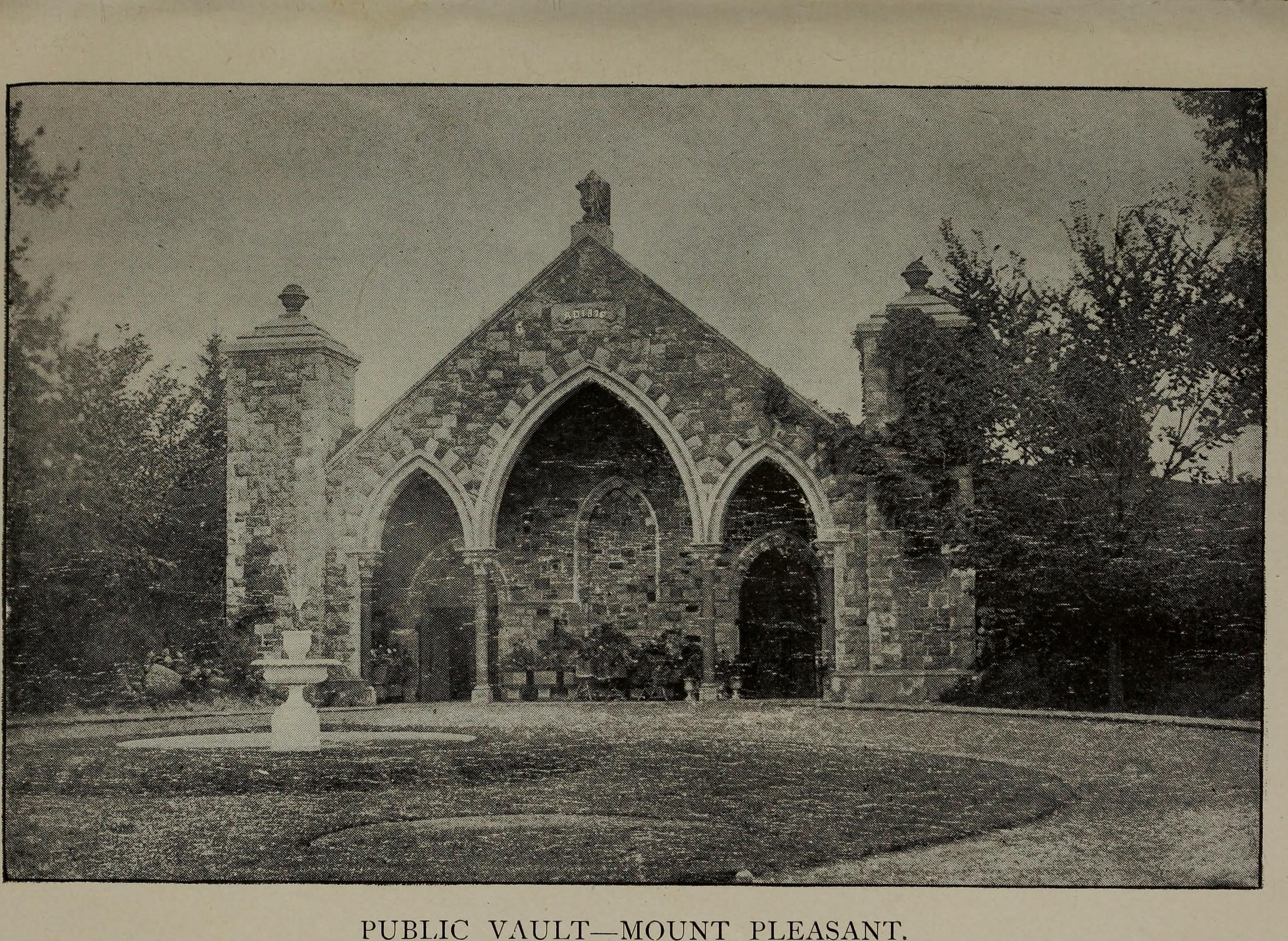
A photograph of the cemetery's public vault, 1891.

In response to a petition to the Legislative Council of Upper Canada, which included "it has become desirable that a Plot be obtained for the purpose of a General Burying Ground, as well for Strangers as for the Inhabitants of the Town, of whatever sect or denomination they may be", a statute named An act to authorize certain persons therein named, and their successors, to hold certain lands for the purpose therein mentioned was passed and received Royal Assent in 1826: Acts of U.C. 7 Geo. IV, c. 21. The land that came to be known as the "Potters Field" was acquired and started operation as a cemetery soon afterwards. Over time, additional cemetery lands were added to what became the Toronto General Burying Ground.

In 1873, a new cemetery available to all citizens was established. The new cemetery was situated on an 81-hectare (200-acre) farm on Lot 19 Concession 3 (also referred to as Yonge Street Farm) that was once owned by the Cawthra family (and likely by William Cawthra) at the far outskirts of the city. Mount Pleasant Cemetery formally opened on 4 November 1876, with more than 19 kilometres (12 miles) of carriage drives along rolling hills and ponds. Mount Pleasant Road was later constructed to pass through the centre of the cemetery and is named after it. The cemetery also has remains and a number of stone markers that were moved from the Potter's Field. The urban expansion of Toronto eventually led to Mount Pleasant Cemetery being situated in the centre of the city.

A number of Canadian servicemen who died during the World Wars were interred at the cemetery. It contains 231 Commonwealth War Graves, comprising 126 burials in World War I and 105 in World War II. 188 are of the Canadian, and 43 the British, armed forces.

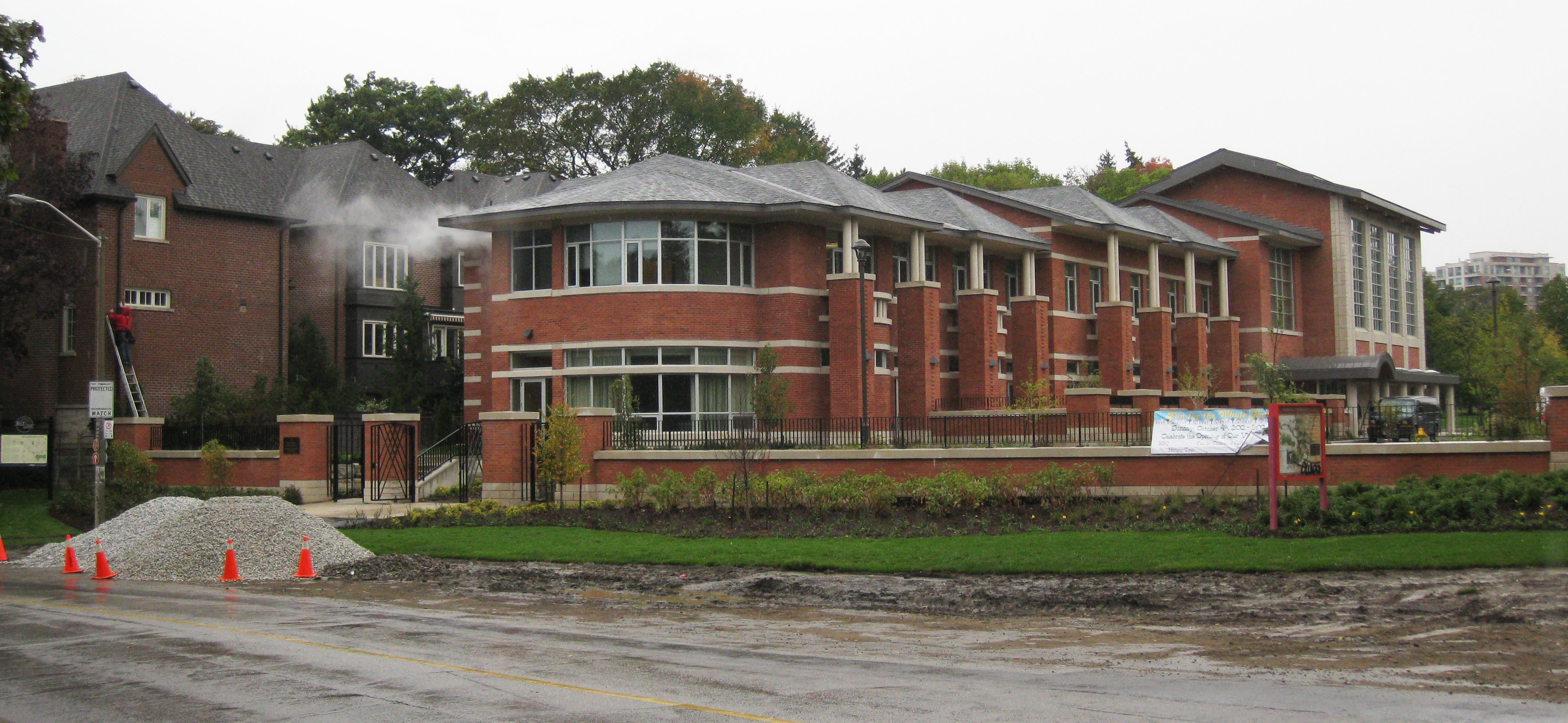
The Visitation Centre was completed in 2009.

In the autumn of 2009, the cemetery opened Mount Pleasant Visitation Centre. The new building is approximately 2,200 square metres (24,000 sq ft) and is built on the property grounds. It was built with the intention to provide visitation space and chapel services.

The cemetery began planning the building as early as 2004, but disputes with the City of Toronto government, local funeral homes, and the Ontario Municipal Board all delayed the project. Changes were made as a result of this process, most notably vehicle access is now through the cemetery grounds only (near the cemetery offices), not directly from Moore Avenue.

== Controversy ==
Despite the cemetery having been created as a public trust by Special Act of the Ontario legislature in 1826 (Toronto General Burying Grounds Act), Mount Pleasant Group began to assert publicly that it had been converted in 1871 into a corporation subject to the Corporations Act of Ontario and that it was no longer a trust. Community activist Margot Boyd and others argued that its status as a public trust remained unchanged.

With donations from the community, Boyd engaged the McCarthy Tetrault law firm in 2009 to review the statutes pertaining to Mount Pleasant Group. An 18-page letter sent to Ontario Premier Dalton McGuinty stated: "Legally, this trust might be characterized in several ways, but an accurate description of the trust in question is a 'public trust.' " Local politicians Toronto Centre MPP Glen Murray and Ward 12 Toronto City Councillor Josh Matlow both agreed at the time.

As early as 2006, Mount Pleasant Group began describing itself as a commercial privately owned entity, and refused to disclose its financial records, giving rise to allegations that it was engaged in the stealth privatization of a public asset. In 2012, Mount Pleasant Group commenced a public relations campaign against Boyd and others in an attempt to deflect criticism, and to discredit its detractors by labelling them NIMBYs.

In December 2012, Boyd and lawyer and community activist Pamela Taylor organized a public trustee election in accordance with the requirements of the 1849 Special Act.

In 2013, over the objections of local residents, Mount Pleasant Group installed a new crematorium. The siting of the facility was a mere 16.5 metres from neighbouring houses, and contrary to Toronto City By-laws. Ward 13 City Councillor Kristyn Wong-Tam sought leave to appeal against the Ontario Ministry of the Environment decision to allow the crematorium.

Also in 2013, Boyd and Taylor, together with historian and environmental consultant Lorraine Tinsley, founded the not-for-profit association Friends of Toronto Public Cemeteries and brought an Application to the Superior Court of Ontario to interpret the cemetery statutes.

== Memorials ==
- To commemorate the 118 lives lost in the fire that destroyed the Great Lakes luxury cruise liner SS Noronic on September 17, 1949, a memorial was erected by the Government of Ontario.
- To commemorate the 167 lives of members of the Salvation Army (1012 people in total died) lost in the sinking of the Empress of Ireland on May 29, 1914, a memorial surrounded by the graves of the deceased was erected by the Toronto unit of the Salvation Army.
- To commemorate the 109 lives lost in the crash of Air Canada Flight 621 on July 5, 1970, a memorial surrounded by graves of many of the dead was erected in May 1971.
- Children's Garden Memorial was created to remember all the stillborn and children without known parents the province buried in one area with no stones or markers.
- A memorial was erected sometime after 1912 in honour of two soldiers killed returning from a training exercise in 1912 and as a monument to the 48th Highlanders of Canada's veterans and war dead of the South African War.

== Notable interments ==
=== Business people ===
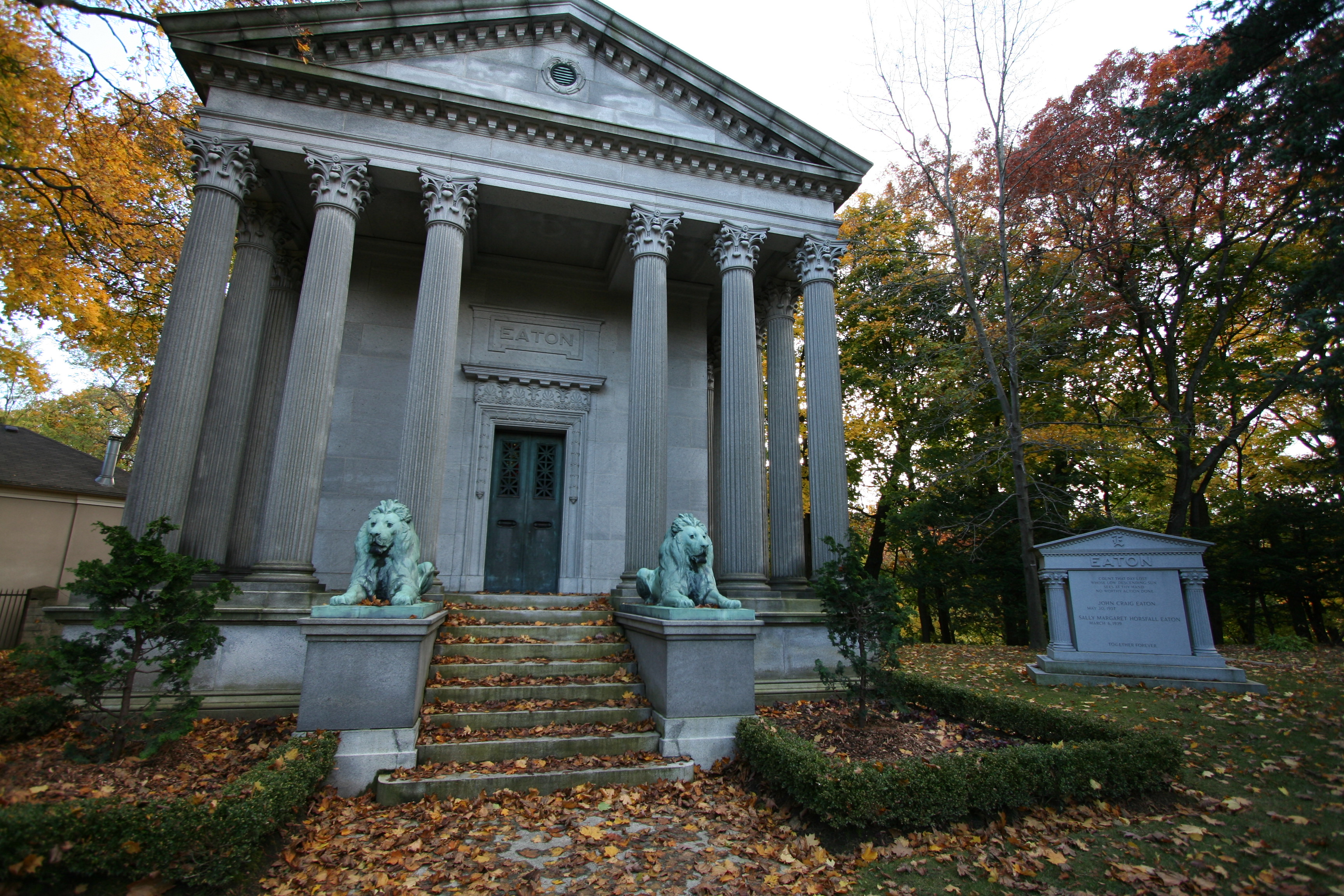
Mausoleum for Timothy Eaton, founder of Eaton's department stores.

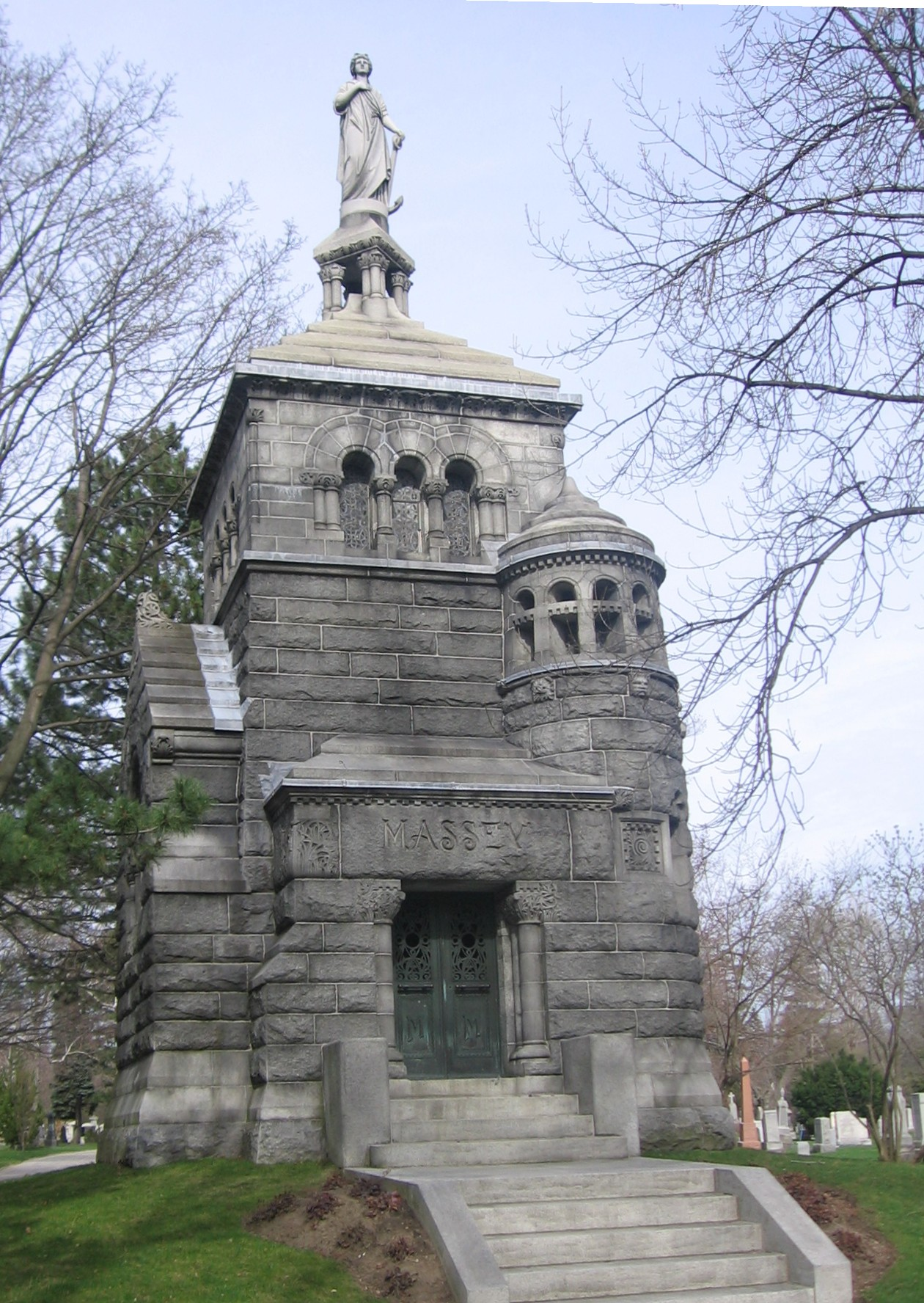
The mausoleum of Hart Massey.

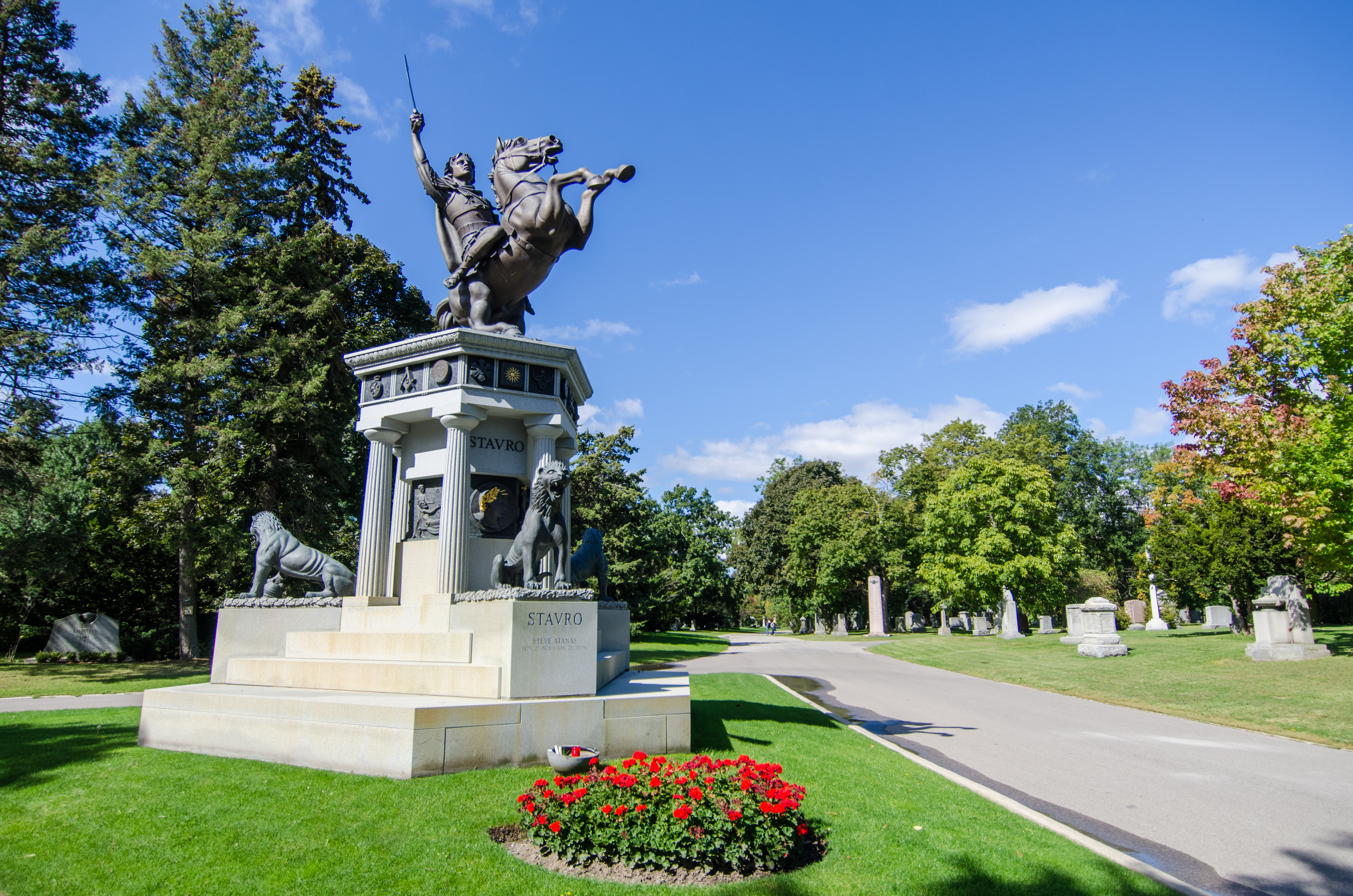
Memorial for Steve Stavro, owner of Knob Hill Stable and shareholder in Maple Leaf Gardens Ltd.

- John Paris Bickell (1884–1951), majority owner and chairman of the Toronto Maple Leafs, co-founder and chairman of Avro Canada
- Alfred J. Billes (1902–1995), co-founder of Canadian Tire
- George Montegu Black II (1911–1976), president of Canadian Breweries Limited
- Matthew James Boylen (1907–1970), mining magnate (Brunswick Mining and Smelting Corp. Ltd), racehorse owner
- William Mellis Christie (1829–1900), namesake of the Canadian "Mr. Christie" brand of cookies and biscuits
- Gordon Cheesbrough (1952–2010), businessman, president and CEO of Altamira Investment Services
- George Albertus Cox (1840–1914), founder of Central Canada Loan & Savings Company and of National Trust Company, Ontario MP and Senator
- Robert T. Davies (1849–1916), businessman, racehorse owner
- William Henry Davies (1831–1921), Canada's first meat packer, also first artificial refrigeration
- Timothy Eaton (1834–1907), department store magnate (Eaton's)
- James Henry Gundy (1880–1951), stockbroker, co-founder of Wood Gundy Inc.
- Henry R. Jackman (1900–1979), businessman and politician, father of former Lieutenant Governor Henry N.R. Jackman
- Albert Edward Kemp (1858–1929), businessman and politician
- Hart Massey (1823–1896), founder of Massey-Harris, philanthropist
- William McMaster (1811–1887), banker, statesman, founder of McMaster University and CIBC
- Ryland H. New (1888–1979), head of Hamilton & Toronto Sewer Pipe Company and founder of National Sewer Pipe Company Limited, racehorse owner
- Arthur Peuchen (1859–1929), businessman (Standard Chemical, Iron & Lumber Company of Canada), soldier, survivor of RMS Titanic
- Edward S. Rogers Sr. (1900–1939), founder of Rogers Majestic
- Joseph Rotman (1935–2015), businessman and philanthropist
- Steve Stavro (1926–2006), founder of Knob Hill Farms, horse breeder, former owner of the Toronto Maple Leafs
- Robert Simpson (1834–1897), department store magnate (Robert Simpson Limited)
- Kenneth Thomson, 2nd Baron Thomson of Fleet (1923–2006), businessman (son of founder of Thomson Corporation), art collector, richest person in Canada
- George Weston (1864–1924), founder of George Weston Limited
- W. Garfield Weston (1898–1978), businessman and British MP

=== Clergymen ===
- Arnold Brown (1913–2002), General of The Salvation Army
- James Gareth Endicott, United Church of Canada minister, President of the Canadian Peace Congress 1949–1971
- Jonathan Goforth (1859–1936), Presbyterian Missionary
- Rev. Egerton Ryerson (1803–1882), Methodist minister
- Very Rev Dr Alexander Topp (1814–1879) twice Moderator of the Presbyterian Church of Canada
- Howard P. Whidden, clergyman, professor, politician (Manitoba MP), Chancellor of McMaster University

=== Medical personalities ===
- John Gennings Curtis Adams (1839–1922), Canada's father of dental public health, first dentist of record at the Hospital for Sick Children
- Sir Frederick Banting (1891–1941) & Charles Best (1899–1978), co-discoverers of insulin. Banting, a Major in the Royal Canadian Army Medical Corps at his death, is one of 231 Commonwealth war graves in the cemetery.
- Charles Rea Dickson (1858–1938), radiologist, electrotherapist, co-founder of CNIB Foundation
- Bertha Harmer (1880–1934), prominent Canadian/American nurse
- Jennie Smillie Robertson (1878–1981), Canada's first female surgeon

=== Music personalities ===
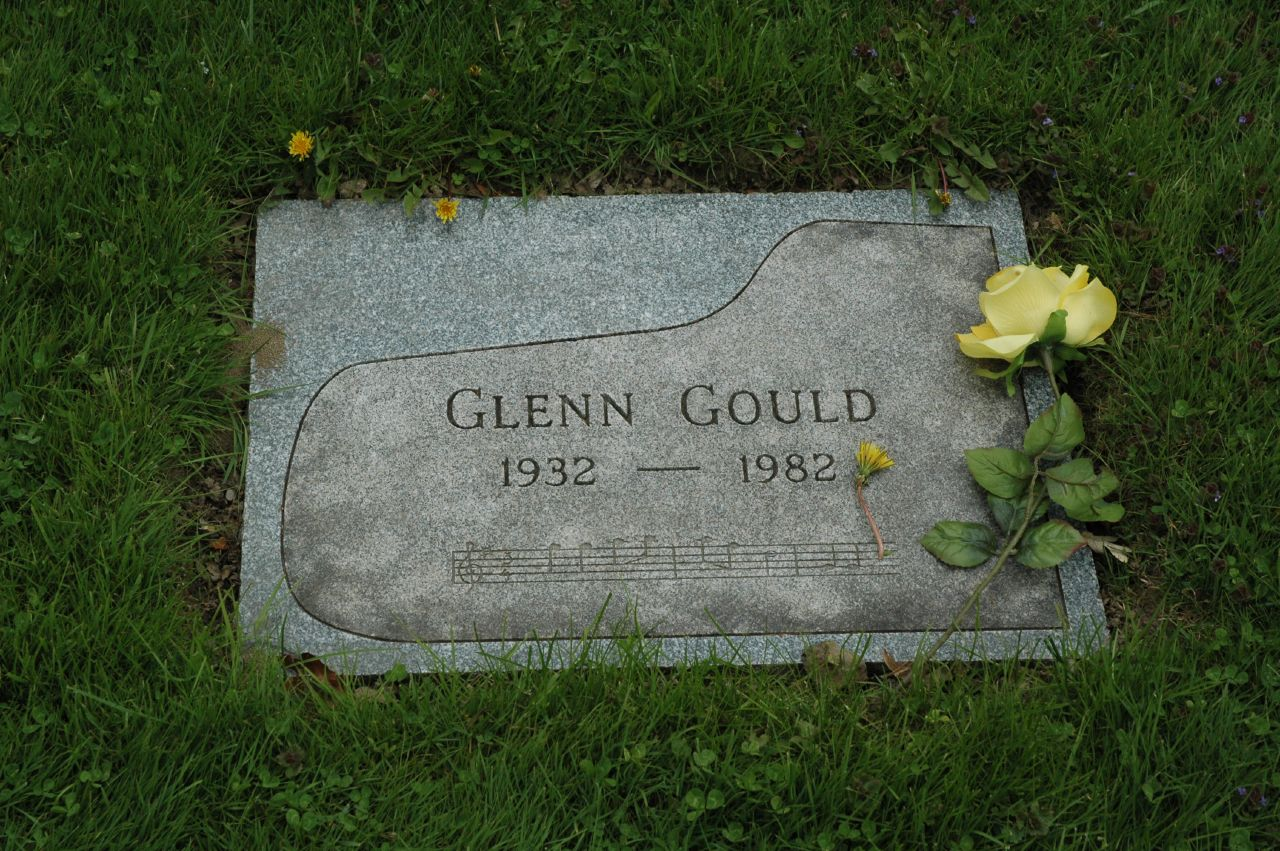
Grave marker for Glenn Gould, a classical pianist.

- Mario Bernardi (1930–2013), pianist, conductor
- Bobby Gimby (1918–1998), writer of the Expo 67 theme: Ca-na-da
- Glenn Gould (1932–1982), musician, pianist, composer, musical theorist
- Lois Lilienstein (1936–2015), children's entertainer, member of Sharon, Lois & Bram
- Robert (Bob) McBride (1946–1998) singer-songwriter and lead singer of the rock band Lighthouse
- Alexander Muir (1830–1906), author of The Maple Leaf Forever (1867), Canada's early (unofficial) national anthem
- John Rutsey (1953–2008), original drummer for progressive rock band Rush
- Robert Watkin-Mills (1849–1930), concert and oratorio singer

=== Politicians ===
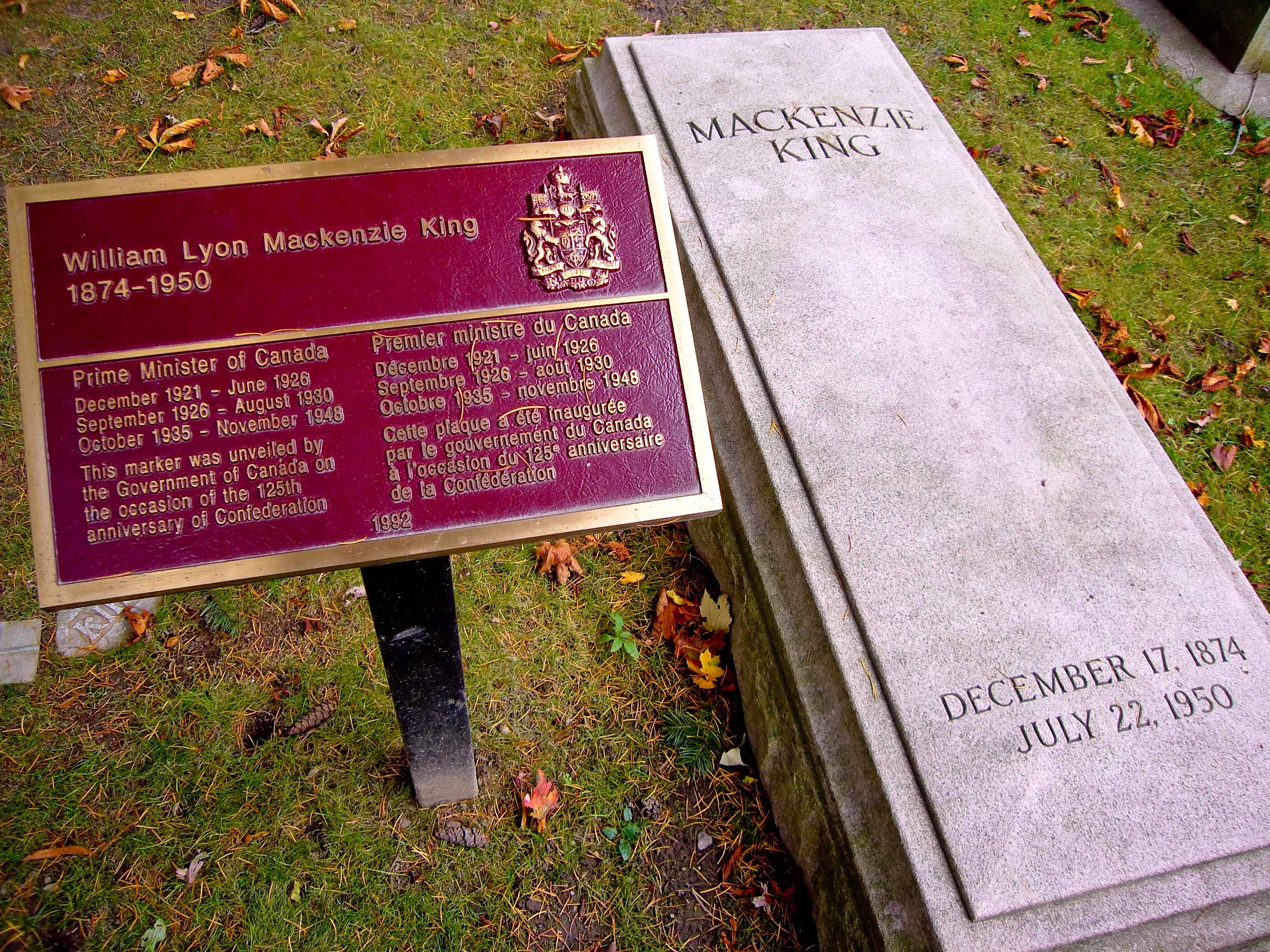
Grave of William Lyon Mackenzie King, 10th Prime Minister of Canada.

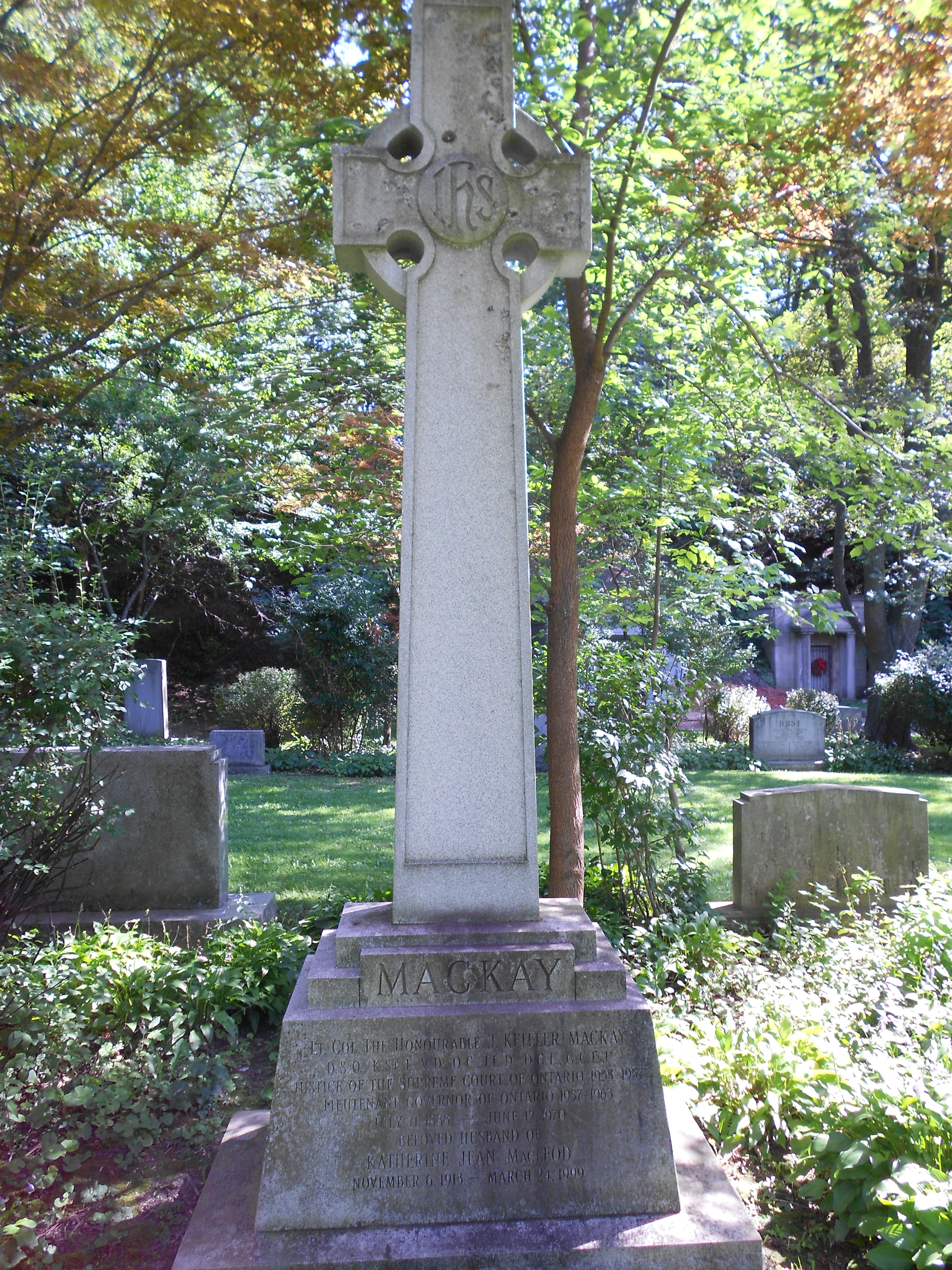
Monument of John Keiller MacKay, 19th Lieutenant Governor of Ontario.

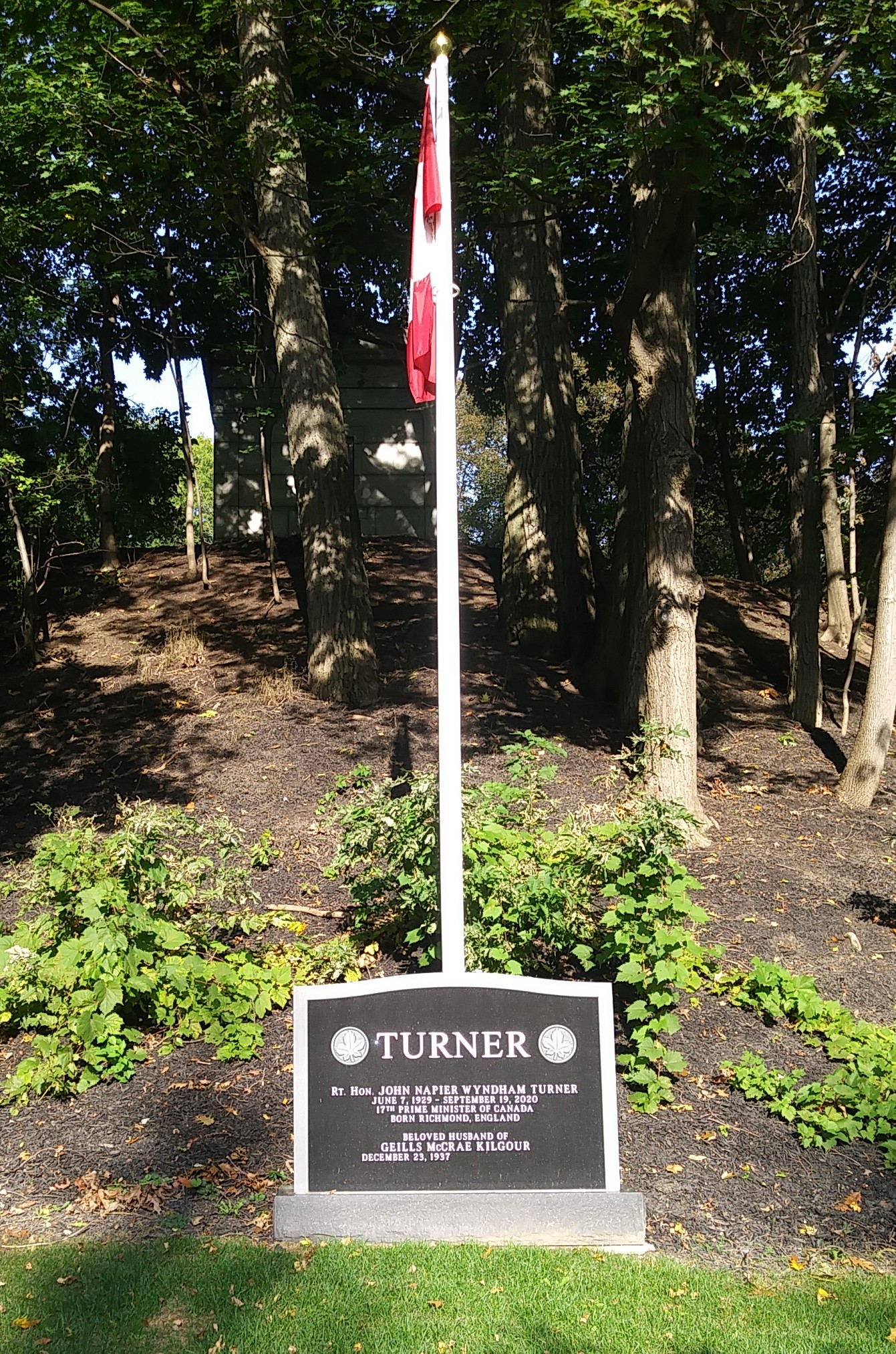
The headstone for John Turner, 17th Prime Minister of Canada.

- James Cox Aikins (1823–1904), politician (Canada West MLA, Ontario Senator, federal cabinet minister), 4th Lieutenant Governor of Manitoba
- John Black Aird (1923–1995), 23rd Lieutenant Governor of Ontario, Ontario Senator, lawyer
- Herbert Henry Ball (1863–1943), politician (Toronto alderman, Ontario MPP and cabinet minister), civil servant (King's Printer of Ontario)
- Herbert Alexander Bruce (1868–1963), 15th Lieutenant Governor of Ontario, Ontario MP, surgeon
- William Clark (1836–1915), 9th Lieutenant Governor of Ontario, lawyer
- Lionel Herbert Clarke (1859–1921), 12th Lieutenant Governor of Ontario, brewer
- William Dennison (1905–1981), 55th Mayor of Toronto, alderman, Controller, Ontario MPP, educator
- George Howard Ferguson (1870–1946), 9th Premier of Ontario, Ontario MPP and cabinet minister, diplomat
- Robert John Fleming (1854–1925), businessman, 27th Mayor of Toronto, alderman
- Fred Gardiner (1895–1983), politician (Last reeve of Forest Hill, 1st Metro Toronto Chairman)
- Stanley Grizzle (1918–2016), civil servant, citizenship judge, politician, and civil rights activist
- William Hearst (1864–1941), 7th Premier of Ontario, Ontario MPP and cabinet minister
- George Stewart Henry (1871–1958), 10th Premier of Ontario, Ontario MPP and cabinet minister
- Warring Kennedy (1827–1904), businessman, 28th Mayor of Toronto, alderman
- Allan Lamport (1903–1999), Toronto Transit Commission Commissioner, 50th Mayor of Toronto, Controller and alderman
- William Lyon Mackenzie King (1874–1950), Ontario MP and cabinet minister, 10th Prime Minister of Canada
- John Keiller MacKay (1888–1970), 19th Lieutenant Governor of Ontario, lawyer, judge
- Albert Edward Matthews (1873–1949), 16th Lieutenant Governor of Ontario, broker
- Samuel McBride (1866–1936), 41st Mayor of Toronto and alderman, lumber merchant
- Oliver Mowat (1820–1903), Canada West MLA and cabinet minister, Ontario MPP, cabinet minister and 3rd Premier of Ontario, Ontario Senator and federal cabinet minister, Father of Confederation
- David Onley (1950–2023), 28th Lieutenant Governor of Ontario, writer, journalist
- John Rolph (1793–1870), physician, lawyer and political figure in Upper Canada/Canada West (MLA and cabinet minister), Toronto alderman
- George William Ross (1841–1914), 5th Premier of Ontario, Ontario MP, MPP and provincial cabinet minister, Ontario Senator
- Egerton Ryerson (1803–1882), Methodist minister, educator, politician (Chief Superintendent of Education for Upper Canada), and public education advocate
- Robert Hood Saunders (1903–1955), lawyer, 48th Mayor of Toronto, alderman and Controller
- Sir Clifford Sifton (1861–1929), politician (Manitoba MLA, Ontario MP, federal Minister of the Interior)
- Donald Dean Summerville (1915–1963), 53rd Mayor of Toronto and Toronto alderman
- William Summerville (1879–1958), alderman, Member of Toronto Board of Control, Ontario MPP
- John Turner (1929–2020), lawyer, cabinet minister, 17th Prime Minister of Canada
- Thomas Urquhart (1858–1931), lawyer, alderman, 32nd Mayor of Toronto

=== Sports personalities ===
- Billy Burch (1900–1950), Hall of Fame ice hockey player
- Charlie Conacher (1909–1967), Hall of Fame ice hockey player (NHL) and coach of the Oshawa Generals. Buried Section 41, Lot 351
- Pete Conacher (1932–2024), Professional ice hockey player
- George Imlach (1918–1987), hockey player, NHL general manager and head coach
- Dick Irvin (1892–1957), Hall of Fame ice-hockey player and coach
- George Knudson (1937–1989), PGA Tour golfer
- Igor Korolev (1970–2011), Russian born NHL and KHL hockey player, KHL coach
- George Seymour Lyon (1858–1938), Olympic Gold Medal golfer
- Rafael Polinario (1959–2017), swimmer and Paralympic coach
- Bill Zock (1918–1988), Hall of Fame CFL football player

=== Survivors of the Titanic ===
- Lieutenant-Colonel Arthur Peuchen (1859–1929) was a Canadian businessman and RMS Titanic survivor. He was also a World War I veteran.
- Ethel Flora Fortune (1883–1961) was a first-class passenger and survivor of RMS Titanic.

=== Veterans ===
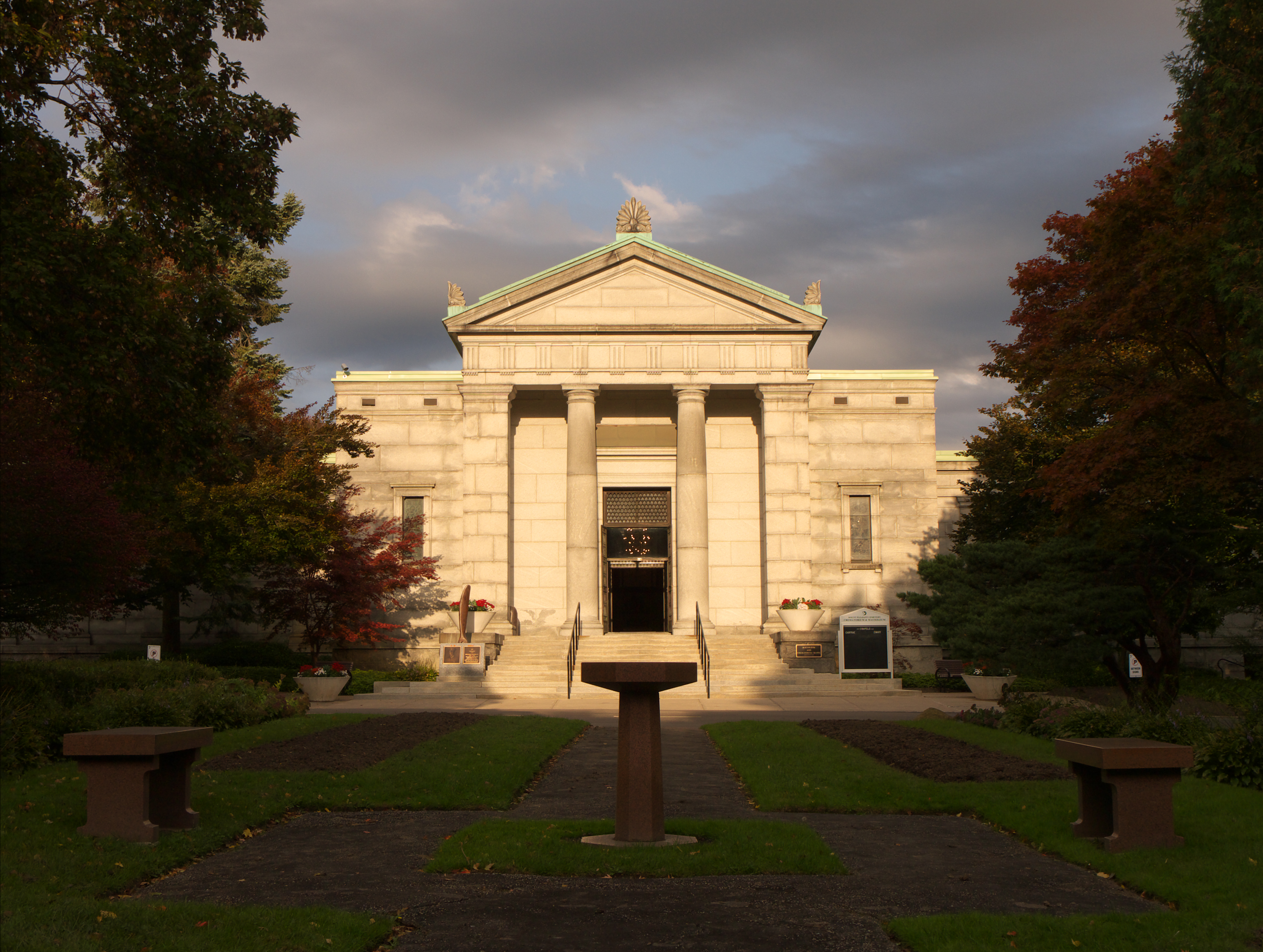
The tomb of World War I flying ace William George Barker is in the cemetery's main mausoleum.

- Curley Christian (1882–1954), World War I veteran.
- William George 'Billy' Barker, VC, DSO & Bar, MC & Two Bars (1894–1930), LCOL, 201 Squadron, RAF. World War I flying ace and Victoria Cross recipient.
- George Fraser Kerr, VC, MC & Bar, MM (1895–1929), CAPT, 3rd battalion (Toronto) Central Ontario Regiment, CEF. World War I Victoria Cross recipient.
- Guy Simonds (1903–1974), senior officer of the Canadian Army in World War II, known as the 'Liberator of Holland'.

=== Other ===
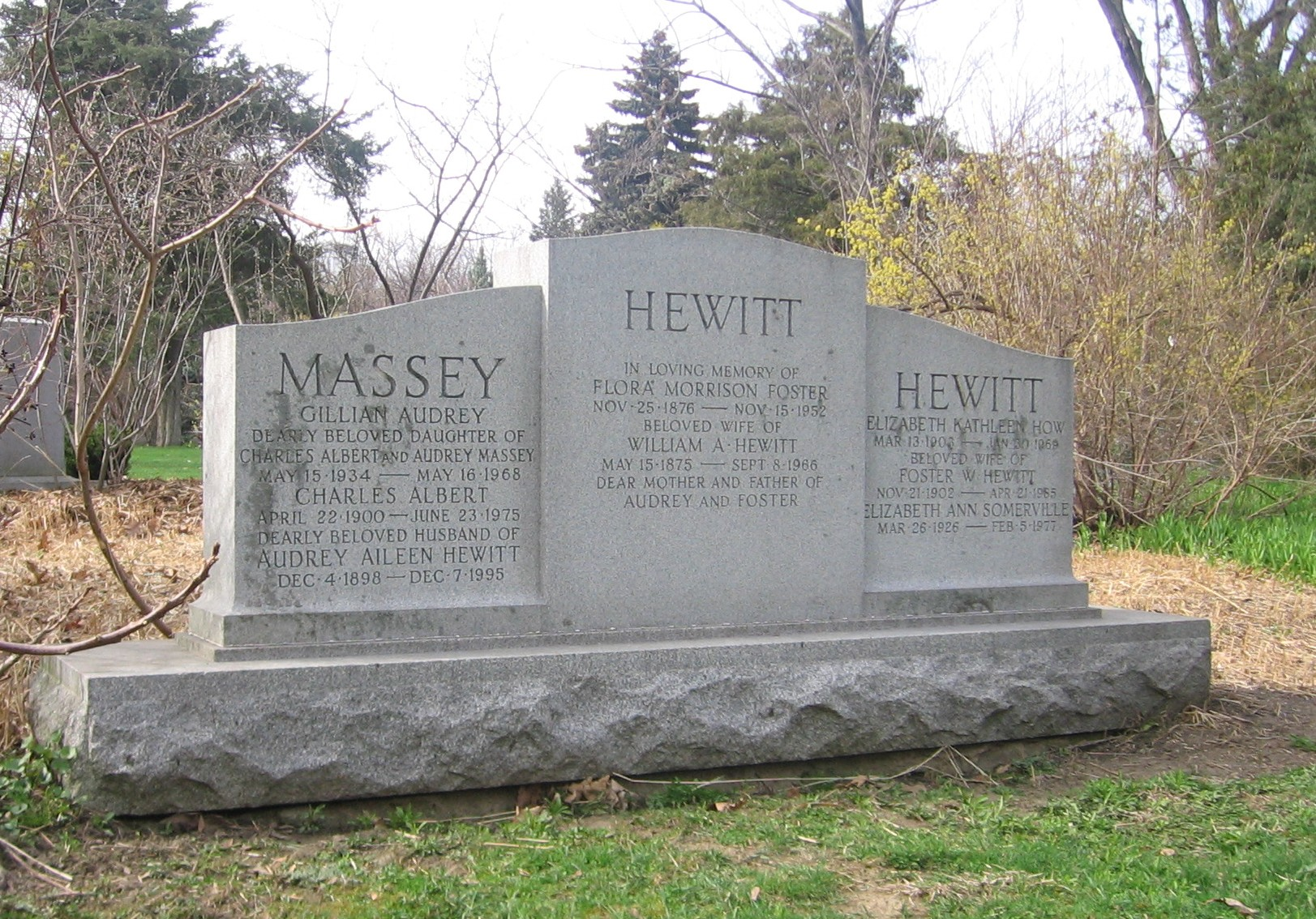
Grave stone for the Hewitt family, which features W. A. Hewitt and his son, Foster Hewitt.

- James Bain (1842–1908), first chief librarian of the Toronto Public Library
- Victor Child (1897–1960), painter, etcher and illustrator at the Toronto Telegram
- Greg Clark, OC OBE MC (1892–1977), Canadian war veteran, journalist, and humorist.
- Fred Davis (1921–1996), popular television and radio host
- Jack Dennett (1916–1975) was a Canadian radio and television announcer.
- Northrop Frye (1912–1991), educator, literary critic
- Edward Greenspan (1944–2014), famed defence lawyer
- Barbara Hamilton (1926–1996), actress
- Theodor August Heintzman (1817–1899) created Heintzman pianos
- Foster Hewitt (1902–1985), television and radio (hockey) broadcaster
- W. A. Hewitt (1875–1966), sports executive, journalist, manager at Maple Leaf Gardens
- Laura Muntz Lyall (1860–1930), impressionist painter
- David Milne (1882–1953), impressionist painter
- F. W. Micklethwaite (1849–1925), prominent photographer
- Alison Parrott (1974–1986), a murdered 11-year-old
- John A. Pearson, architect from the firm Pearson and Darling
- McKenzie Porter (1911–2006), journalist and columnist
- Rudolf Reder (1881-1977), one of only two survivors of the Bełżec extermination camp.
- Robert Sutherland (c. 1830–1878), Canada's first black lawyer, and an important benefactor and alumnus of Queen's University
- W. Stewart Wallace (1884–1970), historian, librarian, and editor
- Peter Worthington (1927–2013), journalist
- Cecilia Zhang (1994–2003), murder victim
