= Arbor Memorial =

Canadian funeral and cemetery services company

Arbor Memorial Inc.
- Type: Private
- Industry: Funeral services
- Founded: 1947
- Founder: Daniel Scanlan
- Headquarters: Toronto, Ontario, Canada
- Area served: Canada
- Services: Funeral homes, cemeteries, cremation services

Arbor Memorial Inc. is a privately held Canadian company operating funeral homes, cemeteries and crematoria. Founded in 1947, it is headquartered in Toronto, Ontario, and has operations in eight Canadian provinces. It has been described as Canada's largest provider of funeral and cemetery services.

== History ==
Arbor Memorial was founded in 1947 by Daniel Scanlan, who established Forest Lawn Memorial Gardens in London, Ontario.

The company developed additional park cemeteries during the 1950s, 1960s and 1970s and expanded into funeral home operations in the 1980s. It was previously known as Canadian Memorial Services Limited.

In September 2012, an investor group led by Scanfield Holdings Ltd., Fairfax Financial Holdings Limited and JC Clark Ltd. agreed to acquire Arbor Memorial in a transaction valued at approximately $375 million. Shareholders approved the transaction in November. The acquisition was completed later that month, and the company was taken private and delisted from the Toronto Stock Exchange.

In 2017, an investigation by CBC's Marketplace and the Toronto Star reported high markups, unclear charges and aggressive sales practices at Arbor funeral homes. Following changes to Ontario's funeral sales regulations, a 2018 CBC investigation reported that Arbor representatives continued to use sales practices that appeared to circumvent the new requirements.

== Operations ==
Arbor Memorial operates funeral homes, cemeteries, crematoria and reception centres. Its services include funeral arrangements, burial, cremation and the sale of cemetery interment rights and memorial products.

As of the reporting cited in 2026, the company operated approximately 92 funeral homes, 41 cemeteries and 27 crematoria at more than 140 locations in eight provinces.

== Properties ==
The following are properties identified as being operated by Arbor Memorial.

Property	City	Province	Year established	Funeral home	Cemetery
Ontario
Forest Lawn Memorial Gardens	London	Ontario	1947	No	Yes
Glendale Funeral Home & Cemetery	Toronto	Ontario	1952	Yes	Yes
Highland Memory Gardens	Toronto	Ontario	1953	No	Yes
Resthaven Memorial Gardens	Toronto	Ontario	1925	No	Yes
Pine Ridge Memorial Gardens	Ajax	Ontario		No	Yes
Mount Lawn Funeral Home & Cemetery	Whitby	Ontario		Yes	Yes
Glenview Memorial Gardens	Vaughan	Ontario		No	Yes
Brampton Funeral Home & Cemetery	Brampton	Ontario	1950s	Yes	Yes
Glen Oaks Funeral Home & Cemetery	Oakville	Ontario		Yes	Yes
Highland Hills Funeral Home & Cemetery	Markham	Ontario	1999	Yes	Yes
Kelly Funeral Home – Somerset Chapel	Ottawa	Ontario		Yes	No
Kelly Funeral Home – Walkley Chapel	Ottawa	Ontario		Yes	No
Kelly Funeral Home – Barrhaven Chapel	Ottawa	Ontario		Yes	No
Capital Funeral Home & Cemetery	Ottawa	Ontario		Yes	Yes
McKenzie & Blundy Funeral Home & Cremation Centre	Sarnia	Ontario	1885	Yes	No
Harbourview Funeral Centre	Thunder Bay	Ontario		Yes	No
Memory Gardens Funeral Home & Cemetery	Breslau	Ontario		Yes	Yes
Victoria Lawn Cemetery	St. Catharines	Ontario	1856	No	Yes
Manitoba
Chapel Lawn Funeral Home & Cemetery	Winnipeg	Manitoba		Yes	Yes
Glenlawn Funeral Home & Cemetery	Winnipeg	Manitoba		Yes	Yes
Glen Eden Funeral Home & Cemetery	Winnipeg	Manitoba		Yes	Yes
Alberta
Mountain View Funeral Home & Cemetery	Calgary	Alberta		Yes	Yes
Eden Brook Funeral Home & Cemetery	Calgary	Alberta		Yes	Yes
Evergreen Funeral Home & Cemetery	Edmonton	Alberta		Yes	Yes
Westlawn Funeral Home & Cemetery	Edmonton	Alberta		Yes	Yes
Glenwood Funeral Home & Cemetery	Sherwood Park	Alberta		Yes	Yes
Saskatchewan
Regina Funeral Home & Cemetery	Regina	Saskatchewan		Yes	Yes
British Columbia
Valley View Funeral Home & Cemetery	Surrey	British Columbia		Yes	Yes
First Memorial Funeral Services	Vancouver	British Columbia		Yes	No
First Memorial Funeral Services – Riverview Chapel	Vancouver	British Columbia		Yes	No
First Memorial Funeral Services – Burkeview Chapel	Port Coquitlam	British Columbia		Yes	No
Sands Funeral Chapel	Victoria	British Columbia		Yes	No
Sands Funeral Chapel	Duncan	British Columbia		Yes	No
Sands Funeral Chapel	Nanaimo	British Columbia		Yes	No
Royal Oak Burial Park	Victoria	British Columbia		No	Yes
New Brunswick
Fair Haven Funeral Home & Cemetery	Moncton	New Brunswick		Yes	Yes
Fair Haven Memorial Gardens	Moncton	New Brunswick		No	Yes

== See also ==
- Mount Pleasant Group
- Park Lawn Corporation
- Fairfax Financial
