= Mount Pleasant Group of Cemeteries =

Canadian non-profit cemetery operator

- Formation: 1855; 171 years ago
- Type: Non-profit statutory public trust
- Location: Toronto, Canada
- Region served: Greater Toronto Area
- Services: Cemeteries, funeral centres, crematoria and mausoleums
- Website: www.mountpleasantgroup.com
- Formerly called: Toronto General Burying Grounds Trust, Toronto Trust Cemeteries, Commemorative Services of Ontario

The Mount Pleasant Group of Cemeteries is a non-profit statutory public trust that operates cemeteries, funeral centres, crematoria and mausoleums in the Greater Toronto Area. Established in 1855 as the Toronto General Burying Grounds Trust, it was subsequently known as Toronto Trust Cemeteries and Commemorative Services of Ontario before adopting its present name in 1998.

The group operates 10 cemeteries, nine funeral centres, four crematoria and 14 mausoleums. By 2023, it held approximately 1,400 acres (570 ha) of land and assets valued at nearly $1.3 billion, including a $581-million perpetual care fund for cemetery maintenance.

== History ==
In the early 19th century, burial grounds in York were generally restricted to members of the Church of England or the Roman Catholic Church. Residents who belonged to neither denomination had to seek burial outside the town.

Following a petition to the Legislative Council of Upper Canada for a non-sectarian burial ground, legislation authorizing the establishment of a general cemetery received royal assent in 1826. Three hundred residents contributed one dollar each towards the purchase of land near present-day Bloor Street and Yorkville. The cemetery became known as Potter's Field or the Strangers' Burying Ground.

As Yorkville expanded, residents petitioned for the cemetery's closure. In 1855, the Legislative Assembly of the Province of Canada established the Toronto General Burying Grounds Trust to close Potter's Field and arrange for the relocation of the graves. Most of the remains were transferred to the Toronto Necropolis, which had opened in 1850 on the west bank of the Don River. They were reinterred in a section called the "Resting Place of the Pioneers".

In 1873, the Trust purchased 200 acres (81 ha) east of Yonge Street in the Township of York. Mount Pleasant Cemetery opened on the site in 1876. The remaining graves and markers from Potter's Field were subsequently transferred there.

The Trust acquired additional cemetery properties in Toronto and surrounding municipalities during the 20th century.

Until the 1990s, Ontario legislation prohibited cemetery operators from operating funeral homes. Following changes to the law, the Trust established Canadian Memorial Services as a funeral services subsidiary. It operates funeral centres at Mount Pleasant Group cemeteries and three off-cemetery funeral chapels under the name "The Simple Alternative", located in Mississauga, Toronto and Pickering.

== Legal status and disputes ==
The Mount Pleasant Group's legal status and governance have been the subject of litigation concerning its obligations as a public trust. Critics questioned its financial disclosure practices and the extent of public oversight of its operations.

In 2013, Friends of Toronto Public Cemeteries, a residents' organization, brought proceedings in the Ontario Superior Court of Justice seeking recognition of the group's public trust obligations, public election of trustees and government supervision. Private funeral home operators also participated in the proceedings, alleging that the group had used its legal status to gain an unfair advantage in the funeral services industry.

In 2018, Justice Sean Dunphy ruled that the statutory trust established in 1826 remained in effect. He ordered that the group's seven directors be designated as trustees and that a public meeting be held to confirm or replace them. The court also found that the group had exceeded its authority under the trust by operating funeral homes and visitation centres.

The Mount Pleasant Group appealed. In 2020, the Court of Appeal for Ontario overturned substantial portions of the lower court's decision. The Supreme Court of Canada declined to hear a further appeal. Friends of Toronto Public Cemeteries subsequently indicated that it would seek changes through legislation.

== Cemeteries ==
The following table lists cemeteries operated by the Mount Pleasant Group, including the former Potter's Field.

Cemetery	Location	Municipality	Established	Interments	Facilities and notes	Image	Reference
Beechwood Cemetery	Concord, Vaughan	York Region	1965		Cremation interment, scattering grounds and mausoleum		
Duffin Meadows Cemetery	Pickering	Durham Region	1993		Cremation interment, scattering grounds and natural burial		
Elgin Mills Cemetery	Richmond Hill	York Region	1979		Funeral reception centre, crematorium and mausoleum		
Meadowvale Cemetery	Brampton	Peel Region	1981		Funeral reception centre, crematorium, natural burial and pet burial sections		
Mount Pleasant Cemetery	Moore Park and Leaside	Toronto	1876	168,000	Funeral reception centre and crematorium		
Pine Hills Cemetery	Scarborough Junction	Toronto	1928		Funeral reception centre, cremation interment and mausoleum		
Potter's Field	Yorkville	Toronto	1825–1855		Former burial ground; most remains transferred to the Toronto Necropolis		
Prospect Cemetery	Earlscourt and Fairbank	Toronto	1890		Cremation interment and mausoleum		
Thornton Cemetery	Oshawa	Durham Region	1984		Funeral reception centre, crematorium, mausoleum and pet burial section		
Toronto Necropolis	Cabbagetown	Toronto	1850	50,000+	Crematorium and cremation interment		
York Cemetery	Willowdale, North York	Toronto	1948		Funeral reception centre and cremation interment		
