= Toronto District School Board =

Public school system of Toronto, Ontario

Toronto District School Board formerly known as Metropolitan Toronto School Board

Location
- 5050 Yonge Street; North York, Toronto, Ontario, M2N 5N8 Toronto, Ontario, M2N 5N8; Canada

District information
- Grades: JK-12
- Established: January 20, 1953 (MTSB) January 1, 1998 (current form)
- Chief Executive Officer: Camillo Cipriano
- Chair of the board: Vacant
- Schools: 469 elementary schools 110 secondary schools 5 adult education schools
- Budget: ~CA$3.7 billion (2023–2024)
- District ID: B66052

Students and staff
- Students: 236,110 (2023-24 projected)
- Teachers: 15,134 (2023-24 projected)
- Staff: 5,108 (2023-24 projected)

Other information
- Elected trustees: 12
- Student Trustees: Angelika Bell and Jenny Xing
- Indigenous Student Trustee: Derian Westra
- Website: tdsb.on.ca

The Toronto District School Board (TDSB) is the English-language public-secular school board for Toronto, Ontario, Canada. The minority public-secular francophone (Conseil scolaire Viamonde), public-separate anglophone (Toronto Catholic District School Board), and public-separate francophone (Conseil scolaire catholique MonAvenir) communities of Toronto also have their own publicly funded school boards and schools that operate in the same area, but which are independent of the TDSB. Its headquarters are in the district of North York.

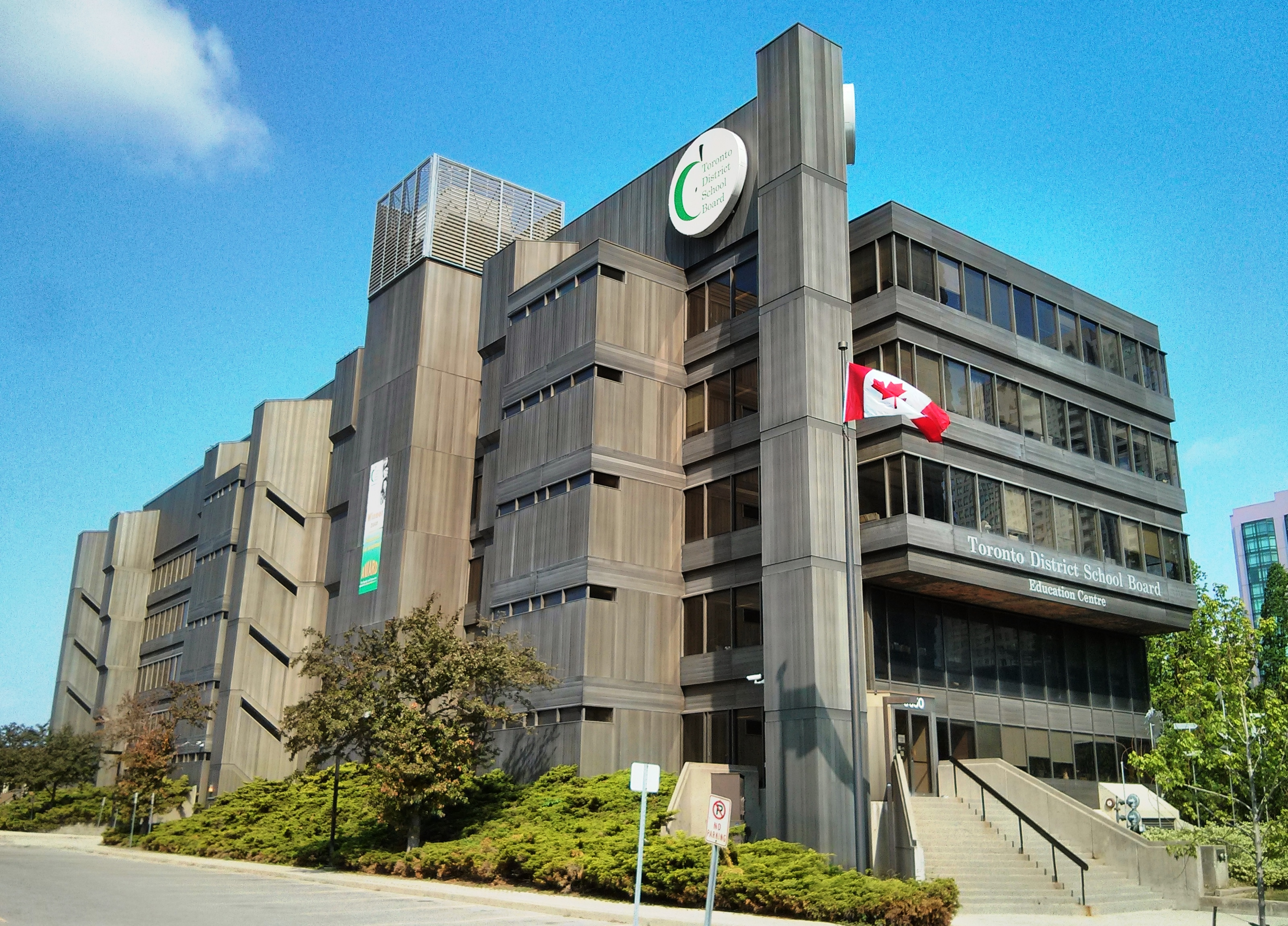
The Toronto District School Board Education Centre, located at 5050 Yonge Street in North York, is the headquarters of the Toronto District School Board, formerly the headquarters of the North York Board of Education.

The TDSB was founded on January 20, 1953, as the Metropolitan Toronto School Board to be a "super-ordinate umbrella board" to coordinate activities and to apportion tax revenues equitably across the six anglophone and later a francophone school boards within Metro Toronto. The MTSB was reorganized and replaced on January 1, 1998, when the six anglophone metro school boards and MTSB merged to form the Toronto District School Board. The francophone school board of MTSB was amalgamated with several other Francophone school boards in the region to form Conseil scolaire Viamonde.

Today, the TDSB is Canada's largest school board and the fourth largest school board in North America.

== History ==
=== Early history ===
The earliest schools in Toronto were in private homes, often run by members of the Anglican clergy. Public funding for schools began with the establishment of the Home District Grammar School. Notably, it was not governed by an elected school board. Voting for the city's first elected school board took place in 1816 following the passage of the Common School Act. The board, as per the regulations of the act, had three members: Eli Playter, Thomas David Morrison, and Jesse Ketchum. The board governed the Common School at York which was located on the same grounds as the Grammar School. However, this lasted only four years before the school and its associated school board were shut down in favour of the creation of the Central School which was placed under the control of an unelected board and marked an attempt to bring public schools under Anglican religious control. Control of this board in Toronto was then subsumed under a provincial board of education in 1824, itself merged into the Council of King's College, a body charged with obtaining a university for the province.

In 1831, Upper Canada College was created to replace the Home District Grammar School with state funding in the form of an initial crown lands grant of 6,000 acres, later supplemented by an additional 60,000 acres. In contrast, common schools in this era, the equivalent of today's elementary schools, were woefully underfunded. Funding for the schools was derived from the sale of crown lands, but the lands chosen to support education were undesirable and could not command a high enough price to sustain the common schools. In addition to undesirability, the acreage devoted to funding the common schools initially granted in 1816 was later reduced by half. These deficiencies began to be addressed by the School Act of 1844 and culminated in the creation of local public school boards across the province including the Toronto Public School Board.

=== The Toronto Public School Board ===
The Toronto Public School Board (TPSB) was created in 1847 to oversee elementary education in Toronto. However, the date of creation of the board is also given as 1850 as this was when trustee elections under a ward system started. Legislation toward the creation of local, public school boards began with the School Act of 1844, which stipulated municipal contributions toward the salaries of teachers. The Toronto Public School Board continued to govern the city's elementary schools until 1904 when, following a city referendum, it was merged with the Collegiate Institute Board, which oversaw the city's secondary schools, and the Technical School Board, which oversaw the Toronto Technical School, to form the Toronto Board of Education.

Six trustees were appointed to the original 1847 board by the municipal council of Toronto to serve with the mayor. The board was composed entirely of white men until the election of the first female trustee Augusta Stowe-Gullen in 1892. The board was created after the passage of the Common School Act of 1846 spearheaded by Egerton Ryerson, architect of both publicly funded schooling and the residential school system. The Act also called for the creation of a provincial normal school which would become the Toronto Normal School. Prior to the 1846 Common School Act, individual schools were governed by boards created under the Grammar School Act of 1807 and the Common Schools Act of 1816. Like all boards of education at the time, the Toronto Public School Board was responsible for raising money to fund schools in addition to grants provided by the provincial government. However, they were not empowered to make these levies compulsory until the passage of the Common School Act in 1850 brought on in part by the closure of schools in Toronto in 1848 due to lack of funds. This act also allowed for the creation of separate schools boards in Ontario including racially segregated schools. In Toronto, the act allowed for the creation of a Catholic school board which would eventually become today's Toronto Catholic District School Board. While elementary schooling across the province was not made free by law until 1871, the 1850 Common School Act allowed for individual boards to entirely fund their schools through public funds. The Toronto Public School Board voted to do so in 1851, making elementary schooling in the city free. Minutes from the first meetings of the Toronto Public School Board have been preserved by the Toronto District School Board Museum and Archives.

==== Schools ====
When the Toronto Public School Board was created, elementary or common schools in the city did not have dedicated buildings but instead, "the thousand-odd children who were registered as common school pupils were accommodated in rented premises--a dozen or so small halls and houses, designated by numbers." This changed shortly after the election of the first board when six schools identical in architecture were built, one in each ward of the city. More schools were built over the coming decades. Some of these original schools are listed in the order of their construction below:

- Louisa St. School (1852)
- The Park School (1853)
- George St. School (1853)
- John St. School (1855)
- Victoria St. School (1855)
- Phoebe St. School (1855)
- Jesse Ketchum School (1858)
- Givins St. School (1859)
- Elizabeth St. School (1868)
- York St. School (1870)
- Bathurst St. School (1872)
- Church St. School (1872)
- Parliament St. School (1872)

The six original schools have since been demolished with only the Park School having been replaced with a new school. As the student population grew, rented premises continued to be used to accommodate students, especially in the case of auxiliary schools where attendance was lower and the schools were more similar to county schools.

==== Board members ====
The first elections for the school board were held on September 3, 1850. Two trustees were elected to represent each of the six wards in the city.

Results of 1850 School Trustee Elections
Ward	Trustees
St. Andrew's	G.P. Ridout; Alex. Macdonald
St. David's	Jos. Workman, M.D.; A.A. Riddell
St. George's	J.L. Robinson; E.F. Whittemore
St. James's	J.D. Ridout; D. Paterson
St. Lawrence's	J.G. Beard; Wm. Gooderham
St. Patrick's	J.H. Hagarty; James Price

This list includes many prominent families of Toronto. Positions on the board were unpaid and were dominated by members of wealthy families who could afford to spend time in meetings and advocating for board policies. J.D. Ridout and G.P. Ridout were sons of Thomas Ridout, a politician and chairman of the Home District Council. The Gooderham name is known best for its connection to Gooderham and Worts a Canadian distillery since purchased by Hiram Walker and whose buildings have been retained and restored in Toronto's Distillery District. Joshua George Beard served on the board for twenty years in addition to serving as a city alderman and was elected the 10th Mayor of Toronto in 1854. Gooderham, David Paterson, and E.F. Whittemore were directors of Consumer's Gas Works a Toronto gas distribution company since acquired by Enbridge whose buildings remain prominent in Toronto including the Consumer's Gas Building and as performance and rehearsal spaces for Canadian Stage. James L. Robinson was George W. Allan's partner in law and son of Sir John Robinson, 1st Baronet of Toronto. John Hawkins Hagarty would go on to become Chief Justice of Ontario.

James Price was a builder; his presence as the only trustee from more humble roots speaks to the composition of the Toronto Public School Board in this era. Joseph Workman was elected chair of the school board. In addition to serving on the board for five years, he was superintendent of the Provincial Lunatic Asylum, now the Queen Street Mental Health Centre of the Centre for Addiction and Mental Health. Workman was one of the prime supporters of the campaign to build publicly owned schools.

==== Notable figures ====
George Anthony Barber, the board's first Local Superintendent, and the father of Canadian cricket.

Rev. James Porter, the board's second Local Superintendent. He worked to increase attendance at Toronto's public schools and reported to Egerton Ryerson on the construction of a new school for the board, Elizabeth St School.

Jesse Ketchum, a supporter of schooling responsible for many donations to the board and after whom the current Toronto District School Board school, Jesse Ketchum Public School, is named.

James L. Hughes, principal of the Toronto Normal School's Model School and chief inspector for the Toronto Public School Board.

==== Characteristics of schooling ====
Schooling in the era of the Toronto Public School Board was markedly different from modern schooling. In these large urban schools, students were separated by gender but taught in large, mixed-age classes of often over 100 students. Students were taught out of readers and exams were conducted orally and only available to the best students from each school division. The technology of schooling was different as well. Students often were seated on long benches, or "forms". The introduction of the individual desk was an advance as a means of preventing students from distracting each other. Urban schools were often early adopters of these new technologies. This meant that the Toronto Public School Board was a leader in adopting blackboards, which other school boards were slower to introduce. Teachers were also often expected to lodge in the school. In the Toronto Public School Board, provisions were made for a room for the teacher in the basements of the first six schools. At this time, secondary schools, or grammar schools, were not free. However, the Toronto Public School Board provided scholarships for the top achieving boys to attend these all-male institutions. A provincial grant incentivized the creation of school libraries, and in 1858 the board had 2,837 volumes. An 1862 motion for the introduction of gymnasiums was met with some resistance as they were considered an expensive addition outside the scope of the academic disciplines of schools. Ultimately, the Select Committee voted against the recommendation.

==== TPSB Industrial Schools ====
Schooling for children living in poverty was a concern of many of the chief inspectors of the TPSB, including Inspector Hughes. He and others campaigned for the passage of legislation to allow for the creation of industrial schools, similar to those created in England. In the meantime, a class for expelled students was created in a church mission run by the Anglican Grace Church. The space was provided for free by the church and the class was staffed by the TPSB, who provided Esther Frances How who would go on to be widely remembered for her work at the school. Although the Ontario Industrial Schools Act was passed in 1874, industrial schools were not built in Toronto until 1887, when the province provided funding to support the construction of such schools. The first two industrial schools in Toronto were the Victoria Industrial School for Boys and the Alexandra School for Girls. The schools were both part of the Industrial Schools Association of Toronto.

===== Victoria Industrial School for Boys =====
Built in 1887, the Victoria Industrial School for Boys was the destination for youth convicted of crimes and "incorrigible" youth until it was closed in 1934. Boys at the school were housed in "cottages", two to three story brick buildings housing as many as forty boys and quite unlike the wood-frame houses in nearby Mimico. In the "cottages", the boys were supervised by a man and woman, usually husband and wife. However, despite the homely setting, the school was often a place of violence for the boys there including such treatment as being handcuffed to the bed, beaten, and placed on bread-and-water diets. These abuses were the focus of investigations by the province as well as reporting in the Toronto Daily Star. Although the school was operated locally, the school was increasingly populated by boys from across the province. The site was used for the education of inmates under various names including the Mimico Correctional Centre and is now home to the Toronto South Detention Centre.

===== Alexandra School for Girls =====
Opened in 1892, the Alexandra School for Girls was located to the east of the then-bounds of the City of Toronto in Scarborough to the north of the intersection of present-day Blantyre Ave and Kingston Rd. The school was opened under the leadership of Superintendent Lucy W. Brooking. The population of the school increased with a reduction in the number of young women housed at the Industrial Refuge for Girls at the Andrew Mercer Reformatory for Women. A number of factors including poverty led girls to be place at the school rather than other institutions such as the Toronto Girls' Home.

=== The Toronto Collegiate Institute Board ===
The Collegiate Institute Board was created in 1807 to oversee what is presently called secondary schools. Unlike the Toronto Public School Board whose trustees were elected, the Collegiate Institute Board was appointed. In its earliest years, Bishop Strachan influenced appointments, but starting in 1841 trustees were appointed by the provincial executive government and my municipal council from 1853 to 1904. Dean H.J. Grasset is most associated with the board, having served on the board for ten years. Until the late 1880s the board was only responsible for one school, but this changed with the annexation of Parkdale in 1889, leading the Parkdale High School to be renamed the Jameson Avenue Collegiate Institute, and the construction of Harbord Collegiate Institute in 1892. The addition of schools meant that the Toronto High School was renamed the Jarvis Collegiate Institute in 1890, though the school did not move to its current location until 1924.

=== The Toronto Technical School Board ===
The Technical School Board was created to oversee a single school, the Toronto Technical School. Classes were first offered in 1892 in St. Lawrence Hall, but when enrolment exceeded expectations they were moved to Old Wycliffe Hall, now part of the University of Toronto campus. In 1901, classes were moved to the Stewart Building due to growing enrolment. Finally, the school moved to its current location in 1915 and is now known as the Central Technical School due to the construction of addition technical schools in the board. Members of the Technical School Board were also appointed but by a different process than members of the Collegiate Institute Board. Members of the Technical School Board were appointed by municipal council, the Architectural Guild, the Trades and Labour Council, and the Association of Stationary Engineers. After amalgamation in 1904, members of the board became part of a special committee of the Toronto Board of Education. A.C. McKay was an early champion of technical education.

=== The Toronto Board of Education ===
The Toronto Board of Education, officially the Board of Education for the City of Toronto, governed education in pre-amalgamation Toronto from 1904 to 1998. It was created from the merger of the existing boards of education in the city (The Toronto Public School Board, the Toronto Collegiate Institute Board, and the Toronto Technical School Board) following a municipal referendum in 1904. The board governed education in Toronto until 1998.

=== Metropolitan Toronto School Board and the Toronto District School Board ===
The Metropolitan Toronto School Board was established on January 20, 1953, before the 1954 creation of the Municipality of Metropolitan Toronto From the beginning, it was a federation of eleven public anglophone municipal school boards consisting of the East York Board of Education, the Etobicoke Board of Education, the Forest Hill Board of Education, the Lakeshore District Board of Education, Leaside Board of Education, the North York Board of Education, the Scarborough Board of Education, the Swansea Board of Education, the Toronto Board of Education, Weston Board of Education and the York Township Board of Education. Its head office was located at the former York Mills Public School site on Campbell Crescent (built 1956 and demolished 2004).

Throughout its existence, the MTSB assisted local boards with maintenance assistance payments but the local school boards were exempted from paying property taxes.

In 1967, Forest Hill and Swansea boards were abolished and merged with the TBE. The Lakeshore board was amalgamated with the Etobicoke school board followed by the Leaside board integrated into the East York Board, and later the Weston public board was absorbed in the York board.

French schools operated by the North York, Scarborough and Toronto boards were transferred into MTSB's francophone unit, the Conseil des écoles françaises de la communauté urbaine de Toronto (CEFCUT) on December 1, 1988. Seven of its public schools existed as of 1980. The concept of CÉFCUT was developed by a committee assembled by Ontario Minister of Education Sean Conway. CÉFCUT was established on 1 December 1988, and it began operations in 1989.

The passage of the Fewer School Boards Act, 1997, a bill passed by the Conservative Mike Harris government despite public opposition, which amalgamated boards of education across the province, reducing a number of boards to 72. The Act immediately followed legislation which amalgamated municipalities, such as Bill 103 which made changes to the City of Toronto Act to amalgamate Metro Toronto into the current City of Toronto. As a consequence, six of the English school boards merged with the MTSB to form the English-language Public District School Board No. 12 which later became the Toronto District School Board in 1999. The French language schools operated by the CEFCUT were separated and became part of the new board, French-language Public District School Board No. 58 which was later renamed to Conseil Scolaire de District du Centre-Sud-Ouest.

TDSB headquarters was located at 155 College Street, the former offices of the Toronto Board of Education. TDSB head office moved from 155 College Street to 5050 Yonge Street, which was previously occupied by the North York Board of Education.

== Organization ==
The school board's organizational mission is "to enable all students to reach high levels of achievement and to acquire the knowledge, skills, and values they need to become responsible members of a democratic society."

The TDSB is the largest school board in Canada and the 4th largest in North America. The record was previously held by the Metropolitan Separate School Board with over 100,000 students until 1998 what is now the Toronto Catholic District School Board.

There are more than 239,000 students in nearly 600 schools within the TDSB. Of these schools, 469 offer elementary education, 110 offer secondary level education, and there are five adult day schools. The TDSB has 18 alternative elementary schools as well as 20 alternative secondary schools. TDSB has 30,920 permanent and 5,230 occasional staff, which includes 11,010 elementary school teachers and 5,300 at the secondary level.

Parent and Community involvement occurs at all levels of the school board system, from parental involvement at local schools, the involvement of local organizations at the school level and formal advisory committees at the board level.

There has also been an effort to include more student involvement in the Toronto District School Board. The "Super Council" is an organization which acts as a student council for the entire board. There has also been an attempt to place student input in the TDSB's Equity Department through the second, and last, board-wide student group: Students Working Against Great Injustice. Both groups have put together various events and have had much success in giving input towards the decisions of the board.

The TDSB recruits students from outside of Canada, and attracts students from Kindergarten to Grade 12, charging international students up to $14,000 per year to study in Toronto.

=== Trustees ===
The TDSB has 12 elected trustees, two student trustees, and an Indigenous student trustee. The chair of the board is vacant. and its vice-chair is vacant. Before the 1998 split of the French schools, the MTSB had two French seats in addition to twenty-three English seats.

2026–2030 Board of Trustees
Ward	Trustee
1	Matias de Dovitiis
2	Timothy Ellis
3	Alexis Dawson
4	Brandon Choi
5	Jennifer Volk
6	Stacey Cline
7	Deborah Williams
8	Farzana Rajwani
9	Christopher Mammoliti
10	Karen Emerson
11	Ravicha Ravinthiran
12	Anu Sriskandarajah

=== Chief Executive Officer ===
The current CEO (formerly Director of Education) is Camillo Cipriano.

==== Former CEOs ====
- Stacey Zucker (2025 - 2026) - interim, later appointed as CFO and COO
- Clayton La Touche (2025) – fired by the Ontario-appointed supervisor
- Colleen Russell-Rawlings (2021-2024) – now retired
- Karen Falconer (2021–2021)
- Kathy Witherow (2020–2020) – now retired
- Carlene Jackson (2020–2020) – now Ontario's comptroller general
- John Malloy (2015–2020) – left the TDSB to work as the superintendent of the San Ramon Valley Unified School District
- Donna Quan (2013–2015) – was acting in 2013, left to work for York University (as adjunct professor) and Ministry of Education
- Chris Spence (2009–2013) – resigned due to a plagiarism scandal and teaching license revoked (2016)
- Gerry Connelly (2005–2009) – retired from TDSB and now special advisor on Education Policy for The Learning Partnership and adjunct professor at York University
- David Reid (2001–2005) – now with Ontario Institute for Studies in Education
- Marguerite Jackson (1998–2001) – now CEO of the Education Quality and Accountability Office

== Enrollment ==
The TDSB is the largest public school board in Canada and the fourth largest board in North America. The student body comprises individuals from over 200 nationalities, collectively speaking more than 100 languages. Between the 2019–20 and 2023-24 school years, elementary enrollment declined by 9,645 students, while secondary enrollment increased by 2,524 students.

TDSB Enrollment Trends (Regular Day School)
Average Daily Enrollment	2019-20	2020-21	2021-22	2022-23	2023-24 (projected)
Elementary	173,091.3	167,626.3	162,126.8	163,673.5	164,256.0
Secondary	69,329.6	68,179.6	68,719.9	70,265.4	71,853.5
Total	243,230.9	235,805.9	230,846.7	233,938.9	236109.5

== Community involvement ==
The TDSB's Parent and Caregiver Engagement Policy and Procedure describes ways to "increase and improve effective parent/guardian/caregiver engagement in the Board," including through School Councils, forums, and the Parent Involvement Advisory Committee.

Parents can design and propose new alternative schools in the TDSB, such as a Mandarin/English bilingual school or a school that relates its teachings to skateboards and street art, although these schools still follow the provincial curriculum. The process of opening an alternative school includes a 2-year review process. The alternative schools can be contained within existing buildings and can operate with existing administrators, meaning they don't cost more to operate than standard schools.

=== Collaboration with Black Lives Matter ===
In 2017, the TDSB participated in "Freedom Day" organized by Black Lives Matter, during which students and teachers would "skip a day of school in protest" of "anti-black racism in the educational system". Issues of concern were police patrols of TDSB schools, and the disproportionate number of black students being suspended and being placed into non-academic educational streams.

== Dress code and uniforms ==
In spring 2019, after not changing in nearly a decade, the TDSB updated its dress code policy. The policy allows students to wear tops exposing shoulders, backs, stomachs, midriffs, necklines, and cleavage; and bottoms exposing legs, thighs, and hips. It was revised to promote self-expression, discourage "policing of student bodies", and decrease the impact that dress codes have on disadvantaged people, such as female, racialized, gender-diverse, Indigenous, and socio-economically disadvantaged students.

Some TDSB schools have uniforms, such as Runnymede Collegiate Institute.

== Controversies and issues ==
=== Financial issues ===
In 2002, the Government of Ontario stripped all power and authority from the school board trustees because they failed to balance the board's budget. Paul Christie was appointed by the province to serve as supervisor of the Toronto District School Board, with authority for all financial and administrative functions of the board. This allowed Christie to supersede the authority of elected school trustees. The provincial government argued that the appointment was necessary, as the TDSB had not submitted a budget to the Ontario Minister of Education as legally required. Representatives of the TDSB claimed that they could not find the necessary operating expenses for the year, given provincial regulations which prohibited deficit spending. Christie balanced the TDSB's budget through a dramatic spending reduction of $90 million. Under his watch, the TDSB eliminated many secretarial positions, phased out school-community advisors, child and youth counsellors, and attendance counsellors and reduced the number of vice-principals, cut outdoor education and adult education, and re-evaluated the position of social workers in the system. Christie's staff reports were not made public, and some critics argued that there were no adequate checks or balances on his authority.

Blackstone Partners carried out a review in 2006. They submitted a 113-page report in January 2007. Blackstone Partners were "asked to determine if the facilities division had "effective governance"." The report showed "high costs of repairs, lots of workers and spotty results, and managerial "silos" that made it hard for principals to figure out whom to approach to get a job done." Blackstone Partners gave 43 recommendations in the report. The school board claims a few have been carried out and others are in the works. When surveyed about a wide range of topics, the worst result was the school board's maintenance and construction division. Eighty percent of principals didn't believe the maintenance and construction division delivered good value for the money TDSB director Chris Spence "To use a football analogy, we are trying to move the yardstick. There is no quick fix." The Toronto Star reported that in recent investigation showed little has changed since that review. A secondary school principal "raised questions about the $143 cost of installing a pencil sharpener and the $19,000 cost of installing a sign on the school's front lawn."

In 2007, again due to alleged mismanagement by the trustees, the board will try to submit a budget with a deficit of $84 million.

The school board wants $3.6 million from the Toronto Star before it releases a database. The database shows "work orders showing what taxpayers have been charged for maintenance and construction projects at local schools." In June 2012, the Toronto Star asked for "an electronic copy showing three years of work at the TDSB." The Toronto Star stated that "the request was made under the Municipal Freedom of Information and Protection of Privacy Act."

The Ontario Ministry of Education froze funding for the school board's buildings project. The ministry cited the possibility of a $10 million to $11 million cost overrun for the retrofit of Nelson Mandela Park Public School. The project was originally priced at $21.7 million. Some of the school board's trustees are "outraged". Laurel Broten, Ontario's Minister of Education, stated, "We are not happy they don't know why" when talking about the overrun. She also stated that a supervisor may be sent in.

The Maintenance and Construction Skilled Trades Council gets 0.5% on all outside contracts even though it does not perform the work. Several contractors have stated that "contractors sometimes inflate their price for school board work to pay Hazel's group." Maintenance and Construction Skilled Trades Council are unable to do all the maintenance and construction work. TDSB spokesperson Shari Schwartz-Maltz said "the dues are considered a "temporary union membership." The TDSB does not charge the trades council rent for its offices on school board property. The school board's trustees want to stop paying the fee.

Employees of the school board visited bars, bought groceries and filled the gas tanks of their cars using "public money" and while on the job.

On June 27, 2025, the school board was once again placed under supervision by Ontario's Minister of Education, Paul Calandra, stripping all powers of authority of school board trustees, which was following investigations which showed "growing deficits, depletion of reserves and ongoing mismanagement." The supervisor is Rohit Gupta.

=== Contract with Trade Council ===
A top official from the Toronto District School Board stated that he has concerns about a "controversial contract" between the Trades Council and the Ontario Government and claims that the contract with the trades council is "politically motivated". Chris Bolton, the chairman of the school board, stated that the Trade Council is a "major contributors to the Liberals" and even campaigned for the Liberals. A government spokesperson stated that Education Minister Laurel Broten decision to retain the Trade Council's services "nothing to do with politics."

Terms of the contract includes:

- "The TDSB will not be allowed to hire outside workers for some jobs." The school board won't be allowed to hire outside workers even if it would cost taxpayers less.
- "The trades council is still allowed to choose all new workers for the publicly funded school board." The Toronto District School Board, who pays the workers, doesn't have a say on who is hired.
- A structured shift system will be preserved where the morning and afternoon shifts overlaps. This requires the school board to maintain extra trucks and vehicles. The school board has estimated "it could have sold off up to 300 trucks and other vehicles that would not be needed if the afternoon shift started when the morning shift ended."

=== Immigration Act charges ===
In 2001, Toronto School Board Trustee Sam Basra was convicted of Immigration Act charges and was forced under the Education Act to resign his seat. He pleaded guilty in August 2001 to selling fake offers of employment to potential immigrants for US$1,500 each. This came to light after being tipped by a former employee, police raided Basra's paralegal firm and found 250 false letters of employment. In March 2001 Arjan Singh launched a $15 million lawsuit against Basra alleging that while doing paralegal work, Basra forged documents to make him think his rights case was active more than a year after it was closed. After much infighting among the trustees and inaction from then chair of the board Donna Cansfield to make an appointment to fill the vacant trustee seat left by Basra, a by-election was called for April 2002 costing the board $160,000.00. Stan Nemiroff defeated former Mayor of Etobicoke Bruce Sinclair in the by-election to become the new Ward 1 trustee representing Etobicoke North.

=== Racial, religious and disability-related issues ===
In December 2001, a $70 million class-action lawsuit was filed against the Toronto District School Board on behalf of the parents of special needs students who were sent home during the boards support workers strike in April 2001. The suit claimed that 27,000 students in special education were discriminated against on the basis of their disabilities because they were sent home during the month-long strike while the schools stayed open for their able-bodied counterparts. The claims were based on the fact that they were not permitted to go to school and missed a month of school while everyone else was able to go. The suit also claimed that the Toronto District School Board should stop treating students in special education as lesser students. The four-week strike, led by 13,000 support workers, ended in early May 2001.

On November 14, 2005, the Ontario Human Rights Commission reached a settlement with the Toronto District School Board following a commission-initiated complaint against the board in July 2005. On July 7, 2005, the commission initiated a complaint against the board in the public interest and on behalf of racialized students and students with disabilities alleging that the application of the Safe Schools Act and the board's policies on discipline are having a disproportionate impact on racial minority students and students with disabilities. The complaint alleges that the board had failed to meet its duty to accommodate racialized students and students with disabilities in the application of discipline, including providing adequate alternative education services for racial minority students and students with disabilities who are suspended or expelled and that the above amounts to a failure on the part of the board to provide equal access to education services and that it constitutes discrimination and contravenes sections 1, 11 and 9 of the Ontario Human Rights Code. The TDSB accepts and acknowledges a widespread perception that the application of Ontario's school disciplinary legislation, regulations and policies can have a discriminatory effect on students from racialized communities and students with disabilities and further exacerbate their already disadvantaged position in society.

In 2005, controversy erupted when the TDSB's board chair Sheila Ward and executive officer of student and community equity, Lloyd McKell, spoke in favour of "Black-focused schools". The proposal brought about a media backlash, as many interpreted this as a "Black-only" school. After long and sometimes raucous debate, the proposal for an Africentric school was adopted, and registration began. Similar controversy had taken place in the North York Board of Education in the 1980s, when the board attempted to turn Georges Vanier Secondary School into a black-only school.

With antisemitic incidents seldom in the TDSB schools (see History of the Jews in Toronto), one incident occurred in November 2016 when the walls were sprayed with antisemitic graffiti at David Hornell Junior School in Etobicoke. The TDSB has encouraged its staff to report such incidents to the police. Similarly on April 18, 2018, at Northern Secondary School, the poster of the school's Jewish club were defaced with anti-semitic markings.

In December 2017, school administrators at the High Park Alternative Junior School had characterized the song, Land of the Silver Birch, attributed by Pauline Johnson, as racist. In a letter to parents they said, "While its lyrics are not overtly racist . . . the historical context of the song is racist." Other experts disagreed with this assertion and the music teacher who had the song performed at a school concert sued the administration for defamation.

Another case occurred in 2018 when former Etobicoke School of the Arts principal Peggy Aitchison came under fire following allegations of racial profiling after many of the students and parents became outraged after seeing the list — which many now call the "black list" — that Aitchison used the school's yearbook to identify black students. Aitchison had served a similar case during her tenure as principal at Forest Hill and Central Commerce Collegiates. However, in May 2019, the TDSB placed two administrators of Glenview Senior Public School on leave following accusations of racist bullying involving two pupils in which a white boy allegedly punched a black girl in the face two months prior.

In 2021, the school board disciplined a French immersion teacher for using a "racially insensitive" poem by Jacques Prévert.

=== School violence ===
A number of violent encounters and tragedies have sparked growing concern, raising doubts on the ability of the TDSB to provide a safe educational environment. Stakeholders believe that the TDSB is failing on their promise of a harmonious learning environment for Toronto's youth. The Toronto District School Board location is known for having a high rate of violence among youths. The year 2013 saw the highest number of youths killed by guns in the district of Toronto including 7 teens who were 16 years old at the time of the incidents. Media statistics have estimated that Toronto's shooting victims, all males in 2013, have gotten younger. Their average age is estimated to be around 22 years old, down from 26 years old in 2012.

==== Past incidents ====
One of the incidents prior to the amalgamation of the boards saw a wave of violence by October 1994. At first, an ambush involving black and white students occurred at Brockton High School. Minutes after the attack occurred, another student had been beaten and stabbed. Afterwards, police discovered a cache of weapons in a gym bag. At least four students received criminal charges. On Thursday October 20, 1994, a guidance counselor and an assistant principal were shot in their offices. They received chest, leg, and shoulder wounds but remained alive. A 27-year-old student was charged with attempted murder.

The first incidents of violence directly affecting a TDSB secondary school occurred in 2007, when Jordan Manners, a 15-year-old student, was shot and killed in the hallway of C.W. Jefferys Collegiate Institute. After the highly publicized death of Manners, the safety and security of TDSB schools was scrutinized and questioned. Prior to the Jordan Manners' shooting, 81% of students at CW Jefferys reported feeling safe at schools; after the shooting this dropped 37 percentage points to 44%. A panel was set up after the Jordan Manners shooting to address the issue of school safety. However, The TDSB has been accused of, "failing to take immediate steps, there are areas where they have chosen not to follow the panel's recommendations.".

A similar incident also took place on September 16, 2008, when a 16-year-old boy was shot in the chest in the parking lot of Bendale Business and Technical Institute following an altercation involving several people. The victim was subsequently hospitalized in critical condition. The next day, Toronto Police announced it had made two arrests in the case; 18-year-old Mark Deicsics, was charged with armed robbery. The incident prompted authorities to lockdown not only Bendale, but three other nearby schools, including (David and Mary Thomson Collegiate Institute) for almost three hours.

In September 2009, a Grade 11 student was stabbed during lunch hour at Bloor Collegiate Institute. Katherine Evans, the principal of the school, stated that this was the first stabbing at the school that she was aware of. For about two hours, the school was in "secure mode" where nobody was allowed in or out of the building. However, the school wasn't in lockdown as students were allowed to move around the school.

On September 23, 2014, another outbreak of violence occurred when Hammid Aminzada, a 19-year-old North Albion Collegiate Institute student, was fatally stabbed on school grounds after attempting to break up a fight between two students. The TDSB director of education Donna Quan announced that the board would "soon begin an independent review into the facts surrounding the events leading to and following the death of Hamid and to determine if more can be done to prevent such deaths and to improve support and engagement of students and families". As a response, the TDSB sent out a press release on October 20, 2014, it listed and reviewed the facts surrounding the events leading up to and after the reported incident. In it they stated they would appoint a steering team to examine the circumstances pertaining to the occurrence and assess both the system and crisis response procedures.

On the afternoon of February 14, 2022, an 18-year-old grade 12 student of David and Mary Thomson Collegiate Institute, Jahiem Robinson, was shot and killed after the end of the school day by a 14-year-old student with a handgun who then allegedly tried to shoot another student, but the gun failed to fire. The suspect, whose identity is withheld under the Youth Criminal Justice Act, was taken into custody later that same day and was charged with murder and attempted murder. This incident was the first major fatality inside a TDSB high school since the death of Manners in 2007 and had impacted the community. There are calls for the re-establishment of the School Resource Officer program, introduced in 2008 and was eliminated in 2017 under pressure from the Black Lives Matter activists.

==== Past violence-prevention initiatives ====
In the late 1990s the Tory government implemented a strategy to eliminate violence and illegal behavior on school grounds. The effort has been referred to as "Safe Schools Culture" which had a destructive effect on disenfranchised youth, especially African-Canadian. The approach lead to mass suspensions and other forms of conventional discipline that did not take into account the complex needs of the youth. The zero tolerance philosophy lead to abundant suspensions and expulsions under a "one size fits all" mentality. The culture tended toward pushing youths out of schools without essential support systems.

==== Violence-prevention initiatives ====
Steps against the violence in schools have led to the implementation of the school's Community Safety Advisory Panel following any major incident of violence on school grounds. The panel is responsible for conducting an independent review into the facts surrounding the incident. "The reviews will assist us in understanding the circumstances around this tragic incident to ensure that we continue moving the gains we've made in creating safe and caring school environments out to our school communities". Additionally, every second year the Toronto District School Board conducts a School Climate Survey within their schools to gain direct results and understanding from students, school staff and parents about the overall school climate. These surveys are used to make informed planning decisions about programs to help prevent bullying and promote a safe and inclusive school environment.

=== School mosque ===
In 2011, it was revealed that a TDSB school, Valley Park Middle School, had been holding Muslim prayer services for students in its cafeteria during school hours. The prayer services lasted 30 to 40 minutes, and were led by an Imam from a nearby mosque, though later this was changed to a student-led format to stem criticisms.

School administration prepared the cafeteria space, and non-Muslim students attended classes during the prayer sessions. During the prayers, boys and girls were separated by benches, with girls placed behind the boys. Menstruating girls did not participate, but could observe from the back row. The Huffington Post commented:

This school is allowing children to skip class so that they can pray during school hours in a secular public school system, all the while instilling the misconceived notion that menstruating girls are somehow unclean and should be pushed to the back of the figurative bus, which in this case is represented by the cafeteria turned makeshift mosque.

TDSB's Executive Superintendent of Equity and Engagement, Jim Spryopoulos noted, "we have the duty to accommodate", in keeping with the Toronto District School Board's Religious Accommodation policy.

=== Culture of fear ===
In 2014, the Province of Ontario appointed Margaret Wilson to lead an independent review of operational issues at the TDSB. Wilson conducted over sixty interviews, and reviewed documents, letters, and hundreds of emails. Her conclusion was that a "climate of fear" existed within the TDSB. Wilson wrote:

I saw little recognition among experienced trustees that they might be responsible for at least some of the 'climate of fear'...nor did I see any recognition among very senior staff that they too had a part in creating that climate.

Wilson stated that many employees believed their phones and computers were being monitored.

Wilson submitted ten recommendations to Liz Sandals, the Minister of Education. Sandals commented about the report: "The culture of fear, which may have started at the upper levels of the board, is getting dangerously close to the classroom...we have to stop that."

In April 2015—three months after the release of the Wilson Report—it was revealed that the TDSB had placed a covert camera inside a clock located in the office of a TDSB principal. About the incident, Wilson commented "It did strike me as part of the whole climate at the board". Following that revelation, TDSB Director Donna Quan issued a statement assuring "there are no hidden cameras in any office of a principal/vice-principal employed by the TDSB."

The TDSB held no public inquiry into the culture of fear, and offered no compensation to those affected. In 2016, the former director John Malloy said:

Everyone who meets me wants to talk about the culture of fear and I understand that, fine, but what I have to be talking about or I won't be effective in this role, is what we can do to move forward.

=== Book club event ===
The superintendent, Helen Fisher, expressed concerns about book-club events featuring Marie Henein and Nadia Murad, a Nobel Prize laureate and activist. Fisher indicated that students would not participate in the event, citing concerns that Murad's book, The Last Girl, would potentially foster Islamophobia. This decision was later characterized by the school board as part of a "misunderstanding."

== See also ==
- Toronto Catholic District School Board, the English-language Catholic school board that also operates in Toronto
- Conseil scolaire Viamonde, the French-language school board that also operates in Toronto
- Conseil scolaire de district catholique Centre-Sud, the French-language Catholic school board in Toronto
- List of school districts in Ontario
