= Jarvis Collegiate Institute =

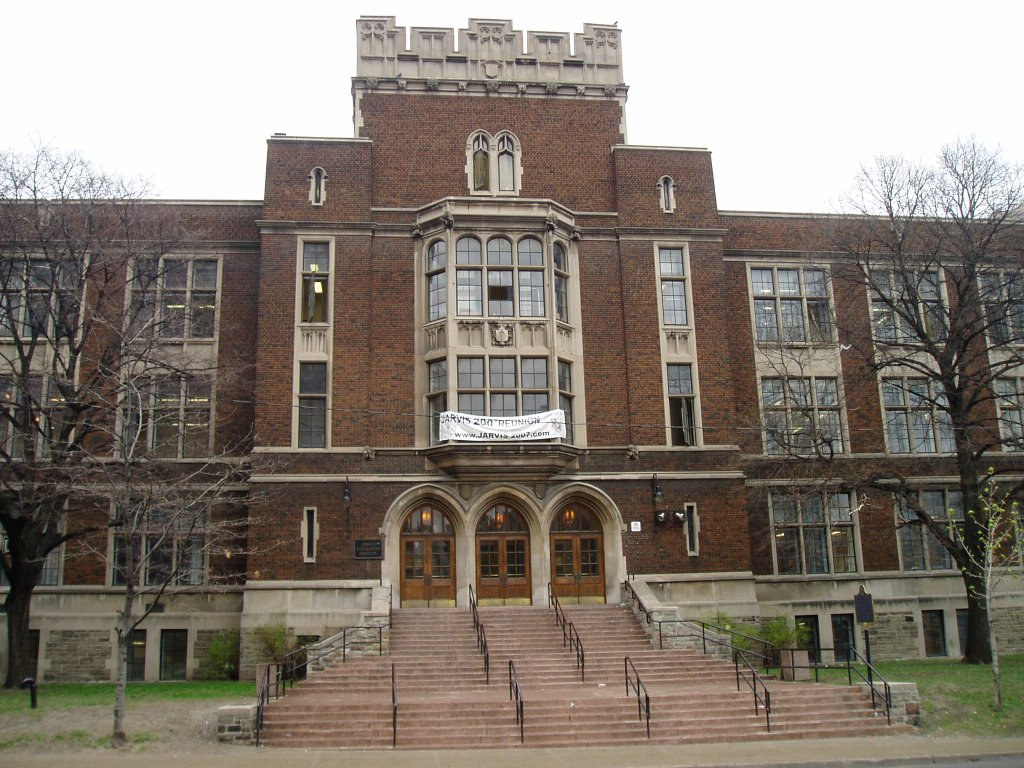

Location
- 495 Jarvis Street; Toronto, Ontario, M4Y 2G8; Canada; 43.665971°N 79.377393°W

Information
- School type: High school
- Motto: Nil Decet Invita Minerva ("Nothing is seemly, unless with Minerva, Goddess of Wisdom")
- Founded: 1807; 219 years ago
- School board: Toronto District School Board
- Superintendent: Mary Linton
- Area trustee: Chris Moise
- Principal: Stephen Bain
- Grades: 9-12
- Enrolment: 623 (2019-20)
- Language: English
- Colours: Red, White and Blue
- Mascot: Bulldog
- Team name: Jarvis Bulldogs; Jarvis Centurions (rugby)
- Website: schools.tdsb.on.ca/jarvisci/
- Last updated: September 24, 2020

Jarvis Collegiate Institute is a high school in Toronto, Ontario, Canada. It is named after Jarvis Street where it is located. It is a part of the Toronto District School Board (TDSB). Prior to 1998, it was within the Toronto Board of Education (TBE).

Founded in 1807, it is the oldest active high school in Ontario. Kingston Collegiate and Vocational Institute, founded c. 1792), was the oldest but closed in 2020.

== History ==
Jarvis Collegiate was founded as a private school in 1797 by William Cooper (1761-1840) but closed in 1801 when Cooper changed his occupation. In 1807 the government of Ontario, then known as the British colony of Upper Canada, took over the school and incorporated it in a network of eight new, public grammar schools (secondary schools), one for each of the eight districts of Upper Canada. Of the eight were four key schools:

- Eastern Grammar School or Cornwall Grammar School c. 1806 was located in Cornwall, Ontario
- Western Grammar School c. 1854 or J. C. Patterson Collegiate Institute was located in Windsor, Ontario; school closed in 1973
- Home District Grammar School in Toronto - Jarvis was the grammar school for the Home District, an area covering much of the modern GTA. Its first name was the Home District Grammar School.
- Midland Grammar Schools or Kingston Grammar School c. 1792 then as Midland Grammar School 1807 in Kingston, Ontario

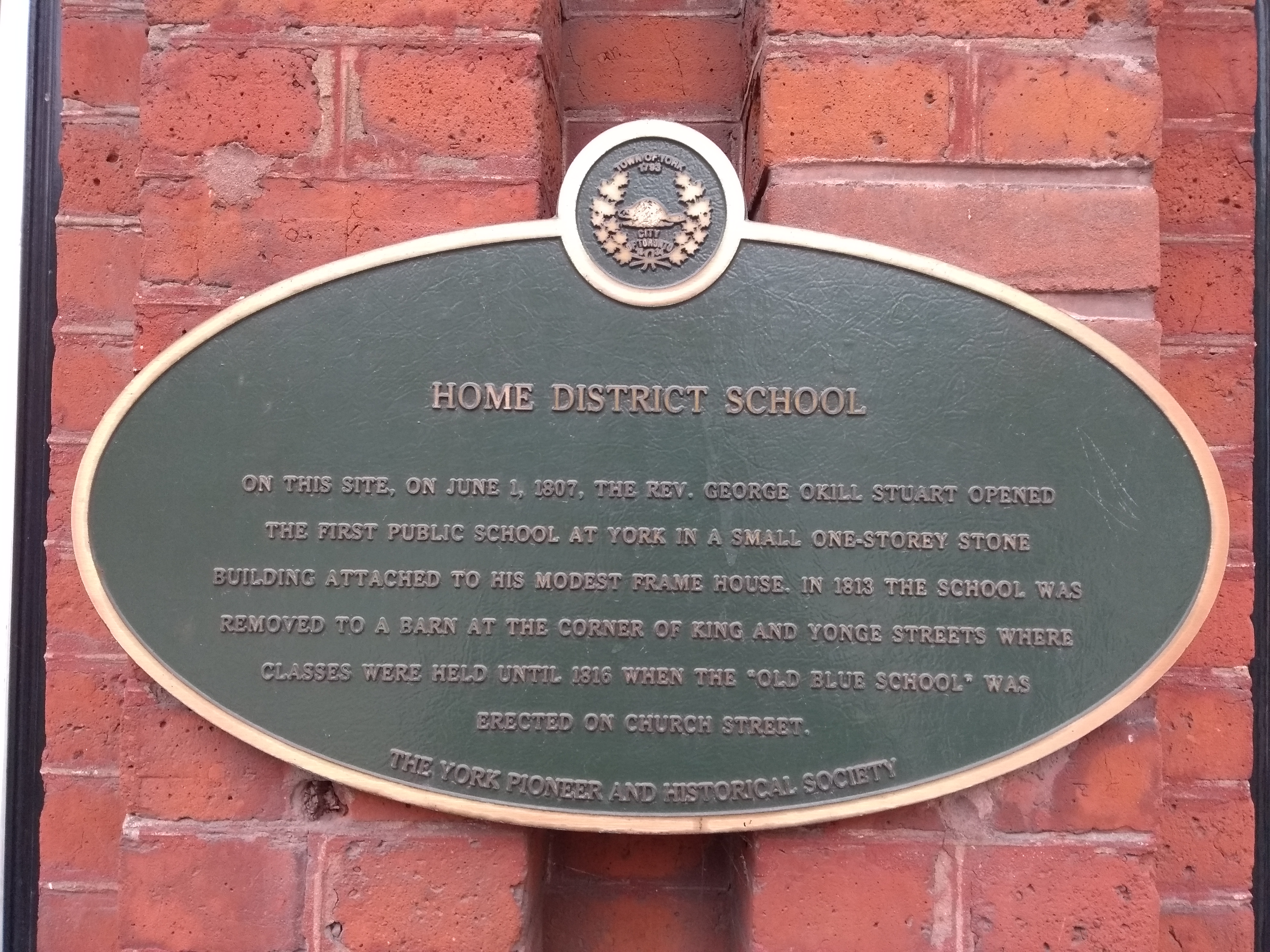
Commemorative plaque marking the original location of the Home District Grammar School

These were the early days of Toronto, when the first parliament buildings were established and the first church and jail were constructed. In fact, it was only fourteen years earlier that Governor John Graves Simcoe arrived at the location on Lake Ontario, home to Mississauga communities and site of important Indigenous trade routes, to lay out the design of the new town he named York.

After the early period 1807-1811, enrolment started at five, rose to twenty, then fell to four - the school gained momentum in 1812 when the redoubtable John Strachan took over as headmaster. In 1839, Strachan became the first Anglican bishop of Toronto, living grandly in a home known as the "Palace" and signing his name (following the "first name / diocese" format customary for Anglican bishops) "John Toronto". He also founded Trinity College.

The original 1807 school building was a shed attached to the headmaster's house. Strachan raised funds for a new two-storey building, completed in 1816 on College Square, a 6-acre (24,000 m^{2}) lot north of St. James' Cathedral, bounded by Richmond, Adelaide, Church and Jarvis Streets. In 1825 the school was renamed the Royal Grammar School. Later the name was changed to Toronto High School. In 1829 it moved to the corner of Jarvis and Lombard Streets. When Upper Canada College was founded in 1829 it shared a building with the Grammar School and for several years the two organizations were essentially unified. UCC eventually moved to its own facilities.

By 1864, the three rooms of the schoolhouse were inadequate for the 150 students, so a new building was constructed on Dalhousie Street, just north of Gould Street, near present-day Toronto Metropolitan University. This was also the year of the founding of the Toronto Grammar School Mental Improvement Society, the predecessor to all school clubs. Later known in schools as "the Lit," the club was a literary and debating society. Originally exclusively for boys, the club began admitting girls in 1893. It was also around this time that the first debates between schools were held in Toronto, the competing schools being Parkdale Collegiate Institute and Harbord Collegiate Institute. In the following decade, once again growing enrolment necessitated a new building. As the school underwent construction between 1870 and 1871, classes were held in a vacant insane asylum at Queen's Park, where the east wing of the legislative buildings are located today.

In 1871 the new building opened at 361 Jarvis Street, just south of College Street, directly in front of Allan Gardens. In 1889, the annexation of Parkdale brought a second high school (Parkdale Collegiate Institute) to the board, precipitating yet another name change from Toronto High School to Jarvis Street High School. The school was given its current name, Jarvis Collegiate Institute, in 1890. In 1924 it moved to its current Collegiate Gothic building designed by architect Charles Edmund Cyril Dyson.

From 1928 to 1930, Toronto artist George Agnew Reid painted an ambitious multi-wall mural in the school with the help of his student Lorna Claire. The piece, honouring the staff and students killed on active duty in WWI, has never been covered or removed.

Jarvis Collegiate celebrated its 200th anniversary in 2007.

== Principals ==
Principal	Years	Born	Education	Other positions held
Rev George Okill Stuart	1807–1812	Fort Hunter near Amsterdam, New York emigrated to Canada 1781	Union College, Schenectady, New York; King's College, Windsor, Nova Scotia; A.B., Harvard College	Archdeacon of York, Ontario; Archdeacon of Kingston, Ontario
Rt Rev John Strachan	1812–1822	Aberdeen, Scotland emigrated to Canada 1799	King's College, Aberdeen	Superintendent of Education for Upper Canada; First Anglican Bishop of Toronto
Rev Samuel Armour	1822–1825	Scotland		Founding Headmaster; Peterborough Collegiate and Vocational School
Rev Dr Thomas Phillips	1825–1830	England	Cambridge University	
Amalgamation	1830–1834			
Rev Duncan MacAulay	1834–1836	Scotland		
Charles Cosens	1836–1838			Resigned to teach at Upper Canada College
Marcellus Crombie	1839–1853			
Dr Michael Howe	1853–1863	Ireland emigrated to Canada 1851	Trinity College Dublin	Founding Headmaster; Galt Grammar School; Headmaster; Newington College
Rev Arthur Wickson	1863–1872		University of Toronto	Worked with the Christian Instruction Society
Dr Archibald MacMurchy	1873–1899	Scotland	University of Toronto	
Major Fred Manley	1900–1906		Jarvis Collegiate Institute	Put down the Riel Rebellion; Fought at Battle of Batoche
Dr Luther Embree	1906–1914		University of Toronto	Transferred from Parkdale Collegiate Institute
John Jeffries	1914–1934		University of Toronto	
Fred Clarke	1934–1939			
Arthur Allin	1939–1950			Taught at Jarvis from 1913
James T. Jenkins	1950–1952	Whitchurch Twp.	University of Toronto	Math teacher at Jarvis for 28 years
Milton Jewell	1952–1969		B.A., University of Western Ontario	Principal; Malvern Collegiate Institute; 1946-1952
Eric McCann	1969–1974		Riverdale Collegiate; B.A., University of Toronto	Vice-Principal; Danforth Collegiate and Technical Institute
Ann Shilton	1974–1983		Jarvis Collegiate Institute	Vice-Principal; Heydon Park Collegiate; Principal; Greenwood Secondary School
Janet Ray	1983–1989			
David Wells	1989–1994			Principal; Malvern Collegiate Institute
David MacDonald	1995			
Pauline McKenzie	1995–2009			
Andrew Gold	2009			
Elizabeth Addo	2009–2013			
Michael Harvey	2013–2023			
Stephen Bain	2023–			

== In the media ==
- The 2013 remake of Stephen King's novel, Carrie, was filmed at Jarvis Collegiate Institute as well as Northern Secondary School.
- My Big Fat Greek Wedding (2002 film) Exterior shots of the building were filmed at Jarvis Collegiate Institute.

== Notable alumni ==
- Torquil Campbell - member of the band Stars
- Amy Millan - member of the band Stars
- David Common - CBC news correspondent
- Nicole Stoffman - actress and jazz singer
- Olivia Chow - Mayor of Toronto (2023–present), former Member of Parliament and City Councillor
- Rebecca M. Church (d. 1945), president, Imperial Order Daughters of the Empire
- Conn Smythe 1910–1912 - won Stanley Cup 7 times, owner of Toronto Maple Leafs, built Maple Leaf Gardens
- Hector Charlesworth, 1880s - first chairman of the Canadian Radio Broadcasting Corporation
- J. Miles Dale, 1970s - film producer
- Henry Lumley Drayton, 1880s - Minister of Finance, 1919–1921
- Sir Lyman Duff - Chief Justice of Canada 1933 - knighted
- William Finlayson - Ontario Minister of Lands and forests, 1930s
- Bertha Harmer, grad. 1901 - Textbook of the Principles and Practices of Nursing, standard text in hospitals across North America, translated into several language; organized Yale University's School of Nursing; director of McGill School for Graduate Nurses
- George Stewart Henry - Premier of Ontario 1930–34
- W. A. Hewitt – Canadian sports executive and journalist, inductee into the Hockey Hall of Fame
- George Ignatieff - Jarvis 1932, Canadian Ambassador to the United Nations, President of U.N. Security Council
- Stephan James - actor most notable for his role as Jesse Owens in the 2016 film Race.
- James A. Jenkins - mathematician
- David Joseph - basketball coach and former college player
- Urve Karuks - Canadian-Estonian poet and translator
- Linda Kash - actress, comedian, radio host
- Mia Kirshner - actress and writer
- Allan Lawrence - 1940s - Attorney-General of Canada
- Avi Lewis - politician and journalist (attended)
- Sir Ernest MacMillan, piano player - performed at JCI in 1905, director of Mendelssohn Choir for 15 years, conductor of Toronto Symphony for 25 years, dean of University of Toronto Faculty of Music; knighted 1935
- Chris Makepeace - actor
- Sir Allan McNab - enrolled in Jarvis during its first year, 1807, Prime Minister of Upper Canada, 1854–1856, knighted for fighting in Rebellion of 1837
- Saul Rae - Jarvis 1931 - Canadian Ambassador to the United Nations
- Sara Seager - astrophysicist and planetary scientist
- Ernest Thompson Seton, 1870s - artist, naturalist, writer
- Omond Solandt - chancellor, University of Toronto
- Ruth Elizabeth Spence (1890-1982) - teacher and historian
- Roy Thomson - won Jarvis entrance scholarship 1906; left after one year to go to work to help his family, multi-millionaire, owner of newspapers in many countries, given title Lord Thomson of Fleet
- Bert Wemp, Toronto mayor 1929
- Matei Zaharia - 1999-2003 - Founder of Apache Spark, net worth of $1.6 billion as of April 2022

== Notable staff ==
- John Strachan - significant figure in Family Compact, headmaster of Jarvis 1812–1823, founder of University of Toronto in 1827 when he secured a charter for King's College, first Bishop of Toronto 1836

== See also ==
- Education in Ontario
- List of secondary schools in Ontario
