= Nineteen Toronto =

Concert venue located in Toronto, Canada

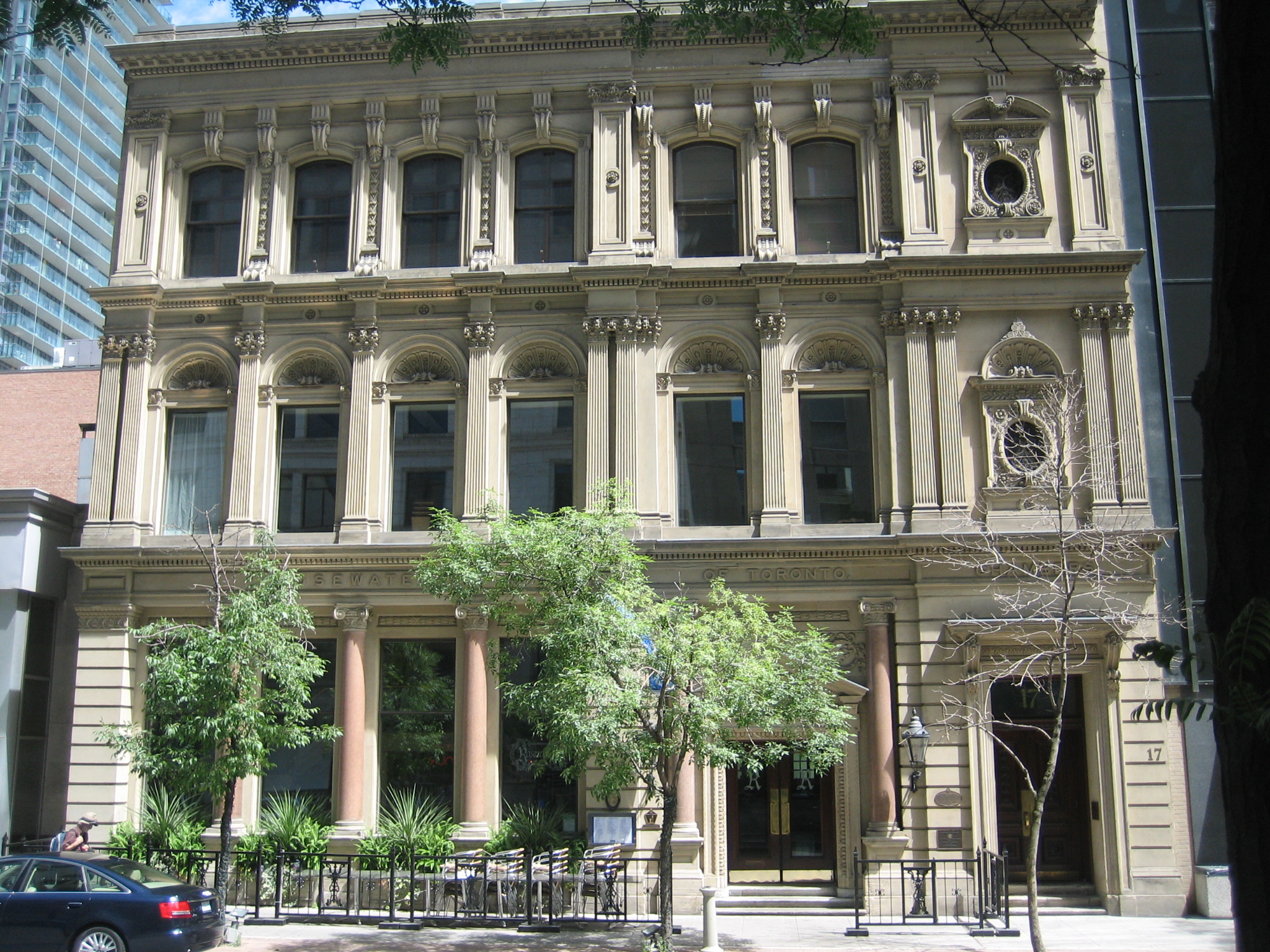
- Consumers Gas Building at 19 Toronto Street

- Location within Toronto
- Location: 19 Toronto St; Toronto, Ontario; M5C 2R1
- Coordinates: 43.390500°N 79.2234176°W
- Capacity: 2,500

Construction
- Opened: January, 2025
- Closed: September 2025

Website
- https://www.nineteentoronto.com

Nineteen Toronto is a music venue in Toronto, Ontario, Canada. It is located at 19 Toronto St, Toronto, ON, M5C 2R1. The venue hosts various events such as concerts, live entertainment, galas and community programs and events.

== Club History ==
Opened in January 2025, Nineteen Toronto is located in the Consumers' Gas Building, which was originally built 1852.

As of fall 2025, Nineteen Toronto was permanently closed and all future events were cancelled.

in April of 2026 the venue has opened up as Complex19 and currently operates as a nightclub and event space.

== Building History ==
The Italianate/neo-Renaissance style Consumers' Gas Building at 19 Toronto Street in Toronto, Ontario, Canada was first built in 1852, as the Consumers Gas company's head office. The company remained in this location for 125 years.

The 19 Toronto Street façade, designed by David B. Dick, was added to the north in 1876, and the unified façade treating the two structures as one was built by Dick, 1899. The last renovations were completed in 1983 by Stone & Kohn architects for new owners, Counsel Trust Company.

Prior to becoming Nineteen Toronto, the building was home to the Don Alfonso 1890 Italian Restaurant, the first North American outpost of the Michelin-starred Italian restaurant.

== See also ==
- List of music venues in Toronto
