= Nursing literature =

Literary topic area

Nursing literature refers to articles in journals and texts in books devoted to the field of nursing.

== History ==
=== Nursing journals ===
Under the influence of Florence Nightingale, nursing became a scientific field of study and an independent discipline in healthcare. On March 6, 1886, the first nursing journal, The Nightingale was published, becoming the first nursing journal. In 1900, the American Journal of Nursing began publication, becoming the first nursing journal to be owned and operated by nurses. It remains the oldest nursing journal still in circulation.

In 1952, the first journal dedicated to nursing research, Nursing Research was published.

As the profession grew, new journals began to be published, including journals dedicated to various nursing specialties.

Nursing journals remain a primary method in which the nursing community shares information and disseminates research findings. These journals are most often peer-reviewed and contain editorials and reports of original research, including randomized controlled trials, observational studies, systematic reviews, meta-analyses, and qualitative research. Some journals also include case reports and case studies.

With the advent of evidence-based nursing, the number of journals blossomed.

Most journal articles are indexed in National Library of Medicine's PubMed database as well as various other databases, including CINAHL.

=== Nursing texts ===
Nightingale wrote extensively during her years as a nurse. Her most important work was Notes on Nursing in which she provided instructions for caregivers, including nurses, on how to provide care to the wounded and sick, as well as health promotion topics. Although not officially a textbook for nursing, it is considered the first scientific writing about nursing care.

The first scholarly textbook for nursing is generally accepted as Text-Book of the Principles and Practice of Nursing by Bertha Harmer, a Canadian nurse and early nurse educator. Virginia Henderson is regarded as one of the earliest nurse educators to expand the scholarly writings of nursing into textbooks for use in schools and colleges of nursing.

== See also ==
- List of nursing journals
