= Clara Brett Martin =

Canadian lawyer (1874–1923)

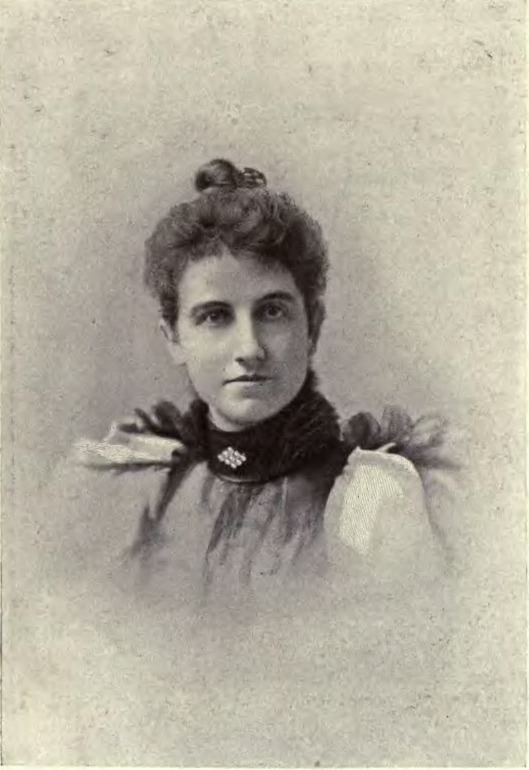
- Clara Brett Martin, 1899
- Born: January 25, 1874; Toronto, Ontario, Canada
- Died: October 30, 1923 (aged 49); Toronto, Ontario, Canada
- Resting place: St. James Cemetery, Toronto
- Education: Trinity College, Toronto (BA); Osgoode Hall Law School (BCL); University of Toronto (LLB)
- Occupation: Lawyer
- Known for: First woman lawyer in the British Empire

Clara Brett Martin (25 January 1874 – 30 October 1923) was a Canadian lawyer. She opened the way for women to become lawyers in Canada by being the first female lawyer in the British Empire in 1897.

== Life and career ==
Clara was born in Toronto in 1874. She was the twelfth and youngest child of Abraham and Elizabeth Martin, Anglican-Irish farmers. The family placed great importance on education; her father had been a superintendent of education for the township and at least three of her siblings became teachers. All her siblings attended university.

In 1890, Martin was accepted to Trinity College in Toronto, only three years after it began to admit women. In 1893, she graduated with a Bachelor of Arts in mathematics at the age of sixteen, which was almost unheard of because of the masculinity associated with that field at the time.

In 1891, Martin submitted a petition to the Law Society of Upper Canada to permit her to become a student member, a prerequisite to articling as a clerk, attending lectures and sitting the exams required to receive a certificate of fitness to practice as a solicitor.

Her petition was rejected by the Law Society after contentious debate, with the Special Committee reviewing the petition interpreting the statute which incorporated the Law Society as permitting only men to be admitted to the practice of law. W.D. Balfour sponsored a bill that provided that the word "person" in the Law Society's statute should be interpreted to include females as well as males. Martin's cause was also supported by prominent women of the day including Doctor Emily Stowe and Lady Aberdeen. With the support of the Premier, Oliver Mowat, legislation was passed on April 13, 1892, and permitted the admission of women as solicitors. As Canada prepared to enter the 20th century, women were barred from participation in, let alone any influence on or control over, the legal system at its fullest—women could not be voters, legislators, coroners, magistrates, judges or jurors. They were visible in the courts as litigants, witnesses & accused persons.

In 1893, Martin articled with the Toronto firm of Mulock, Miller, Crowther, and Montgomery, but was treated so poorly by her articling peers and the firm's secretaries that she was forced to switch to prominent Toronto law firm Blake, Lash and Cassels, now known as Blake, Cassels & Graydon LLP.

In 1897 she graduated B.C.L. from Osgoode Hall Law School, Toronto. "After special regulations had been framed by the Law Society, ... she was called to the bar of Ontario, and entered into partnership with Messrs. Shilton & Wallbridge. In 1899 she was admitted to the degree of LL.B. by Toronto University, being the first lady in Canada to receive that honour."

Martin was elected a school trustee on the Toronto Board of Education in 1901 and served on the body for a decade as the only woman on the school board.

Martin ran for Toronto City Council in Ward 2 but was defeated in the 1920 municipal election.

== Death and legacy ==
Martin died at age 49, of a heart attack and was buried in St James Cemetery. Contemporary obituaries mourned her loss as a trailblazer for professional women.

In 1989, the provincial government announced that Martin was to be honoured by having the building housing the Ministry of the Attorney General named after her. The government revoked the honour after an anti-Semitic letter written by her in 1915 came to light.

== In popular culture ==
In the episode "On the Waterfront (Part 2)" of the crime drama Murdoch Mysteries, Martin, portrayed by Patricia Fagan, is introduced and helps the female characters in their endeavor to advance women's suffrage.

== See also ==
- Cornelia Sorabji in India
- Eliza Orme in England
- First women lawyers around the world
- Ethel Benjamin
- Ivy Williams
