= Rebecca M. Church =

Canadian teacher (died 1945)

Rebecca M. Church OBE
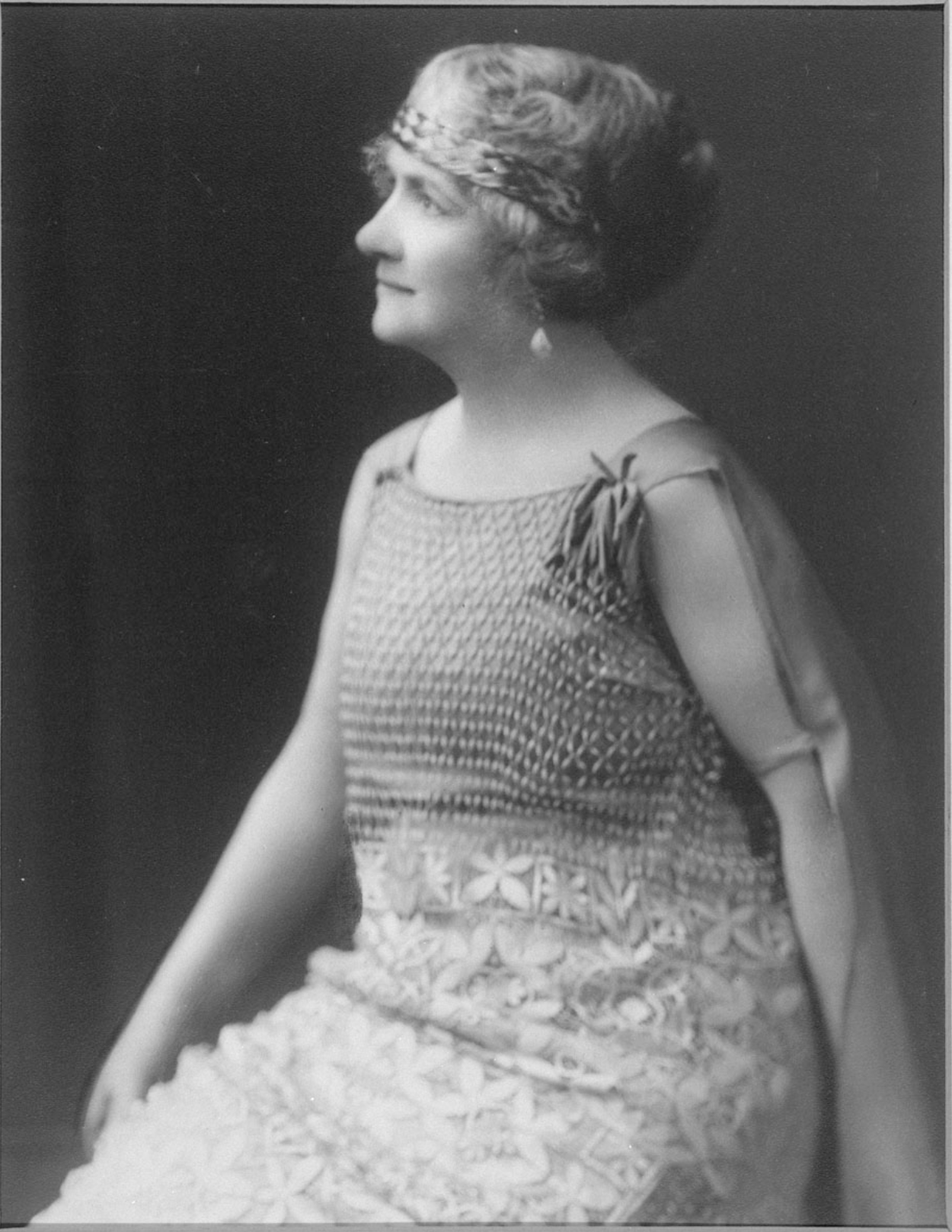
- Church, ca. 1925-28
- Born: Toronto, Canada
- Died: December 11, 1945; Toronto
- Resting place: St. James Cemetery
- Education: Jarvis Collegiate Institute; Toronto Normal School
- Occupations: Teacher; community leader
- Organization: Imperial Order Daughters of the Empire
- Title: President
- Term: 1925-28
- Relatives: Thomas Langton Church (brother)
- Awards: Order of the British Empire

Rebecca M. Church OBE (died 1945) was a Canadian teacher and community leader active in patriotic and charitable work. She served as president of the Imperial Order Daughters of the Empire (IODE). Recommended by the soldiers' organization of Canada, the OBE was conferred upon Church in 1935 in recognition of her social, community and patriotic services.

== Early life and education ==
Rebecca Mary Church was born in Toronto. Of Irish descent, she was the third daughter of John and Elizabeth Church. Her siblings included sisters Christina and Nellie, and a brother Thomas.

She was educated in public schools, graduating with a scholarship. She then attended Jarvis Collegiate Institute, and graduated from Toronto Normal School.

== Career ==
In her early career, Church was engaged in the teaching profession, being particularly successful in "Methods of Primary Work", as evinced by the fact of her being selected as Critic Teacher for Students in training from the Toronto Normal School and the Faculty of Education, University of Toronto.

On the election of her brother, Thomas Langton Church, to the Mayoralty of Toronto (1915-1922), she resigned her teaching position to assist in social functions during her brother's term as mayor.

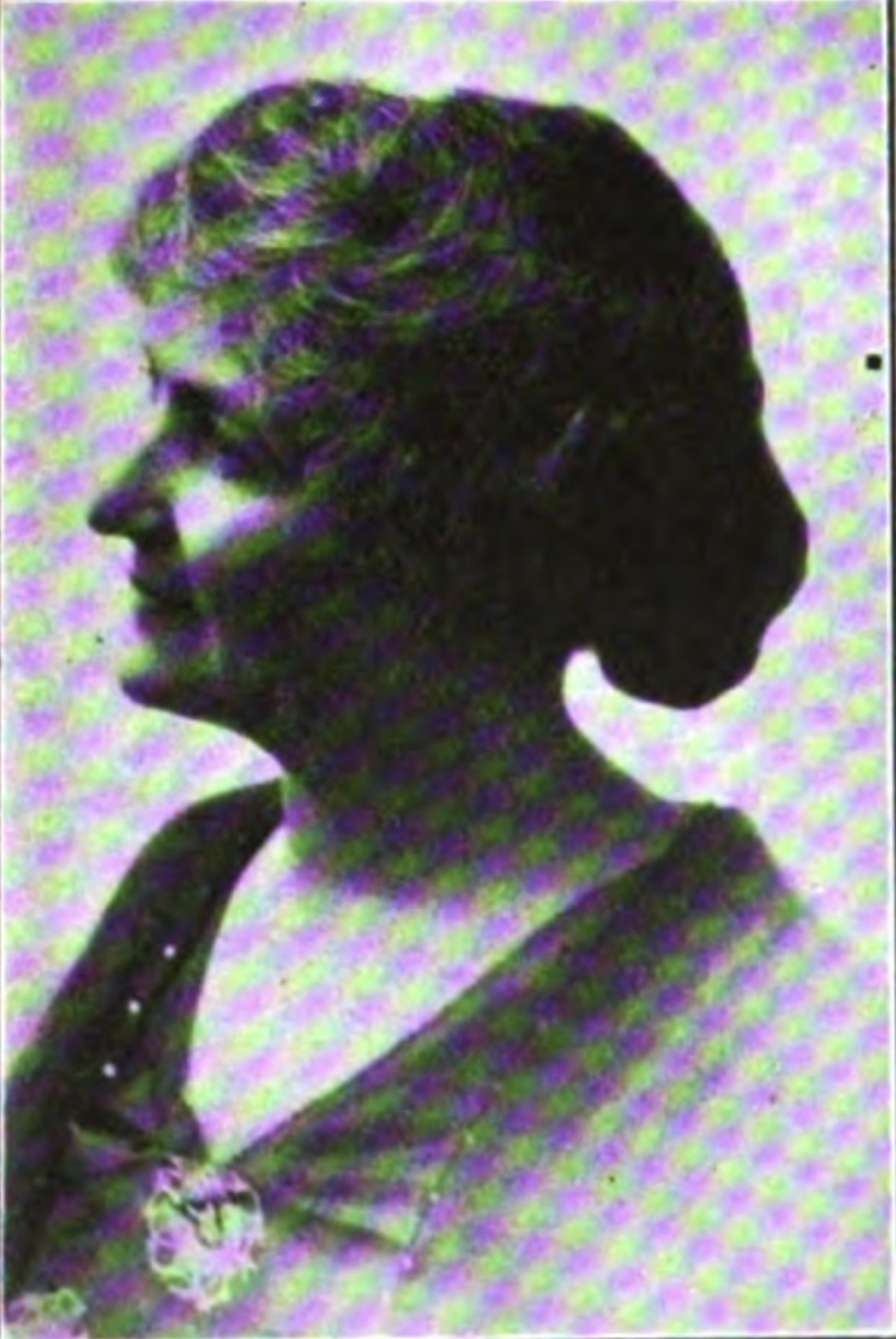
Church in 1927

During World War I, Church assisted in patriotic undertakings, such as the British Red Cross, the Patriotic Fund, and the Christie Street Veterans' Hospital. She served as Convener of St. Julien Tag Day (the funds of which secured a Club House for the "Originals", also Secours Nationale); Chair, Committee for Women's Section of the Big Four Drive; and Convener of Tribute Night and Confederation Memorial Fund of July 1917. These two latter funds were subsequently used for the furnishing and equipment of seven Club Houses for all veterans of the war, in Toronto. She served as Convener of the Amputation Association Tag Day, 1918, when $47,000.00 was raised; this fund made possible a Club House for Members of the Association, at 7 College Street, and as Convener of the Women's Advisory Board of the Amputations Association, which continued to take an active interest in the welfare of all returned soldiers. She served as Honorary Secretary, Thrift Committee, and during the strenuous days of 1916-1917, Convener of Women's Organizations for Assistance in service at Banquets, given in the Armouries, arranged by the Citizens' Repatriation League.

After the war, Church served as the President, Women's Canadian Club, 1920-1921; Vice–President, Women's Patriotic League; and Vice–President, Toronto Travel Club. She was a National Life Member of the Canadian Red Cross Society; Member, Executive Committee, Toronto Branch, Red Cross Society; Member, Women's Executive Committee, Canadian National Exhibition; and Member, Humane Society. Additionally, Church was a Convener, Fire Relief Committee, Ontario; and Convener, Donation of Hospital to Haileybury, following the Great Fire of 1922.

Church was a National Life Member of the IODE. In June 1925, she was elected President, IODE, National Chapter of Canada (1925-28). She also served as Honorary Vice-Regent, Gertrude Vankoughnet Chapter, IODE.

== Personal life ==
In politics, Church was Conservative. In religion, she belonged to the Church of England. She made her home in Toronto.

Rebecca Church never married. She died in Toronto on December 11, 1945. Interment was at that city's St. James Cemetery.

== Awards and honours ==
In 1935, she received the Order of the British Empire from King George V.
