= Urve Karuks =

Canadian-Estonian poet and translator (1936–2015)

Urve Karus
- Born: Urve Ambos; 18 January 1936 Tallinn, Estonia
- Died: 18 July 2015 (aged 79) Toronto, Canada
- Occupation: Poet
- Relatives: Voldemar Aasoja (father)

Urve Karuks (née Ambos, later changed to Aasoja; 18 January 1936 – 18 July 2015) was a Canadian-Estonian poet and translator. She was known for her contribution to exile literature and was a member of the Foreign Estonian Writers' Union and the Estonian PEN-Club.

== Biography ==
Karuks was born on 18 January 1936 in Tallinn, Estonia. Her father was soldier Voldemar Aasoja [et], who was murdered in 1943. She had a brother named Ülo. In 1944, during World War II, Karuks fled to Germany with her remaining family, where she lived in refugee camps in Stubben, Schwarzenbek and Lingen. She began her education in the refugee camps and started writing poetry at age 12.

In 1951, Karuks and her family emigrated to Toronto, Canada. In Canada, Karuks was a member of the Estonian Society of Women Students [et] (Estonian: Eesti Naisüliõpilaste Selts). She was educated at the Jarvis Collegiate Institute high school, then studied sociology at the University of Toronto.

Karuks published her first poems in the literary journal Mana in 1964. She wrote in Estonian, English and German and her poetry covered typical exile literature themes such as nostalgia for Estonia's past.

Karuks received the Literary Prize of Canadian Estonians in 1969 and the laureate title of the Cultural Foundation of the Estonian Arts Center (Estonian: Eesti Kunstide Keskus) [et]. Karuks was a member of the Foreign Estonian Writers' Union from 1975, and the Estonian PEN-Club.

Karuks was married to a man named Ergo and had two children, Alar and Linda. She died on 18 July 2015 in Toronto, Canada, aged 78.

== Select publications ==
- Savi (1968)
- Kodakondur (1976)
- Laotusse lendama laukast (1992)
