= St. James Cemetery (Toronto) =

Cemetery and crematorium in Toronto, Canada

St. James' Cemetery
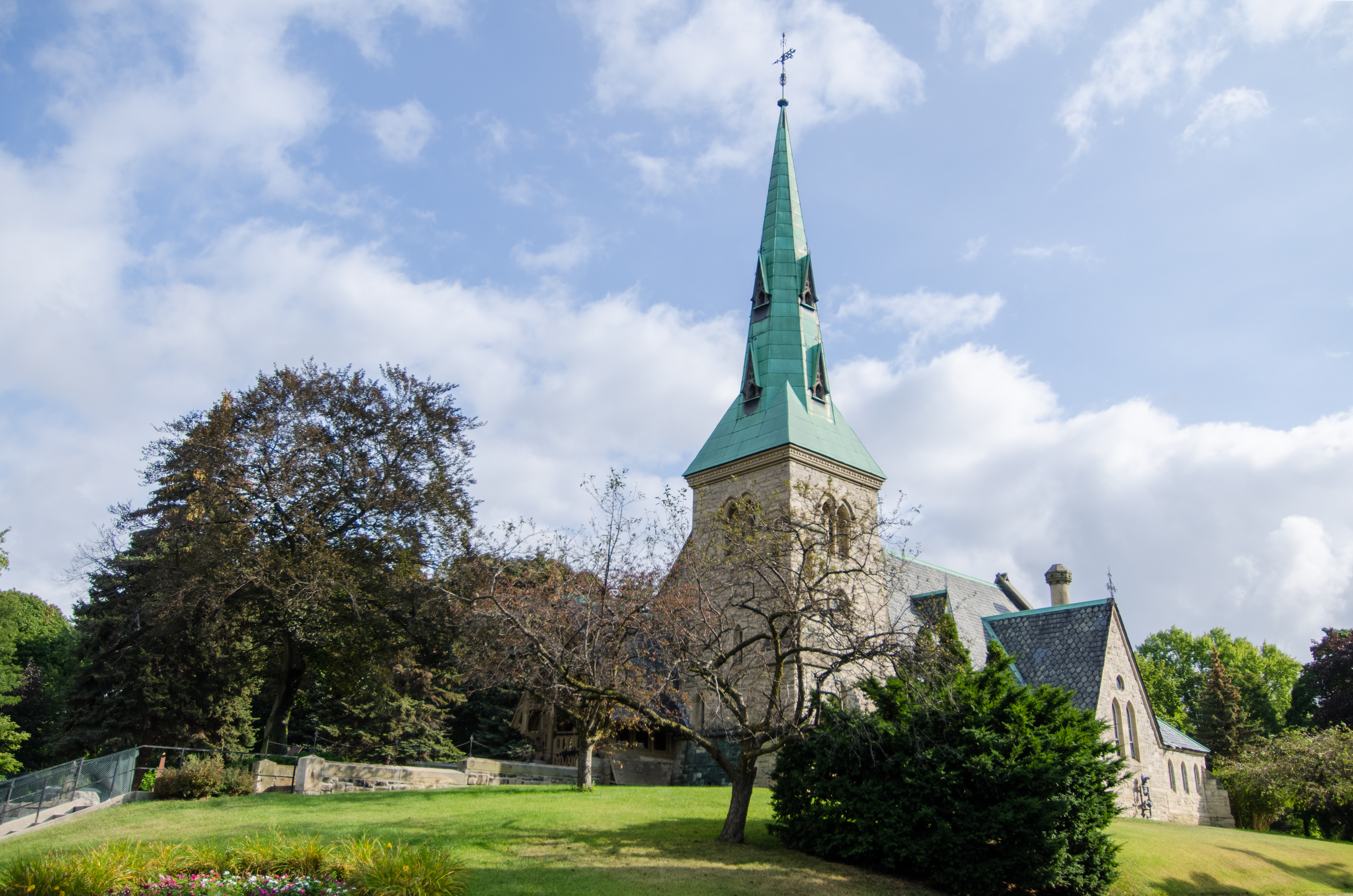
- Chapel of St. James-the-Less in St. James' Cemetery
- Interactive map of St. James' Cemetery

Details
- Established: 1844; 182 years ago
- Location: 635 Parliament Street; Toronto, Ontario, Canada
- Coordinates: 43°40′14″N 79°22′05″W
- Type: Non-denominational cemetery
- Style: Rural
- Owned by: Cathedral Church of St. James
- No. of interments: Over 95,000 interments and 114,000 cremations
- Website: stjamescemetery.ca

St. James' Cemetery and Crematorium is a historic cemetery in Toronto, Ontario, Canada. It is the oldest cemetery in Toronto that is still in use, having opened in 1844. It was originally the burial ground for the Cathedral Church of St. James, but it later became non-denominational. The main entrance to the cemetery is located at 635 Parliament Street, north of Wellesley Street East. Just to the west is the St. James Town neighbourhood, which is named after the cemetery. It is adjacent to the Toronto Necropolis cemetery.

== History ==
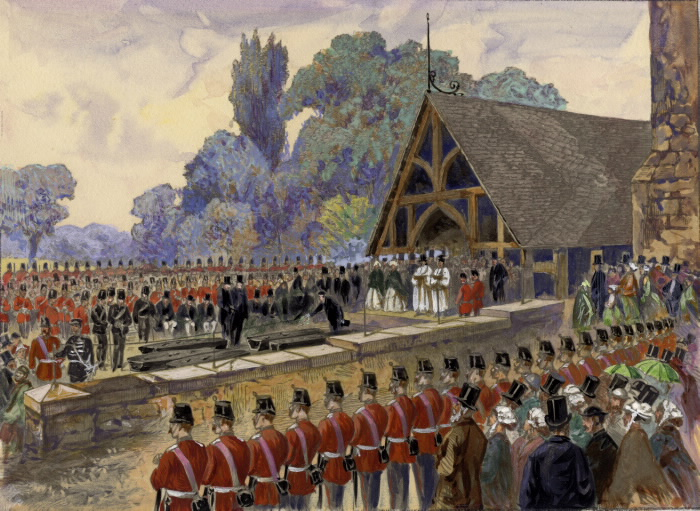
Funeral at St. James' Cemetery in 1866 for Canadian militiamen who fought in the Battle of Ridgeway.

The cemetery opened in July 1844 for the burial of people professing the Anglican faith. At that time, most of the city's population of 18,000 lived south of Queen Street West, and the cemetery's location was regarded during that era as being outside the city limits. The cemetery was necessary because the burial ground around the cathedral itself, in use since 1797, was out of room.

The large, impressive specimen of copper beech tree that grows next to the chapel was planted by the Prince of Wales (later King Edward VIII) during his visit to Canada in 1919.

Recognizing the growing trend throughout the world towards cremation, a crematorium was added in 1948. As of 2020, over 95,000 interments and 114,000 cremations have taken place at the cemetery.

The cemetery is home to the Chapel of St. James-the-Less, which sits atop a knoll at the highest point of the cemetery. In its harmonious composition, this small funeral chapel is a splendid example of Victorian Gothic design. Its sense of strength and spirituality is derived from the subtle contrast of its stone walls, enveloping roofs, and soaring spire. Erected in 1860 and opened in 1861, the chapel was designed by Cumberland and Storm, one of Toronto's leading 19th-century architectural firms. The Chapel of St. James-the-Less was designated a National Historic Site of Canada in 1990.

== Notable interments ==
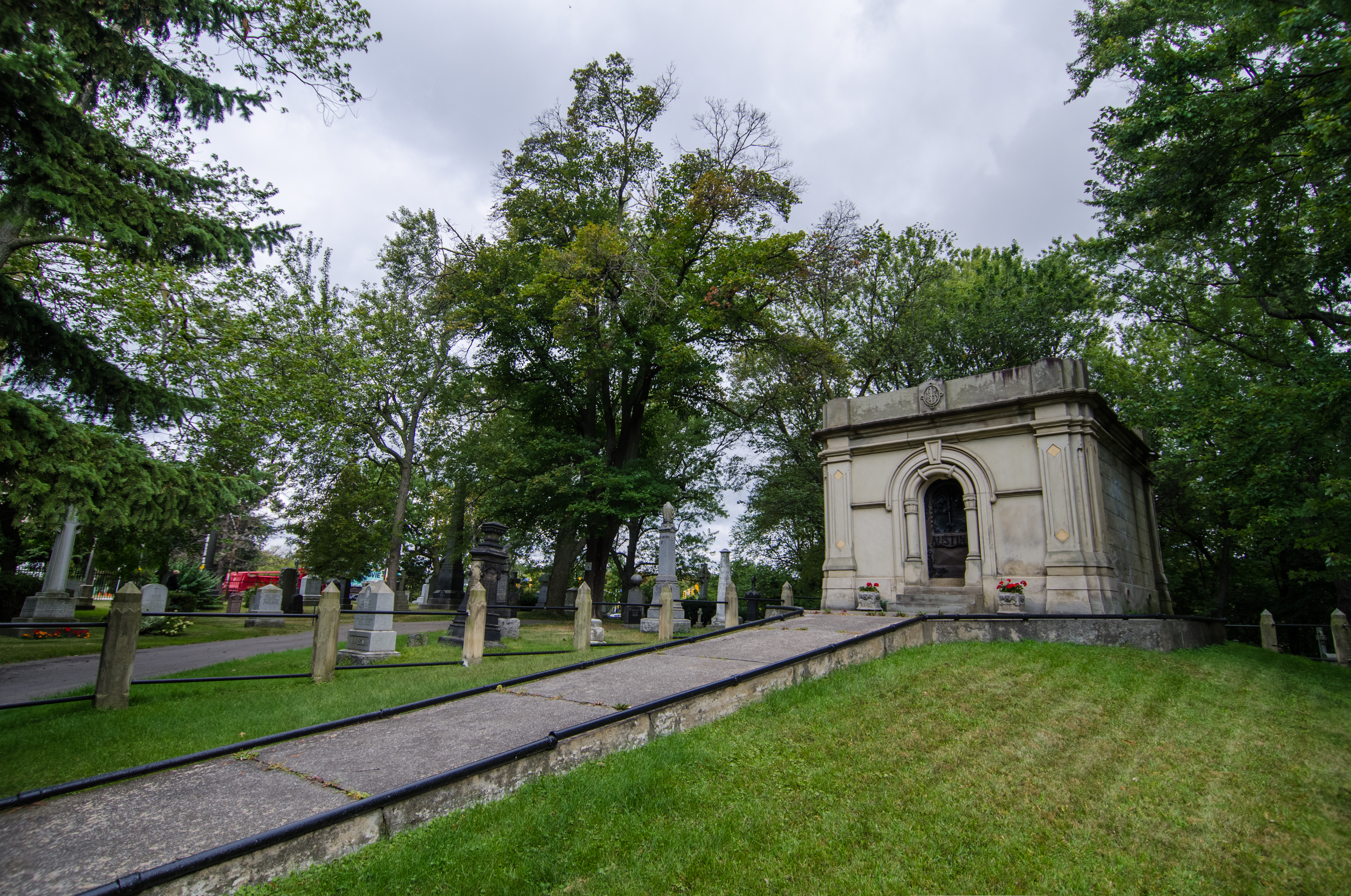
Mausoleum of James Austin, founder of The Dominion Bank (predecessor of TD Bank).

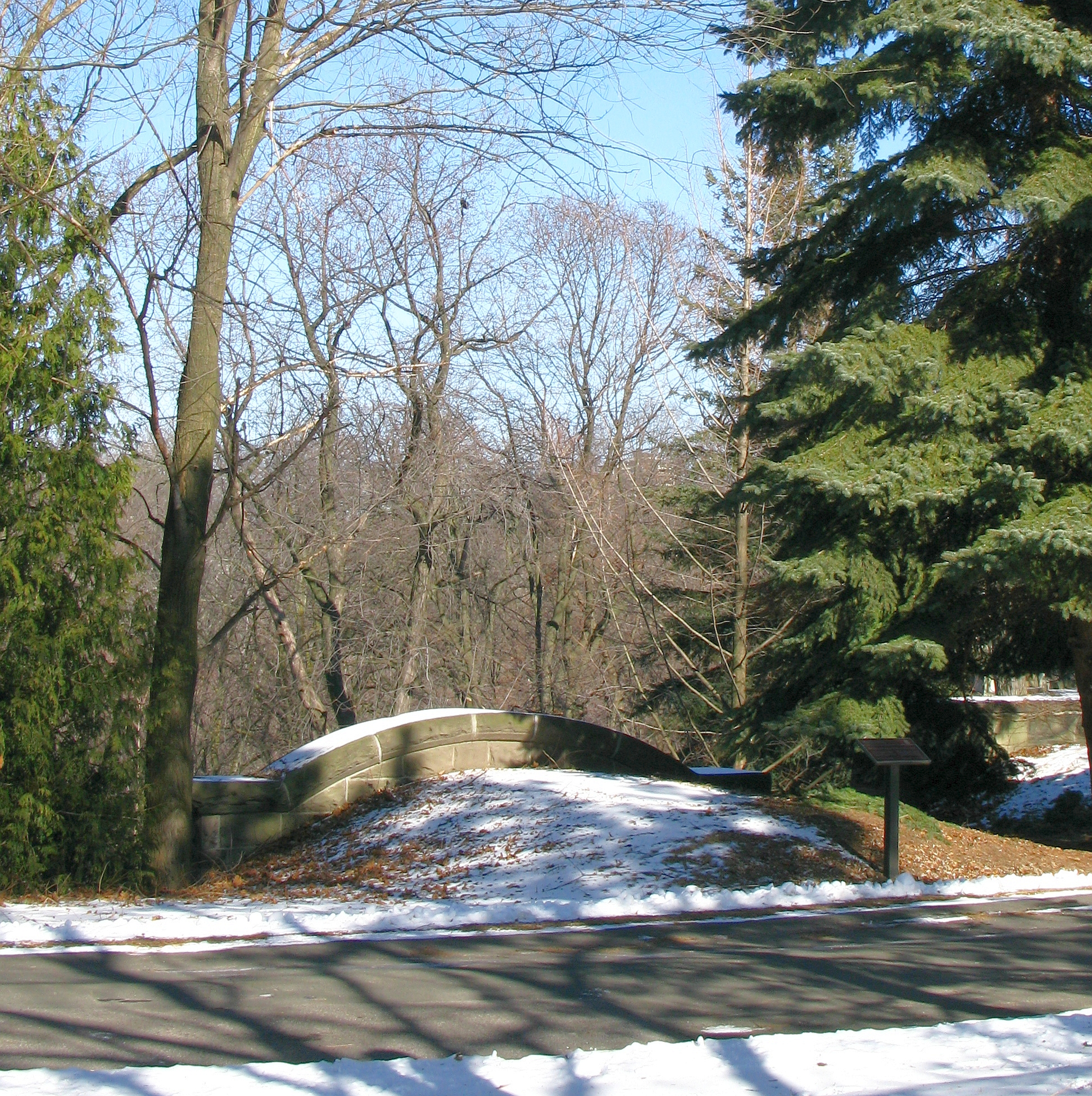
Grave of William Pearce Howland, the second Lieutenant Governor of Ontario.

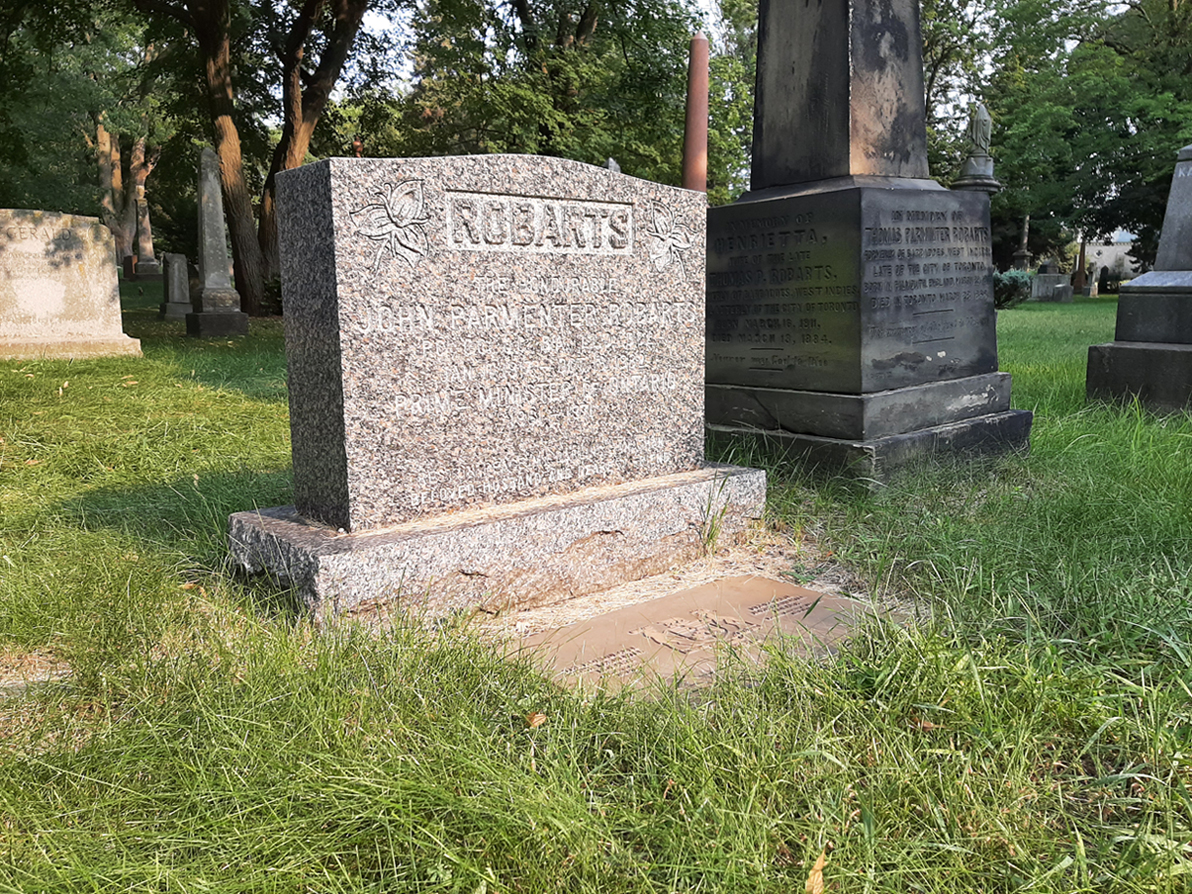
Grave of John Robarts, the seventeenth Premier of Ontario.

- Graeme Mercer Adam, author, editor, and publisher
- James Austin, founder of The Dominion Bank (predecessor of the Toronto Dominion Bank)
- Maurice Baldwin, Anglican Bishop
- Robert Baldwin, Joint Premier of the Province of Canada
- George Anthony Barber, Toronto's first school superintendent
- William Henry Beatty, lawyer and businessman
- Charles Albert Berczy, postmaster for Toronto
- Edward Blake, second premier of Ontario
- Samuel Hume Blake, lawyer and judge. Brother of Edward Blake
- Rebecca M. Church (d. 1945), president, Imperial Order Daughters of the Empire
- Hampden Cockburn, Victoria Cross recipient in the Second Boer War
- James Cockburn, Father of Confederation
- Hannah Grier Coome, founder of Sisterhood of St. John the Divine; Anglican Church of Canada saint
- Sophia Dalton, newspaper publisher
- Francis Collier Draper, Chief Constable of Toronto
- Alfred Hutchinson Dymond, writer and politician
- William Glenholme Falconbridge, lawyer and judge
- George Gooderham and William Gooderham Sr., whiskey magnates (see Gooderham and Worts)
- George Goulding, Olympic athlete
- James Grand, businessman and co-founder of Grand & Toy office supply chain
- H. J. Grasett, Toronto police chief from 1886 to 1920
- Casimir Gzowski, engineer and railway builder
- Peter Gzowski, broadcaster
- John Hawkins Hagarty, lawyer, teacher, and judge
- Esther Frances How, educator
- William Pearce Howland, Father of Confederation
- Edward Holland, recipient of the Victoria Cross; cremated at St. James Cemetery
- Aemilius Irving, lawyer
- Andrew Scott Irving, bookseller and publisher
- Robert Sympson Jameson, lawyer and politician
- Winnifred Kingsford, sculptor and teacher
- E. J. Lennox, architect of Casa Loma and Old City Hall
- Alexander Manning, contractor, businessman, and the 20th Mayor of Toronto
- Clara Brett Martin, lawyer
- John J. McLaughlin, founder of Canada Dry
- Francis Henry Medcalf, millwright, iron founder, and Mayor of Toronto
- William Ralph Meredith, politician
- Wallace Nesbitt, lawyer and puisne justice of the Supreme Court of Canada
- Abe Orpen, owner of racetracks, casino operator, businessman
- Marjorie Pickthall, writer
- James Henry Plummer, financier and businessperson
- Franklin Bates Polson, machinist, engineer and shipbuilder
- Jackie Rae, singer, songwriter and television performer; uncle of Bob Rae and brother of diplomat Saul Rae
- David Breakenridge Read, lawyer, educator, author, and Mayor of Toronto
- John P. Robarts, 17th Premier of Ontario
- John Robinson, lawyer, judge and political
- Henry Scadding, historian
- John Scarlett, developer
- Goldwin Smith, historian and journalist
- William Thomas, architect
- Christopher Widmer, physician and surgeon
- Daniel Wilson (academic)

== War graves ==
The cemetery contains the war graves of 42 Commonwealth service personnel, 16 from each of the two World Wars.
