= George Anthony Barber =

Educator and cricketer

George Anthony Barber (1802 – 20 October 1874) was an English-born educator, auditor, and sportsman who emigrated to Canada, where he became the first superintendent of Toronto's public school system and became known as the father of Canadian cricket.

Barber was born in 1802 in Hitchin, Hertfordshire, England and emigrated to Canada in 1826. Upon his arrival, he taught at the Home District grammar school in York and married Lucinda Shortiss. After teaching in for three years, he joined the Upper Canada College staff when it first opened in 1829. In his duties as collector, he was involved in a financial scandal in 1839 that forced him to put up £1,500 to cover shortfalls in the college accounts, and was forced to resign from the college as a result. The scandal, details of which are hazy, also involved Bishop John Strachan, Allan MacNab and Colonel Joseph Wells.

While at Upper Canada College, Barber started a public auditing business and beginning in 1840 he became auditor for the city of Toronto. In 1841 he was hired as editor of the Toronto Commercial Herald (later renamed Toronto Herald and Herald). He eventually took over the paper and operated it until it ceased publication in 1848.

In 1844, he became the first superintendent of schools for Toronto and was involved with the board of education in some capacity until his death. He was part of the period of critical growth for this community resource.

An avid sportsman, his particular interest in cricket led to some popularity of the sport in Canada and the establishment in 1827 of the first known cricket club in Canada, the York Cricket Club. The club was renamed the Toronto Cricket Club in 1834. In 1844, Barber participated in the first international cricket match of the modern era when Canada defeated the US. This match began a series of cricket matches between the US and Canada that lasted until the outbreak of World War One in 1914.

Barber is buried in St. James Cemetery in Toronto.
