= Esther Frances How =

Hester How
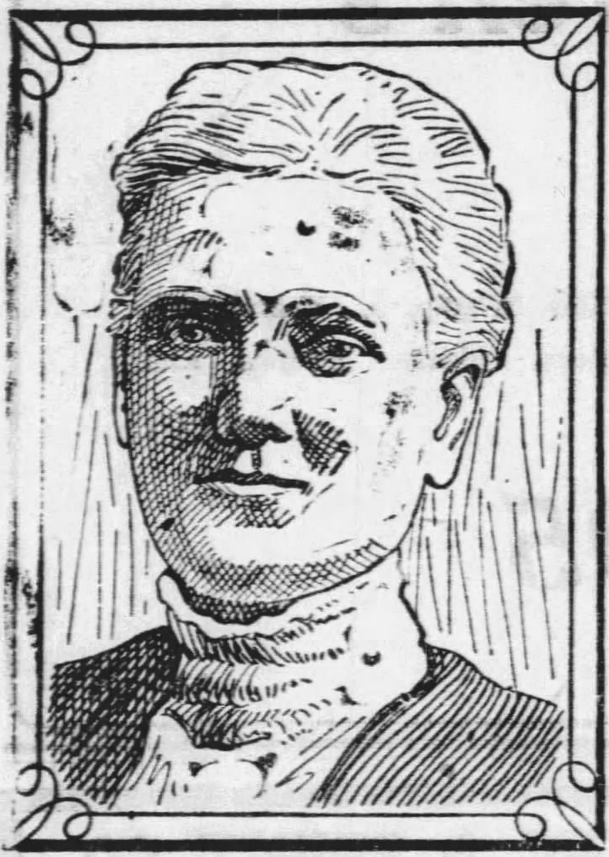
- Born: Esther Frances How; January 29, 1849; Ireland
- Died: September 22, 1915 (aged 66); Toronto, Ontario, Canada
- Burial place: St. James Cemetery
- Other name: Hessie How
- Occupation: Educator
- Known for: Public education for troubled youth in Ontario, juvenile court system

Esther Frances How (January 29, 1848 – September 22, 1915), better known as Hester How, was a teacher who helped turn around delinquent boys in 19th-century Toronto.

How was born in Ireland in 1848 to Thomas Ferguson How and Catherine J. How and immigrated to Canada West in 1849. How graduated from Toronto Normal School and began her teaching career in 1871.

It was in 1879 when How was hired under the direction of Toronto Mayor William Holmes Howland and public school inspector James L. Hughes to help establish a school for troubled youth. This helped establish her as an advocate for troubled youth. It also helped steer youth away from trouble, away from being handled in the adult court system, and toward a juvenile justice system.

The school she taught at was renamed after her in 1912, and she retired from teaching a year later.

How died in Toronto in 1915, and was buried in St. James Cemetery.

== Legacy ==
Beside Hester How Public School (former Elizabeth Street Public School now demolished and located in what is the east entrance of Hospital for Sick Children), a day care centre at Toronto City Hall (opened 1990) is named after her.
