= Sophia Dalton =

Sophia Dalton (1785-1859), was a Canadian publisher. She published and managed the newspaper The Patriot in Toronto from 1840 until 1848.

== Life ==
Sophia Simms was born in about 1785 near Birmingham in the United Kingdom. Her parents were William and Mary Simms and they lived at Hall Green. Her husband, Thomas Dalton, also came from Birmingham and after they were married they moved to Newfoundland.

She published and managed the leading conservative newspaper The Patriot in Toronto from 1840 until 1848.

She died in 1859 and is buried in St. James Cemetery in Toronto.
