= Winnifred Kingsford =

Canadian sculptor and teacher (1880–1947)

- Born: 1880; Toronto, Canada
- Died: 1947 (aged 66–67); Toronto, Canada
- Education: Toronto Art School, Central Technical School
- Style: Sculptor

Winnifred Kingsford (1880 – 1947) was a Toronto-born Canadian sculptor and teacher, considered one of Toronto's first female sculptors.

== Biography ==
Winnifred Kingsford was born in Toronto, the eldest daughter of Magistrate Rupert and Alice Kingsford. Her art studies began in Toronto; first, at the Toronto Art School (1886–1890; now OCAD University), under William Cruikshank and George Agnew Reid, and then at Central Technical School, under a Mr. Banks. She undertook further studies in sculpture in Paris for several years with Antoine Bourdelle. When Kingsford returned to Toronto, she taught art at Havergal College, a private school for girls. Until Florence Wyle and Frances Loring arrived in Toronto in 1912, Kingsford was considered to be the only practising woman sculptor in Canada. There are scant records of exhibitions of her work. She showed one sculpture in the 1912 Paris Salon (a portrait of a seated woman). In 1915, she exhibited "The Messenger" and "Woman Seated" (both in plaster) in the Works of Toronto Sculptors exhibit held at the Art Museum of Toronto (now the Art Gallery of Ontario), 13 November – 15 December.

Kingsford trained as an occupational therapist during World War I, and worked at various military hospitals later in her career.

== Commercial work ==
Kingsford produced glazed pottery lamp bases, ink wells, and vases, for sale through the commercial trade stores. These were admired by fellow artist Estelle M. Kerr, who was herself diversifying her art production to include cartoons and illustrations. For an article on Toronto women sculptors Kerr wrote for Saturday Night, she interviewed Winnifred Kingsford at work in the sculptor's Adelaide Street studio. "Kingsford," she wrote, "is clever at the more commercial forms of the sculptor's art."

The sculptor had been selling glazed pottery vases and lamp bases in Canada in the years around 1900, and in 1904 she exhibited work in the first exhibition of the Society of Arts and Crafts of Canada, held at the Art Gallery on Toronto's King Street. Moneys raised from her pottery classes and sales enabled Kingsford to study abroad for five years until she returned to Toronto in 1913. When interviewed in June 1914 Kingsford's art production included traditional sculptures as well as her commercially marketable line.

== Major works ==
Kingsford's sculpture "Seated Woman" (1912; cast c.1970) is in the collection of the National Gallery of Canada.

== Death ==
Winnifred Kingston died at the Queen Elizabeth Hospital (now merged into Toronto Rehabilitation Institute) in Toronto on 3 February 1947; she is buried in St. James' Cemetery.
