= Ontario Institute for Studies in Education =

Teacher's college of the University of Toronto, Ontario, Canada

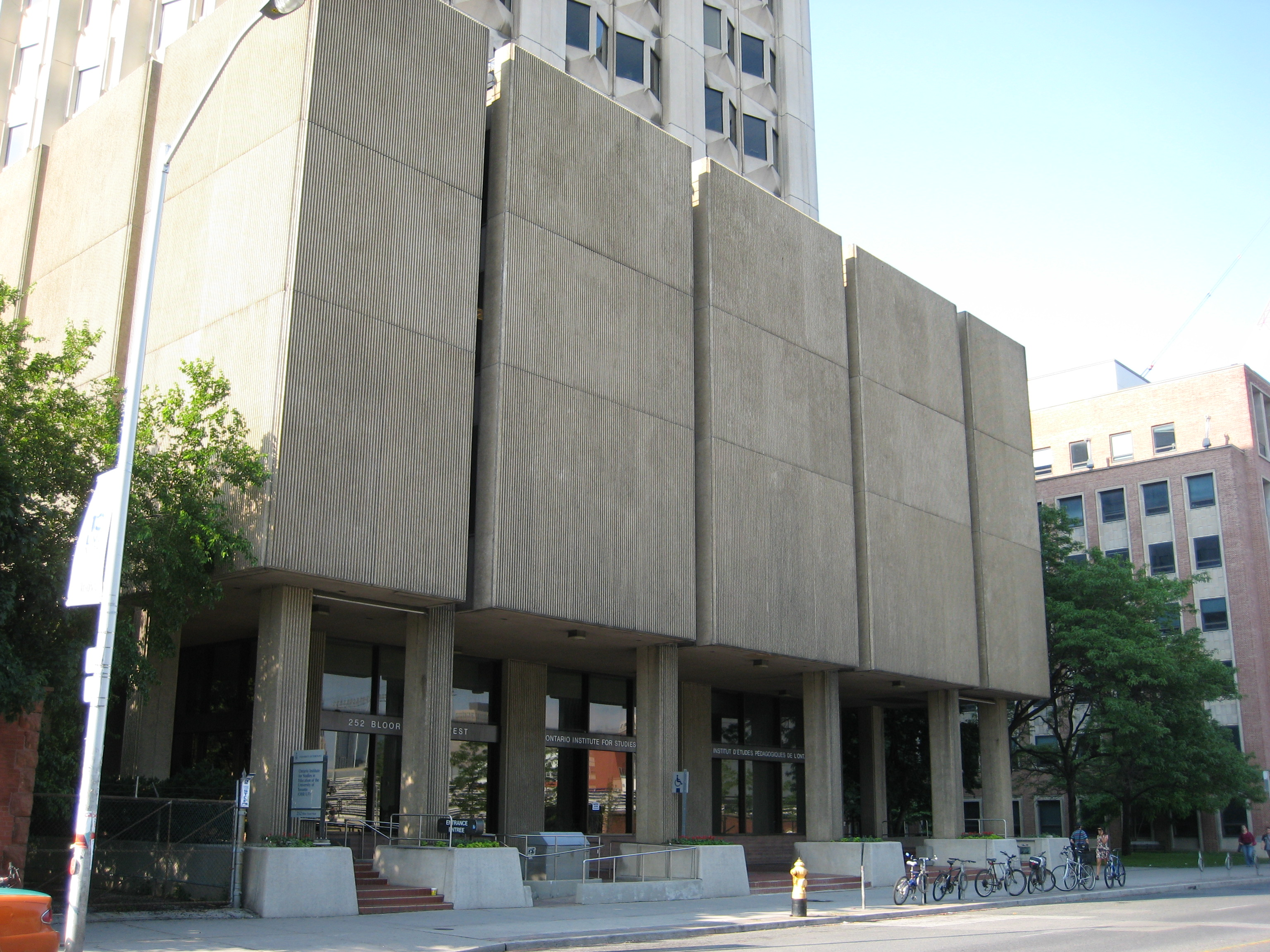
- Other name: OISE
- Type: Public teachers' college
- Established: 1847: Provincial Normal School (1847–1979); 1848: Toronto Model School (1848–1941); 1907: Faculty of Education, University of Toronto (1907–1996); 1965: Ontario Institute for Studies in Education (1996–present)
- Parent institution: University of Toronto
- Affiliations: University of Toronto Schools, Jackman Institute of Child Study Laboratory School, AUCC, IALEI, IAU, COU, CIS, CUSID, OUA, OCGS
- Dean: Erica N. Walker
- Location: 252 Bloor Street West, Toronto, Ontario, Canada; 43°40′05″N 79°23′54″W
- Website: oise.utoronto.ca

The Ontario Institute for Studies in Education, commonly known by the acronym OISE (pronounced /ˈɔɪ.ziː/ OY-zee), is the graduate school of education at the University of Toronto.

OISE's main building is located on the St. George campus at 252 Bloor Street West in Toronto, Ontario, directly above the St. George subway station. The OISE-affiliated Jackman Institute of Child Study is situated nearby at 45 Walmer Street. Although it is based on the St. George campus, OISE also offers its language and literacies education program on the University of Toronto's Mississauga campus.

== History ==
OISE traces its origins back to three separate institutions – the Ontario Provincial Normal School, the Faculty of Education at the University of Toronto, and the Ontario Institute for Studies in Education. The Ontario Provincial Normal School was founded in 1847, the Provincial Model School in 1848 (later merged into Normal School), renamed the Toronto Normal School in 1875, and renamed again as the Toronto Teachers' College in 1953. In 1974, the Toronto Teachers' College was recreated as the Ontario Teacher Education College, which was a degree-granting institution. However, with the declining need for teachers, it was closed by the Ontario government in 1979.

The University of Toronto's Faculty of Education also underwent a series of name changes, being known as the Faculty of Education, University of Toronto from 1907 to 1920, the Ontario College of Education from 1920 to 1965, the College of Education, University of Toronto from 1965 to 1972, and again as the Faculty of Education in 1972. The Ontario Institute for Studies in Education itself was founded in 1965 by an act of the Ontario Legislature. OISE's primary objectives were to conduct and disseminate research in the field of education, and to offer graduate-level education courses and degrees. In 1996, the University of Toronto's Faculty of Education merged with OISE to form the Ontario Institute for Studies in Education of the University of Toronto.

In 1965, OISE introduced a masters and doctoral program in adult education. In 1967, OISE introduced the first graduate course in comparative studies in adult education, which was taught by J. R. Kidd.

In 1975, Professor Frank Smith worked with Stephen Rose on the documentary TV programme How Do You Read, which was broadcast by the BBC as part of the Horizon TV series.

In 1979, OISE hosted the founding meeting of the Feminist Party of Canada.

== Academics ==
Through the School of Graduate Studies, OISE offers graduate programs in teaching, psychology, educational theory, history and administration, and Honours Specialist, technical education diploma, and Additional and Principal Qualification programs. Master of Education and Doctor of Education degrees as well as Master of Arts and Doctor of Philosophy degrees are available. Master of Teaching degrees are also offered. OISE also offers a concurrent education program.

As a result of the government's decision to extend teaching degree programs from existing one year into two years province-wide, OISE announced that they would shift towards graduate programs. By 2015, undergraduate teaching programs were eliminated and OISE became an all-graduate school.

== Partnerships ==
OISE is a founding member of the International Alliance of Leading Education Institutes, which is an international organization of premier education institutes whose focus and mandate is to explore educational issues of global consequence, particularly in matters of teacher education and educational policy. IALEI membership is selective, limited, and by invitation only, based on a member's status as both a world-leading institute, including its "strength in breadth and depth of staff with exceptional publications and significant impact", and as a regional/national centre of excellence in teacher education and consonant educational research, amongst other criteria.

== Buildings ==
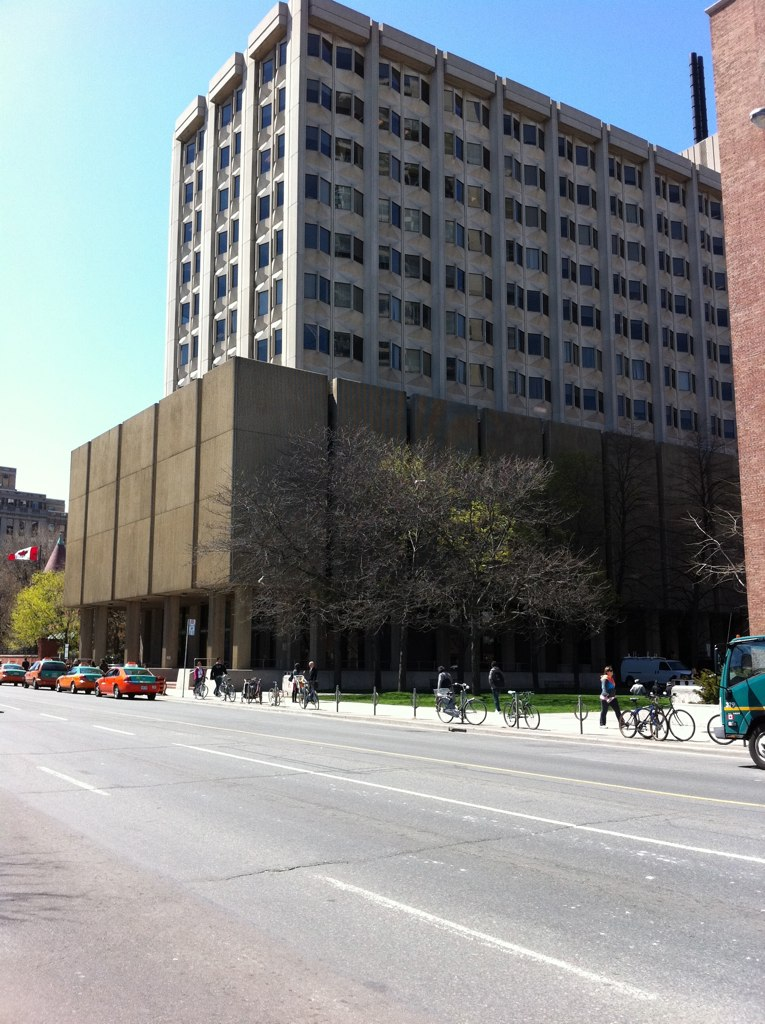
The OISE building in 2023

The OISE Main Complex at 252 Bloor Street West was built from 1966 to 1969/1970 by architect Kenneth Raymond Cooper.

OISE has two other sites:

- 45 Walmer Road – built 1932 as Leighton Goldie McCarthy House, the for residential home was bequeathed to the University of Toronto by Leighton McCarthy upon his death in 1952 and now home to Dr. Eric Jackman Institute of Child Study

Ontario Institute for Studies in Education

- 371 Bloor Street West – built in 1910 for University of Toronto Schools

== Notable staff ==
- Rebecca M. Church (d. 1945), Critic Teacher for Students in Training
- Ivor Wynne, director of intramural athletics and physical education department teacher in the 1940s

== Notable alumni ==
- Arthur Meighen – former Prime Minister of Canada
- Zanana Akande – former Ontario NDP MPP
- Father David Bauer, Basilian priest, founder of the Canada men's national ice hockey team and inductee into the Hockey Hall of Fame
- Shaun Chen – former TDSB trustee and chair; current Liberal MP
- Mychael Danna
- Crispin Duenas
- Michael Fullan
- Carrianne Leung
- Christina Mitas – PC MPP for Scarborough Centre
- Amanda Parris
- Kathleen Wynne – former Premier and leader of Ontario Liberal Party
- Jillian Roberts
