= Bertha Harmer =

- Born: 2 March 1885; Port Hope, Ontario, Canada
- Died: 14 December 1934 (aged 49); Montreal, Quebec, Canada
- Occupations: nurse, writer and educator

Bertha Harmer (2 March 1885 – 14 December 1934) was a Canadian nurse, writer and educator, known for writing the textbook Textbook of the Principles and Practice of Nursing.

Harmer was born in Port Hope, Ontario, the daughter of a railway carpenter. After finishing high school and working for several years, she earned a nursing degree from the Toronto General Hospital in 1913, and a bachelor's degree in administration and teaching from Teachers College, Columbia University in New York City in 1915.

In 1922, as a nursing teacher at St. Luke's Hospital Training School for Nurses in New York, Harmer published the first edition of her textbook. She joined the faculty of the Yale School of Nursing in 1923, and remained there until 1927; at Yale, she was also First Assistant Superintendent of Nurses at the New Haven Hospital in Connecticut. During this time she also published a second book, Methods and Principles of Teaching the Practice of Nursing.

She left her position at Yale in 1927 for health reasons, but returned to Teachers College where she earned a master's degree. In 1928 she moved to McGill University in Montreal, where she became director of McGill's nursing school. At McGill, in the height of the Great Depression, she had to work hard to prevent the school from closing. By 1934 her health had again become a problem for her; she resigned from McGill, and died that year.

She revised her book twice, publishing a second edition in 1928 and a third edition in 1934. Its publisher, Macmillan, published fourth and fifth editions in 1939 and 1955, adding Virginia Henderson as a second author but keeping Harmer's name because of the popularity of the book.
