= Toronto Normal School =

Former teachers college in Toronto, Canada

Coordinates: 43.659°N 79.379°W

Toronto Normal School (St. James Square)
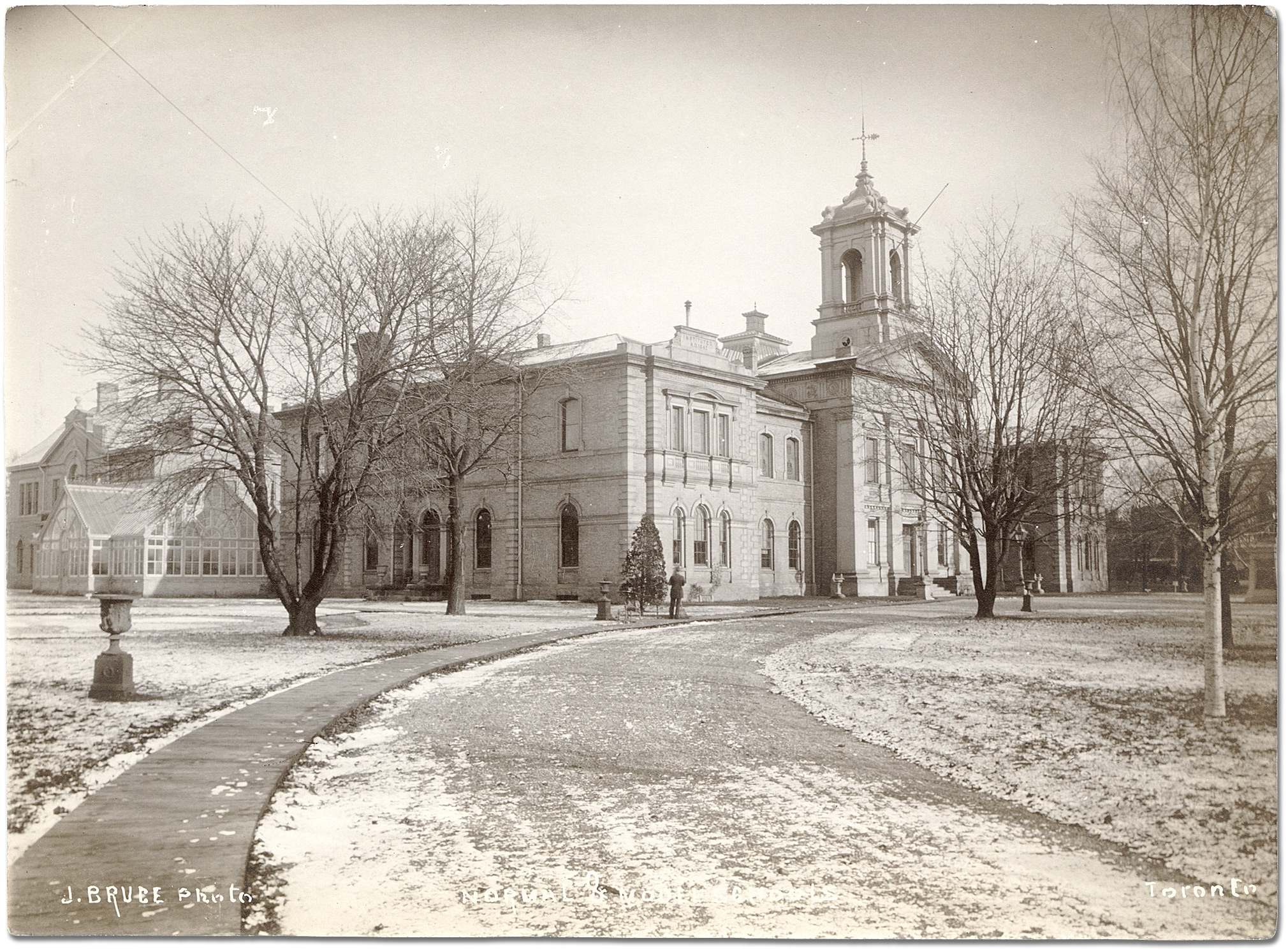
- Toronto Normal School in 1890
- Interactive map of the Toronto Normal School (St. James Square) area
- Former names: Provincial Normal School, Normal School for Upper Canada, Normal School for Ontario
- Alternative names: Ryerson Hall

General information
- Type: Institutional
- Architectural style: Palladian
- Location: Site bounded by Gerrard, Church, Gould and Victoria streets in Toronto, Ontario, Canada
- Construction started: July 2, 1851
- Completed: May 1852
- Demolished: 1958-63
- Owner: Province of Ontario

Design and construction
- Architects: Cumberland and Ridout

The Toronto Normal School was a teachers college in Toronto, Ontario, Canada. Opened in 1847, the normal school was located at Church and Gould streets in central Toronto (after 1852), and was a predecessor to the current Ontario Institute for Studies in Education. The Royal Ontario Museum, OCAD University and the Ontario Agricultural College all originated at the Normal School's campus and the provincial Department of Education was also located there. Officially named St. James Square (and located with the old Toronto St. James Ward), the school became known as "the cradle of Ontario's education system". The school's landmark Gothic-Romanesque building was designed by architects Thomas Ridout and Frederick William Cumberland in 1852. The landmark building was demolished in 1963, but architectural elements of the structure remain on the campus of Toronto Metropolitan University.

The Toronto Normal School was relocated from St. James Square to East York in 1941. In 1953, the Normal School was renamed the Toronto Teachers' College and in 1974 became the Ontario Teacher Education College. In 1979, it was merged into the University of Toronto's Faculty of Education which, in 1996, was merged into the Ontario Institute for Studies in Education.

== Establishment ==
In the 1830s, the authorities in Upper Canada first recognized the need to establish a normal school in the colony to train teachers. It was not until 1846, however, that Egerton Ryerson issued his landmark report entitled "Report on a System of Public Elementary Education for Upper Canada". In that year, the United Province of Canada passed its School Act of 1846, which provided for initial grant of $6,000 for the construction of a building and for an annual subsidy of $6,000 for maintenance of the school.

On November 1, 1847, the Provincial Normal School, as it was first known, opened in the former Government House of Upper Canada. An accompanying Provincial Model School was opened in 1848, in the renovated Government House stables, was created to provide practical training scenarios.

In 1849, the Parliament Buildings in Montreal were burned down in a riot, and the capital of the Province of Canada was relocated to Toronto. The colonial administration required the use of the old Government House, and the Normal School was temporarily displaced to the former Temperance Hall on Temperance Street.

From 1848 to 1941, the Toronto Normal School operated the Toronto Model School, first at Government House, and from 1852 at St. James Square.

== St. James Square ==
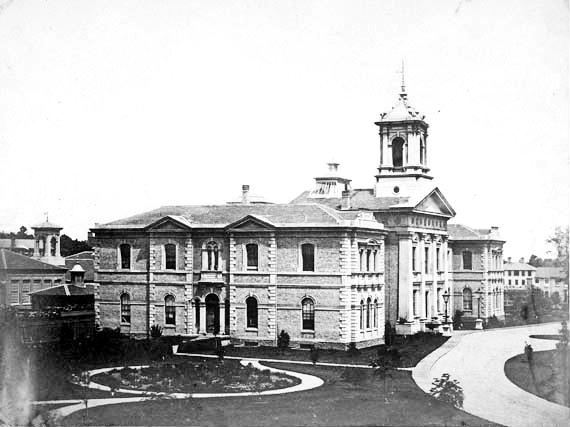
The new Normal School building in 1856

On July 2, 1851, the cornerstone for a new building was laid by Governor General Lord Elgin, and the Normal (and Model) School building opened in May 1852. The new building was designed to accommodate two hundred teachers-in-training and six hundred pupils. It was situated on a 3.2 hectare (8 acres) site, bounded by Gerrard, Church, Gould and Victoria streets, which Ryerson had acquired for the Normal School at a cost of 4500 pounds. The site was described in 1858 as follows: "The situation is a very beautiful one, being considerably elevated above the business parts of the city, and commanding a fine view of the bay, peninsula and lake."

The property became known as St. James Square, and was soon used for more than teacher training purposes. A 2-acre (8,100 m^{2}) plot was set aside for a botanical garden, with another 3 acres (12,000 m^{2}) reserved for agricultural experiments. The agricultural work on the site prompted the founding of the Ontario Agricultural College in 1874, which later became the University of Guelph.

Ryerson wanted the Normal School to be a focal point of the development of arts and education in Upper Canada. In 1857, Canada's first publicly funded museum, the Museum of Natural History and Fine Arts, was established within the Normal School building, with its initial collection based largely on Egerton Ryerson's own artwork, statuary and scientific apparatus acquired during his trips to Europe. In 1896, the archaeological and ethnographic collections of the Canadian Institute Museum of Toronto, headed by David Boyle, were transferred to the Normal School as the Ontario Provincial Museum (or also as Provincial Museum of Ontario). Boyle was also involved with the archaeological collections of the Ministry of Education (Ontario Archaeological Museum) and remained Ontario Provincial Museum's curator and later its superintendent until his death in 1911. The museum later evolved into the Royal Ontario Museum.

The Ontario Society of Artists, founded in 1872, used the Normal School as its headquarters. The Society operated an art school on the St. James Square site, which eventually became OCAD University.

The building also housed the Province's Department of Education. These various activities at St. James Square lead to its designation as "the cradle of Ontario's education system".

With the construction of its new building, the name of the Normal School was changed to the Normal School for Upper Canada. Upon Confederation in 1867, it was renamed the Normal School for Ontario. The opening of the Ottawa Normal School in 1875 prompted a further renaming to Toronto Normal School. It was known by this name for 78 years, when the Government of Ontario eliminated the "normal school" nomenclature for its teacher training institutions, and the school became the Toronto Teachers' College in 1953.

== Transition to Toronto Teachers' College ==
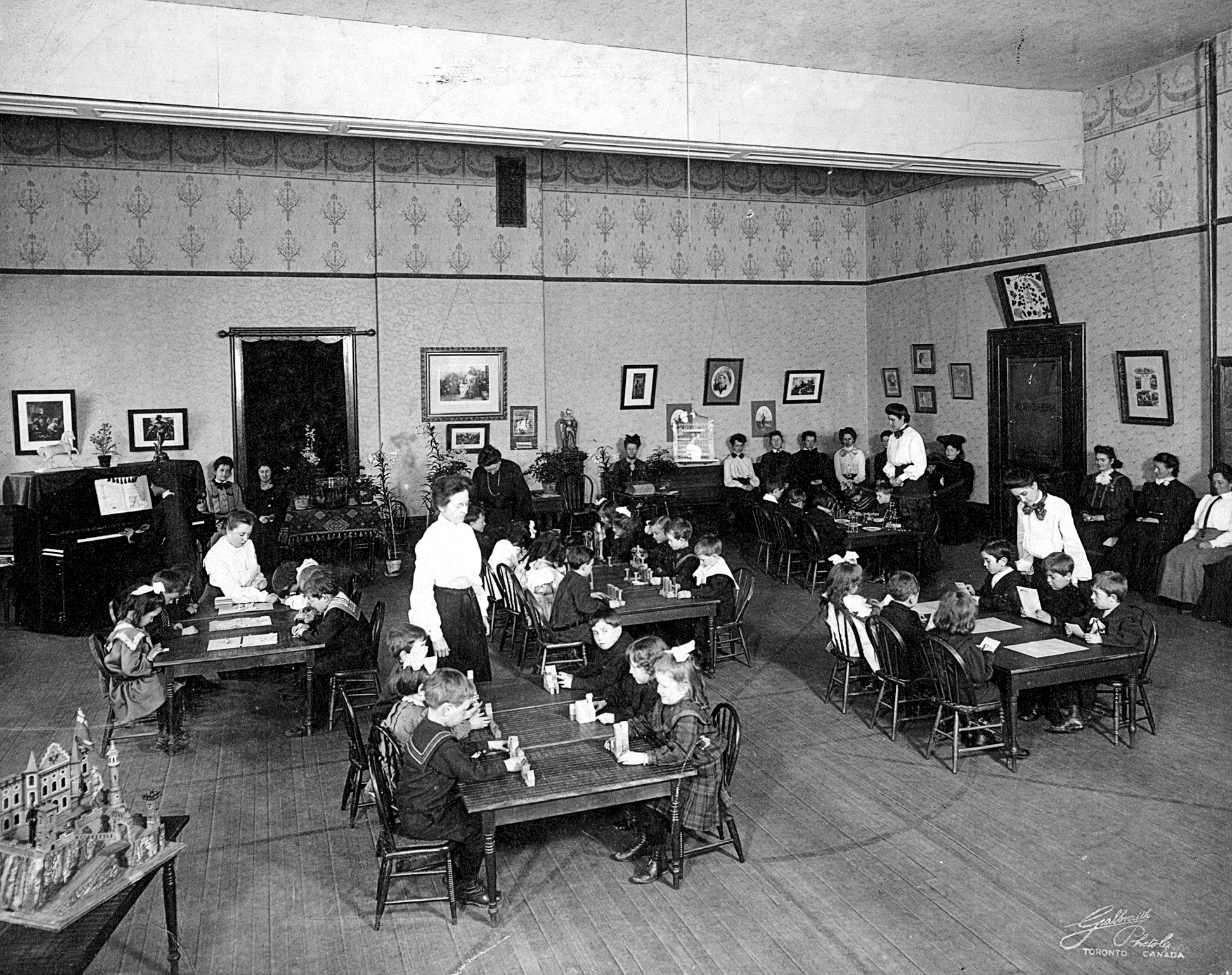
Student teachers in a kindergarten class at St. James Square in 1898

As it had almost a century before, turmoil again led to the eviction of the Normal School from its facilities. Due to the demands of the Second World War, the Normal School was forced to relocate to the former Earl Kitchener Public School at Pape and Mortimer Avenues in nearby East York in 1941; the model school was dissolved. St. James Square became the No. 6 Initial Training Centre for the Royal Canadian Air Force, and a number of barracks and other auxiliary buildings were constructed on the site.

After the war, the St. James Square property was given to the new Toronto Training and Re-establishment Institute in 1945, a joint-venture of the federal and provincial governments to train ex-servicemen and women. The institute became the Ryerson Institute of Technology in 1948, and would ultimately become today's Toronto Metropolitan University. The Normal School building was renamed Ryerson Hall in 1948, with the founding of the Ryerson Institute. The beginnings of the new institution were inauspicious: one local media report described the new Ryerson Institute as consisting of "a dirty, old three-storey building the Normal School building surrounded by asbestos-sided shacks the war-time buildings."

The Normal School was renamed the Toronto Teachers' College in 1953 and moved, in 1955, to a facility at 951 Carlaw Avenue in East York, now the site of the Centennial College Story Arts Centre.

In the 1960s and 1970s, Ontario phased out standalone teachers' colleges and integrated teacher education into universities.

=== Ontario Teacher Education College ===
In 1974, Toronto Teachers' College was reorganized reorganized as the Ontario Teacher Education College (OTEC), a provincially operated, degree-granting institution intended to modernize teacher preparation in Ontario.

OTEC became the last remaining government-run teachers' college in Ontario after most teacher education programs had been transferred to universities during the late 1960s and early 1970s. The college offered postgraduate teacher education programs and was intended to bridge the transition from the traditional normal school system to university-based faculties of education.

Declining enrolment and a reduced demand for teachers in Ontario during the 1970s led the provincial government to close the Ontario Teacher Education College in 1979. Its programs and functions were merged into the University of Toronto Faculty of Education, which later became integrated with the Ontario Institute for Studies in Education (OISE).

The closure of OTEC marked the end of Ontario's historic normal school and teachers' college system, which had begun with the establishment of the Provincial Normal School in Toronto in 1847.

== Names ==
The school's name changed several times over its lifetime:

- Provincial Normal School (1847–1852)
- Normal School for Upper Canada (1852–1867)
- Normal School for Ontario (1867–1875)
- Toronto Normal School (1875–1953)
- Toronto Teachers' College (1953–1974)
- Ontario Teacher Education College (1974–1979)

== Demolition of St. James Square buildings ==
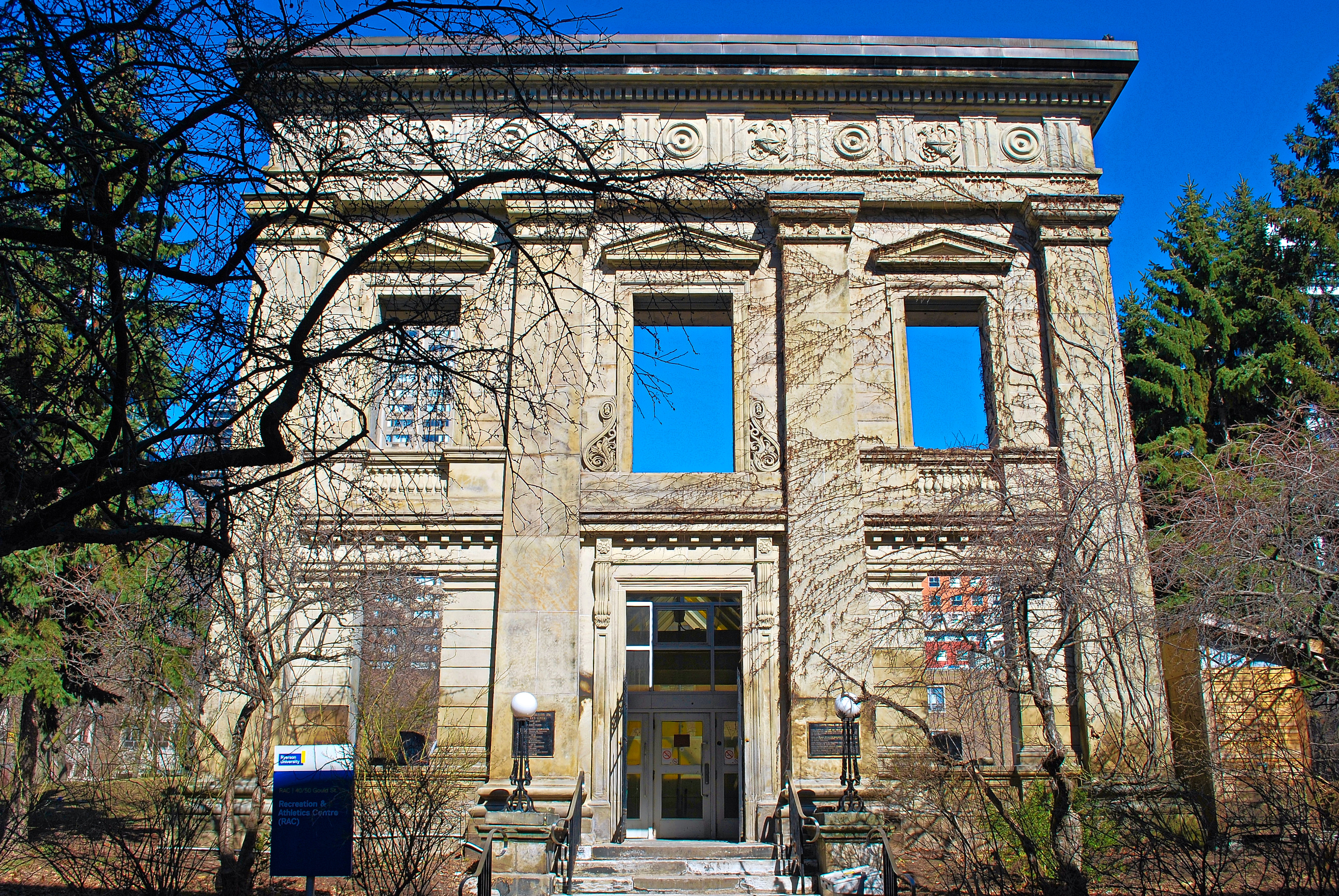
The façade of the Normal School in 2019

The growing Ryerson Institute soon outgrew the ageing St. James Square buildings. The former Normal School building and surrounding structures were demolished between 1958 and 1963, and replaced by the Kerr Hall quadrangle building. A two-storey portion of the Normal School front façade was preserved (later named "the Arch") and currently forms the entrance to the Toronto Metropolitan University Recreation and Athletics Centre.

== Notable alumni ==
- Rebecca M. Church (d. 1945), president, Imperial Order Daughters of the Empire

== See also ==
- List of oldest buildings and structures in Toronto
