= Consumers' Gas Building =

Canadian commercial building

Coordinates: 43.65047°N 79.376061°W

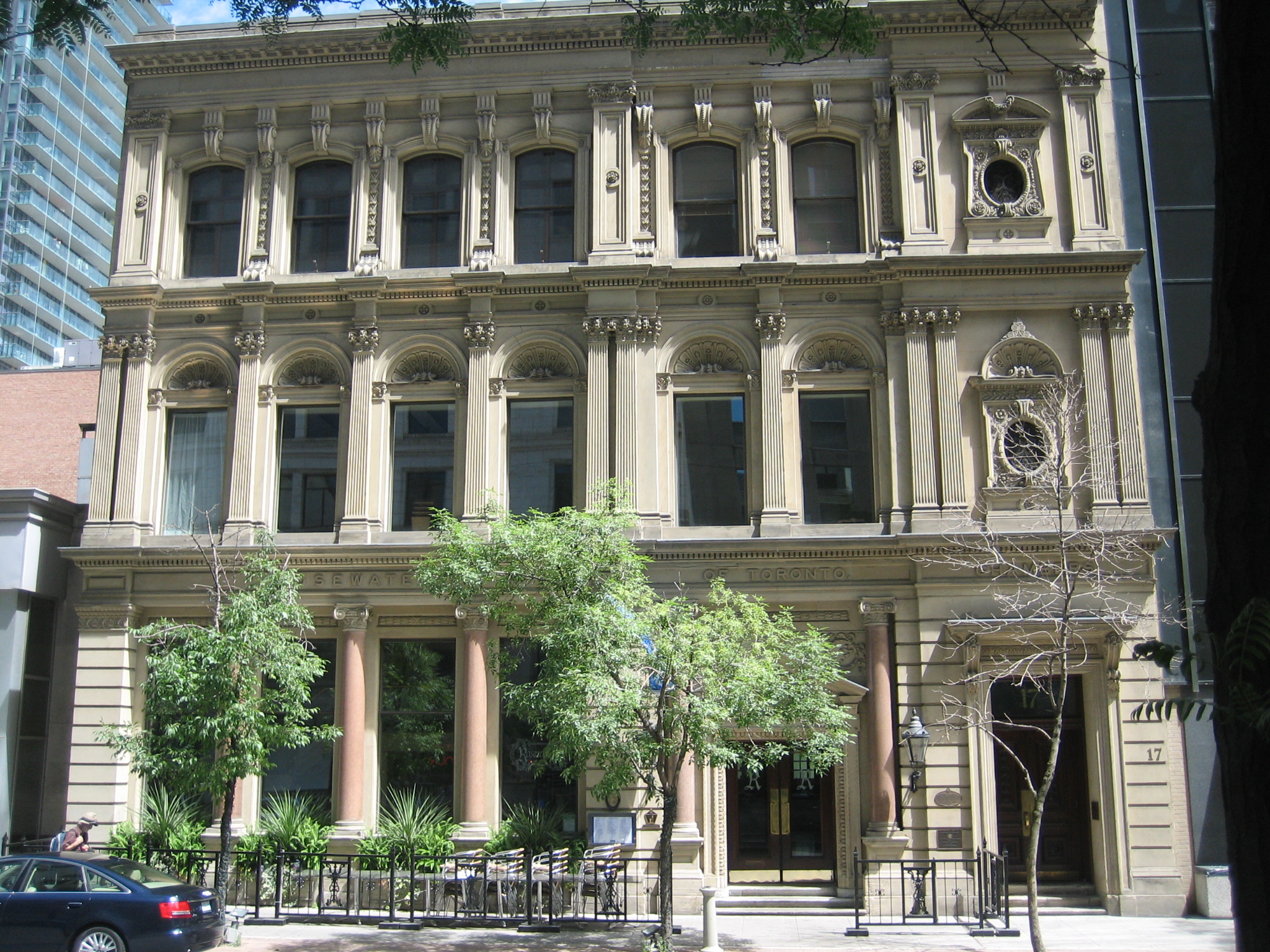
Consumers' Gas Building: Dick's unified façade of 1899

The Italianate/neo-Renaissance style Consumers' Gas Building at 19 Toronto Street in Toronto, Ontario, Canada was first built in 1852, as the Consumers Gas company's head office. The company remained in this location for 125 years. The 19 Toronto Street façade, designed by David B. Dick, was added to the north in 1876, and the unified façade treating the two structures as one was built by Dick, 1899. The last renovations were completed in 1983 by Stone & Kohn architects for new owners, Counsel Trust Company.
