= Jewish cemetery, Mariupol =

Cemetery in Mariupol, Ukraine

Mariupol Jewish Cemetery
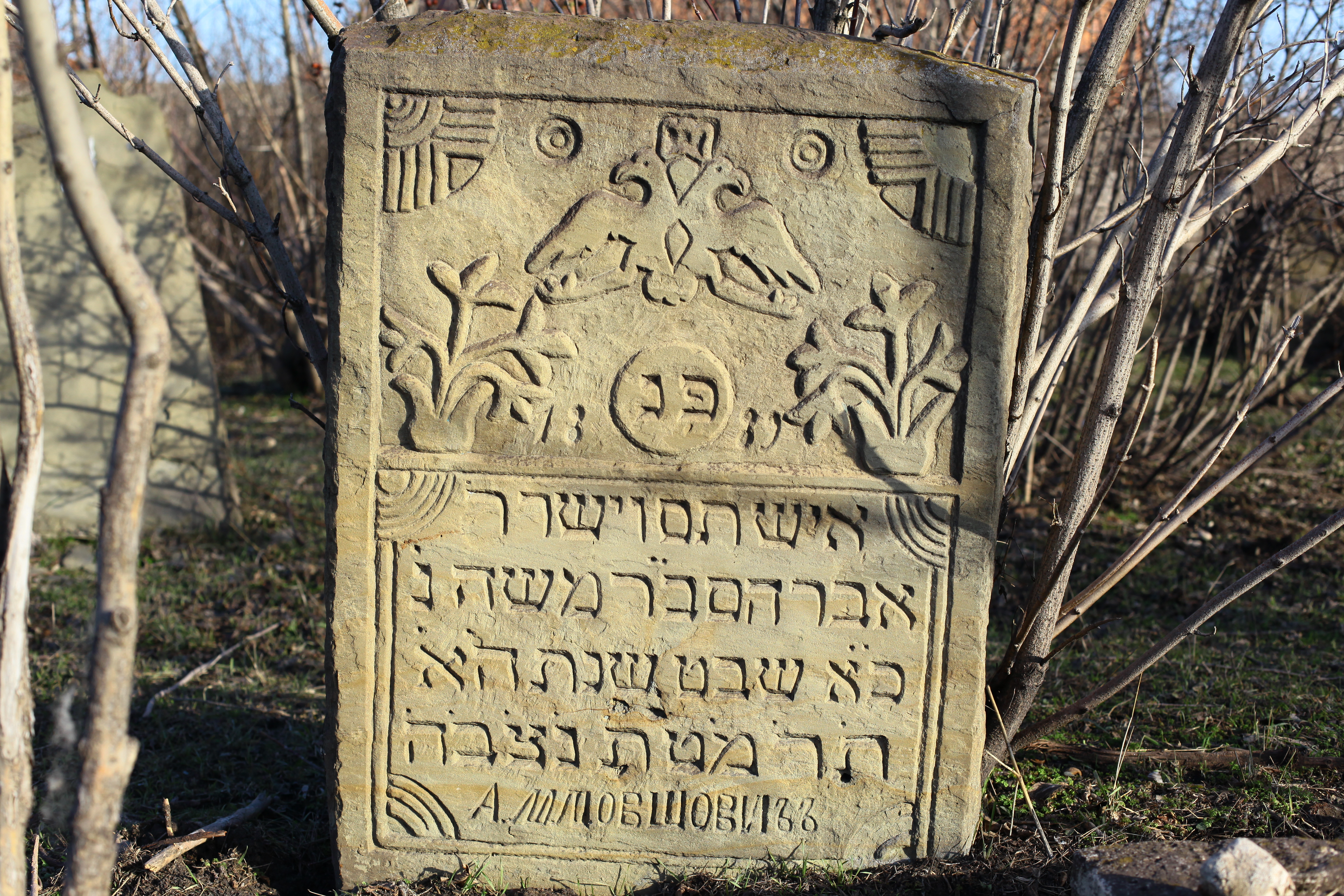

Details
- Established: 1832
- Location: Mariupol, Ukraine
- Type: Jewish cemetery

The Mariupol Jewish Cemetery is one of the largest Jewish cemeteries in Ukraine. Located in Mariupol, the Jewish necropolis was established in 1832 and closed 1970.

The cemetery is filled with monuments dedicated to notable personas such as commerciants, economists and others. Many of the markers are simple, others are elaborately carved and richly decorated. Large mausoleums appear in styles ranging from Egyptian revival to Art Deco.
