= Izrael Poznański =

Polish industrialist (1833–1900)

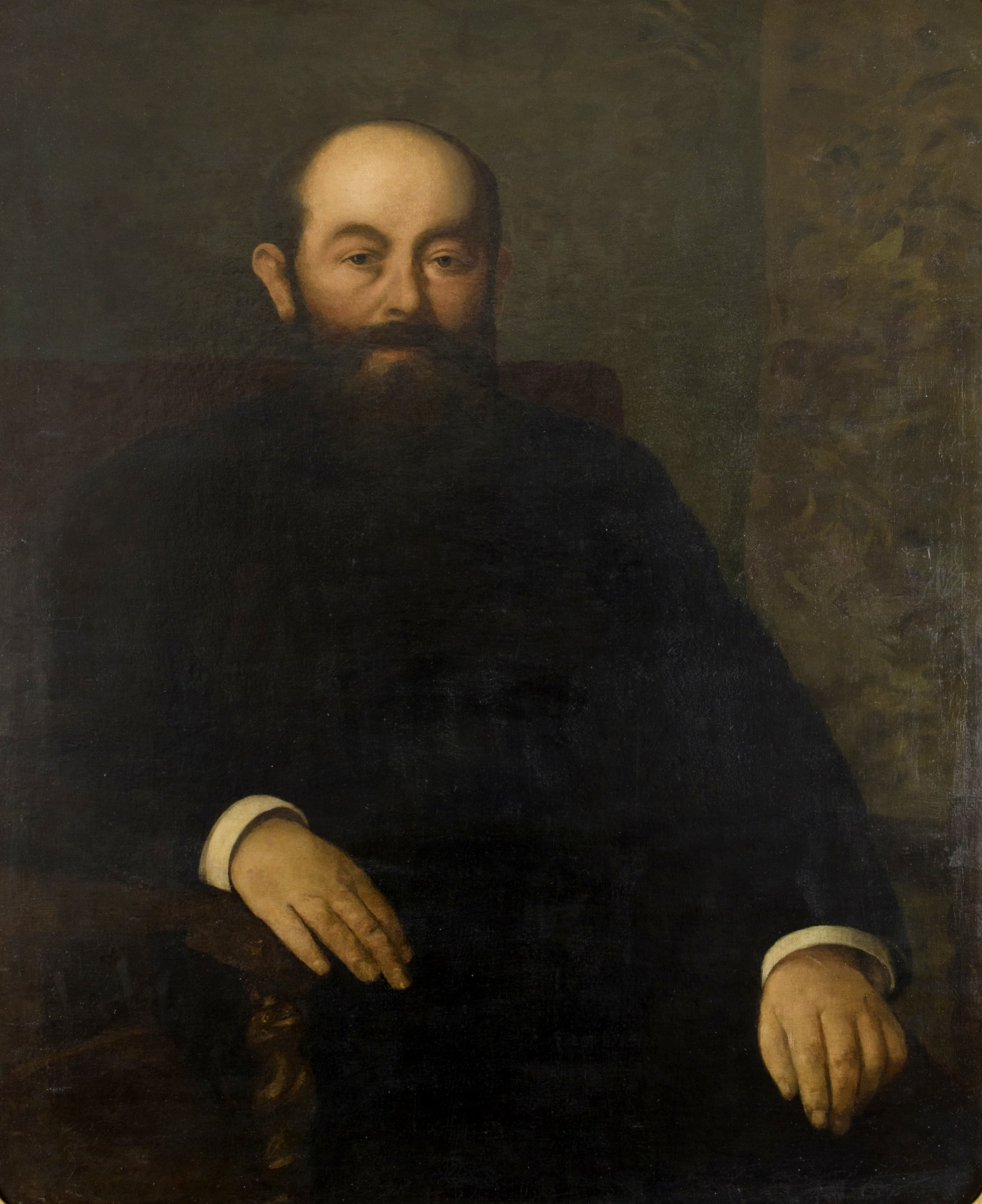
- Stanisław Heyman, Portrait of Izrael Kalman Poznański (1891)
- Born: August 25, 1833; Aleksandrów, Kingdom of Poland, Russian Empire
- Died: April 28, 1900 (aged 66); Łódź, Kingdom of Poland, Russian Empire
- Occupation: Textile manufacturer
- Years active: 1852–1900
- Known for: Manufaktura, Poznański Palace

Izrael Kalman Poznański (25 August 1833–28 April 1900) was a Polish-Jewish businessman, textile magnate and philanthropist in Łódź, Congress Poland (part of the Russian Empire), and the husband of Eleonora Hertz Poznańska. The mausoleum of Izrael and his wife, Eleonora Hertz, on the New Jewish Cemetery has been described as "probably the largest Jewish grave monument in the world". The mausoleum and mosaic covering the inside of the dome were restored in 1993.

Together with Ludwik Geyer and Karol Scheibler, he was counted among the three "Kings of Cotton" in Łódź. His complex of mills in Łódź, Poland, have been turned into the 69-hectare (170-acre) Manufaktura mixed-use development, including a mall, 3 museums, a multiplex cinema, a hotel, and restaurants.

== Life ==
=== Youth ===
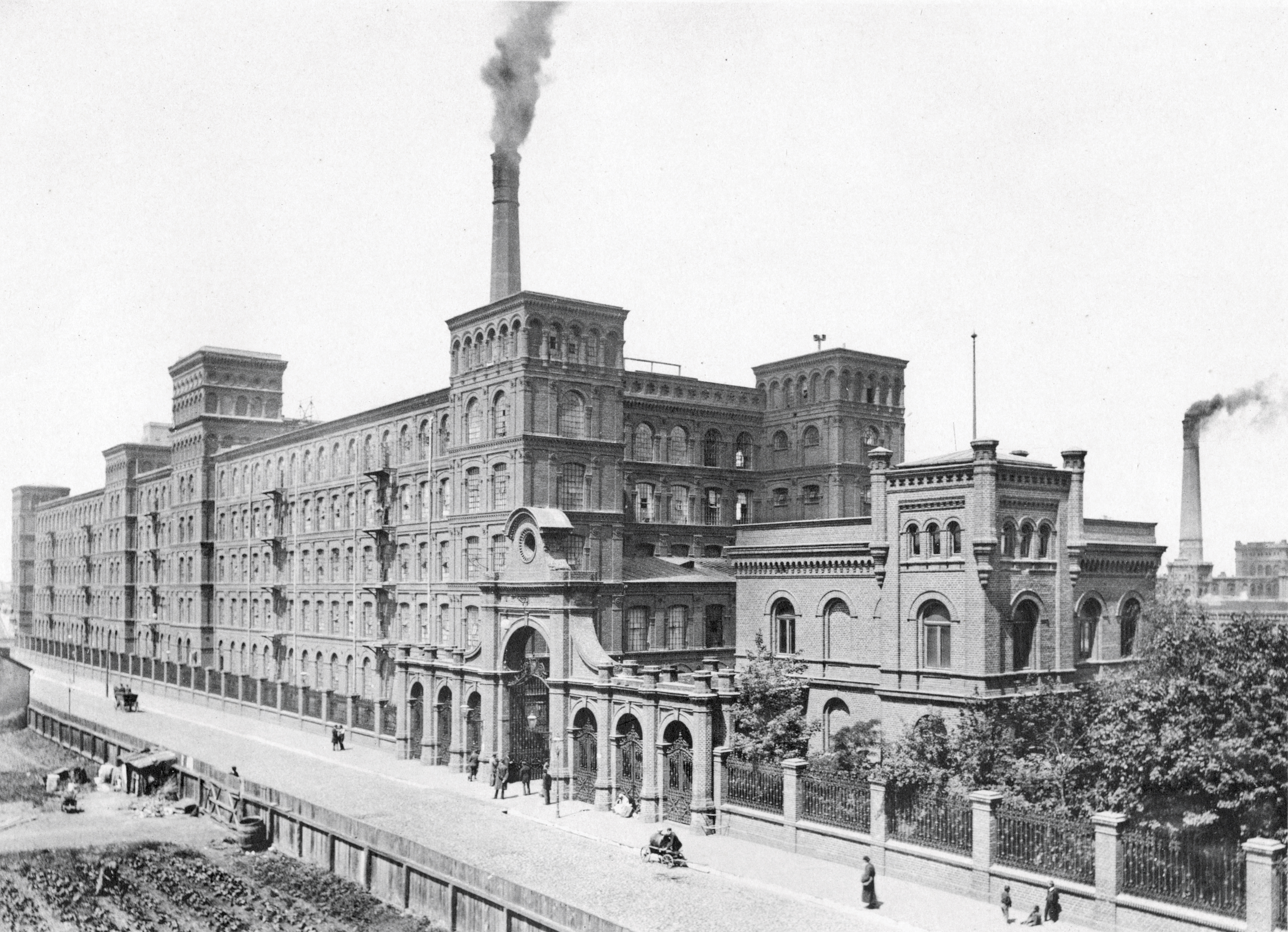
Poznański's cotton mills in Łódź, 1895.

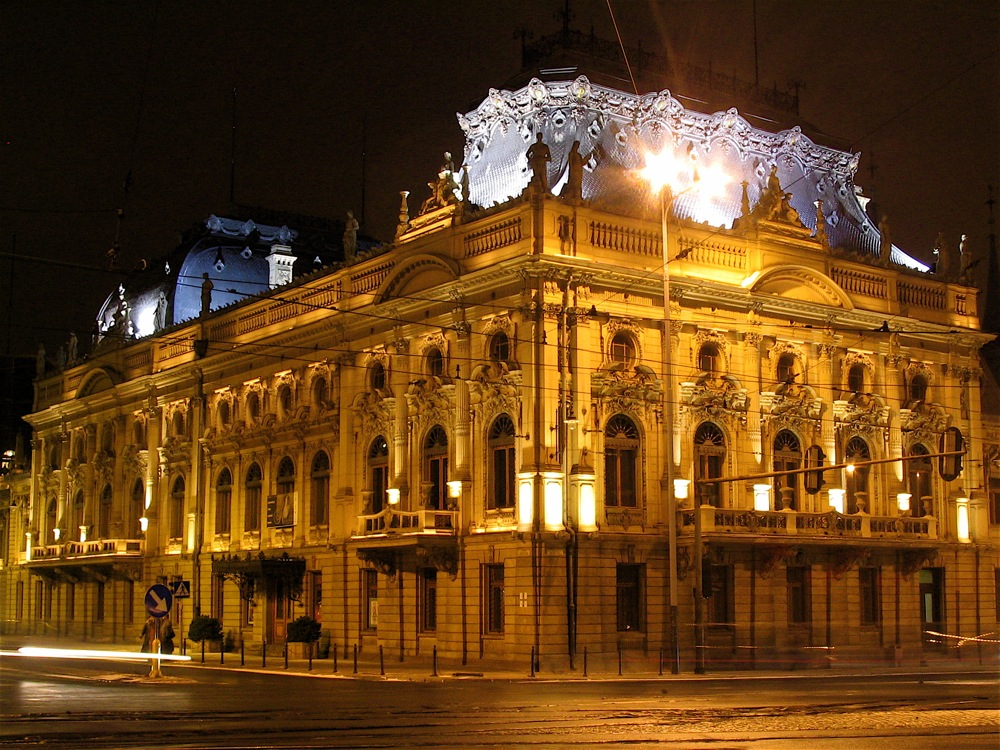
Poznański Palace, next door to the mills, as seen in 2005.

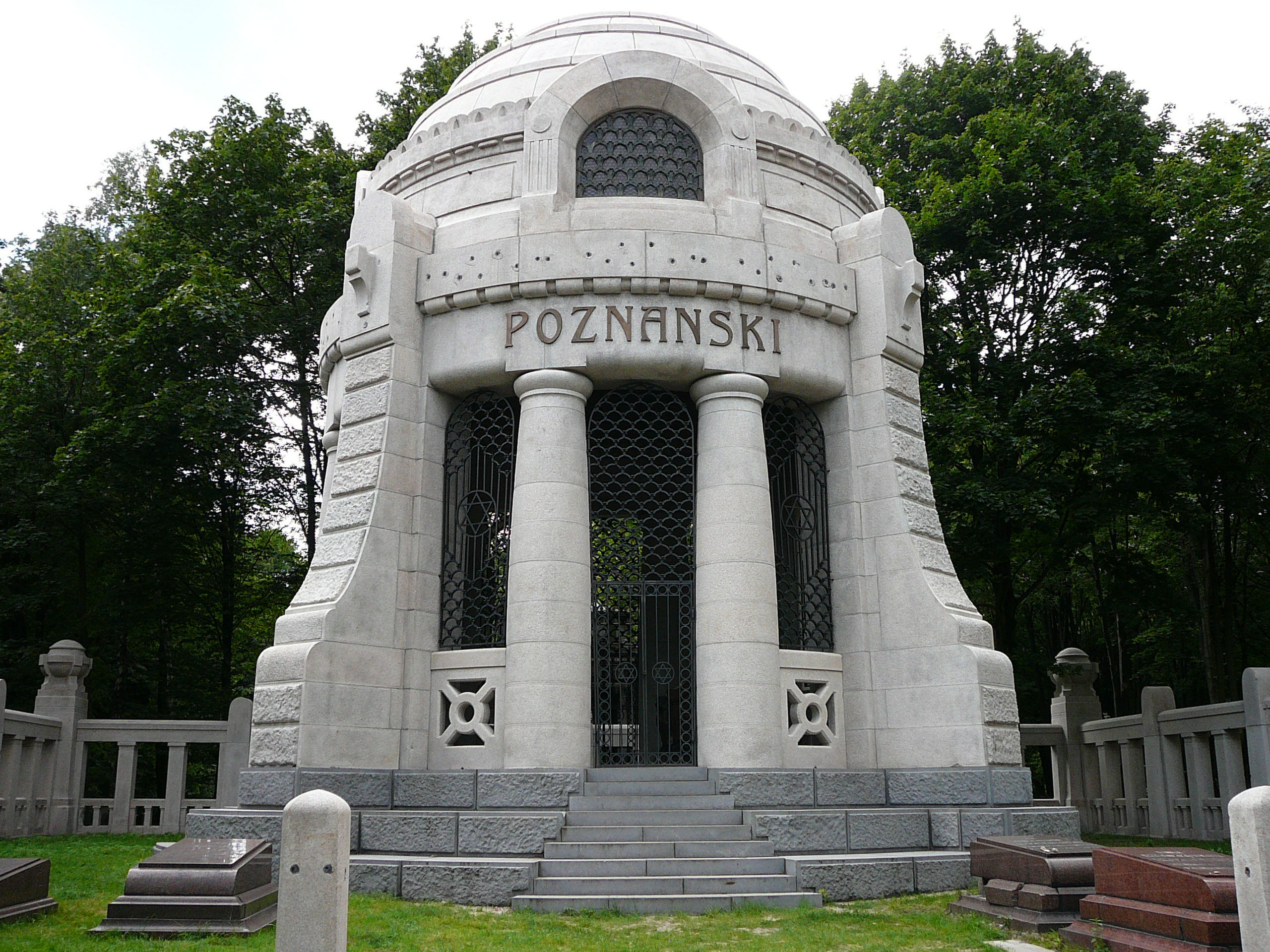
The Poznański mausoleum in the Jewish Cemetery in Łodz.

Poznański was the grandson of the merchant Izaak Poznański from the town of Kowal in Kuyavia and the youngest son of the merchant Kalman (who was given the surname Poznański) and Małka Lubińska. In 1825, the 40-year-old Kalman Poznański, with his wife, children, farmhand and servant, settled in Aleksandrów Łódzki. In 1834, the family, now quite wealthy, moved from Aleksandrów to Łódź, where the father acquired the right to trade in textiles, notably cotton and linen, and built the first two-story tenement house in the Old Town, where he also established a store selling fabrics and spices.

In Łódź, Izrael Poznański graduated from elementary school and the so-called junior high school. The future multi-millionaire entrepreneur learned from scratch. As a teenager, he collected scrap material using a rickety cart pulled by a run-down horse (later, to enhance his rags-to-riches tale, the rich man claimed that he did not have a horse at the time, and that he instead harnessed dogs to the cart). At the age of seventeen, in 1851, he married Leonia Hertz, the daughter of Mojżesz Hertz, a wealthy merchant from Warsaw. Izrael was described then as a "master of the weaving profession" bringing an estate worth 500 rubles to the marriage. His wife, Leonia, brought him a dowry selling goods in Warsaw.

=== Career ===
In December 1852, Izrael Poznański took over the management of the family business from his father, and gradually expanded it over the next half-century. In 1859 the gross output of his plant was valued at 6,000 zlotys; by 1868, this had increased to 23,000 rubles. By 1871 Poznański had begun buying up plots at 17–23 Ogrodowa Street in order to build a new grand industrial complex; the following year, the first factory facility was erected on the site, a high-output cotton mill with some 200 mechanical looms.

Subsequently, Poznański rapidly expanded his plant, as described by the following timeline:

- 1874–75 - enlargement of the weaving mill, construction of a bleacher and a finishing plant
- 1877 - construction of a huge building for a spinning mill
- 1878 - own mechanical workshop
- 1880 - factory hospital (St. Joseph Hospital, currently named after Radliński) at ul. Drewnowska 75
- 1885–90 - "Szpital Orozakonnych", currently the Department of Endocrinology of the University Clinical Hospital no. WAM - Central Veterans Hospital at ul. 1/3 Sterling
- 1887 - dye shop, finishing shop and central boiler room
- 1890, 1895 - other weaving mills
- 1893 - iron foundry
- 1895–1897 - large cotton warehouses at the Old Cemetery

This impressive complex (shot by master Polish photographer Bronisław Wilkoszewski for his album Views of the City of Łódź in 1895 and illustrated here) still stands. Built nearly entirely of orange brick, it is entered from the street through a large gate resembling a grandiose triumphal arch. To the right behind the entry is the building housing the offices of the company directors, which preserves its original marble interior. The main building (dating from 1877–78) stretches 170 meters to the left behind the entrance. The corner towers contain staircase, ventilation shafts, and water tanks for fire relief. It originally contained five-aisled production halls, and functioned as an industrial complex until World War II before being nationalized under the Communist regime. After some years of neglect it has now been transformed into a multiplex cinema, shopping center, and hotel, called Manufaktura. Poznański's own palatial residence, next door, also still stands.

On October 29, 1889, the family business was transformed into a joint-stock company, like other cotton enterprises in Łódź. The official name of the plants was Towarzystwo Akcyjne Wyrobów Cottonowych IK Poznańskiego in Łódź (Poznański Cotton Products Joint Stock Company in Łódź). The expanding plants of Poznański employed more and more workers over the years: in 1865, there were some 70 workers; by 1879, this had grown to 426 workers; and in 1906, the firm employed around 6,800 people.

In 1883, a strike broke out at Poznański's factory as a result of deteriorating working conditions. At that time, the average workday for a laborer lasted 16 hours, from 5:00 a.m. to 9:00 p.m. That year, in addition, Izrael Poznański mandated that employees also work on public holidays, beginning on August 15, the Feast of Our Lady of Herbs. Any employee who disobeyed was fined up to 3 rubles. Protesters were subdued by the police and a group of Cossacks, and in all 50 people were removed from the factory. In February 1884, Poznański fined the workers who protested against working on the Feast of Our Lady of Candlemas. One of the workers was assaulted. In 1891, the report of the factory inspector documented that Poznański paid the lowest wages of any industrialist in Łódź, and the penalties that his weavers faced if they broke regulations were the most severe. During the Łódź revolt in 1892, Poznański set up a temporary investigative office at his factory, where several striking workers were humiliated, beaten, and then fired from the factory without proof of their guilt.

In 1884, Izrael Poznański purchased the property of Nieznanowice in the then-Włoszczowa district, where he built a starch factory to supply his textile factories in Łódź. The new plant employed 140 workers. He also built a two-story palace nearby modeled on neoclassical mansions. In the summer of 1889, a fire destroyed this factory completely, and losses in uninsured movable property were estimated at 60,000 rubles. In 1910, the Poznańskis sold the palace and the rest of the property of Niepanowice to the Karski family.

Izrael Poznański died on April 28, 1900, and two days later he was buried in the family tomb in the New Jewish Cemetery in Łódź. At the time of his death, he had amassed a fortune of 11 million rubles. World War I brought great losses to Poznański's enterprise. Successive generations managed the company until the 1930s, when the indebted business was taken over by Banca Commerciale Italiana.

=== Philanthropy ===
A clear change can be observed during Poznański's life story: initially he was known as a ruthless employer, neglecting the safety of employees. In his factories, there were numerous accidents resulting in disability or death. However, towards the end of his life he became involved in charity, building orphanages, schools for the poor and hospitals. He contributed in financing the iconostasis at the Alexander Nevsky Cathedral in Łódź, for which he was awarded the Order of St. Stanislaus by the Imperial Russian authorities. In March 1895 he was awarded the Order of Saint Anna. In 1891, he financed a terracotta floor for the Church of the Assumption of the Blessed Virgin Mary, on pl. Kościelny in Łódź, made by the German company Villeroy & Boch from Mettlach. In the mid-1890s, he also financed ⅓ the cost of building a large organ in the church. On February 18, 1895, he notarised 100,000 rubles to transform the Higher School of Crafts in Łódź into a technical school. In 1899-1900 he was the president of the Łódź Jewish Charity Society, which he founded, among other organizations.

== Family ==
Poznański and his wife Leonia had seven children:

- 4 sons - Ignacy, Herman, Karol and Maurycy
- 3 daughters - Anna (Ajdla, later wife of Jakub Hertz), Joanna Natalia (later wife of Zygmunt Lewiński), and Felicja (Fajga, died in infancy)

== Cultural Depictions ==
- The figures of Max Ashkenazi from the novel The Brothers Ashkenazi by Israel Joshua Singer and Shaya Mendelsohn from The Promised Land by Władysław Reymont are partly modeled on Izrael Poznański.
- In May 2016, the Grand Theater in Łódź announced a competition to write an opera about Izrael Poznański, Man from Manufaktura to a libretto by Małgorzata Sikorska-Miszczuk. On January 5, 2017, the first public performance of competition excerpts from the opera took place. The winner of the competition was Rafał Janiak. The world premiere of his work, originally planned for November 2018, took place on February 2, 2019.

== See also ==
- Izrael Poznański's Palace
