= Jewish cemetery of Siret =

Coordinates: 47°57′04″N 26°04′24″E

- Interactive map of Jewish cemetery of Siret

Details
- Established: 16th century
- Type: Jewish

The Jewish cemetery of Siret is a cemetery in Siret, Romania. It is considered to be one of the oldest Jewish cemeteries in Eastern Europe. The oldest inscriptions indicate that the cemetery might have been in use around the year 1500. The cemetery stayed in use until the 19th century.

In 2015, the cemetery was added to the list of historic monuments of Suceava County.
