= Jewish Cemetery, Łódź =

Jewish cemetery in Poland

Łódź Jewish Cemetery
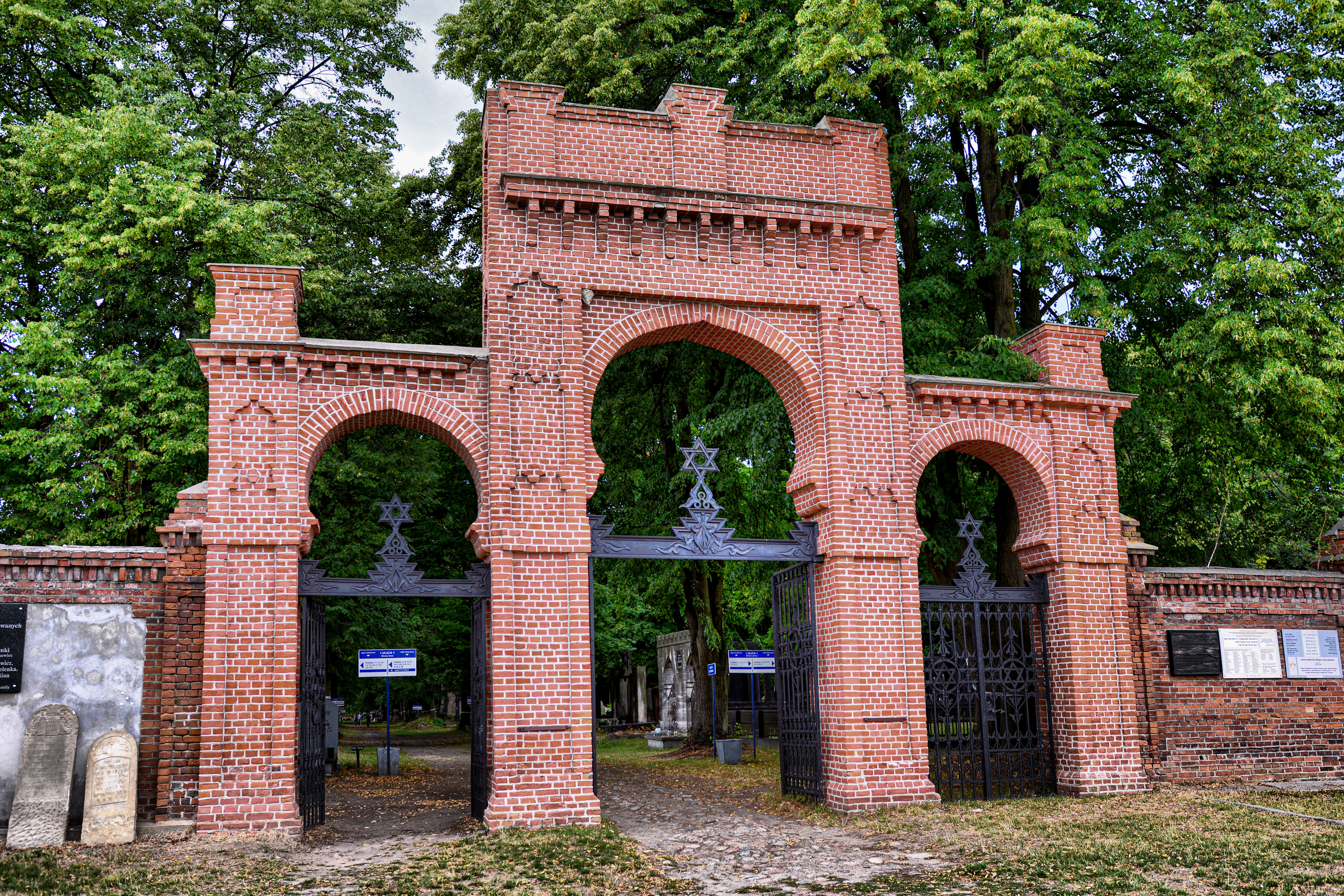
- Internal gate leading to the cemetery, August 2019
- Interactive map of Łódź Jewish Cemetery

Details
- Established: 1892
- Location: Łódź, Poland
- Coordinates: 51°47′46″N 19°28′55″E
- Type: Jewish cemetery
- Size: 44 ha
- No. of graves: 180,000–230,000
- Find a Grave: Łódź Jewish Cemetery

The Łódź Jewish Cemetery, also known as the New Jewish Cemetery, was once the largest Jewish cemetery in Poland and one of the largest in the world. Located in the city of Łódź on Bracka Street, the necropolis was opened in 1892 and occupies around 44 hectares of land. The cemetery contains from 180,000 to 230,000 marked graves, as well as mass graves of victims of the Litzmannstadt Ghetto and the Holocaust. From 1893 to 1896, the basic construction of the necropolis was completed under the supervision of well-known architect Adolf Zeligson.

The circular access is provided by the gate from the southern side on the axis of Abram Cukier Street, which is an extension Chryzantem Street. Pedestrian access is possible from the east through a gate in the wall stretching along Zmienna Street. The composition of the foundation is based on the arrangement of two mutually perpendicular axes. The first one leads from the main gate to the square in front of the pre-funeral house. Alongside it, there were once buildings associated with the functioning of the necropolis, in addition to the pre-burial house, this complex included a synagogue, a residential house for cemetery service, a water tower, a mikveh and other minor construction facilities.

Today over a hundred of historical gravesites have been declared historical monuments and are in various stages of restoration. The mausoleum of Izrael Poznański is perhaps the largest Jewish tombstone in the world and the only one containing decorative mosaic.

The cemetery continues to function as a Jewish burial site.

== History ==
The cemetery was established on Bracka and Zmienna Streets and following its creation in 1892, it was the largest Jewish necropolis in the Europe. The decision was made to established a Jewish gravesite when residents of the surrounding neighbourhoods refused to allow the expansion of the old cemetery on Wesoła Street, which contained over 3,000 graves. An influential industrialist and factory owner Izrael Poznański donated the first 10.5 hectares of land towards the cemetery's establishment. The outbreak of a cholera epidemic in 1892 forced the Tsarist authorities of Congress Poland to accept the construction. Thus, the first people buried there in the winter of 1892 were approximately 700 cholera victims. In 1893, an estimated 1,139 men and women were buried at the new cemetery.

The Beit Tahara (Funeral Home) was funded by Mina Dobrzyńska Konsztat in 1896 and completed in 1898. In 1900, Albert Cukier purchased additional acres of land and greatly expanded the necropolis. During this time, several houses for cemetery workers and a wooden synagogue were built. World War I brought severe destruction and many tombstones were badly damaged. Its renovation was supported financially by city's industrialists. By 1925, the original wooden fence surrounding the cemetery's borders was replaced by a red brick wall that still stands to this day. All tombstones in the cemetery face east and in the 19th century the majority of them were painted in different colours.

== Gallery ==
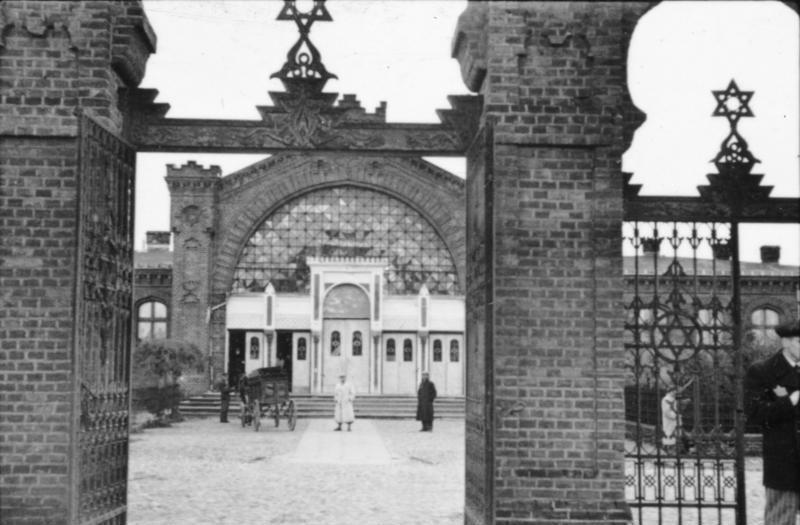
Beit Tahara – funeral home in 1940

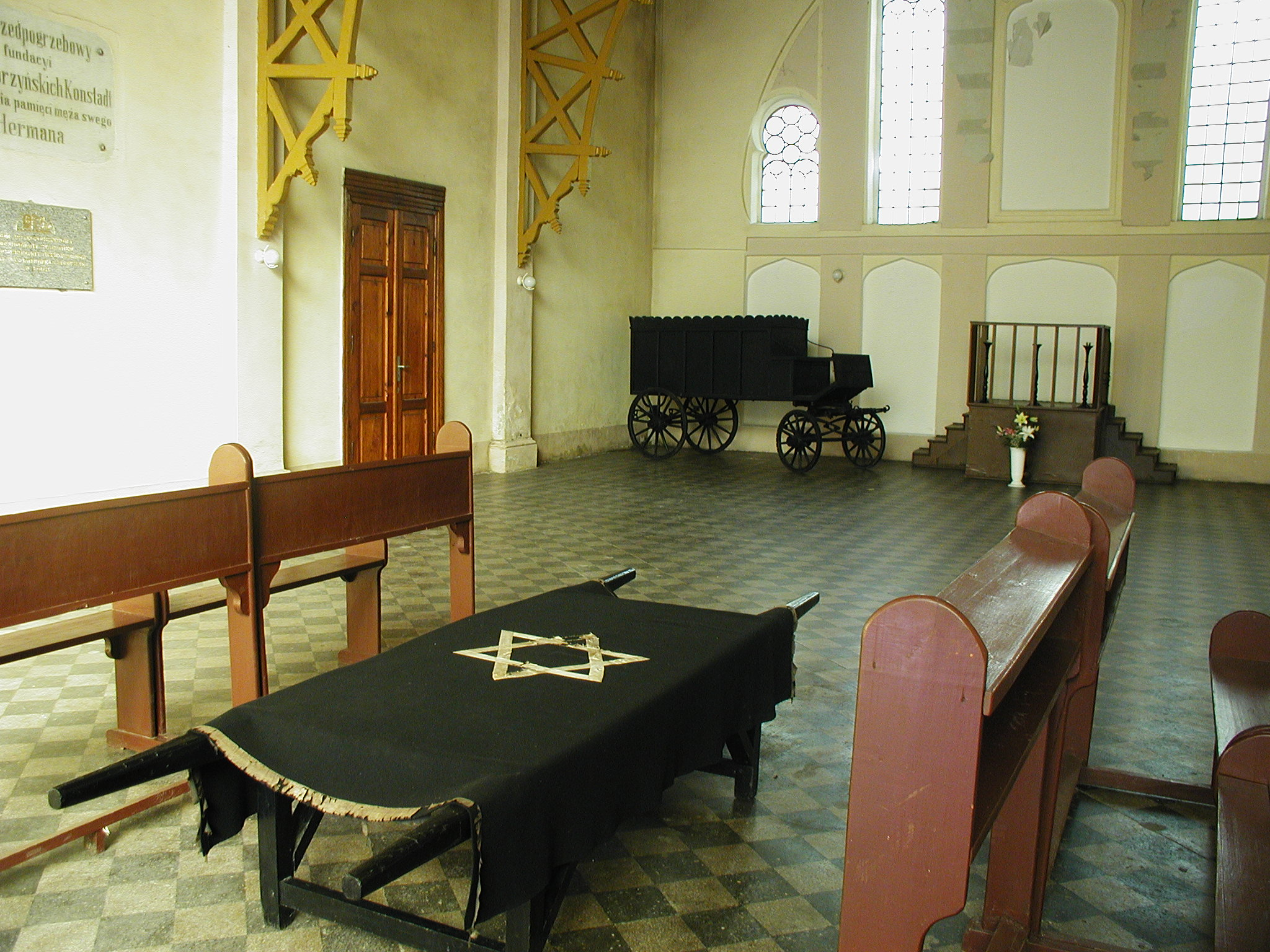
Interior of the funeral home

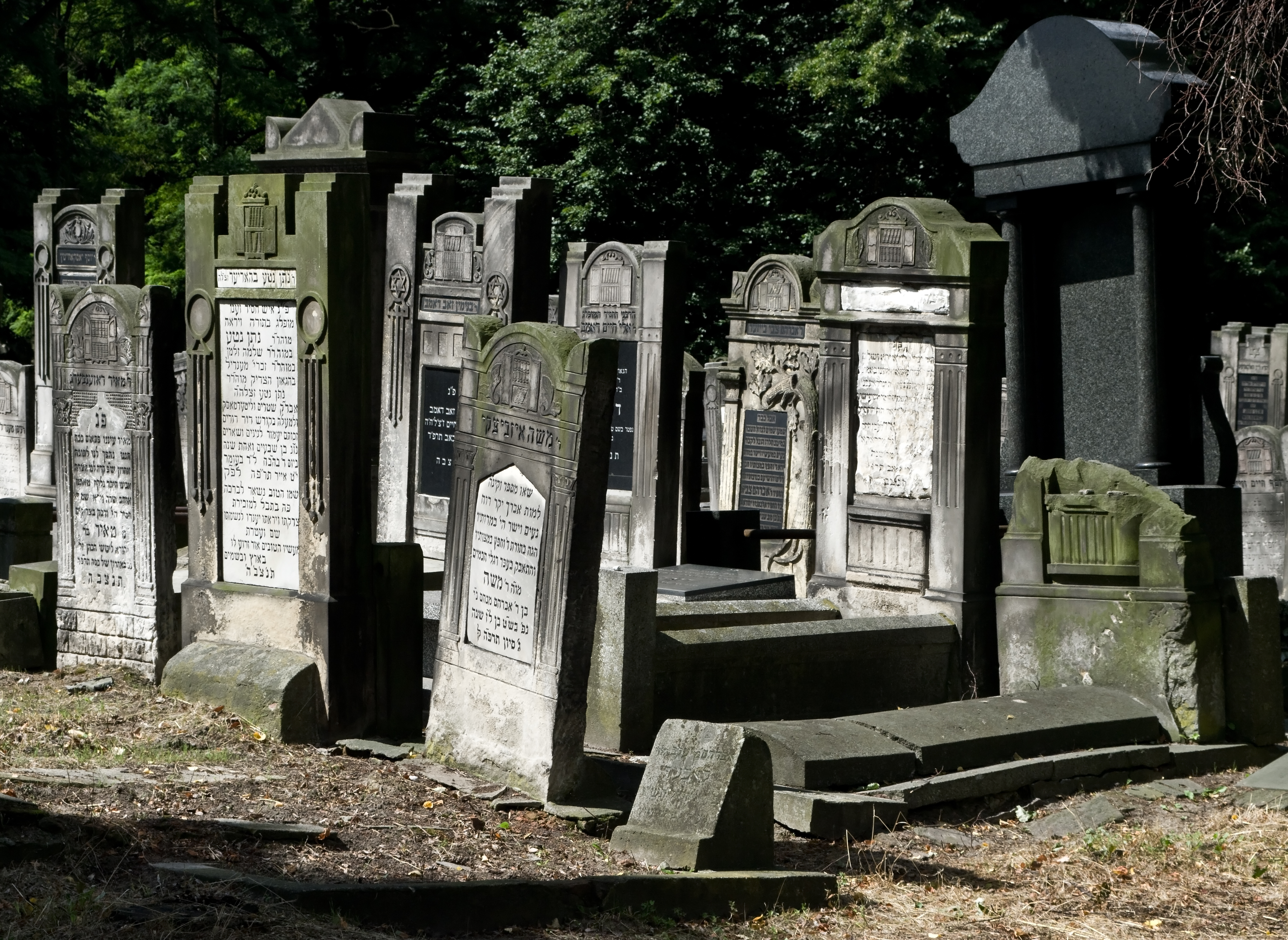
Jewish tombstones and graves in 2012

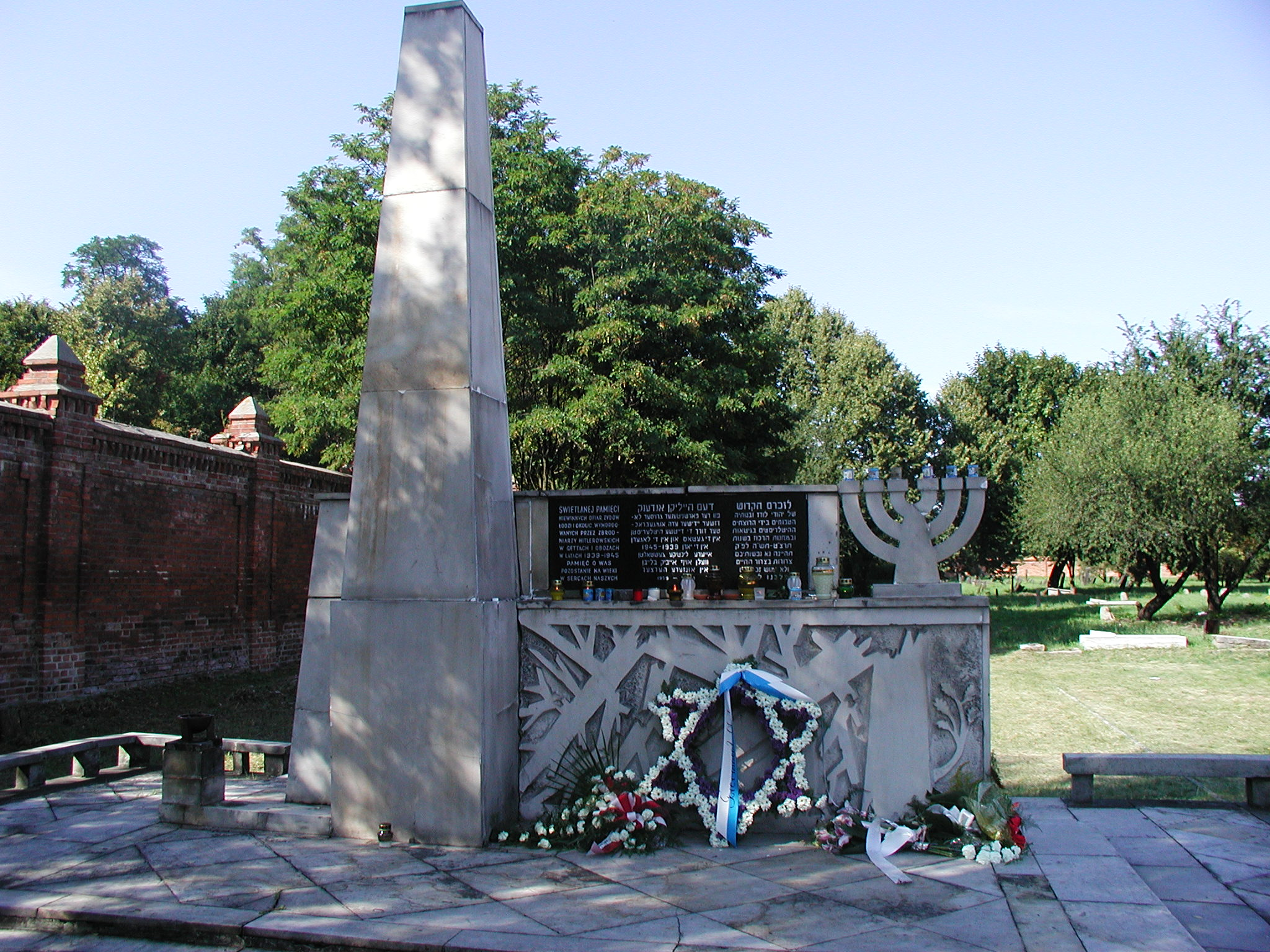
A memorial dedicated to the Holocaust victims

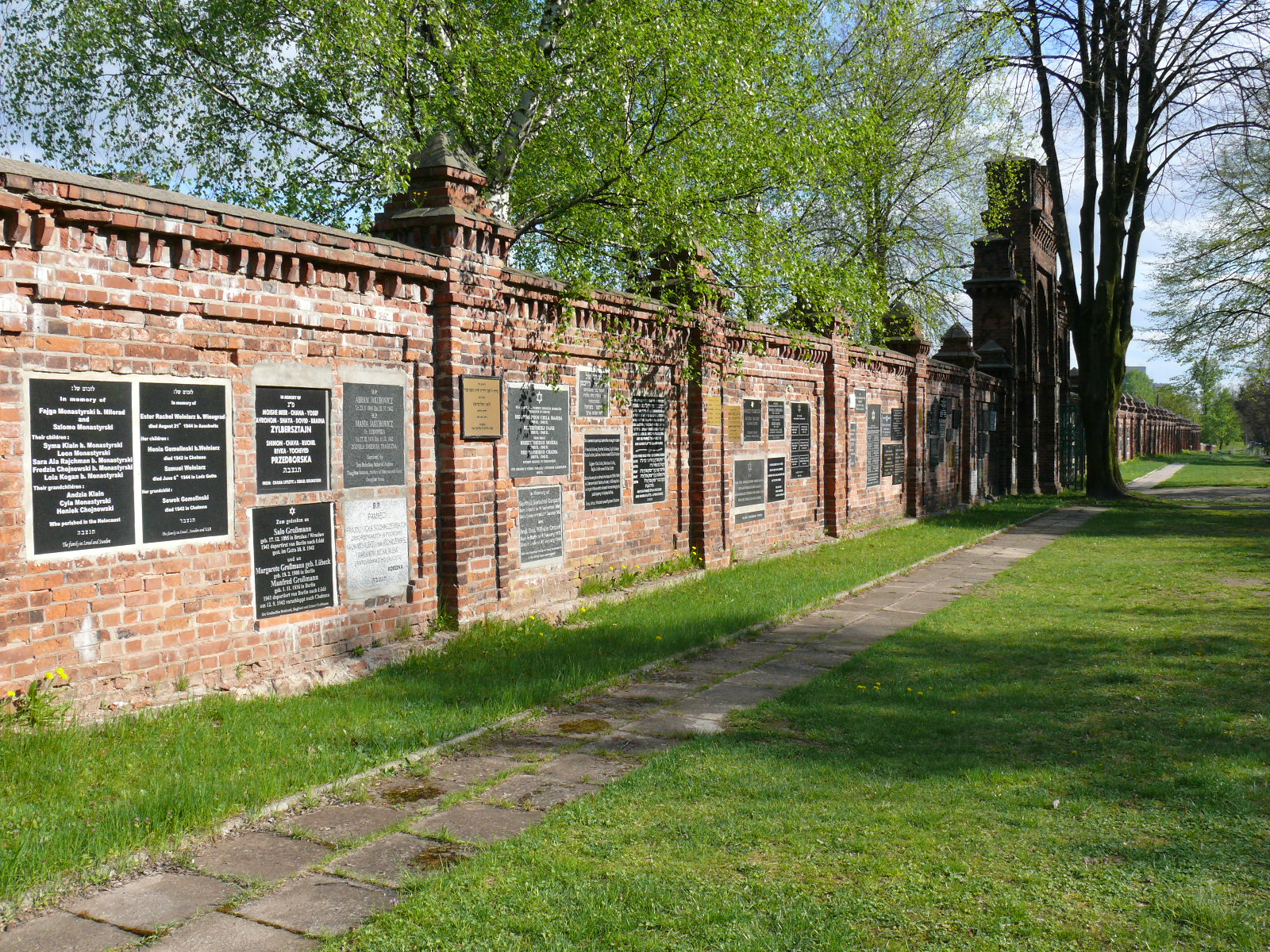
Lapidarium and the red brick wall surrounding the necropolis

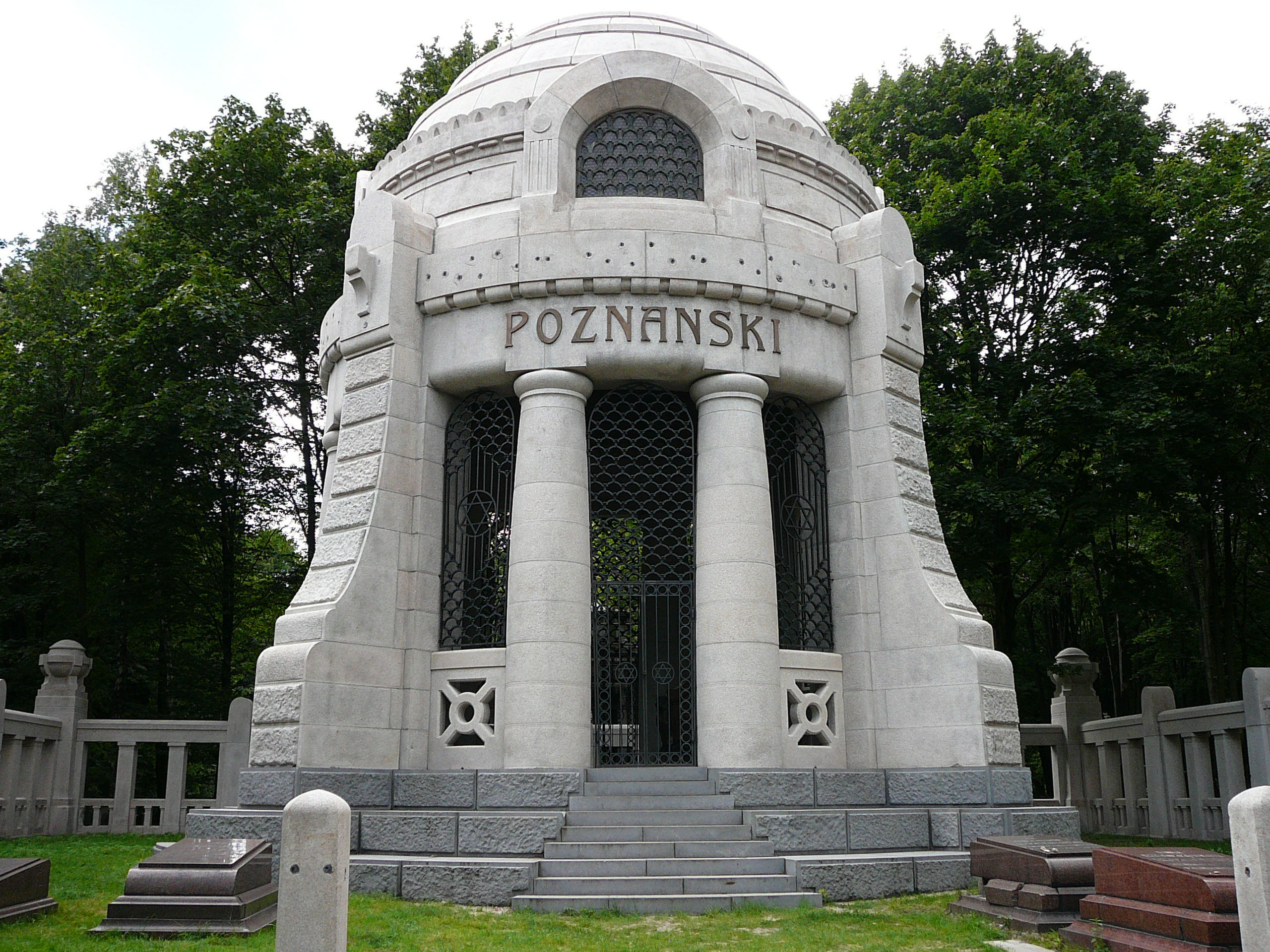
Izrael Poznański's largest Jewish tombstone

== See also ==
- Jewish Cemetery, Warsaw
- History of the Jews in Poland
- Congress Poland
