= Khotyn =

City in Chernivtsi Oblast, Ukraine

Khotyn Хотин^{1} Hotin
- City
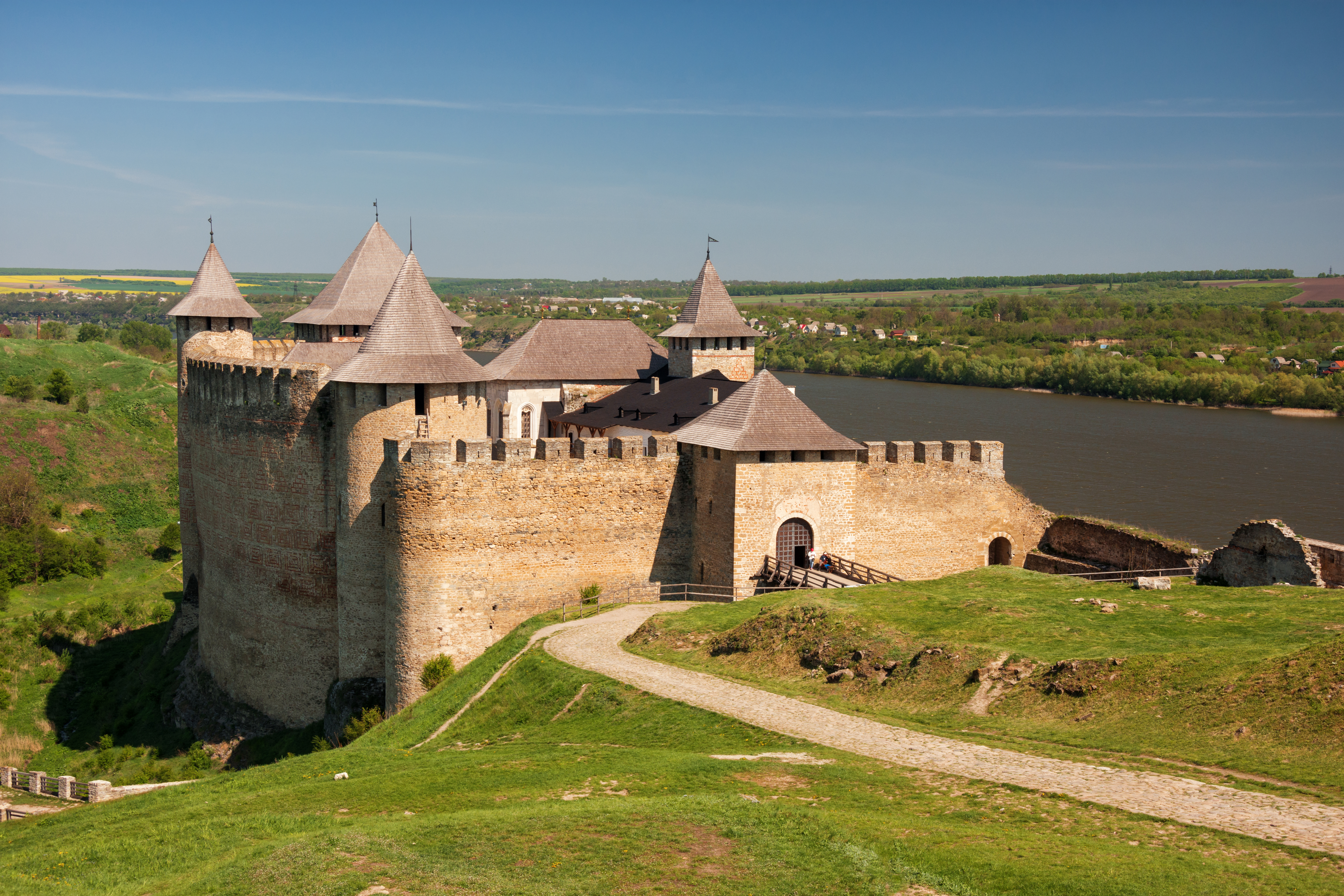
- Panoramic view of the Khotyn Fortress

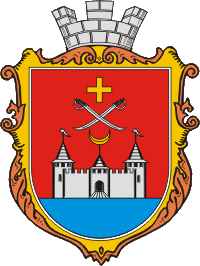
- Flag Coat of arms
- Interactive map of Khotyn
- Location of Khotyn Khotyn (Ukraine)
- Coordinates: 48°30′25″N 26°29′25″E
- Country: Ukraine
- Oblast: Chernivtsi Oblast
- Raion: Dniester Raion
- Hromada: Khotyn urban hromada
- First chronicled: September 22, 1002
- City rights: 11th century

Government
  - Mayor: Andrii Dranchuk

Area
  - Total: 182.15 km^{2} (70.33 sq mi)

Population (2001 census)
  - Total: 18 426
  - Estimate (2023): 10 000
  - Density: 545.6/km^{2} (1,413/sq mi)
- Time zone: UTC+2 (EET)
  - Summer (DST): UTC+3 (EEST)
- Postal code: 60000–60005
- Area code: +380 3731
- Website: http://khotynmr.gov.ua/

Khotyn (Ukrainian: Хотин, pronounced [xoˈtɪn]; Romanian: Hotin, pronounced [hoˈtin]; see other names) is a city in Dniester Raion, Chernivtsi Oblast of western Ukraine, located south-west of Kamianets-Podilskyi. It hosts the administration of Khotyn urban hromada, one of the hromadas of Ukraine. According to the 2001 Ukrainian census, it has a population of 11,124. Current population: 8,936 (2022 estimate).

Khotyn, first chronicled in 1001, is located on the right (southwestern) bank of the Dniester River, and is part of the historical region Bessarabia. Important architectural landmarks within the city include the Khotyn Fortress, constructed in the 13-15th centuries (new fortress started in 1325, major improvements in the 1380s and 1460s), and two 15th-century constructions by Moldavia's ruler Stephen the Great: the Prince's Palace (Palatul Domnesc) and the city's clock tower.

Historically, the town was part of the Kievan Rus' and the Galicia–Volhynia Principality (from its foundation to 1359), Principality of Moldavia, (Note: 1359–1432, 1459–1538, 1541–1562, 1572–1615, 1617–1620, 1621–1673, 1674–1684, 1699–1712) and the Polish–Lithuanian Commonwealth. (Note: 1432–1459, 1538–1541, 1562–1572, 1615–1617, 1620–1621, 1673–1674, 1684–1699) For most of the period after 1514, Moldavia was a vassal of the Ottoman Empire, which also ruled Khotyn directly (1711–1812). Subsequently, it was part of the Bessarabia Governorate of the Russian Empire (1812–1917), and de jure it was part of Moldavian Democratic Republic (1917–1918). Khotyn was part of Romania (1918–1940, 1941–1944), was annexed by the Ukrainian Soviet Socialist Republic within the Soviet Union (1940–1941, 1944–1991) and now is part of independent Ukraine (1991–present).

== Name ==
Khotyn (Polish: Chocim; Romanian: Hotin; Russian: Хотин, romanized: Khotin; Turkish: Hotin; Ukrainian: Хотин; Yiddish: כעטין, romanized: Khetìn) was conquered and controlled by many different states, resulting in many name changes. Other name variations include Chotyn, or Choczim (especially in Polish).

== History ==
=== Early history: 11th–15th centuries ===
Khotyn, located on cliffs above the Dniester, is sometimes conflated with a sound-alike locality mentioned in 1001, a minor settlement of Kievan Rus'. Archaeological excavations found that the Kievan town covered the area of some twenty hectares. It later became part of the Principality of Halych and its successor, Halych-Volhynia. The town was an important trading center due to its location by a river crossing. A Genoese trading colony was established there by the 13th century.

Khotyn was first mentioned in 1310, as a residence of a catholic bishop, being held in the first half of the 14th century by the Kingdom of Poland, which intended to impose Catholicism on the local Vlach (Romanian) communities, mentioned there in the 10th-13th centuries. The first fortifications date back from this period. In 1351, the Grand Duchy of Lithuania conquered the area, only to give it three years later to the Romanians, who formed their own independent principality in 1359, Moldavia.

The present-day fortress was constructed after 1400 by the Moldavian ruler Alexander the Good, with the help of Vytautas the Great of Lithuania. After 1433, it was occupied by Poland, due to wars between Alexander's successors, and was reconquered from the Poles by Stephen the Great of Moldavia in 1459 after a two-year siege. The fortress, strengthened by Stephen, during the 15th century, became the strongest on the northern border of the medieval Moldavia.

=== Conquest by different states ===
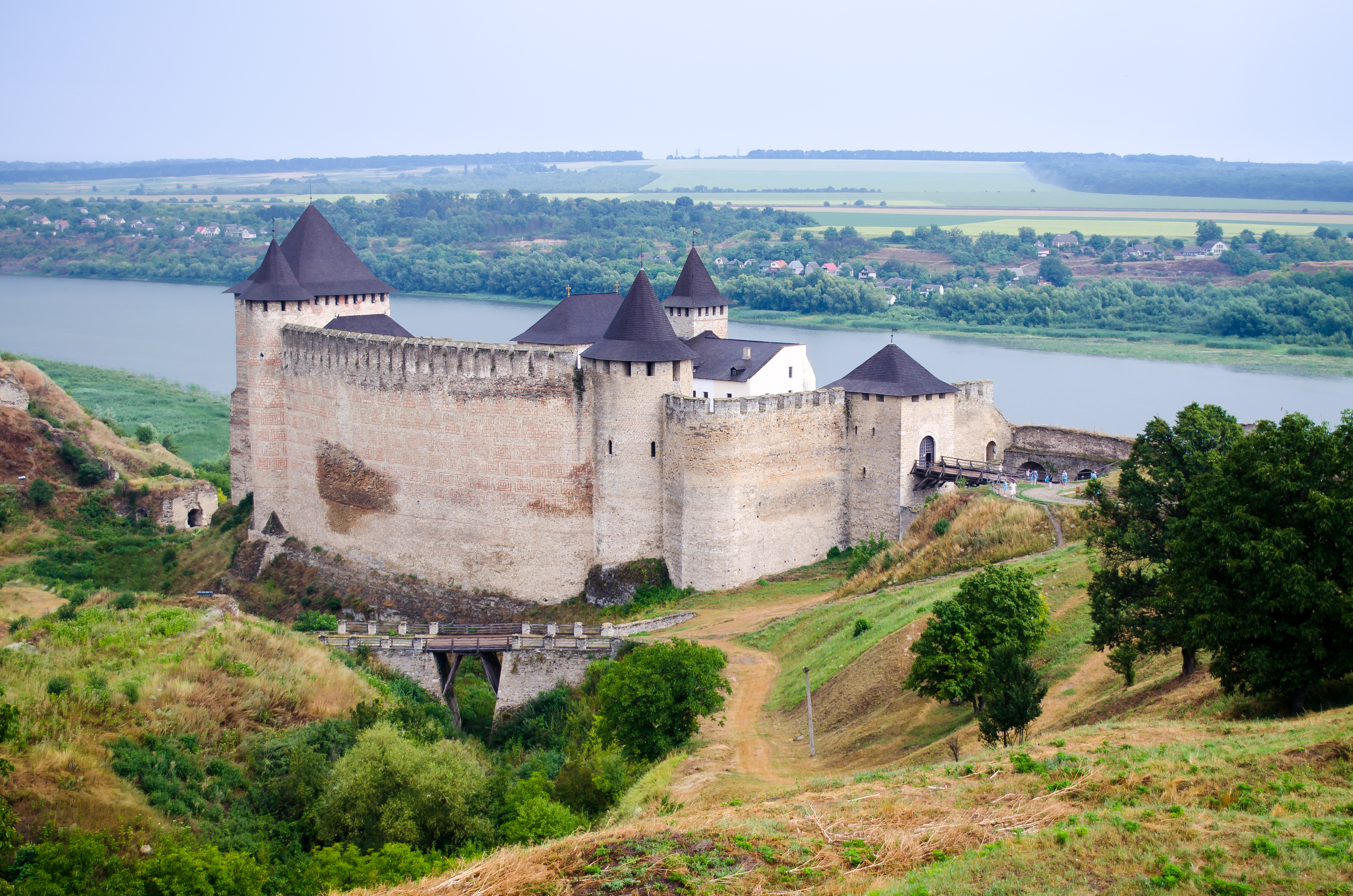
The Khotyn Fortress, located on the shores of the Dniester River

Map of Khotyn (around 1739)

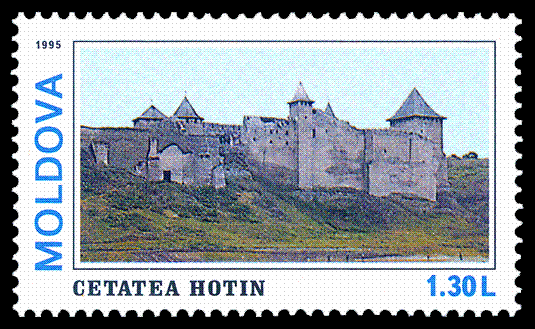
The Khotyn Fortress

During Wallachian ruler Michael the Brave's conquest of Moldavia in May 1600, its ruler Ieremia Movilă took refuge in the Fortress of Khotyn together with his family, a handful of faithful boyars, and the former Transylvanian Prince, Sigismund Bathory.

As the Moldavian state's power was weakened by that of the Ottoman Empire, the latter sought to gain control of the strategic river crossing. As a result, Hotin's later history was dominated by wars between the expanding Christian powers (first Poland, then Russia) and the expanding Ottoman Empire. The Turks suffered two decisive defeats at Khotyn in the 17th century, at the hands of the army of the Polish–Lithuanian Commonwealth: in 1621 by Hetman Jan Karol Chodkiewicz, and again in 1673 by Jan III Sobieski (see: Battles below).

The Ottoman Empire finally seized the fortress from Moldavia in 1713 during the Great Northern War and held it during the following century as a base for its troops. Another power, Russian Empire, came to claim the region in the 18th century. The Turks amplified and enlarged the citadel, which was besieged and taken by the Russians on four occasions: in 1739 by Burkhard Christoph von Münnich, in 1769 by Prince Alexander Galitzine, in 1788 by Prince Josias of Coburg, and Ivan Saltykov, in 1807 by Ivan Ivanovich Michelson.

With the start of the Russo-Turkish War in 1806, the Hotin Fortress was taken by the Imperial Russian Army and passed to Russia. With the signing of the Bucharest Peace Treaty in 1812, the entire region that became known as Bessarabia was annexed by the Russian Empire from Moldavia.

From 1812 to 1918, Hotin was the administrative center of the Hotin County, one of the twelve, later nine counties of Bessarabia. During the 19th century, due to economic reasons and the Russian policy of colonization and russification, the Ukrainian population of Bessarabia (especially in its north) increased significantly, from around 15,000 in 1810 to around 200,000 in 1917 (of which over half in the northern half of the Hotin county alone), mostly by migration from Podolia (just across the river Dniester). During World War I, the north-eastern corner of the Hotin county was the only area of Bessarabia occupied temporarily by Austria-Hungary.

=== Modern history: 20th–21st centuries ===
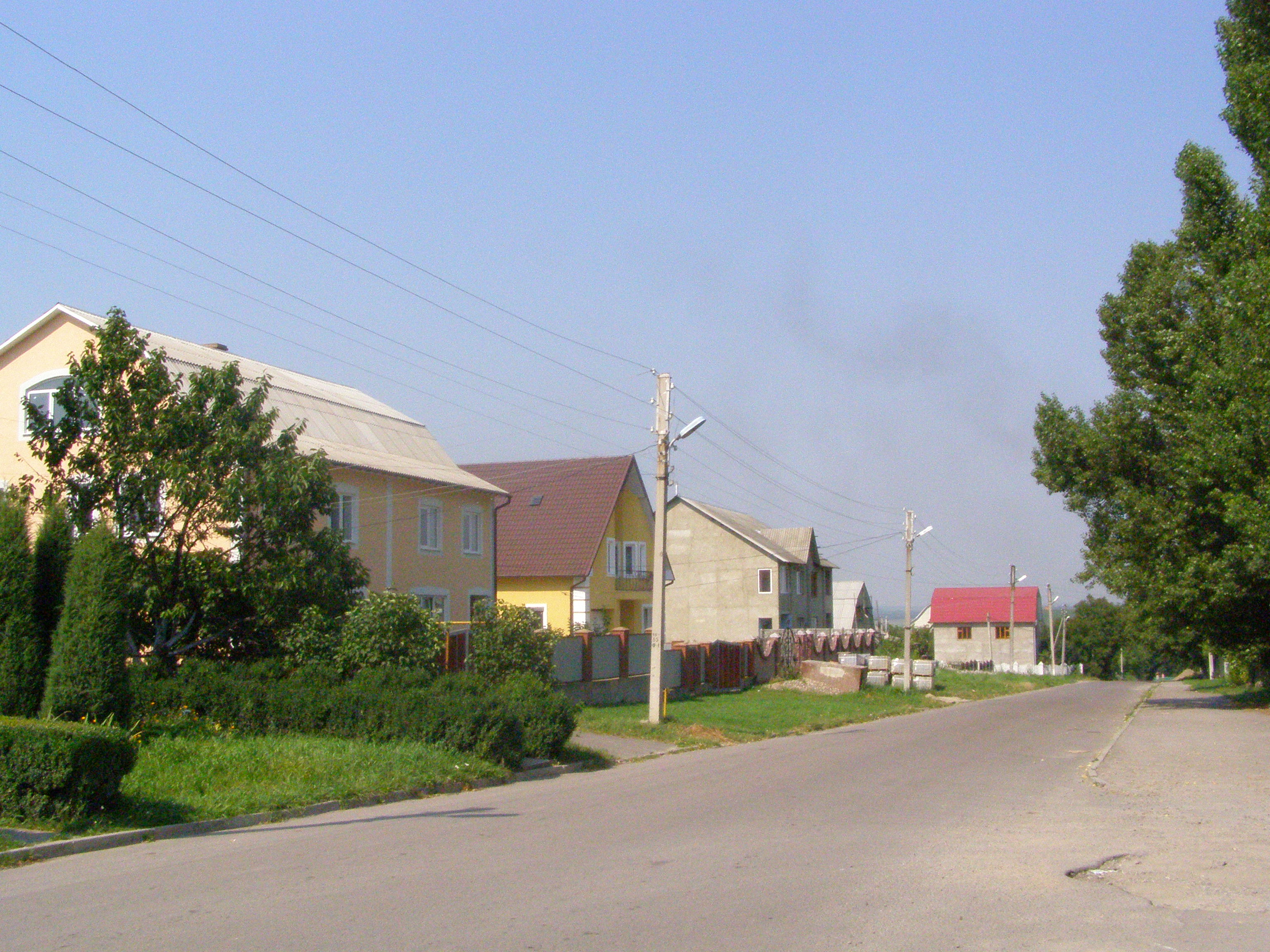
A street in Khotyn

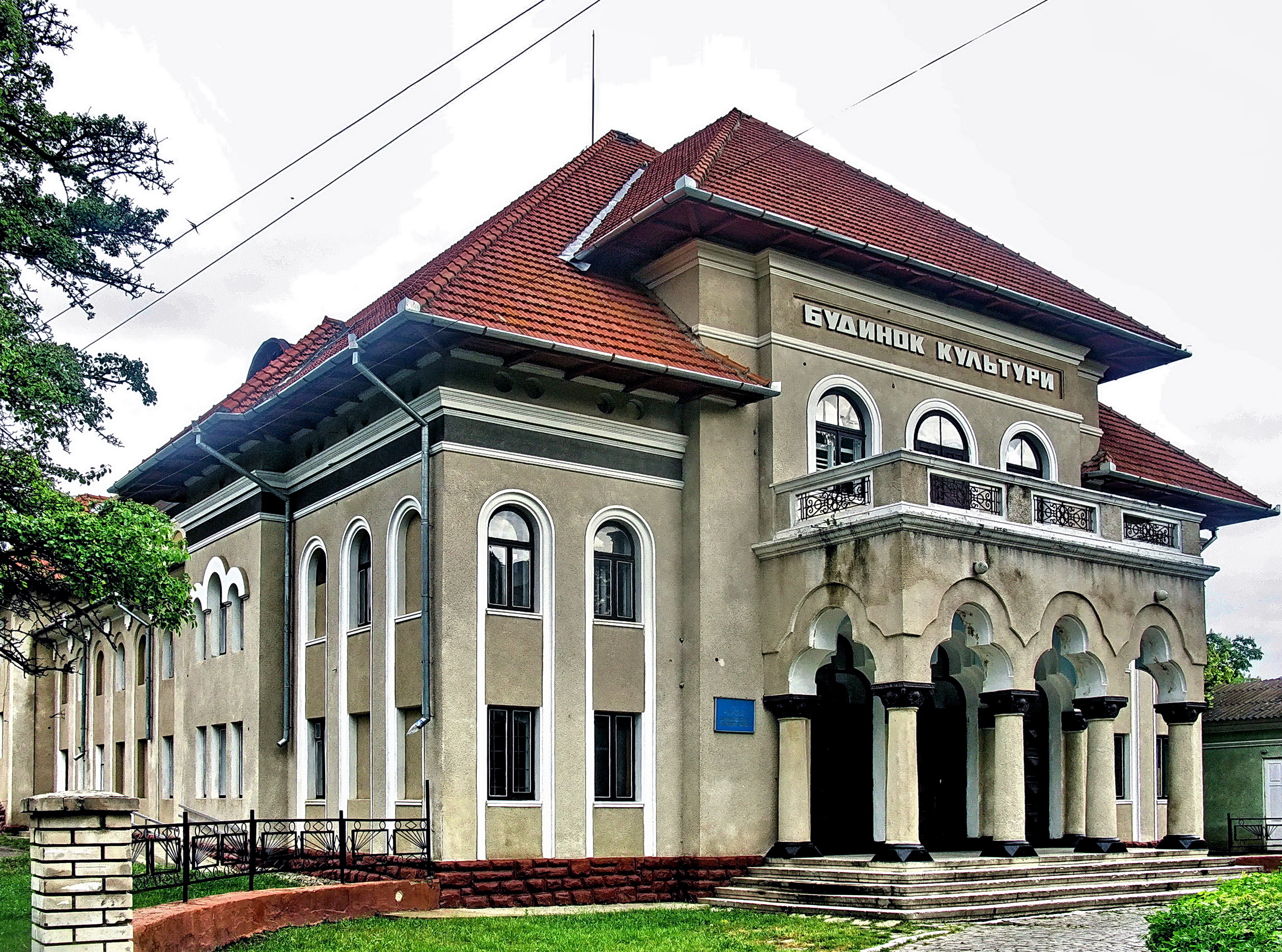
Khotyn theatre

With the collapse of the Russian Empire, Bessarabia proclaimed independence from Russia as the Moldavian Democratic Republic in 1917. The Austrians were in control of Khotyn and several surrounding villages for several months starting February 28, 1918. In April 1918 the Moldavian Democratic Republic formally proclaimed a union with Romania. Romania and Austria signed a peace treaty in May 1918, and the Austrians withdrew from the area. The treaty was not formally ratified by Romania, a former Entente ally which found itself isolated, until on November 10 Romania re-entered the war. Shortly after that, in January 1919, local Ukrainians desiring to be part of Ukraine, started a revolt, which was also exploited by some Soviet agitators, followed by the expulsion and massacre of Ukrainian rebels and collaborators during the rebellion by the Romanian authorities from January 23 to February 1, 1919. After the Khotyn Uprising was put down by the Romanian Army, Romania implemented policies aimed at the re-Romanianization of the territory. At this time, the population was approximately 35,000.

The city remained under Romanian control until June 28, 1940, when along with Bessarabia and Northern Bukovina it was occupied by the Soviet Union. In August 1940 most of Bessarabia became the Moldavian Soviet Socialist Republic of the Soviet Union; however, Northern Bukovina and the area around Khotyn were attached to the Ukrainian Soviet Socialist Republic as Chernivtsi Oblast and the southernmost part of Bessarabia (Budjak) became the Akkerman (later Izmail) Oblast. After Operation Barbarossa, where Romania acted as a German ally, the area was retaken by Romania in early July 1941. In March 1944, with the defeat of the Axis forces, the town was retaken by the Soviets, and reattached to Soviet Ukraine. The Jews were deported to Transnistria by the Romanian authorities in 1941, where most of them died.

With the collapse of the Soviet Union and the Declaration of Independence of Ukraine in 1991, Khotyn became a part of newly independent Ukraine. In 2000, the Cabinet of Ministers of Ukraine created the historical-architectural preserve "Khotynska Fortetsia" (Khotyn Fortress). In September 2002, the city celebrated its 1,000 year anniversary.

Until July 18, 2020, Khotyn served as an administrative center of Khotyn Raion. The raion was abolished in July 2020 as part of the administrative reform of Ukraine, which reduced the number of raions of Chernivtsi Oblast to three. The area of Khotyn Raion was merged into Dniester Raion.

== Battles ==
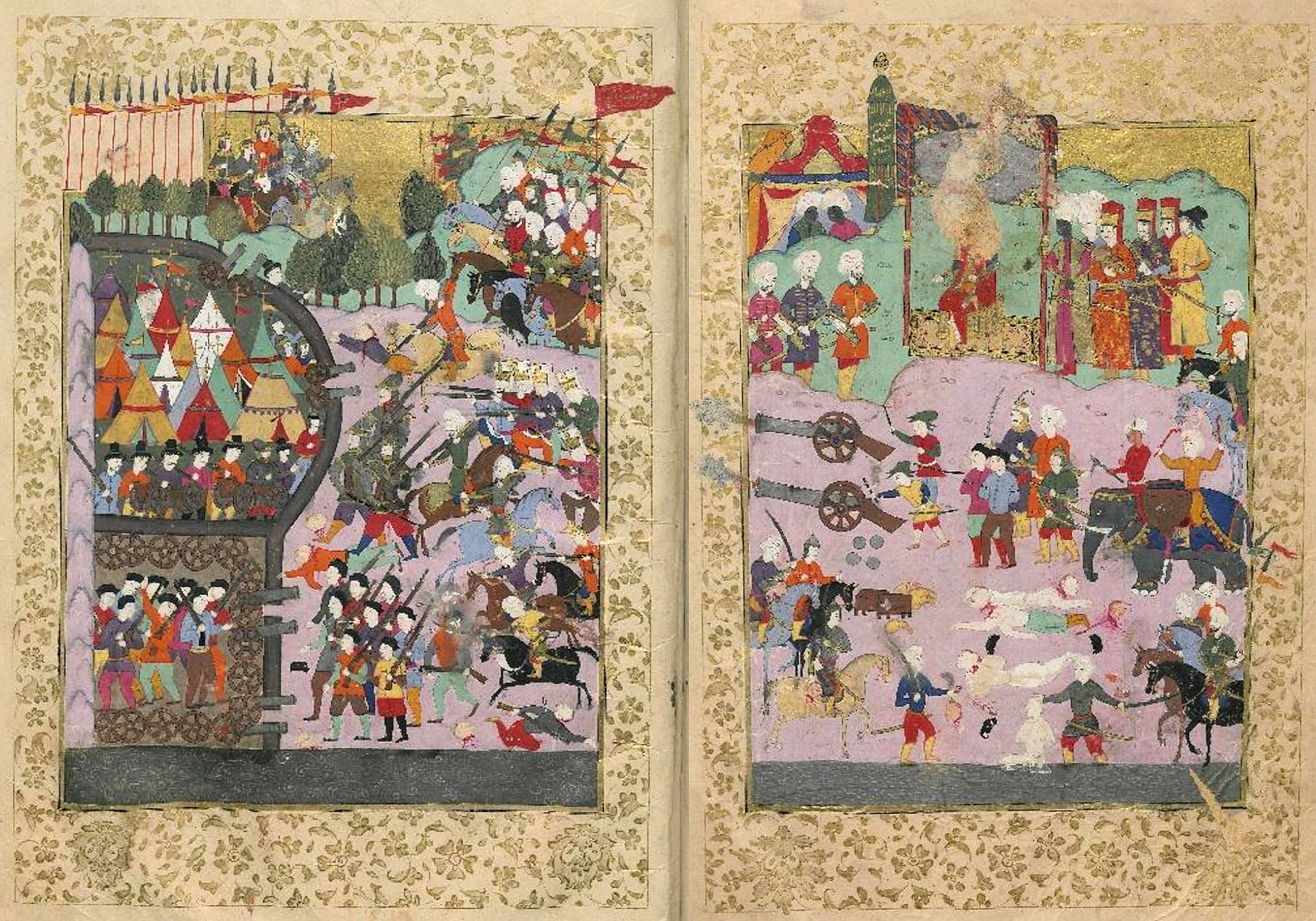
Ottoman-Polish battle during the Khotyn campaign in 1621 (Şehnāme-i Nādirī, TPML, H. 1124, 67b-68a).

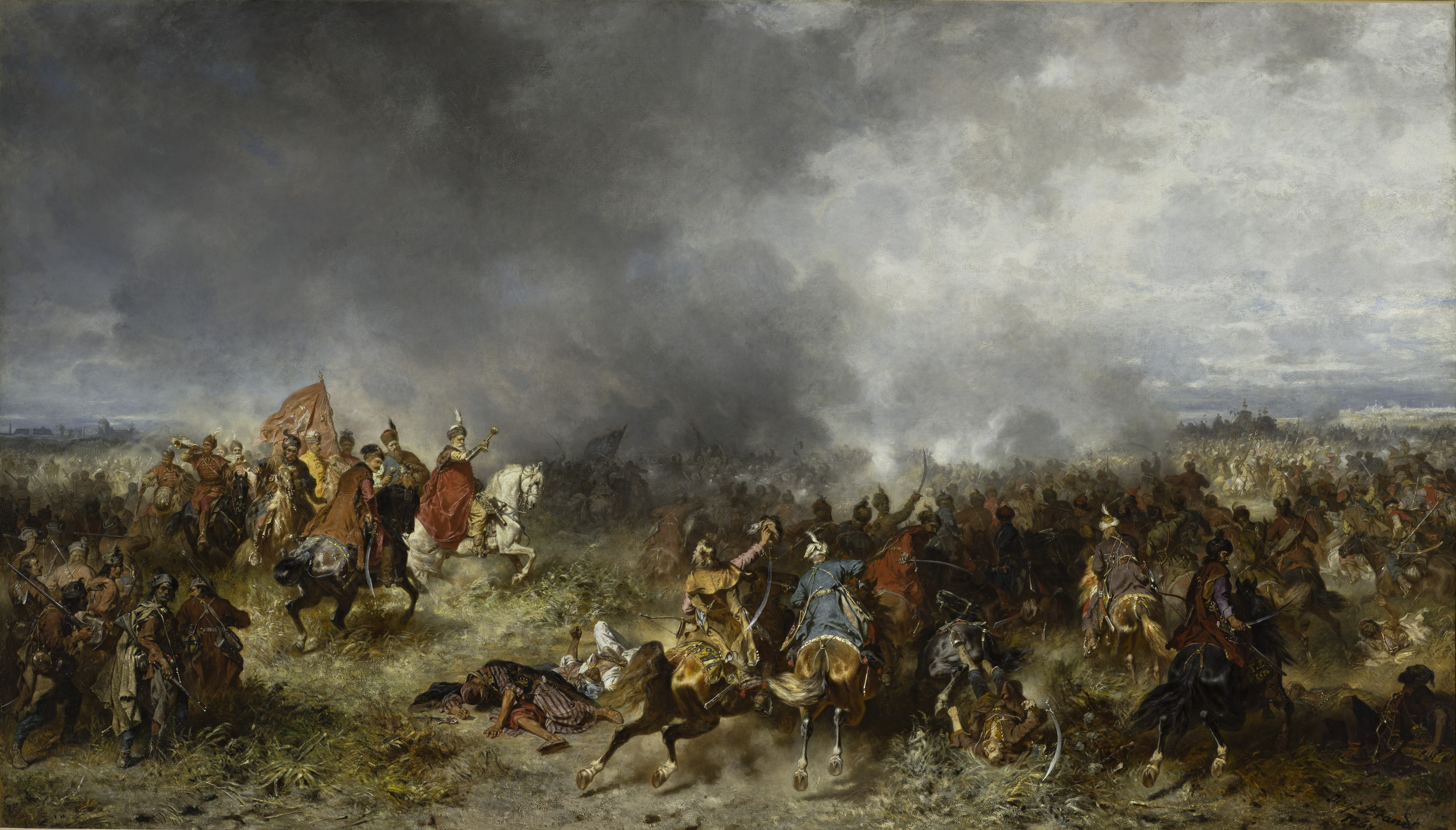
Jan Karol Chodkiewicz (in red) at Chocim

In the first Battle of Khotyn in 1621, an army led by Osman II, advanced from Adrianople towards the Polish frontier. The Turks, following their victory in the Battle of Cecora, had high hopes of conquering Polish controlled Ukraine. The Polish–Lithuanian Commonwealth commander Jan Karol Chodkiewicz crossed the Dniester in September 1621 with approximately 35,000 soldiers and entrenched the Khotyn Fortress, blocking the path of the Ottoman march. The arrival of 40,000 Ukrainian Cossack forces under their hetman Petro Konashevych was helpful in that anti-Ottoman victory. The Commonwealth hetman held the sultan at bay for a whole month, until the first snow of autumn compelled Osman to withdraw his diminished forces. But the victory was also dearly purchased by Poland: a few days before the siege was raised, the aged grand hetman died of exhaustion in the fortress on September 24, 1621. The Commonwealth forces held under the command of Stanisław Lubomirski. The battle, described by Wacław Potocki in his most famous work Transakcja wojny chocimskiej, marked the end of the long period of Moldavian Magnate Wars.

In 1673, the Polish hussars again fought a major battle on this site (second Battle of Khotyn). This time Polish forces under the command of soon-to-be-king Jan Sobieski defeated the Ottomans on November 11, 1673. In this battle, rockets of Kazimierz Siemienowicz were successfully used. This brilliant victory was a prelude to the Battle of Vienna 1683.

In the Russo-Turkish War (1735–1739), the fortress was taken by Russian field marshal Burkhard Christoph von Münnich on August 30 [O.S. August 19] 1739. This victory is remembered primarily through the Ode on the Taking of Khotyn from the Turks, composed by the young Mikhail Lomonosov. This ode has a place in the history of Russian literature: its sonorous iambic verse is often taken as a starting point of the modern Russian poetry.

== Notable people ==
- Alexandrina Cernov (1943–2024), Ukrainian Romanian academic, literary historian and philologist
- Jacques Dicker (1879–1942), Russian-born Jewish socialist politician and lawyer in Switzerland
- Vasile Mariuțan (1935–1999), Romanian boxer
- Alemdar Mustafa Pasha (1765–1808), Ottoman Albanian Grand Vizier

== Historic sites ==
Khotyn is most famous for its fortress complex. Khotyn contains a Jewish cemetery, indexed by the U.S. Commission for the Preservation of America's Heritage Abroad.

A church built in the fortress grounds was later converted to a mosque by the Turks.
