= Jewish cemetery =

Place of burial for Jews

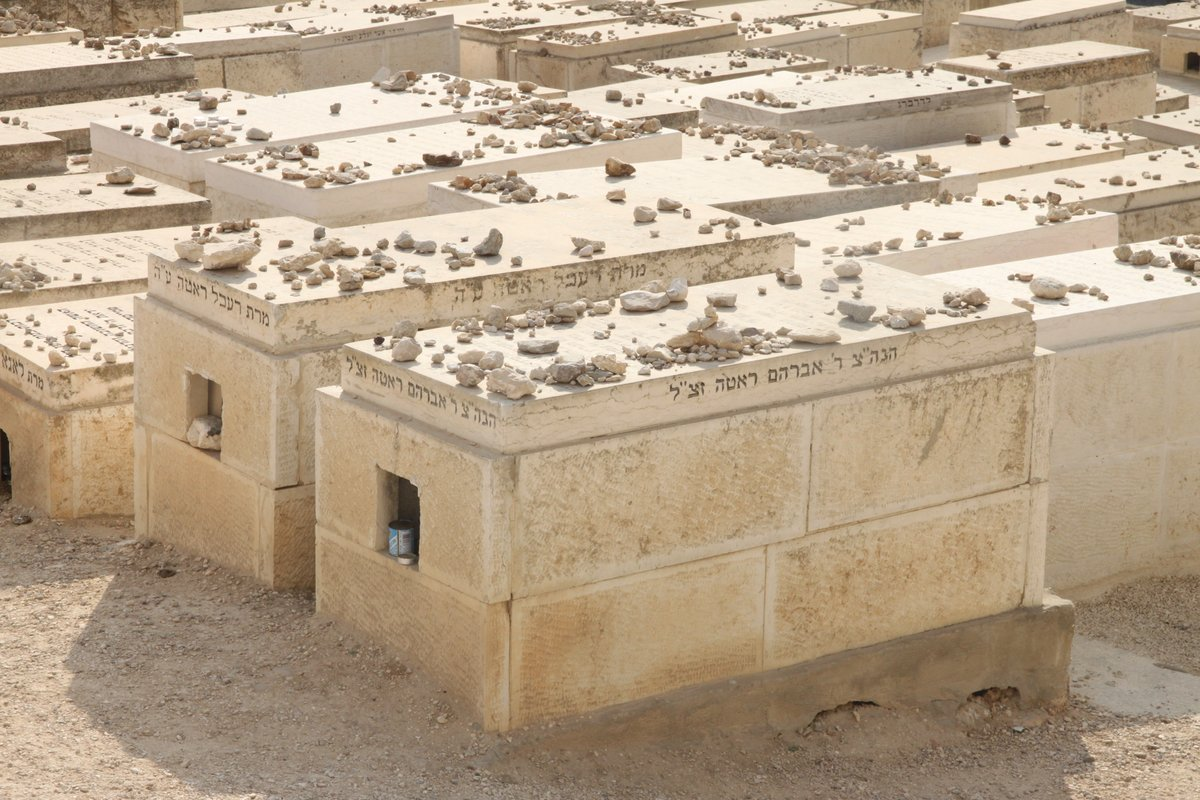
Jewish graves, Israel

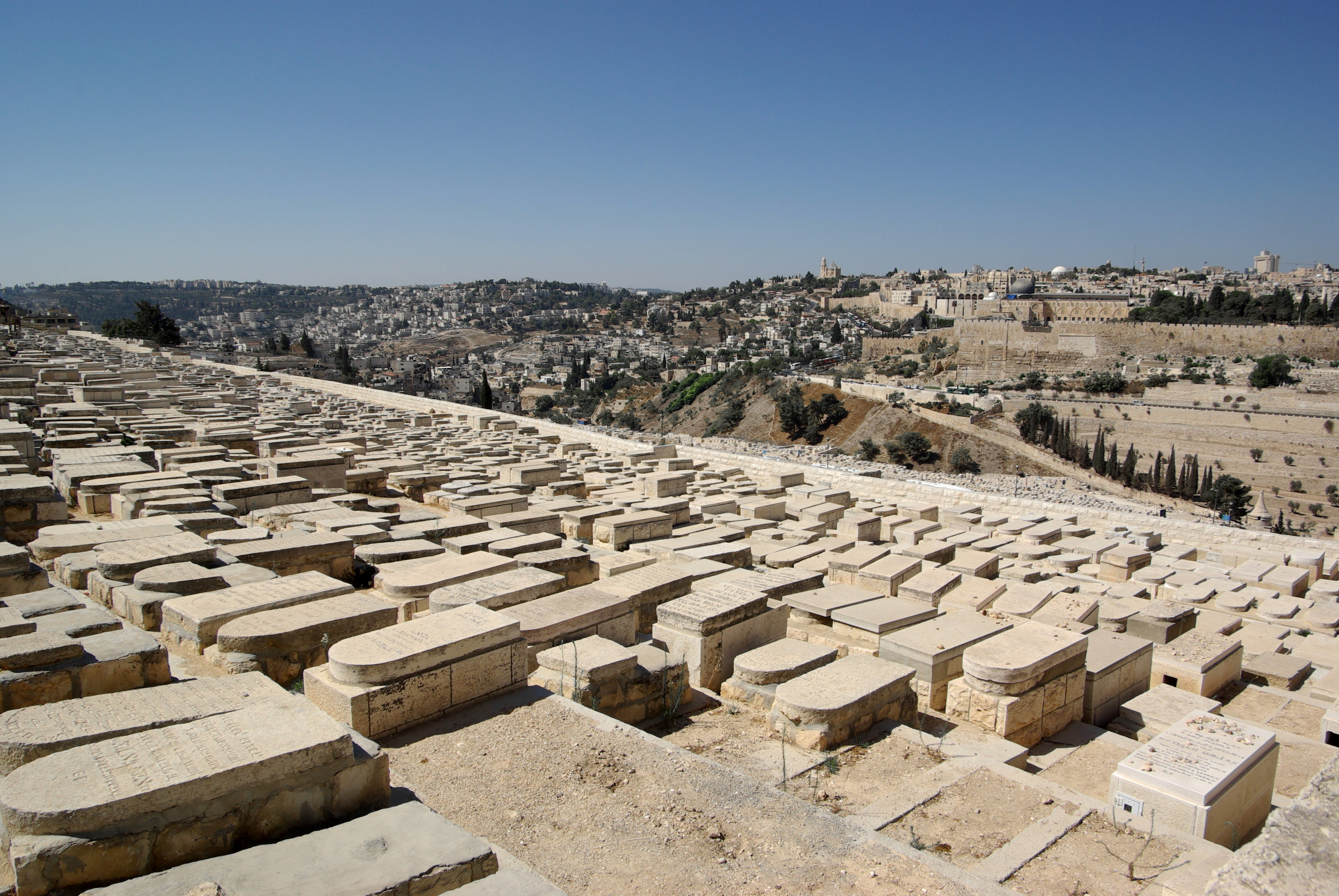
Tombstones in Mount of Olives Jewish Cemetery, Jerusalem

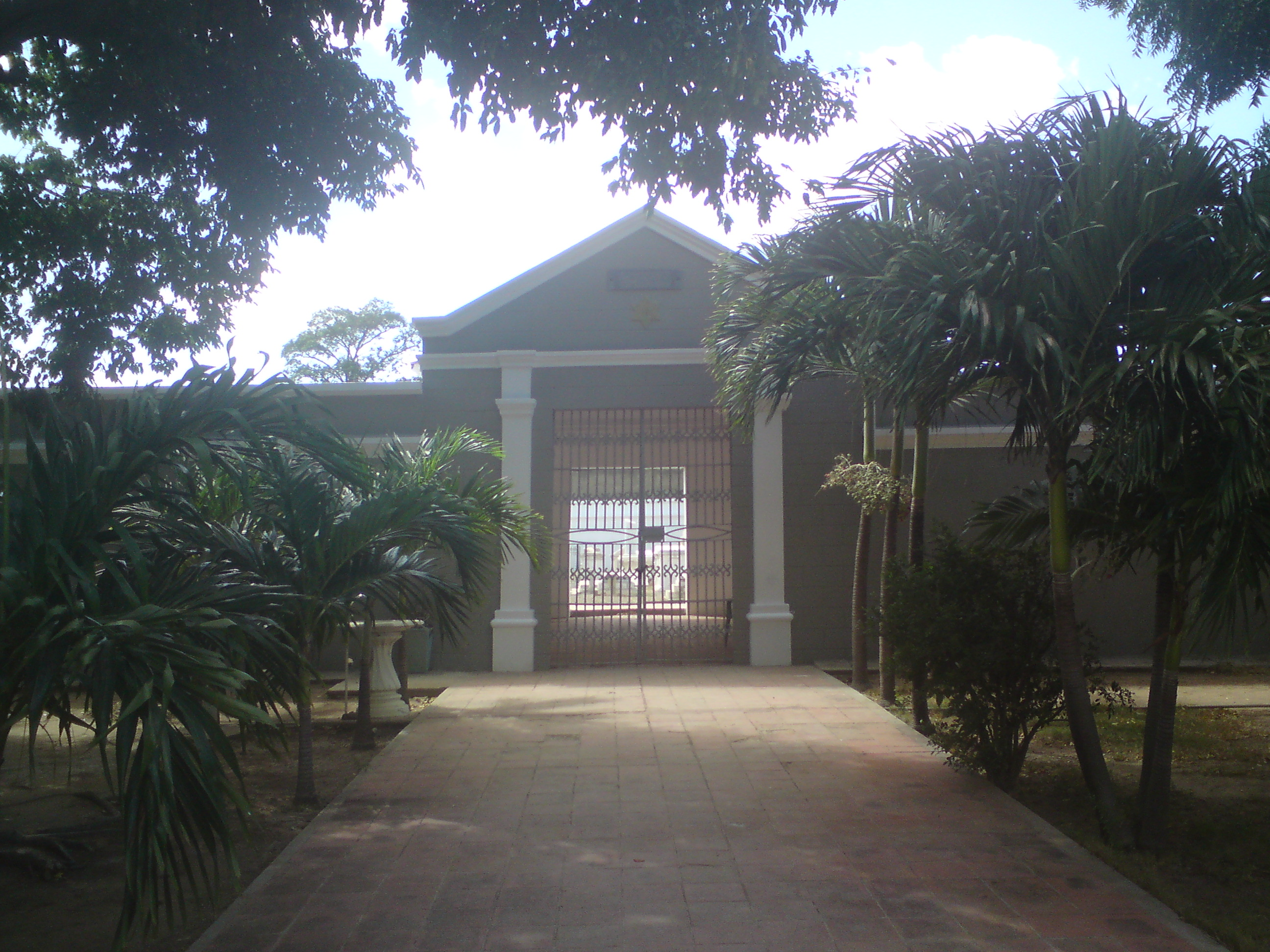
Façade of the Jewish Cemetery of Coro, Venezuela

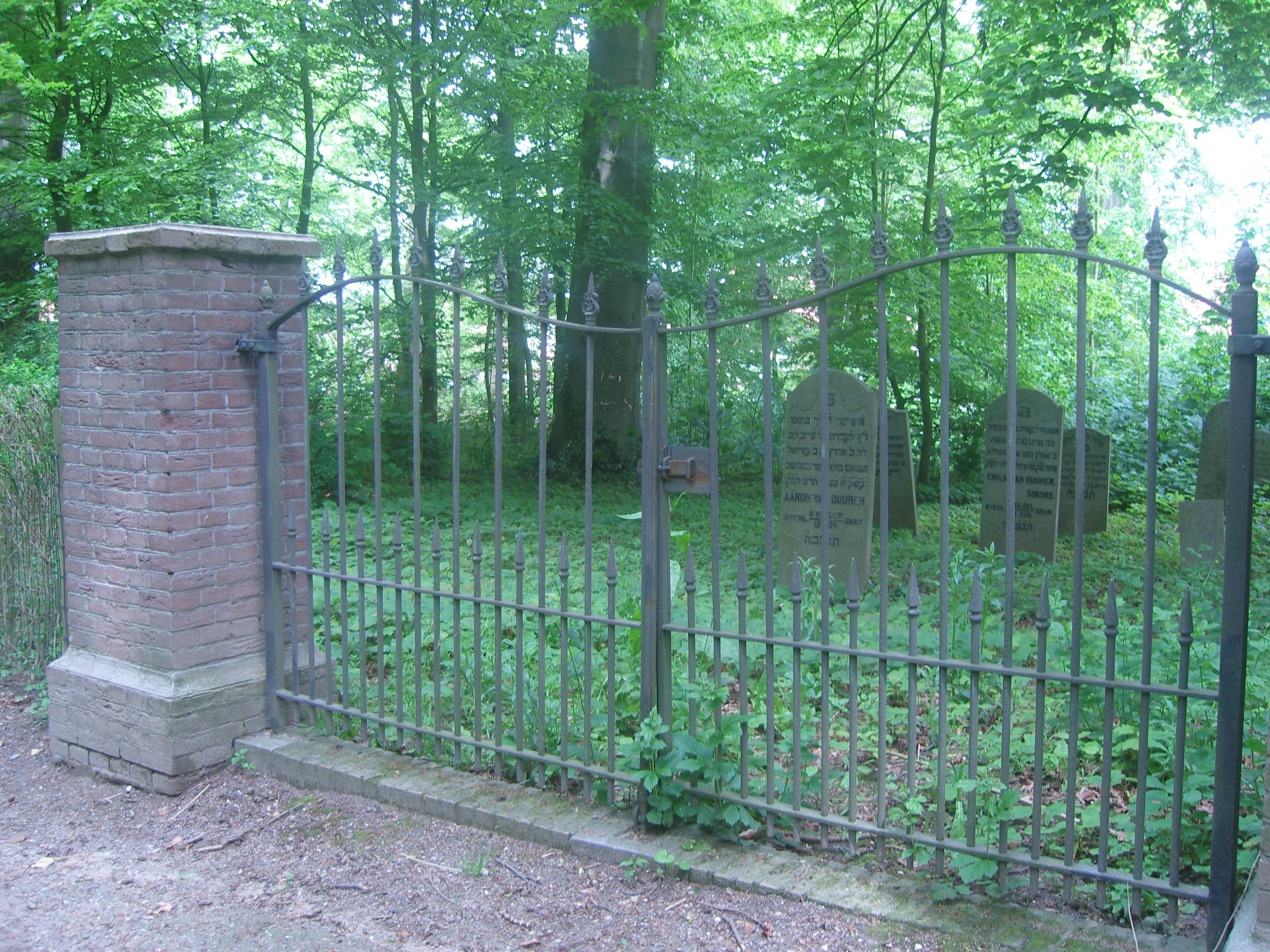
Jewish cemetery at Kasteelwal in Buren, The Netherlands

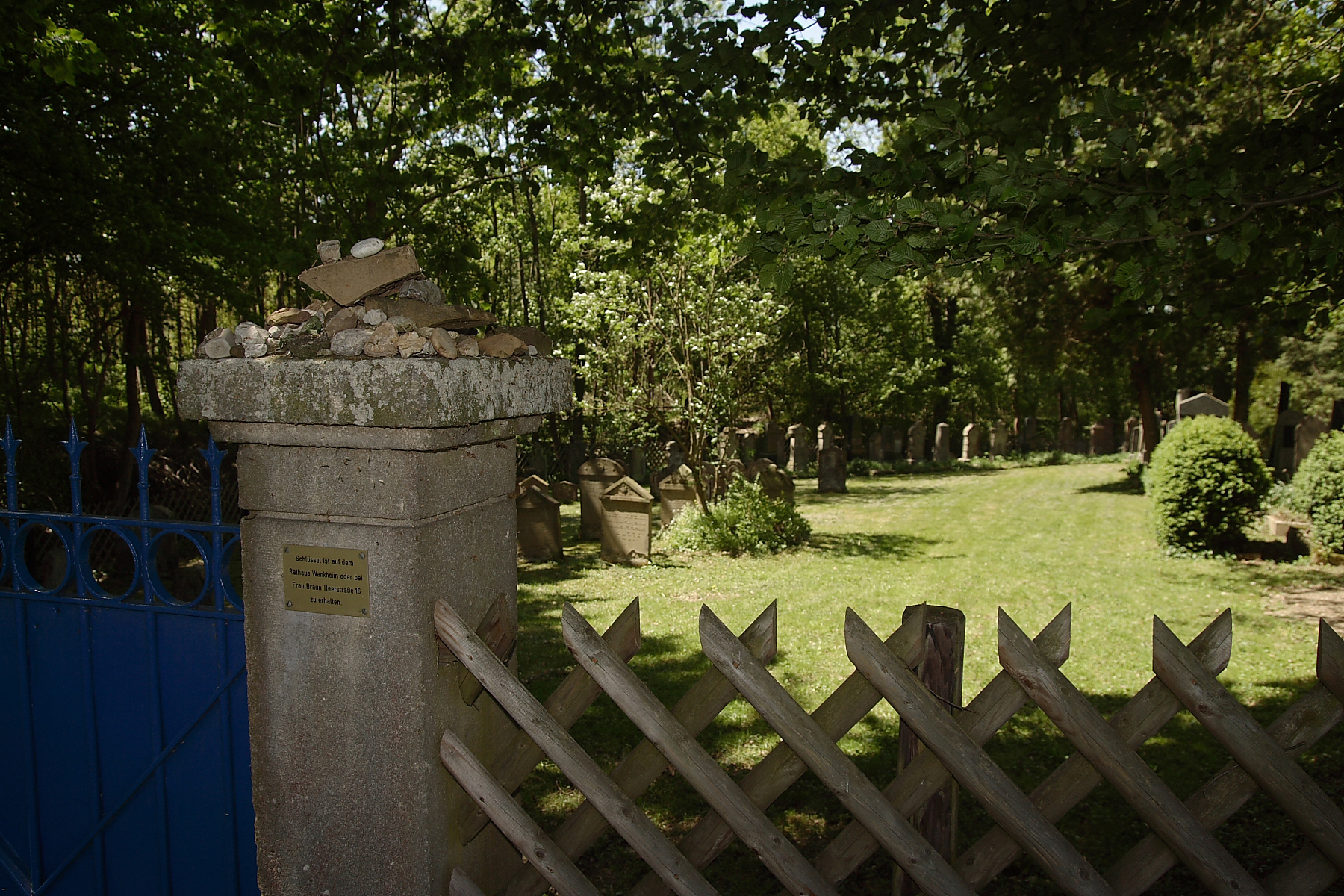
Jewish cemetery Wankheim/Tübingen, Germany

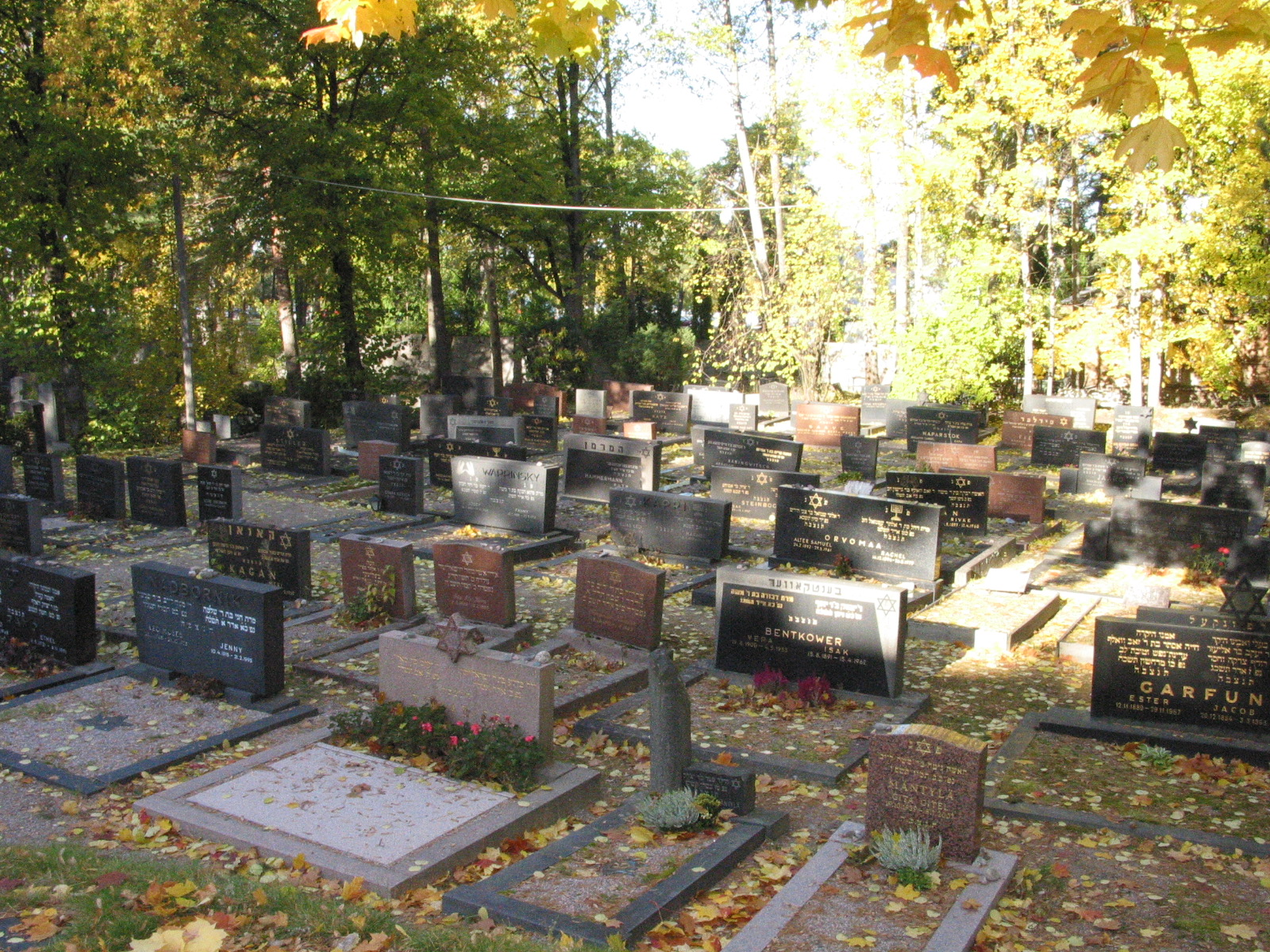
Jewish Cemetery in Helsinki, Finland

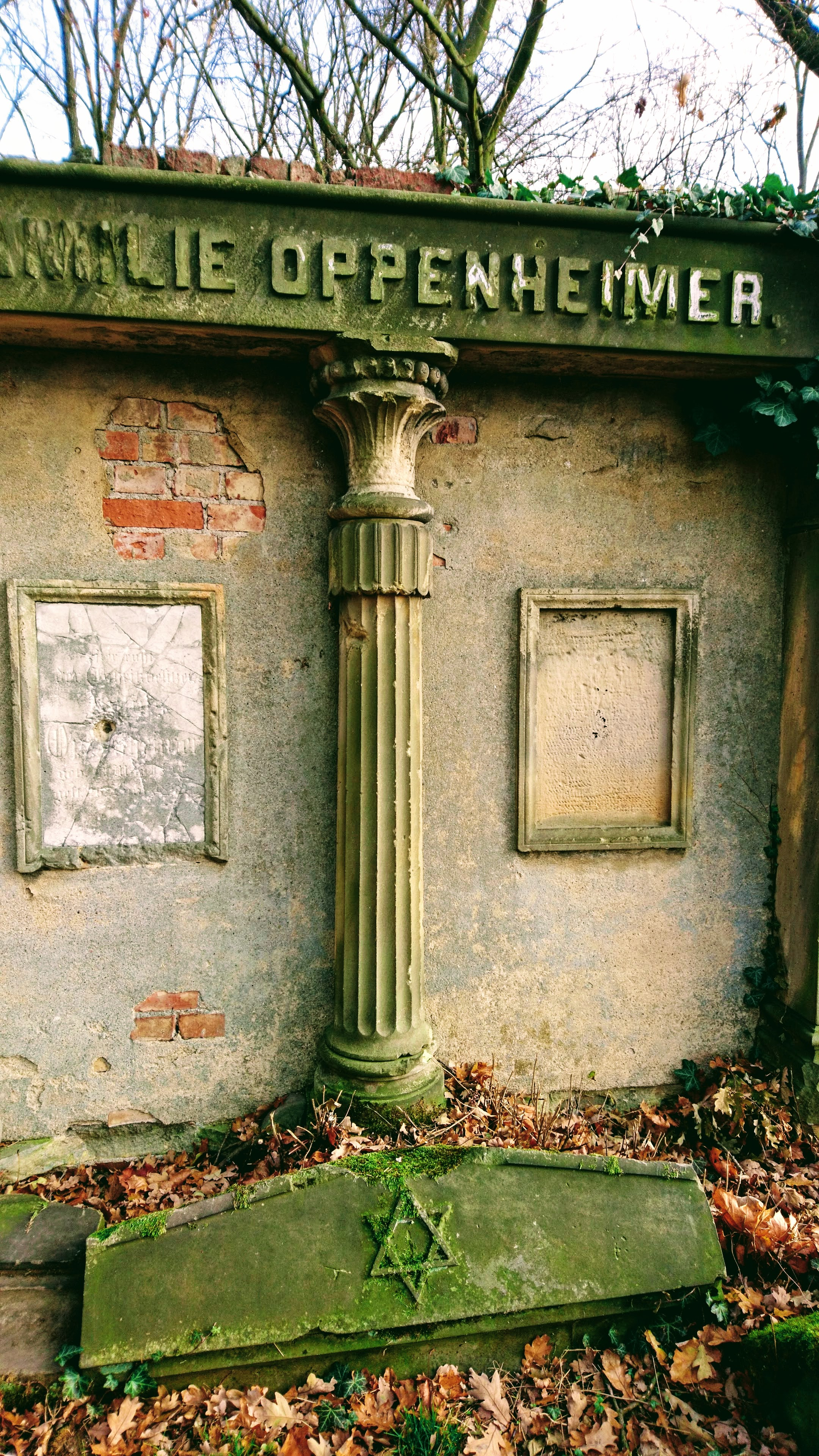
Tombstone at the Jewish cemetery in Szprotawa, Poland

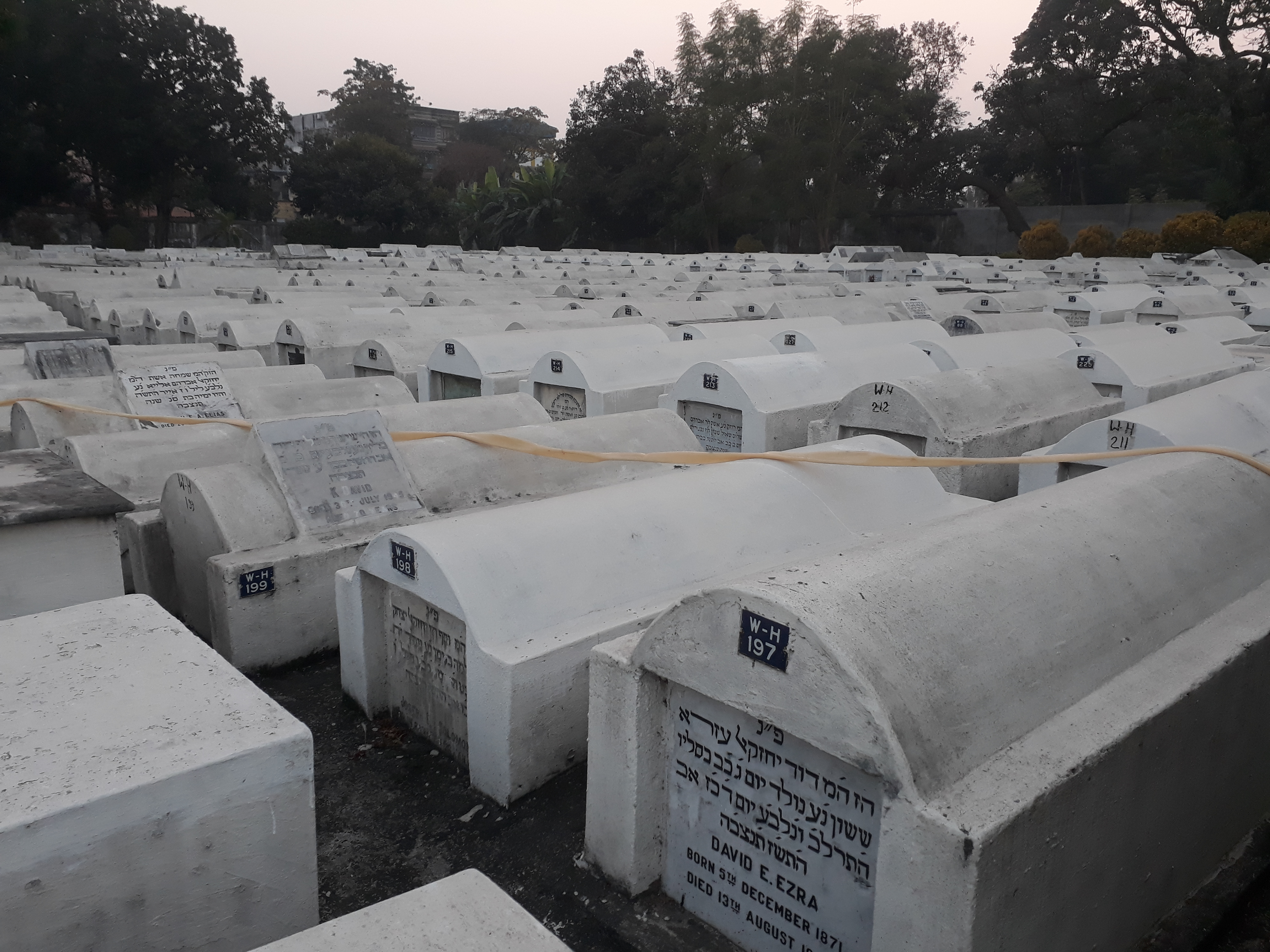
Jewish Cemetery in Kolkata, West Bengal, India.

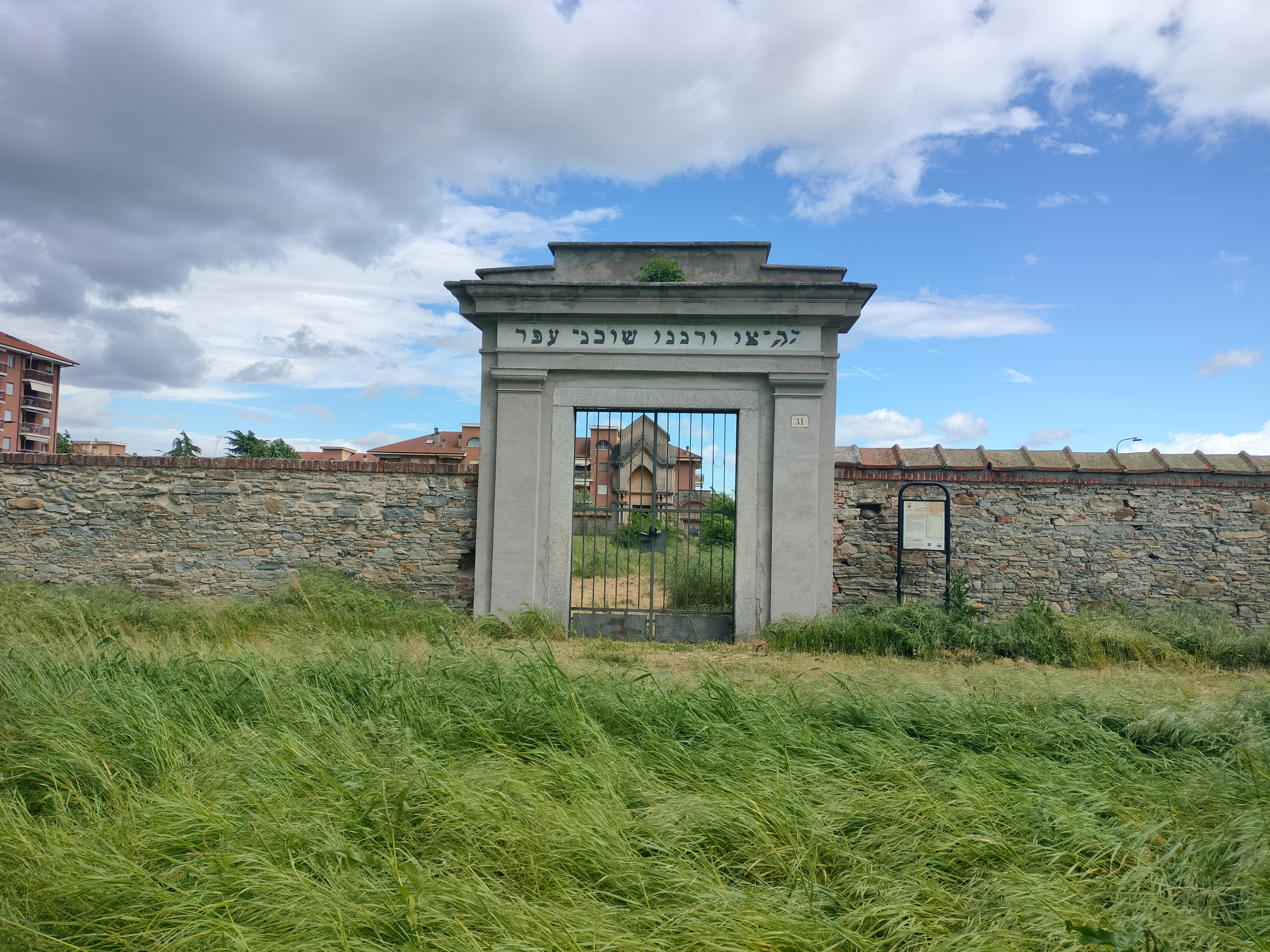
Jewish cemetery entrance in Acqui Terme, Italy. Inscription above: "May God comfort and grant rest to those who dwell in the dust"

A Jewish cemetery (Hebrew: בית עלמין beit almin or בית קברות beit kvarot) is a cemetery where Jews are buried in keeping with Jewish tradition. Cemeteries are referred to in several different ways in Hebrew, including beit kevarot (house of sepulchers), beit almin (eternal home), beit olam [haba] (house of afterlife), beit chayyim (house of the living) and beit shalom (house of peace).

The land of the cemetery is considered holy and a special consecration ceremony takes place upon its inauguration. According to Jewish tradition, Jewish burial grounds are sacred sites and must remain undisturbed in perpetuity. Establishing a cemetery is one of the first priorities for a new Jewish community. A Jewish cemetery is generally purchased and supported with communal funds. Placing small stones on graves is a Jewish tradition equivalent to bringing flowers or wreaths to graves. Flowers, spices, and twigs have sometimes been used, but the stone is preferred because in Jewish religion it is perceived specifically as a Jewish custom.

Showing proper respect for the dead (kevod ha-met) is intrinsic to Jewish law. The connection between the soul and the human body after death is an essential aspect of Jewish belief in the eternity of the soul. Thus, disinterring the dead, deriving benefit from a corpse or grave, or acting in any way that may be perceived as "ridiculing the helpless" (l'oeg l'rash), such as making derogatory remarks or joking, but also partaking in the pleasures or needs of the living, such as eating, drinking or smoking, are forbidden in the presence of the dead.

Showing proper respect for the dead also requires a prompt burial, the waiver of certain rabbinic restrictions on Shabbat and religious holidays to ensure proper care of the dead, the ritual cleaning (tahara) and dressing of the body in shrouds (tachrichim) before burial, as well laws concerning proper conduct in a cemetery. These obligations are traditionally understood as an expression of chesed shel emet (Hebrew: חֶסֶד שֶׁל אֱמֶת, “true kindness”), a Jewish ethical concept describing acts of kindness performed for the deceased, who cannot reciprocate. Care for the dead and the maintenance of burial grounds are therefore regarded as among the highest forms of communal responsibility in Jewish law and practice.

To ensure that the requirements for Jewish burial are met and that each member of the community is afforded a proper burial, Jewish communities establish burial societies known as the chevra kadisha, 'Holy Society', to provide these services free of charge. In larger Jewish communities, cemeteries are sometimes subdivided into sections according to the chevra kadisha that uses and is responsible for that section of the cemetery's care and upkeep.

== History ==
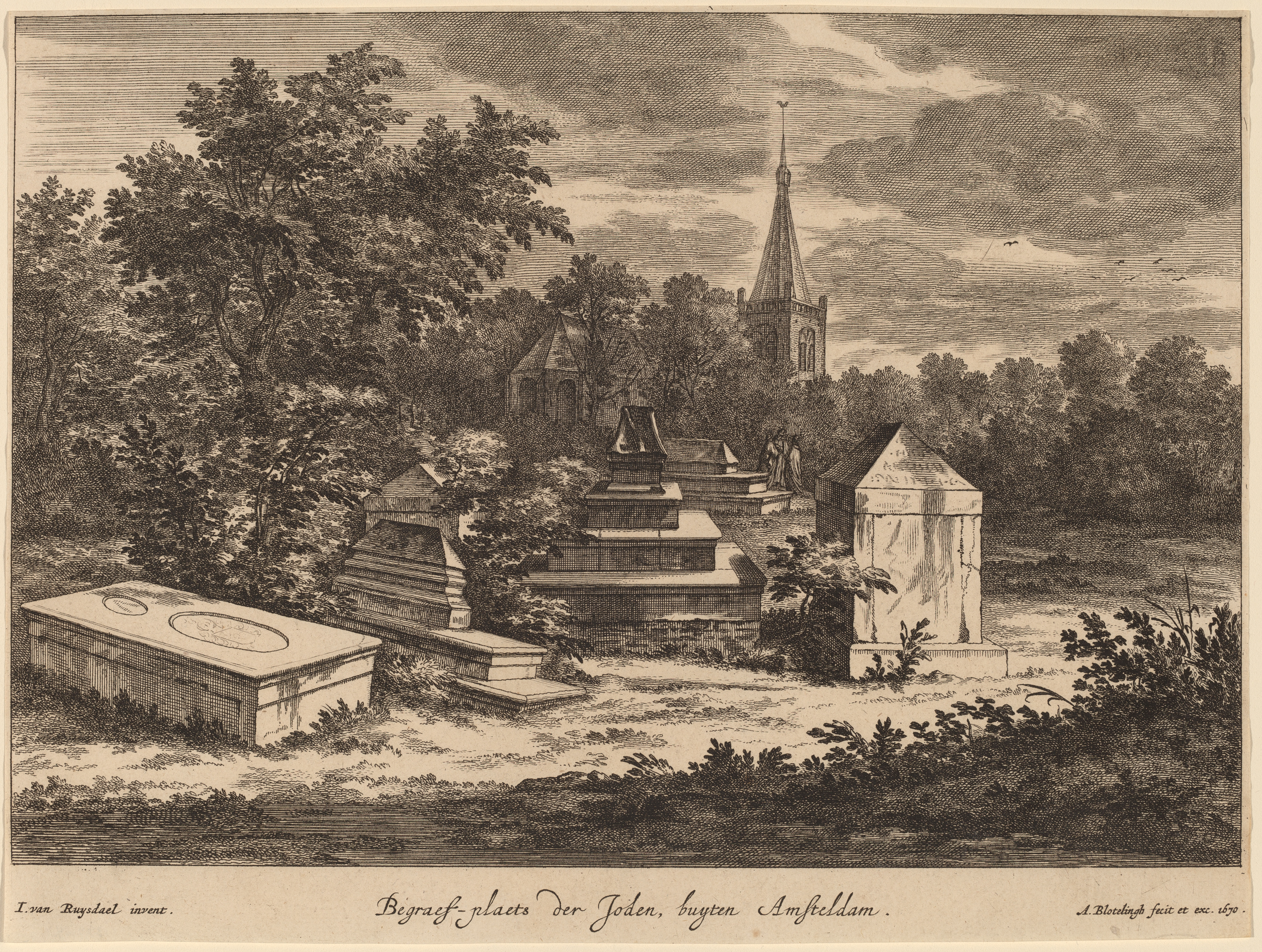
Abraham Blooteling, Jewish Cemetery outside Amsterdam

Early Jewish cemeteries were located outside of the city. In the Diaspora, it is traditional to bury the dead with the feet in the direction of Jerusalem. Some findings showed that the dead would be buried with a handful of soil from the Holy Land. The tombstones usually have inscriptions in Hebrew and the regional language. During the Nazi Germany regime, Jewish cemeteries all over Europe were destroyed and desecrated; for this reason, some cemeteries have therefore also become Holocaust memorials, such as the cemetery in the Warsaw Ghetto.

The Old Jewish Cemetery in Sarajevo, Bosnia and Herzegovina, is located on the slopes of Trebević mountain, in the Kovačići-Debelo Brdo area, and is the largest Jewish cemetery in Southeast Europe, and the second-largest sepulchral complex in Europe after the Old Jewish Cemetery in Prague. It was in use for approximately four hundred years, from the beginning of the 16th or 17th century, but most likely from 1630 until 1966.

Other large Jewish cemeteries of Europe can be found in the Kozma Street Cemetery of Budapest, the Jewish Cemetery of Łódź, the Okopowa Street Jewish Cemetery of Warsaw, the Zentralfriedhof in Vienna, the Weißensee Cemetery of Berlin, the Jewish Cemetery in Khotyn, Ukraine, and the Chatam Sofer Memorial (part of the Old Jewish Cemetery in Bratislava). The Jewish cemetery of Siret is considered one of the oldest cemeteries in Eastern Europe, with its foundation dated around 1500. Founded in 1832, the Jewish Cemetery of Coro in Venezuela is the oldest Jewish cemetery in continuous use in the Americas.

== Jewish cemetery projects ==
The mission of the International Jewish Cemetery Project is to document every Jewish burial site in the world.

The Lo Tishkach European Jewish Cemeteries Initiative was established in 2006 as a joint project of the Conference of European Rabbis and the Conference on Jewish Material Claims Against Germany. It aims to guarantee the effective and lasting preservation of Jewish cemeteries and mass graves throughout the European continent.

The ESJF European Jewish Cemeteries Initiative was established in 2015 as a German-based nonprofit. It received the initial grant of 1 million euros from German government in 2015 In November 2018 the EJSF received a European Union grant for a mass survey project of Jewish burial sites using drones. In December 2019 further funding was granted for a new 2019-2021 project "Protecting the Jewish cemeteries of Europe: Continuation of the mapping process, stakeholders’ involvement and awareness raising".

== See also ==
- Bereavement in Judaism
- Mount of Olives Jewish cemetery
- Category:Jewish cemeteries by country
- List of Jewish cemeteries in the United States
