= Jewish cemetery, Khotyn =

Cemetery in Khotyn, Ukraine

Coordinates: 48°31′48″N 26°29′14″E

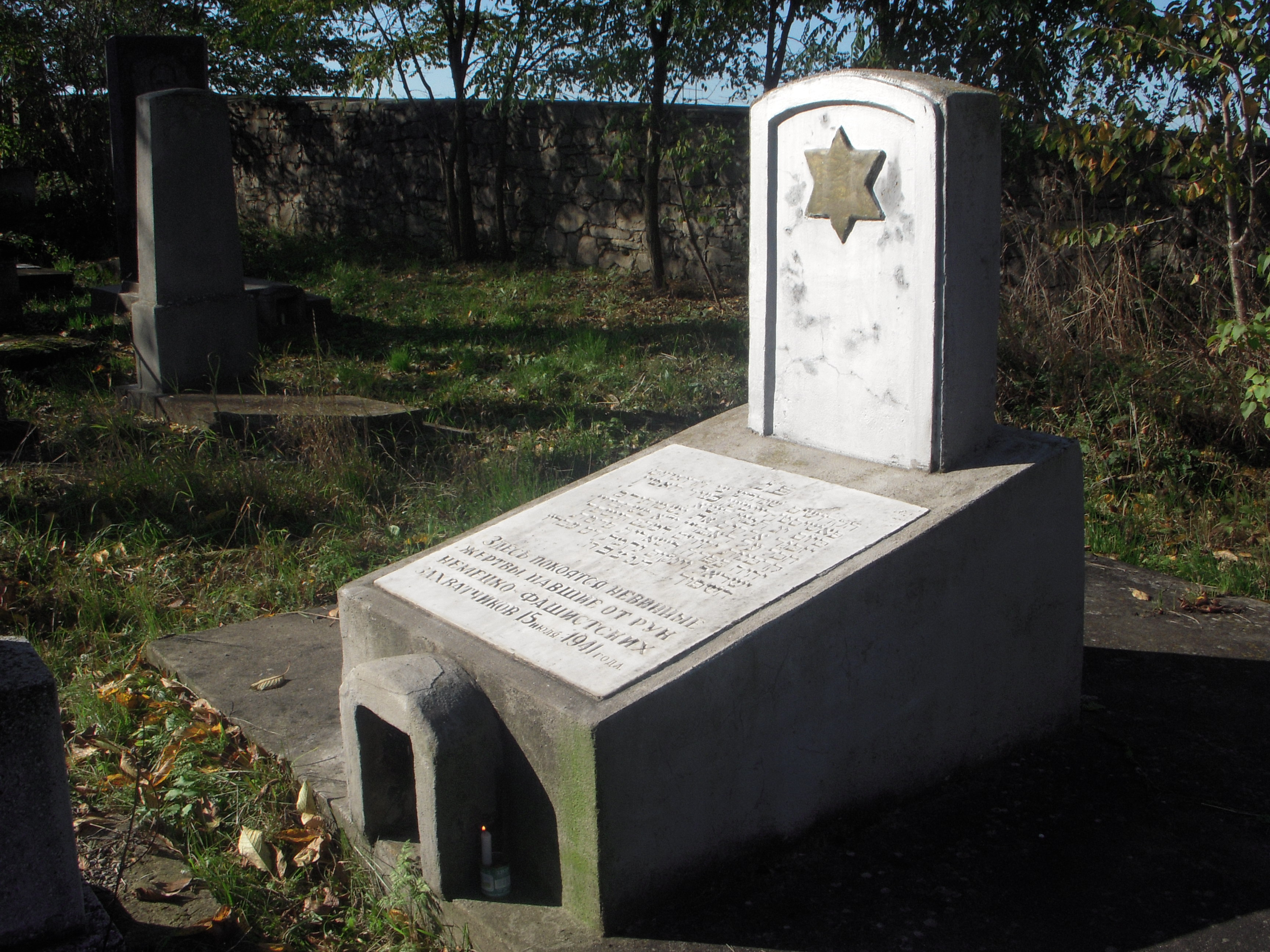
Mass Grave

The Jewish cemetery of Khotyn, Ukraine.

== Background ==
The city of Khotyn is located in the Chernivtsi oblast of Ukraine. According to the Encyclopedia of Ukraine, during the late 19th and early 20th centuries, the town was almost entirely Jewish or Russian. This created a uniformity of culture that endured throughout the different occupations of Khotyn (Bessarabia in the late 1800s, Austria during the 1910s, the Soviet Army in June 1940, Romania in 1941, and the USSR in 1944). The town in 1930 was composed of 38% Jews, and roughly the same percentage of Russians, Romanians and Ukrainians. However, after the 2nd World War, the Jewish percentage of the population fell to 8%. The current Jewish population of Khotyn is small; residents estimate the community at 10 people, and the U.S. Commission for the Preservation of America's Heritage Abroad estimates the population at 11-100.

== The cemetery ==
The US Government organisation "Commission for the Preservation of America's Heritage Abroad," cited above, provides an excellent reference for the Jewish cemeteries of Ukraine. The International Jewish Cemetery Project cites this source for its information. The document includes the following information about Khotyn:

KHOTIN:US Commission No. UA25060101 The last known Hasidic burial was 1990. No other towns or villages used this unlandmarked cemetery. The isolated suburban flat land has no sign or marker. Reached by turning directly off a public road, access is open to all. A broken masonry wall with no gate surrounds site. 501 to 5000 stones, most in original location with less than 25% of surviving stones toppled or broken, date from 19th to 20th century. Location of any removed tombstones is unknown. Some tombstones have traces of painting on their surfaces, portraits on stones, and/or metal fences around graves. The cemetery contains no known mass graves. The municipality owns the site used for Jewish cemetery only. Adjacent properties are agricultural. The cemetery boundaries are unchanged since 1939. Rarely, Jews or non-Jews visit. The cemetery was not vandalized in the last ten years. Local/municipal authorities cleared vegetation. Now, occasionally, individuals clean or clear. Within the limits of the cemetery are no structures. Vegetation overgrowth is a constant problem, disturbing graves. Water drainage at the cemetery is a seasonal problem. Serious threat: vegetation. Moderate threat: uncontrolled access, weather erosion and pollution. Slight threat: vandalism, and existing nearby development and proposed nearby development.

The cemetery can be reached easily by taxi from the Bus Station. The report suggests that the cemetery contains no mass graves; in fact, the location includes a monument to those Jewish citizens killed in the 1941 occupation.

== See also ==
- Khotyn
- Chernivtsi
- Jewish cemetery in Chernivtsi
