= 1968 Islip 300 =

Auto race held at Islip Speedway in 1968

Race details
- Race 26 of 49 in the 1968 NASCAR Grand National Series season
- Official ticket form for the 1968 Islip 300
- Date: July 7, 1968; 58 years ago
- Official name: Islip 300
- Location: Islip Speedway, (Islip, New York)
- Course: Permanent racing facility
- Course length: 0.200 miles (0.322 km)
- Distance: 250 laps, 60.0 mi (90.0 km)
- Weather: Temperatures ranging between 59 °F (15 °C) and 70.6 °F (21.4 °C); wind speeds of 14 miles per hour (23 km/h)
- Average speed: 48.561 miles per hour (78.151 km/h)
- Attendance: 4,600

Pole position
Driver	Buddy Baker	Ray Fox
- Time: 13.880

Most laps led
Driver	Richard Petty	Petty Enterprises
- Laps: 97

Winner
No. 2	Bobby Allison	J.D. Bracken

The 1968 Islip 300 was a NASCAR Grand National Series event that was held on July 7, 1968, at Islip Speedway in Islip, New York.

The transition to purpose-built racecars began in the early 1960s and occurred gradually over that decade. Changes made to the sport by the late 1960s brought an end to the "strictly stock" vehicles of the 1950s.

== Background ==
Islip Speedway was a .2-mile (320-meter) oval race track in Islip, New York which was open from 1947 until 1984. It is the smallest track ever to host NASCAR's Grand National Series, from 1964 to 1971. The first demolition derby took place at Islip Speedway in 1958. The idea was patented by Larry Mendelson, who worked at Islip Speedway.

== Race report ==
The race's advertised distance was 300 laps on a paved track spanning 0.200 miles (0.322 km). It took fifty-five minutes and seventeen seconds in order to complete the entire race. Starting at 8:15 p.m., the race was quickly over before 9:15 p.m. Speeds were considered to be 48.561 miles per hour (78.151 km/h) for the average and 51.873 miles per hour (83.482 km/h) for the pole. The race was attended by 4,600 spectators and they witnessed one caution for three laps. General admission for this event was only $4 plus sales taxes ($37.03 when adjusted for inflation) while children got in for only $1 with an adult general admission ($9.26 when adjusted for inflation).

The most notable crew chiefs to participate in this event were Ray Hicks, Eddie Allison, Jake Elder, Frankie Scott, Dale Inman and Harry Hyde.

Bobby Allison managed to defeat David Pearson by six car lengths. The track was shorter than even Martinsville Speedway; giving it the notoriety of being lapped by the leaders during the first ten four laps of a race. Start and park racing was a way to avoid demoralization in those circumstances as opposed to maintaining a profit margin. Most of the drivers drove the latest model of stock car automobiles to this race. Buddy Baker would perform in a 1968 Dodge Charger while Richard Petty raced around the track in a 1968 Plymouth GTX. Three years later, the uncertain economic climate of the early 1970s would necessitate start and park racing in order for lesser teams to remain as viable as possible.

Bobby Allison would receive $1,000 ($9,258 when adjusted for inflation) for winning the race while Gene Black would receive $100 ($926 when adjusted for inflation) for finishing in last place. Four different car manufacturers led the race and four different finished in the top four.

The total winnings for this race was $5,255 ($48,653 when adjusted for inflation). John Winger would make his NASCAR debut during this racing event.

=== Qualifying ===
Grid	No.	Driver	Manufacturer	Speed	Qualifying time	Owner
1	3	Buddy Baker	'68 Dodge	51.873	13.880	Ray Fox
2	17	David Pearson	'68 Ford	51.836	13.890	Holman-Moody
3	43	Richard Petty	'68 Plymouth	51.245	14.050	Petty Enterprises
4	48	James Hylton	'67 Dodge	50.883	14.150	Petty Enterprises
5	2	Bobby Allison	'66 Chevrolet	50.562	14.240	Donald Brackins
6	44	John Winger	'67 Ford	50.420	14.280	Richard Giachetti
7	49	G.C. Spencer	'67 Plymouth	50.314	14.310	G.C. Spencer
8	64	Elmo Langley	'67 Ford	49.896	14.430	Elmo Langley / Henry Woodfield
9	25	Jabe Thomas	'67 Ford	49.724	14.480	Don Robertson
10	4	John Sears	'66 Ford	49.450	14.560	L.G. DeWitt

Failed to qualify: Bob Cooper (#02), Dick Johnson (#18), Henley Gray (#19), Stan Meserve (#51), Bobby Mausgrover (#88)

== Finishing order ==
Section reference:

1. Bobby Allison (No. 2)
2. David Pearson† (No. 17)
3. Buddy Baker† (No. 3)
4. Richard Petty (No. 43)
5. James Hylton (No. 48)
6. Bobby Isaac† (No. 71)
7. Elmo Langley† (No. 64)
8. Clyde Lynn† (No. 20)
9. John Sears† (No. 4)
10. Neil Castles (No. 06)
11. Wendell Scott† (No. 34)
12. John Winger (No. 44)
13. Jabe Thomas (No. 25)
14. Buck Baker† (No. 87)
15. Ed Negre*† (No. 8)
16. Bill Vanderhoff* (No. 09)
17. Earl Brooks*† (No. 28)
18. Frank Warren* (No. 0)
19. J.D. McDuffie*† (No. 70)
20. G.C. Spencer*† (No. 49)
21. Bill Seifert* (No. 45)
22. Roy Tyner*† (No. 76)
23. Paul Dean Holt* (No. 01)
24. David Mote* (No. 69)
25. Gene Black*† (No. 75)

† signifies that the driver is known to be deceased
* Driver failed to finish race

== Timeline ==
Section reference:

- Start of race: Buddy Baker started the race with the pole position.
- Lap 17: Gene Black's transmission became problematic, making him the last-place finisher.
- Lap 29: The shocks on David Mote's vehicle started acting up, forcing him to withdraw from the race.
- Lap 62: Paul Dean Holt quit the race for personal reasons.
- Lap 74: Oil pressure issues forced Roy Tyner into the sidelines for the remainder of the race.
- Lap 96: Richard Petty takes over the lead from Buddy Baker.
- Lap 109: Bill Seifert quit the race for personal reasons.
- Lap 110: G.C. Spencer lost the rear end of his vehicle, his day on the track was brought to a premature end.
- Lap 127: The vehicle of J.D. McDuffie developed brake problems, causing him to exit the event.
- Lap 160: Frank Warren's vehicle developed a faulty fuel pump, forcing him off the track.
- Lap 191: Earl Brooks quit the race for personal reasons.
- Lap 193: David Pearson takes over the lead from Richard Petty.
- Lap 230: Bill Vanderhoff's vehicle developed brake problems, forcing him out of the race.
- Lap 231: Ed Negre's vehicle lost its rear end, causing him to become the final DNF for this event.
- Lap 273: Bobby Allison takes over the lead from David Pearson.
- Finish: Bobby Allison was officially declared the winner of the event.

Preceded by 1968 Firecracker 400	NASCAR Grand National Season; 1968	Succeeded by 1968 Maine 300
