= Willowdale, Toronto =

Willowdale
- Neighbourhood
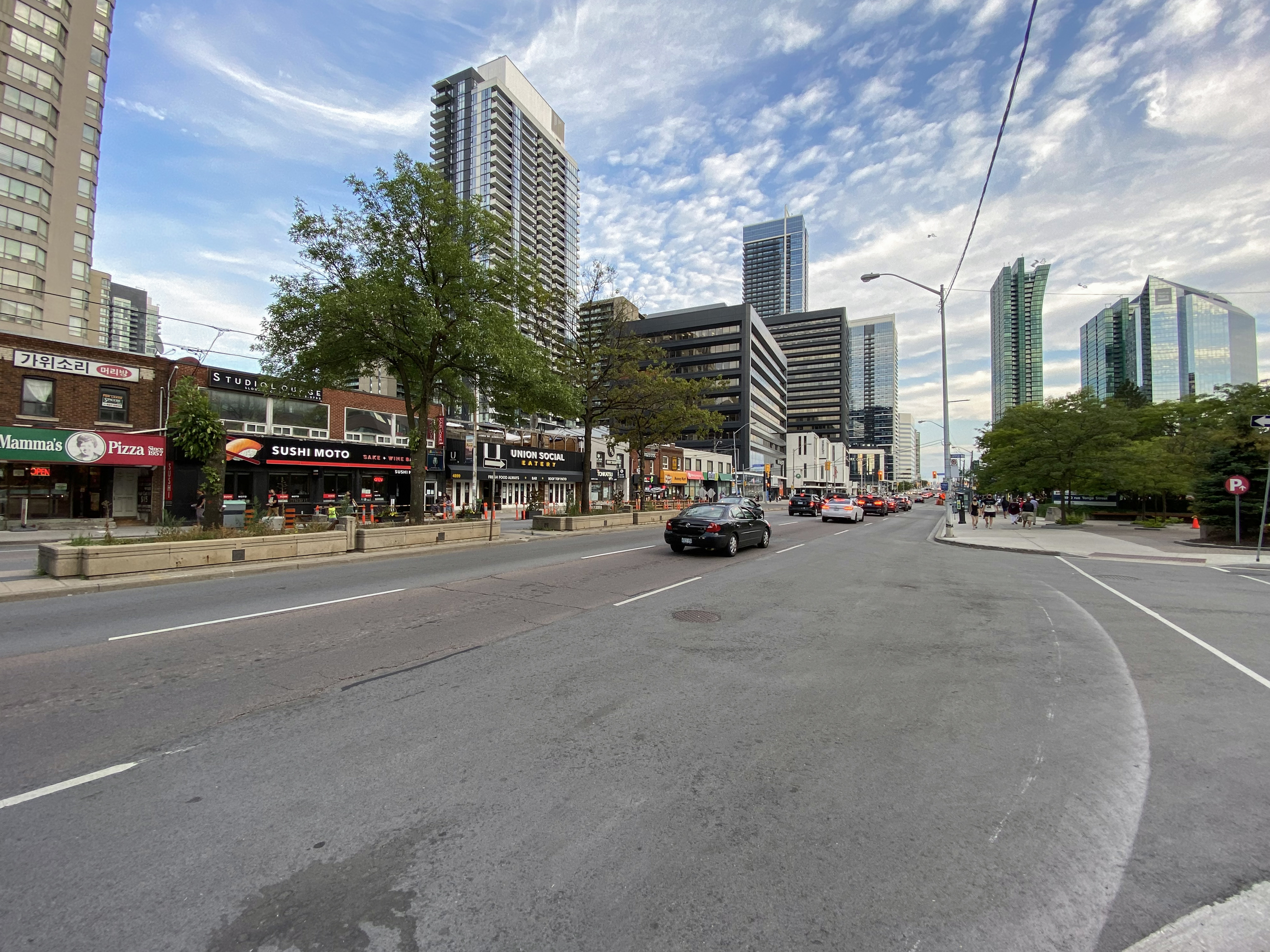
- View of Willowdale looking South from Upper Madison Avenue and Yonge Street

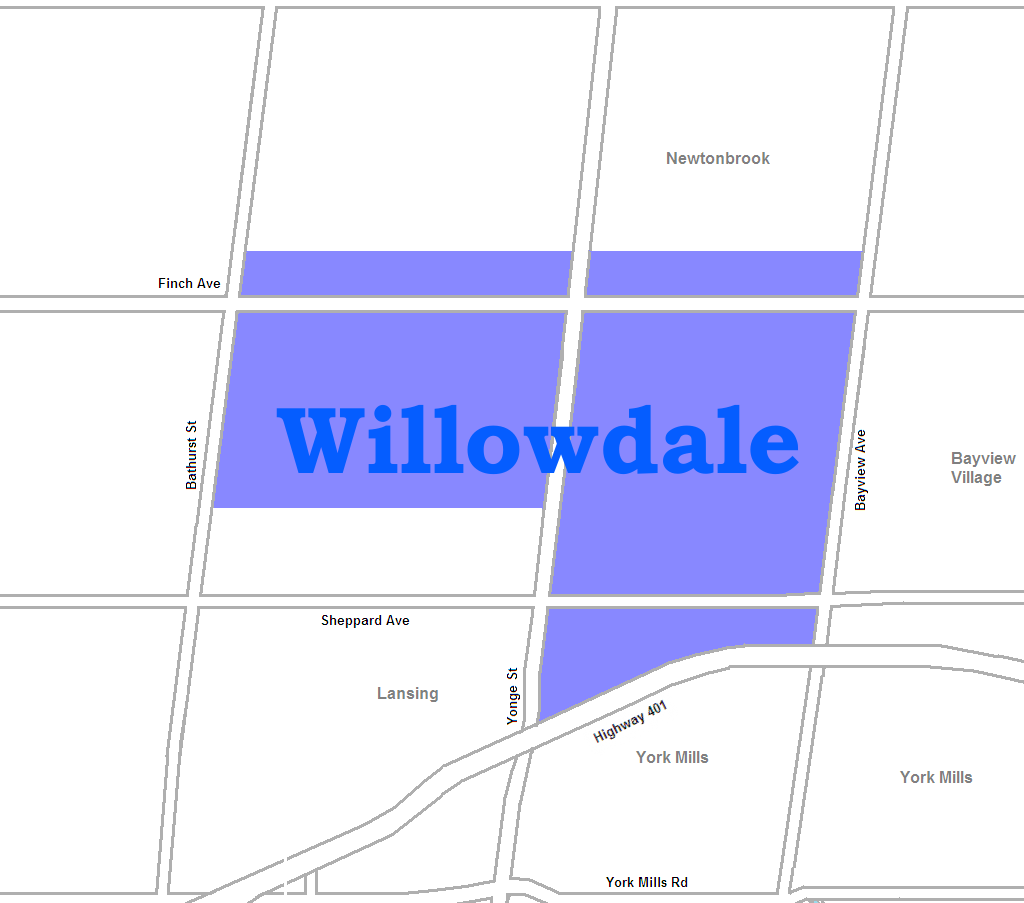

- Location within Toronto
- Coordinates: 43°47′14″N 79°25′46″W
- Country: Canada
- Province: Ontario
- City: Toronto
- Municipality established: 1850 York Township
- Changed municipality: 1922 North York from York Township; 1998 Toronto from North York

Willowdale is a neighbourhood in the city of Toronto, Ontario, Canada, located in the district and former township of North York. It developed from three postal villages: Newtonbrook, Willowdale and Lansing.

Willowdale began as a postal village (originally Willow Dale) which covered the area from Finch Avenue at the north to Elmwood Ave at the south and Bathurst Street at the west to Bayview Avenue at the east. The village of Lansing was from Elmwood Ave. at the north to approximately Hwy. 401 at the south and Bathurst St. at the west to Bayview Ave. At the east. (East of Bayview Ave. was the village of Oriole.) The north–south center line of both Lansing and Willowdale was Yonge Street. The postal village of Lansing remained in existence until the post office at Lansing corner (northwest corner of Yonge St. and Sheppard Ave.) was closed. When a new post office was built in Willowdale, the postal addresses of Lansing and Willowdale were combined as the new postal village of Willowdale, within the Township of North York.

North York City Centre is centered at the intersection of Yonge Street and Empress Avenue/Park Home Avenue and is commonly thought to be the core of Willowdale, as well as North York itself. Its high-rise residential and commercial development sets it apart from much of the rest of Willowdale. The Willowdale neighbourhood consists of single-family homes, condominium townhouses and high-rise condominium towers. High density development is restricted to along Yonge Street.

== History ==
Willowdale was first settled by Jacob Cummer (Jacob Kummer), who immigrated to Canada from the United States in 1797. Cummer was a mill owner on the nearby Don River, a proprietor of a tinsmith shop on Yonge Street and a self-trained doctor and veterinarian. Cummer Avenue is named for Cummer.

David Gibson, a distinguished land surveyor, was another leader in this community. Like most of his neighbours, Gibson participated in the ill-fated Upper Canada Rebellion of 1837. He was thus charged with high treason and escaped to the United States, where he found employment as the First Assistant Engineer on the building of the Erie Canal.

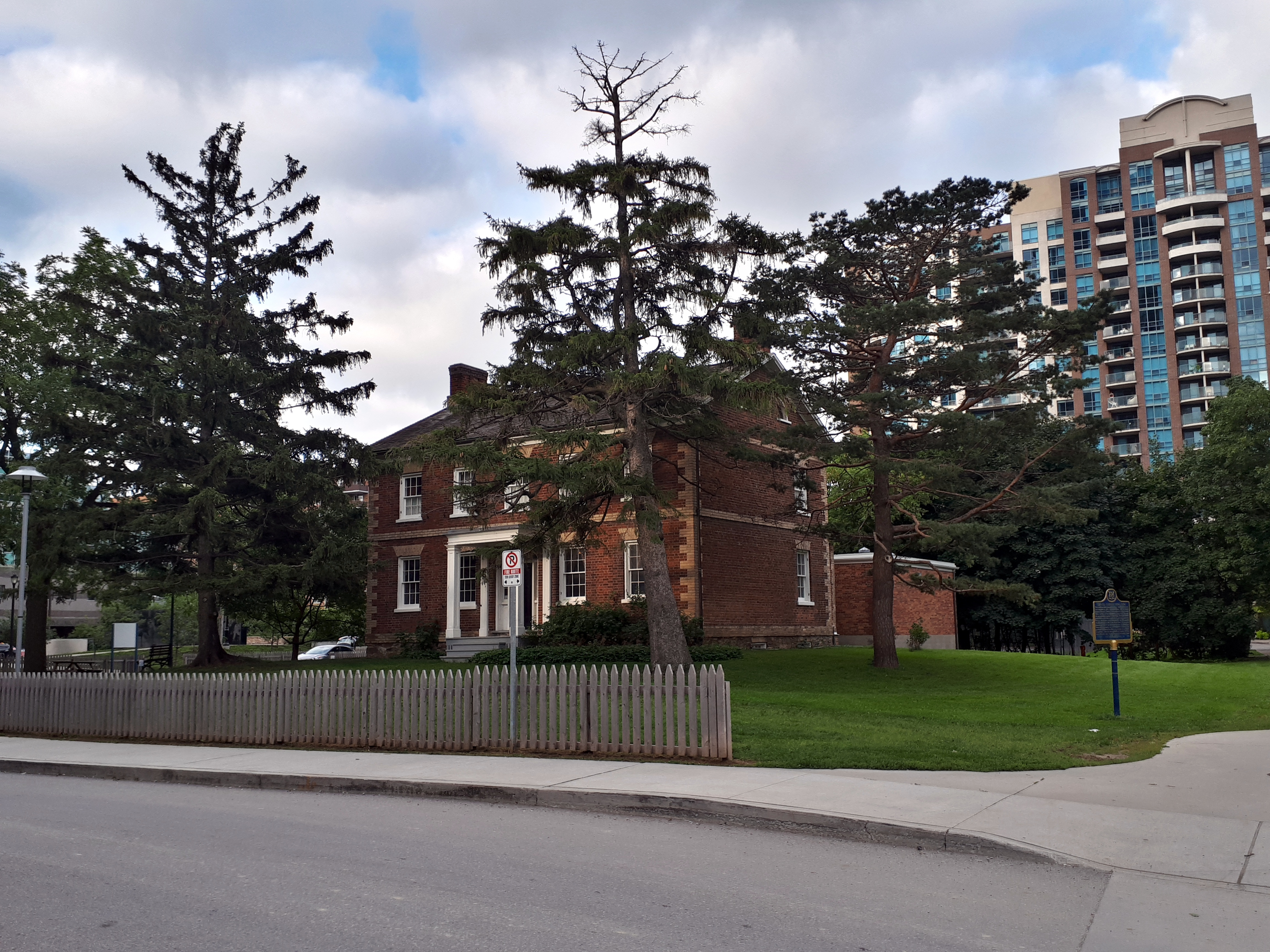
The Gibson family built the Gibson House in Willowdale in 1851.

Gibson returned to his Yonge Street farm in 1851, after being pardoned for his role in the Rebellion. He then helped to establish the "Willow Dale" post office, named after the many willow trees that once graced this district. Members of the Gibson family were still living in Gibson House in the 1920s when the residential subdivision of Willowdale began to take place. The Gibson House, built in 1851 in the Georgian Revival style, still stands in its original location at 5172 Yonge Street, and is now a historic house museum.

Opened in 1948, York Cemetery was located in the southwest of the neighbourhood. Several notable individuals are interred there, including the Grand Duchess Olga Alexandrovna of Russia, and Tim Horton. The single-family homes range in age from the original 1910 to 1950s construction (one- and two-storey pre-war houses and modest one-and-a-half-storey postwar houses).

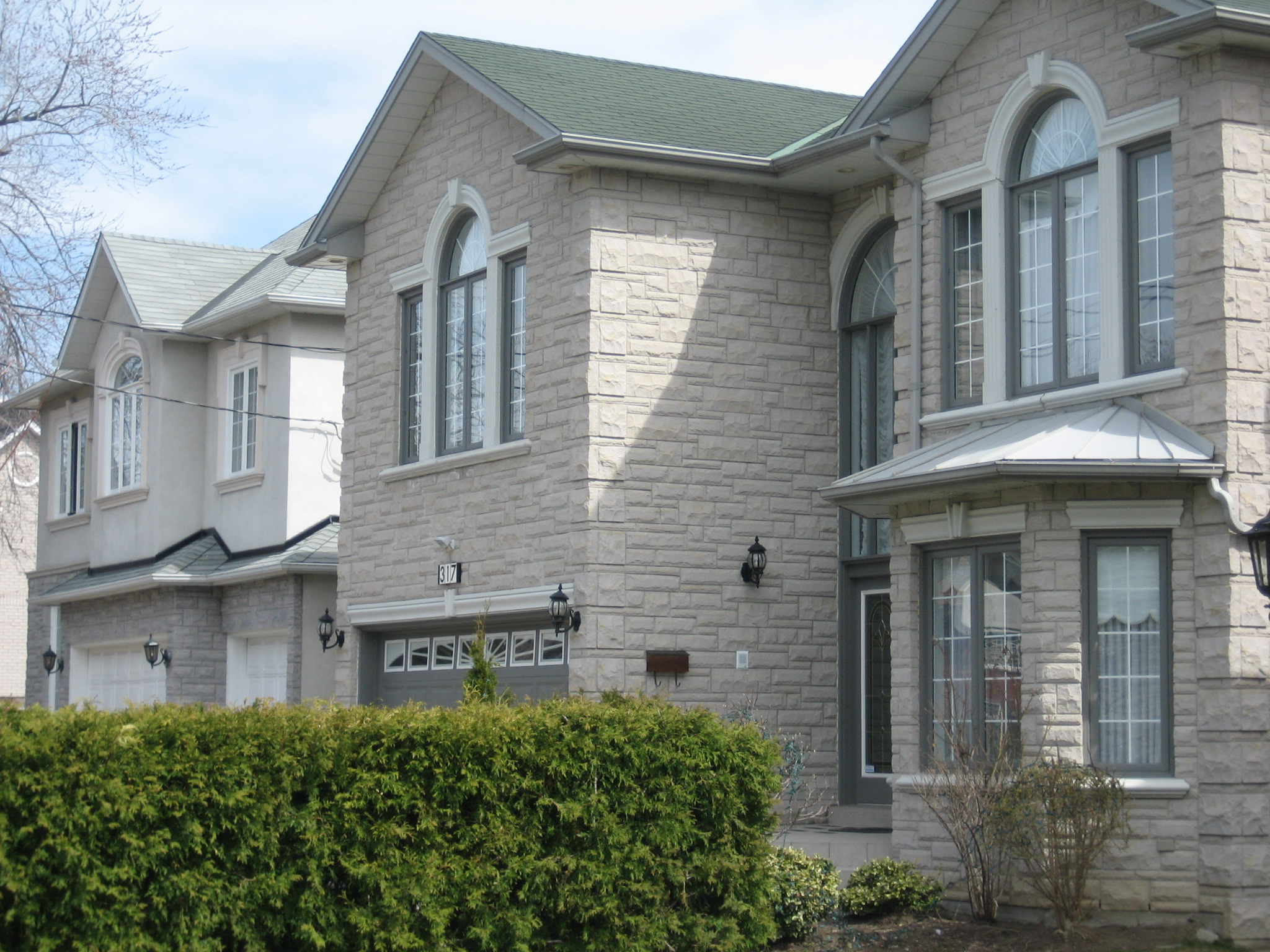
Large two-storey luxury homes emerged in the neighbourhood in the early-1990s, replacing many of the older houses.

Beginning on a large scale in the 1990s, very large replacement two-storey luxury homes were constructed on lots originally occupied by smaller houses. It is in this neighbourhood that the term "monster homes" was first applied by Torontonians.

In 2018, the Toronto van attack, the deadliest vehicle ramming attack in Canadian history, occurred in Willowdale.

=== Willowdale United Church ===
This church (Cummer Chapel) was built on the northeast corner at Church and Yonge St. In at least the early 1920s, the northwest corner was occupied by St George's Anglican Church. The first church in Willowdale was called the Cummer Chapel, located at the northwest corner of what is now Yonge and Churchill. This log meeting house was built in 1816 by Jacob Cummer on part of his farm. He and other early members of the church are buried in the cemetery which remains on the site, now on the east side of Yonge Street. The Cummers, who were the first German loyalists and farmers from Pennsylvania, had Lutheran roots. However, they readily mixed in with and married people with Methodist and other roots. Thus the chapel was designated as non-denominational.

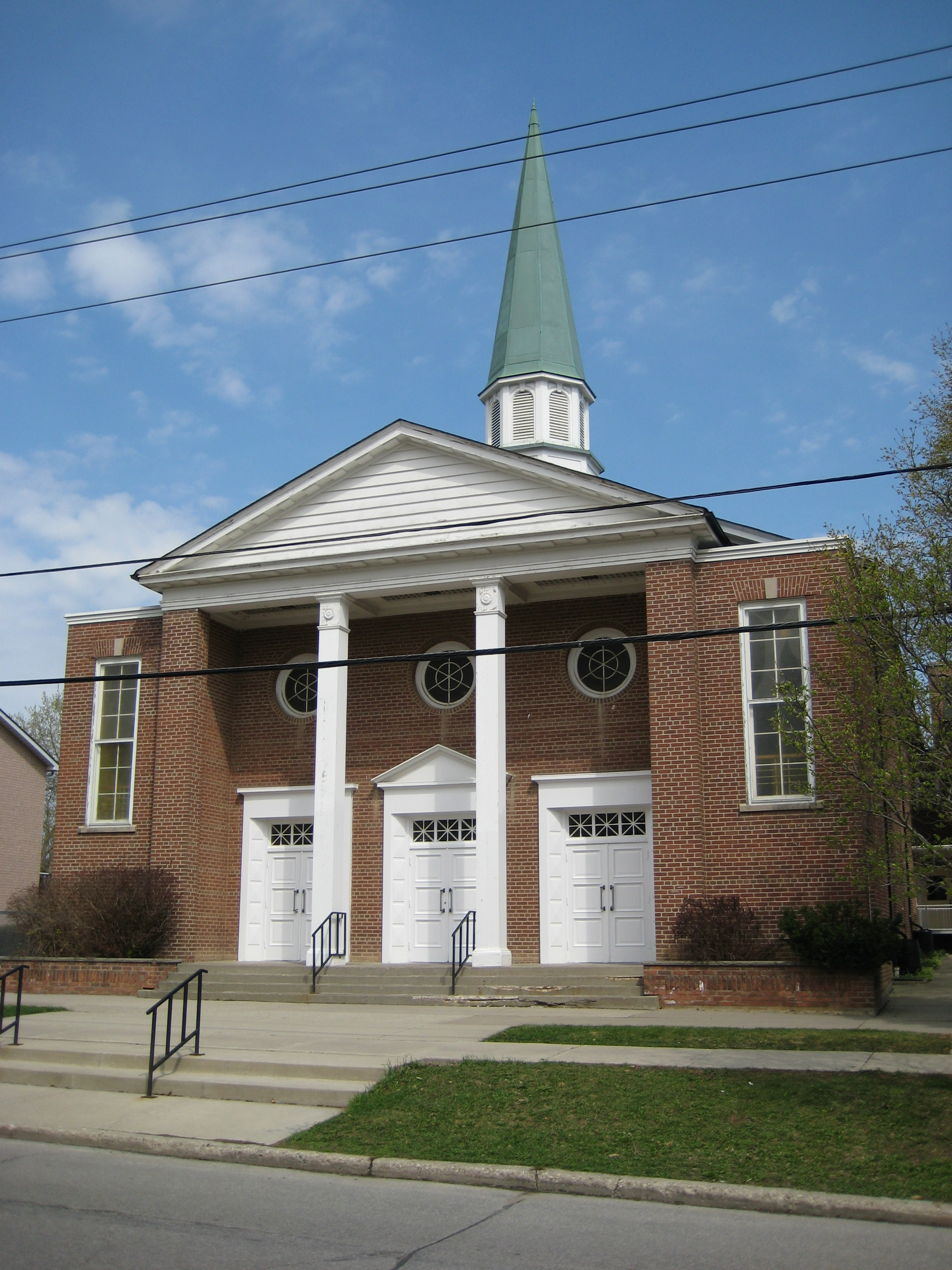
The current building for Willowdale United Church was erected in 1954.

A large, yellow, brick and stucco church with a tall spire replaced the log building in 1856. It was called the Methodist Episcopal Church, and became part of the new United Church of Canada in 1925. Between 1931 and 1932, Yonge Street was widened and the front end of the church, facing west, was removed. The front door was relocated to the south side of the building. Following World War II, many veterans and their families began to settle in Willowdale. In 1946, the Rev. Welburn Jones became the minister of Willowdale United Church (WUC) and initiated a building program. In 1954 a substantial building was built on nearby Kenneth Avenue.

In 1966, his successor, the Rev. Lindsay G. King, completed the program. The Rev. King spent the rest of his ministry, 27 years, at WUC. While he was the minister of WUC, the Rev. King wrote a regular column for the community paper and he was frequently heard on radio and television, including the CTV and the CBC. Because of his lifelong interest in bringing psychology, religion and health together, in 1973 he initiated the founding of the Family Life Foundation (FLF) of Willowdale, a registered charity encouraging the development of healthy community and family life.

== Demographics ==
The Willowdale ward population is 118,800 with growth of 8.3% from 2011 census, Willowdale is an ethnically diverse community, with 70% of all Willowdale residents being immigrants as of 2021. Major ethnic groups in Willowdale include: Chinese: 22%, Korean: 9.35%, and Iranian: 8.77%.

While English is the mother tongue for 31.4% of the population, other languages with large numbers of speakers include: Chinese: 12.3%, Persian: 11.1%, and Korean: 8.9%.

Willowdale number of households stand 49,955 where 43% of houses are constructed between 2001 and 2016. 61% of residents are home owners and 39% renters. Majority of the dwellings equal to 61.2% are apartment building that has over 5 or more storeys and 24.5% single-detached houses.

== Cityscape ==
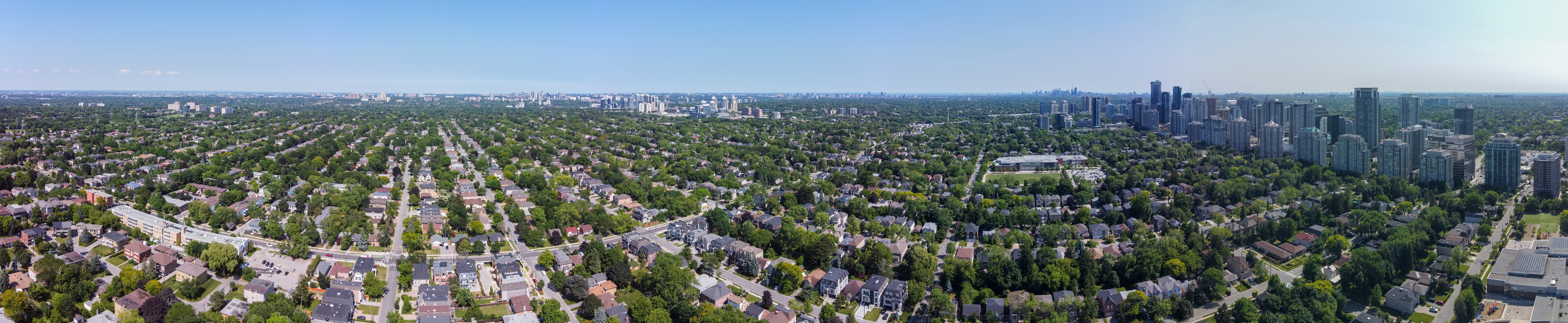
Aerial view of East Willowdale in 2023

== Education ==
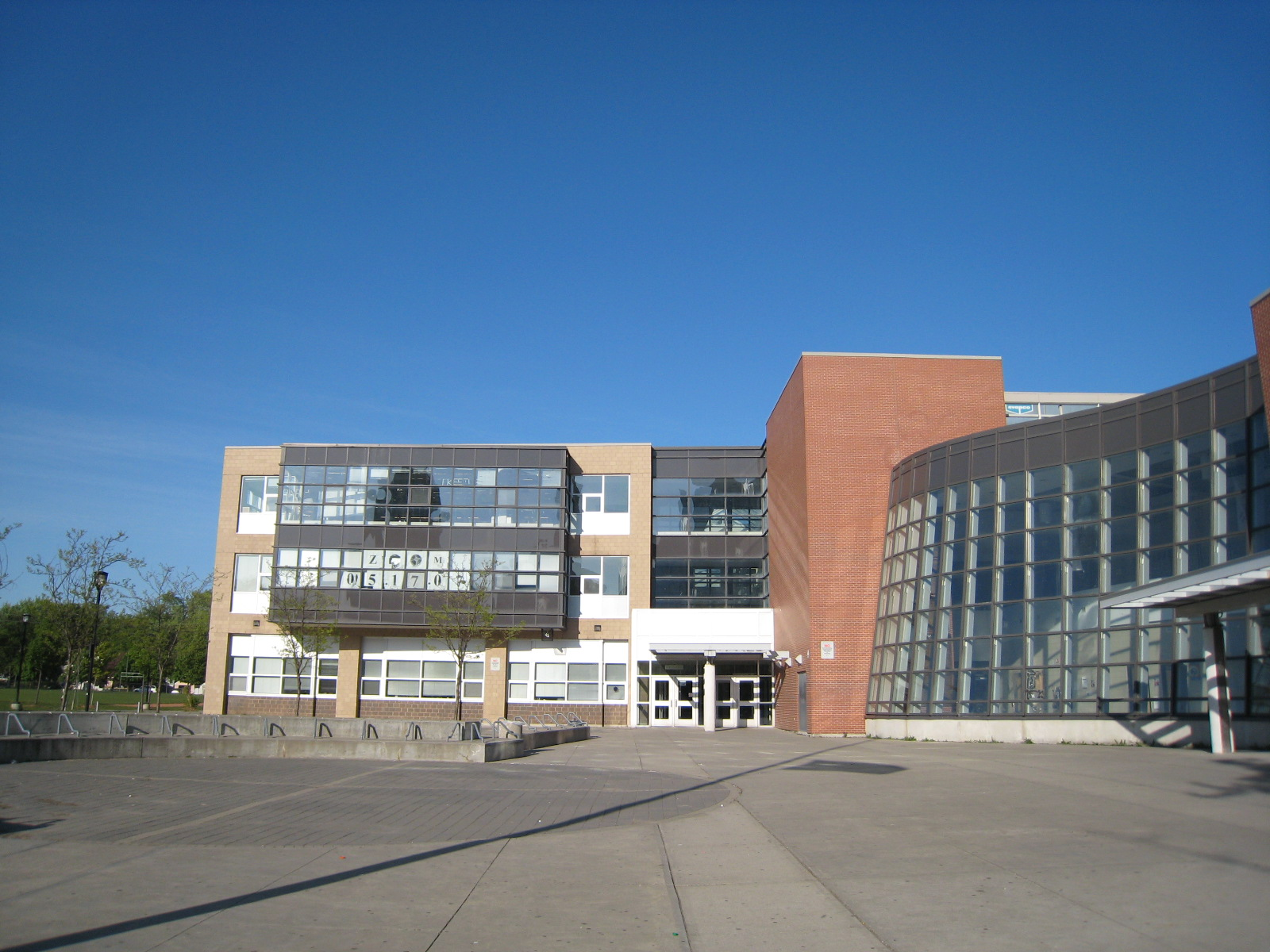
Earl Haig Secondary School is a public secondary school located in Willowdale.

Two public school boards operate schools in Willowdale, the separate Toronto Catholic District School Board (TCDSB), and the secular Toronto District School Board (TDSB). The headquarters for both TCDSB, and TDSB is located in the neighbourhood.

Both TCDSB, and TDSB operate public elementary and middle schools in the neighbourhood. TCDSB and TDSB institutions that offer primary education include:

- Avondale Public School (TDSB)
- Churchill Public School (TDSB)
- Cardinal Carter Academy of Arts (TCDSB)
- Claude Watson School for the Arts (TDSB)
- Finch Public School (TDSB)
- Hollywood Public School (TDSB)
- McKee Public School (TDSB)
- St. Antoine Daniel Separate School (TCDSB)
- St. Cyril Separate School (TCDSB)
- St. Edward Separate School (TCDSB)
- St. Gabriel Catholic School (TCDSB)
- Willowdale Middle School (TDSB)
- Yorkview Public School (TDSB)
- Cummer Valley Middle School (TDSB)

TDSB operates two secondary schools in the neighbourhood: Earl Haig Secondary School and Drewry Secondary School. TCDSB operates a specialized arts focused school (grades 7–12) in the neighbourhood, with other TCDSB secondary school students residing in Willowdale attending institutions in adjacent neighbourhoods. The French-first language public secular school board, Conseil scolaire Viamonde, and it separate counterpart, Conseil scolaire catholique MonAvenir also offer schooling to applicable residents of Willowdale. Monseigneur-de-Charbonnel is a French-Language Catholic school (grades 7–12) operated by Conseil Scholaire de District Catholique Centre Sud, located on Drewry Avenue. Others can attend CSCM/CSV schools situated in other neighbourhoods in Toronto.

== Recreation ==
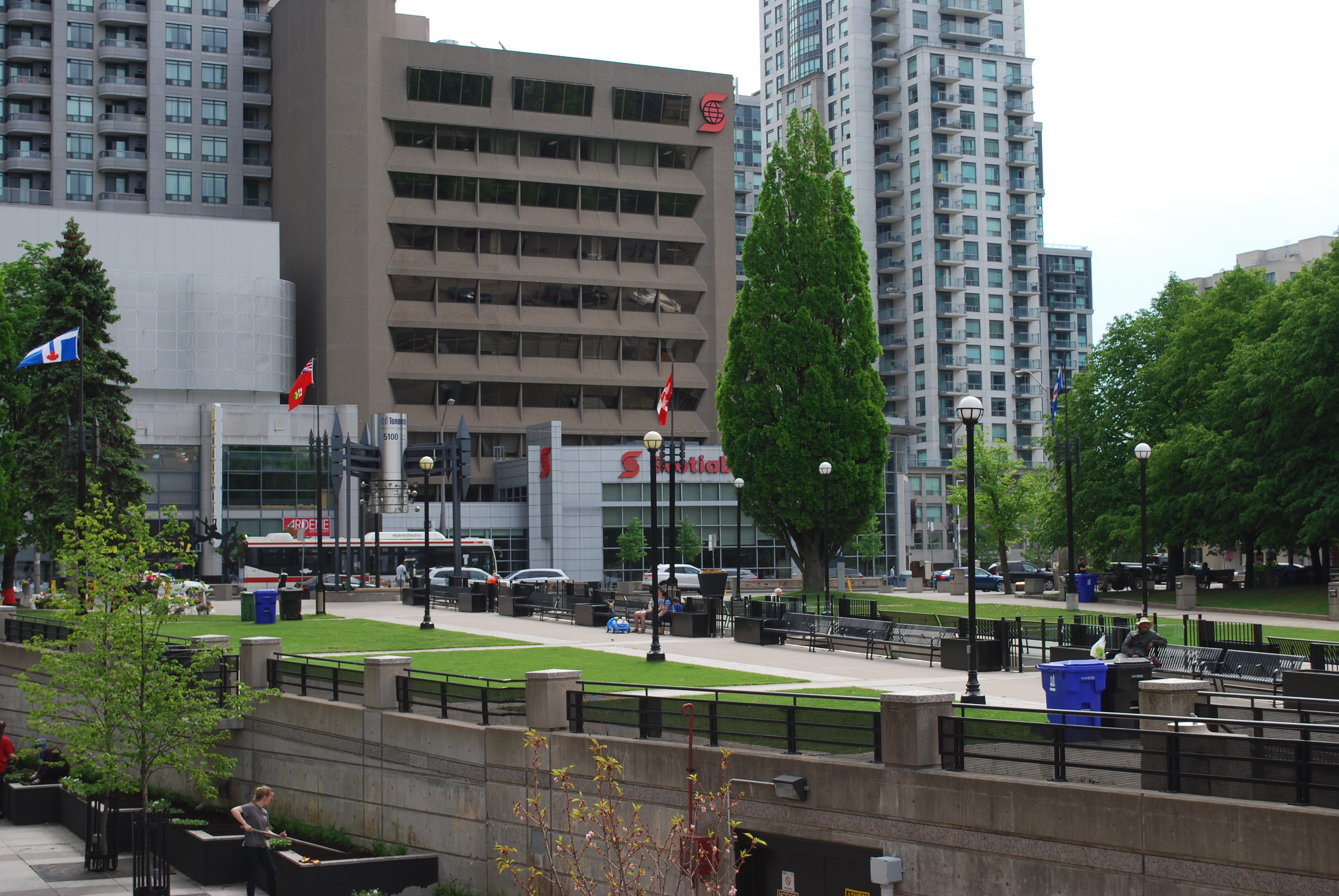
A view of Mel Lastman Square, a public square near Yonge Street.

The neighbourhood is home to several public parks, including Bathurst Park, Edithvale Park, Finch Avenue Hydro Corridor, and Sheppard East Park. Parks in Willowdale are managed by the Toronto Parks, Forestry and Recreation Division. In addition to municipal parks, the City of Toronto government also manages North York Central Library, a branch of the Toronto Public Library. Located on Yonge Street, Mel Lastman Square is a public square that hosts a number of events. The square is situated next to North York Civic Centre, a building used by the municipal government. Toronto Centre for the Arts is also located nearby.

In addition to public amenities, the neighbourhood is also home to Empress Walk, a condominium and retail complex that includes an IMAX cinema operated by Cineplex Entertainment.

== Transport ==
Several major roadways are situated in the neighbourhood. Yonge Street is a major north–south roadway, and a major commercial thoroughfare in Toronto. Bathurst Street serves as the neighbourhood's western boundary, whereas Bayview Avenue serve as the neighbourhood's eastern boundary. The neighbourhood's northern boundary is the Finch Avenue Hydro Corridor, situated just north of Finch Avenue. The southeastern part of the neighbourhood is bounded by Highway 401, a major east–west controlled access highway that passes through Greater Toronto. Other major roadways in the neighbourhood include Sheppard Avenue, an east–west thoroughfare.

=== Public transportation ===
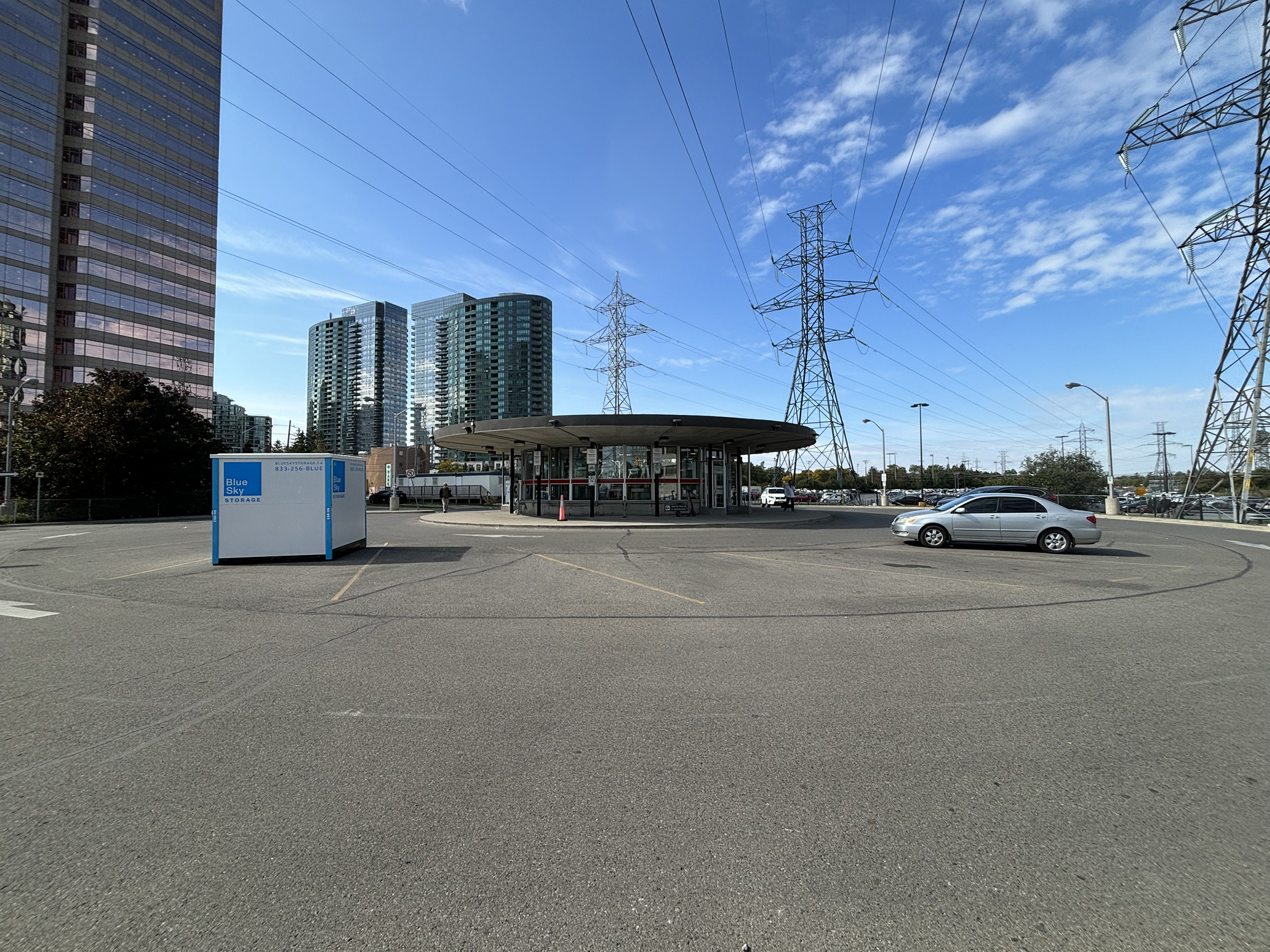
Finch station's kiss and ride entrance is located in the northern portion of Willowdale.

Public transportation in Willowdale is served by the GO Transit, the Toronto Transit Commission (TTC), and York Region Transit (YRT). The TTC operates several transit services in the neighbourhood such as the Toronto subway. There are four subway stations situated in Willowdale, Bayview, Finch, North York Centre, and Sheppard–Yonge station. Bayview station provides access to the Line 4 Sheppard subway, whereas Finch, and North York Centre stations provide access to Line 1 Yonge–University. Sheppard–Yonge station serves as a major interchange station for Line 1 and Line 4.

In addition to the subway, the TTC also operates bus routes in Willowdale. TTC buses may be accessed at subway stations, and bus stops located throughout the neighbourhood. In addition to the TTC, bus routes operated by GO Transit and York Region Transit may be accessed at Finch, and Sheppard–Yonge station.

== Notable people ==
- Andy Borodow (born 1969), Olympic wrestler
- Joseph Boyden, author
- Dean and Dan Caten, luxury fashion designers, founders of Italian fashion house DSQUARED2
- Geddy Lee, bassist, keyboardist and lead singer of progressive rock band Rush
- Alex Lifeson, lead guitar player of progressive rock band Rush
- David Clayton-Thomas, singer for Blood, Sweat & Tears
- Dream Warriors, hip hop group
- Frog Fagan, NASCAR Winston Cup Series driver
- Corey Haim, actor who starred in The Lost Boys
- Jimenez Lai, architect, lived on Cummer Avenue
- Henry Lau, singer, musician, and actor
- Howie Mandel, comedian, actor, television host, and voice actor
- Kirk McLean, ice hockey player
- Mark Napier, ice hockey player
- Vic Parsons, racing driver
- Haralds Puntulis, convicted of Nazi war crimes in 1965, in absentia, whilst living in Willowdale
- Lloyd Robertson, O.C., chief news anchor and senior editor of CTV News with Lloyd Robertson
- Seymour Schulich, businessman and philanthropist
- Dick Shatto, Canadian Football League player
- Steve Shutt, ice hockey player
- Harland Williams, comedian

== In popular culture ==
- The opening line of the song "The Necromancer" by Rush is: "As grey traces of dawn tinge the eastern sky, the three travelers, men of Willowdale [or Willow Dale], emerge from the forest shadow". Two of the three travelers is a reference to Geddy Lee and Alex Lifeson, both of whom grew up in Willowdale.

== See also ==
- Willowdale (federal electoral district)
- Willowdale (provincial electoral district)
