= 1969 Motor State 500 =

Auto race held at Michigan International Speedway in 1969

Race details
- Race 24 of 54 in the 1969 NASCAR Grand National Series season
- 1969 Motor State 500 program cover
- Date: June 15, 1969
- Official name: Motor State 500
- Location: Michigan International Speedway, Brooklyn, Michigan
- Course: Permanent racing facility
- Course length: 2.000 miles (3.219 km)
- Distance: 250 laps, 500 mi (804.672 km)
- Weather: Temperatures of 63 °F (17 °C); wind speeds of 15 miles per hour (24 km/h)
- Average speed: 139.254 mph (224.108 km/h)
- Attendance: 46,238

Pole position
Driver	Donnie Allison	Banjo Matthews

Most laps led
Driver	LeeRoy Yarbrough	Junior Johnson & Associates
- Laps: 136

Winner
No. 21	Cale Yarborough	Wood Brothers Racing

Television in the United States
- Network: CBS
- Announcers: Bud Lindemann

The 1969 Motor State 500 was a NASCAR Grand National Series event that was held on June 15, 1969, at Michigan International Speedway in Brooklyn, Michigan. Highlights from this event were featured on the television show Car and Track; hosted by race commentator Bud Lindemann.

== Background ==
Michigan International Speedway is a four-turn superspeedway that is 2 miles (3.2 km) long. Groundbreaking took place on September 28, 1967. Over 2.5 million cubic yards (1.9×10^{6} m^{3}) of dirt were moved to form the D-shaped oval. The track opened in 1968 with a total capacity of 25,000 seats. The track was originally built and owned by Lawrence H. LoPatin, a Detroit-area land developer who built the speedway at an estimated cost of $4–6 million. Financing was arranged by Thomas W Itin. Its first race took place on Sunday, October 13, 1968, with the running of the USAC 250 mile Championship Car Race won by Ronnie Bucknum.

== Race report ==
38 drivers competed in this 250-lap event. Wayne Gillette Was the last-place finisher due to troubles with the rear end of the vehicle after completing a single lap. While LeeRoy Yarbrough would lead the most laps, Cale Yarborough would defeat David Pearson by five car lengths after more than three and a half hours of racing. Cale Yarborough and LeeRoy Yarbrough got together during the final lap and LeeRoy tried to limp back to the finish line but came up just short.

A faulty vehicular oil line managed to take Buddy Young out of the race on lap 62. Bobby Wawak fell out with engine failure on lap 74 while Bobby Allison did the same thing on lap 78. Dick Johnson noticed that his vehicle's clutch was having problems; forcing him to leave the race on lap 80. Between lap 94 and lap 150, five of the competing drivers would notice that their engines stopped working. Some faulty lug bolts would relegate Ben Arnold to the sidelines on lap 155. Bill Seifert, Paul Deal Holt, Dave Marcis and Henley Gray would end up blowing their engines between lap 183 and lap 191. Yarbrough's day would end when his car suddenly crashed on lap 249; but not without picking up a respectable fourth-place finish in the process.

Donnie Allison would become known as the fastest driver in qualifying; he earned his pole position after driving speeds up to 160.135 miles per hour (257.712 km/h) by himself on the track. Earl Brooks would become known for being the lowest-finishing driver to complete the event; he was 85 laps behind the lead lap drivers. The vehicles in this event ranged from 1967 to 1969; most of the vehicles raced here were Fords and Dodges; all built nearby in the assembly plants of Dearborn, Flint and Detroit. The racing grid was forced to slow down a total of seven times for a duration of 35 laps; more than 46,000 people would purchase tickets for the inaugural NASCAR Cup Series race set in the "Irish Hills" of Michigan. LeeRoy Yarbrough and David Pearson both lead a respectable number of green flags and were tough opponents to deal with while under pressure. With the first-place position being exchanged a whopping 35 times throughout the event, it felt more like an Academy Award-winning movie than an actual NASCAR event.

Individual race earnings for each driver ranged from the winner's share of $17,625 ($151,124 when adjusted for inflation) to the last-place finisher's share of $622 ($5,333 when adjusted for inflation). A total of $73,548 in winnings went to all the drivers ($630,631 when adjusted for inflation).

Notable crew chiefs attending this race included Cotton Owens, Dick Hutcherson, Glen Wood, Banjo Matthews and Dale Inman.

=== Qualifying ===
Grid	No.	Driver	Manufacturer
1	27	Donnie Allison	'69 Ford
2	98	LeeRoy Yarbrough	'69 Mercury
3	71	Bobby Isaac	'69 Dodge
4	21	Cale Yarborough	'69 Mercury
5	43	Richard Petty	'69 Ford
6	6	Charlie Glotzbach	'69 Dodge
7	17	David Pearson	'69 Ford
8	99	Paul Goldsmith	'69 Dodge
9	22	Bobby Allison	'69 Dodge
10	32	Dick Brooks	'69 Plymouth
11	4	John Sears	'69 Ford
12	03	Richard Brickhouse	'67 Plymouth
13	61	Hoss Ellington	'67 Mercury
14	64	Elmo Langley	'68 Ford
15	15	Ed Hessert	'68 Plymouth
16	76	Ben Arnold	'68 Ford
17	10	Bill Champion	'68 Ford
18	80	Wayne Gillette	'67 Chevrolet
19	96	Frank Warren	'68 Ford
20	70	J.D. McDuffie	'67 Buick
21	0	Dick Poling	'67 Chevrolet
22	23	Paul Dean Holt	'67 Ford
23	47	Cecil Gordon	'68 Ford
24	45	Bill Seifert	'68 Ford
25	48	James Hylton	'69 Dodge

== Results ==
POS	ST	#	DRIVER	SPONSOR / OWNER	CAR	LAPS	MONEY	STATUS	LED
1	4	21	Cale Yarborough	60 Minute Cleaners (Wood Brothers)	'69 Mercury	250	17625	running	38
2	7	17	David Pearson	Holman-Moody Racing	'69 Ford	250	10100	running	57
3	5	43	Richard Petty	Torino Talladega / East Tenn. Motors (Petty Enterprises)	'69 Ford	250	5875	running	0
4	2	98	LeeRoy Yarbrough	Mercury Cyclone / Jim Robbins Special (Junior Johnson)	'69 Mercury	249	4100	crash	136
5	6	6	Charlie Glotzbach	Cotton Owens	'69 Dodge	249	3150	running	2
6	8	99	Paul Goldsmith	Town & Country Dodge (Ray Nichels)	'69 Dodge	248	2500	running	4
7	25	48	James Hylton	Hylton Engineering (James Hylton)	'69 Dodge	244	2102	running	2
8	30	06	Neil Castles	Neil Castles	'69 Dodge	242	1572	running	0
9	11	4	John Sears	L.G. DeWitt	'69 Ford	240	1422	running	1
10	31	25	Jabe Thomas	Don Robertson	'68 Plymouth	227	1452	running	0
11	15	15	Ed Hessert	Ed Hessert	'68 Plymouth	224	1352	running	0
12	26	34	Wendell Scott	Scott Racing (Wendell Scott)	'67 Ford	216	1302	running	0
13	20	70	J.D. McDuffie	J.D. McDuffie	'67 Buick	211	1227	running	0
14	13	61	Hoss Ellington	Ellington Insulation Co. (Hoss Ellington)	'67 Mercury	210	1277	running	0
15	29	08	E.J. Trivette	E.C. Reid	'69 Chevrolet	210	1127	running	0
16	23	47	Cecil Gordon	Bill Seifert	'68 Ford	206	1077	running	0
17	32	44	Bob Ashbrook	Giachetti Brothers (Richard Giachetti)	'67 Ford	198	1052	running	0
18	34	19	Henley Gray	Harry Melton	'68 Ford	193	977	engine	0
19	38	30	Dave Marcis	Dave Marcis	'69 Dodge	191	927	engine	0
20	22	23	Paul Dean Holt	Dennis Holt	'67 Ford	187	877	engine	0
21	24	45	Bill Seifert	Bill Seifert	'68 Ford	183	877	engine	0
22	27	26	Earl Brooks	Earl Brooks	'67 Ford	165	802	running	0
23	16	76	Ben Arnold	Don Culpepper	'68 Ford	155	727	lug bolts	0
24	10	32	Dick Brooks	Dick Brooks	'69 Plymouth	150	702	engine	0
25	21	0	Dick Poling	Don Tarr	'67 Chevrolet	143	682	engine	0
26	37	29	John Kennedy	John Kennedy	Chevrolet	143	677	engine	0
27	1	27	Donnie Allison	Banjo Matthews	'69 Ford	115	775	engine	9
28	3	71	Bobby Isaac	K & K Insurance (Nord Krauskopf)	'69 Dodge	94	695	engine	0
29	33	18	Dick Johnson	Dick Johnson	'68 Ford	80	692	clutch	0
30	9	22	Bobby Allison	Hutton Scott Dodge (Mario Rossi)	'69 Dodge	78	635	engine	1
31	36	73	Bobby Wawak	Bobby Wawak	'69 Dodge	74	657	engine	0
32	35	38	Buddy Young	Fred Bear	'67 Ford	62	652	oil line	0
33	28	9	Roy Tyner	Roy Tyner	'69 Pontiac	62	647	wheel bearing	0
34	19	96	Frank Warren	Frank Warren	'68 Ford	55	642	head gasket	0
35	17	10	Bill Champion	Bill Champion	'68 Ford	50	637	engine	0
36	14	64	Elmo Langley	Elmo Langley	'68 Ford	15	657	engine	0
37	12	03	Richard Brickhouse	Dub Clewis	'67 Plymouth	11	677	crash	0
38	18	80	Wayne Gillette	E.C. Reid	'67 Chevrolet	1	622	rear end	0

Preceded by 1969 Maryville 300	NASCAR Grand National Series Season; 1969	Succeeded by 1969 Kingsport 250
