= Back in the Day (2006 TV program) =

- Starring: Dale Earnhardt Jr.
- Country of origin: United States

Production
- Running time: 60 minutes

Original release
- Network: Speed Channel
- Release: February 9, 2006

Back in the Day is a television show on the North American cable/satellite network, Speed Channel. It was hosted by NASCAR superstar driver Dale Earnhardt Jr.

The show, which premiered on February 9, 2006, is a repackaged version of the 1960s and 1970s show Car and Track, which was hosted and narrated by Bud Lindemann. The syndicated 30-minute program carried highlights of major NASCAR races, before such coverage was widely available on network television.

The new version features trivia about stock-car racing and other topics, presented in a "pop-up" style (similar to VH1's Pop-Up Video).

Earnhardt Jr. tapes his segments at his home and at the North Carolina Auto Racing Hall of Fame. Both are located in Mooresville, North Carolina.

The most common featured years are those of the early 1970s.

The show stopped airing before the conversion of Speed Channel to Fox Sports 1.

== Dale Earnhardt Jr.’s Hammerhead Entertainment ==
Back in the Day was created and is produced by Dale Earnhardt Jr.’s Hammerhead Entertainment. The firm is headed by former New York marketing executive Thayer Lavielle. Prior to working with Earnhardt, Lavielle worked as a producer for ABC’s Good Morning America. Hammerhead also produces Dale Jr.’s Unresricted, a loosely formatted radio show on XM.

== Reception ==
The Grand Rapids Press's Steve Kaminski praised the television show, writing, "What Back In The Day does is dust off Lindemann's Car and Track show and juice it up with Earnhardt's commentary and the bubbles. Back In The Day is great news for old-time fans, especially ones in West Michigan." Jane Miller of Peoria Journal Star said the show was "pretty entertaining".
