= 1968 National 500 =

Auto race run in North Carolina in 1968

Race details
- Race 47 of 49 in the 1968 NASCAR Grand National Series season
- Layout of Charlotte Motor Speedway
- Date: October 12, 1968
- Official name: National 500
- Location: Charlotte Motor Speedway, Concord, North Carolina
- Course: Permanent racing facility
- Course length: 1.500 miles (2.414 km)
- Distance: 334 laps, 501 mi (804 km)
- Weather: Mild with temperatures approaching 72 °F (22 °C); wind speeds up to 12 miles per hour (19 km/h)
- Average speed: 135.234 miles per hour (217.638 km/h)
- Attendance: 38,300

Pole position
| Driver | Charlie Glotzbach | Cotton Owens |

Most laps led
| Driver | David Pearson | Holman Moody |
- Laps: 156

Winner
| No. 6 | Charlie Glotzbach | Cotton Owens |

The 1968 National 500 was a NASCAR Grand National Series stock car race that was held on October 20, 1968, at Charlotte Motor Speedway in Concord, North Carolina.

The transition to purpose-built racecars began in the early 1960s and occurred gradually over that decade. Changes made to the sport by the late 1960s brought an end to the "strictly stock" vehicles of the 1950s.

== Summary ==
The race was held on a dry circuit; with no precipitation recorded around the speedway.

There were 45 American-born drivers on the racing grid for this event. Bud Moore scored the last-place finish of the race because he wanted to discontinue the race after only six laps. It took more than three and a half hours to complete the 334 advertised laps.

Dub Simpson, David Mote, Ken Meisenhelder and Walson Gardner failed to qualify while Eddie Yarboro withdrew from the race at the last moment. Notable crew chiefs who actively participated in the race were Junior Johnson, Harry Hyde, Dale Inman, Banjo Matthews, Jake Elder, and Cotton Owens. Charlie Glotzbach defeated legendary driver Paul Goldsmith (a 1956 Southern 500 competitor) by a time of only seven seconds. More than 38000 audience members would see 26 different changes; nine of the best drivers would compete for the first place spot for the race. Six cautions would be waved by NASCAR officials for a total distance of 49 laps.

The other drivers in the top ten included: David Pearson, Bobby Allison, Cale Yarborough, Donnie Allison, Pete Hamilton, Darel Dieringer, Bobby Isaac, and A. J. Foyt.

Roy Trantham, Bill Vanderhoff, and Lennie Waldo would retire from the NASCAR Cup Series after this race.

Buddy Baker, considered at the time to be one of the notable names in stock car racing, blew his engine and span around the paved oval track in flames. Country musician Marty Robbins would improve on his 22nd place start with a 12th-place finish with driving a 1967 Dodge Charger.

The total prize purse of the race was $90,988 ($842,400.86 when adjusted for inflation); the winner received $19,280 of it ($178,501.44 when adjusted for inflation).

Carl Parsons (a mechanic of the team from Detroit, Michigan) drove the car #11 in qualifying but A.J. Foyt drove the car in the race.

| Preceded by 1968 Augusta 200 | NASCAR Grand National Season; 1968 | Succeeded by 1968 American 500 |

| Preceded by 1967 | National 500 races 1968 | Succeeded by 1969 |
