= 1968 Northern 300 =

Auto race run in New Jersey in 1968

Coordinates: 40°14′21″N 74°43′16″W

Race details
- Race 29 of 49 in the 1968 NASCAR Grand National Series season
- Trenton Speedway, featuring its "kidney bean" shape.
- Date: July 14, 1968
- Official name: Northern 300
- Location: Trenton Speedway, Trenton, New Jersey
- Course: Permanent racing facility
- Course length: 1.609 km (1.000 miles)
- Distance: 300 laps, 300 mi (500 km)
- Weather: Very hot with temperatures of 82.9 °F (28.3 °C); wind speeds of 9.9 miles per hour (15.9 km/h)
- Average speed: 89.079 miles per hour (143.359 km/h)
- Attendance: 16,800

Pole position
Driver	LeeRoy Yarbrough	Junior Johnson & Associates

Most laps led
Driver	LeeRoy Yarbrough	Junior Johnson & Associates
- Laps: 285

Winner
No. 98	LeeRoy Yarbrough	Junior Johnson & Associates

Television in the United States
- Network: untelevised
- Announcers: Ned Jarrett (radio commentary)

The 1968 Northern 300 was a NASCAR Grand National Series event that was held on July 14, 1968, at Trenton Speedway in Trenton, New Jersey.

== Background ==
The first race at the Fairgrounds was held on September 24, 1900, but there was no further racing there until 1907. Regular racing began in 1912 and continued until 1941. A new 1 mile dirt oval was opened in 1946. In 1957 the track was paved. It operated in that configuration until 1968 when the track was expanded to 1.5 miles (2.41 km) and a "kidney bean" shape with a 20° right-hand dogleg on the back stretch and a wider turn 3 & 4 complex than turns 1 & 2. The track closed in 1980 and the Fairgrounds itself closed 3 years later. The former site of the speedway is now occupied by the Grounds for Sculpture, a UPS shipping facility, and the housing development known as "Hamilton Lakes".

== Race report ==
Three hundred laps were done on a paved oval track spanning 1.000 mile (1.609 km). The total time of the race was three hours and twenty-two minutes; LeeRoy Yarbrough defeated David Pearson by more than one lap in front of 16800 people. Speeds for the race were: 89.079 miles per hour (143.359 km/h) as the average and 103.717 miles per hour (166.916 km/h) as the pole position speed. Five cautions were waved for twenty-eight laps. Retired Canadian driver Frog Fagan participated in this race. Total winnings for this race were $17,725 USD ($160,271 when considering inflation).

Bobby Allison was driving a 1966 Chevrolet Chevelle to this event. While he flourished early on as an independent race car driver, he quickly floundered after being able to compete against NASCAR racing legends like LeeRoy Yarbrough and David Pearson on a consistent basis.

Gene Black, Blaine Kauffman, and David Mote would end their top-level professional stock car careers at this event. Notable crew chiefs on attendance for this race include Junior Johnson, Harry Hyde, Dale Inman and Jake Elder.

The transition to purpose-built racecars began in the early 1960s and occurred gradually over that decade. Changes made to the sport by the late 1960s brought an end to the "strictly stock" vehicles of the 1950s.

=== Qualifying ===
Grid	No.	Driver	Manufacturer
1	98	LeeRoy Yarbrough	'68 Ford
2	22	Darel Dieringer	'68 Plymouth
3	17	David Pearson	'68 Ford
4	71	Bobby Isaac	'67 Dodge
5	43	Richard Petty	'68 Plymouth
6	3	Buddy Baker	'68 Dodge
7	5	Pete Hamilton	'68 Ford
8	2	Bobby Allison	'66 Chevrolet
9	6	Charlie Glotzbach	'68 Dodge
10	90	Sonny Hutchins	'67 Ford
11	48	James Hylton	'67 Dodge
12	49	G.C. Spencer	'67 Plymouth
13	64	Elmo Langley	'66 Ford
14	44	Blaine Kauffmann	'67 Chevrolet
15	10	Bill Champion	'66 Ford
16	18	Dick Johnson	'67 Ford
17	25	Jabe Thomas	'67 Ford
18	45	Bill Seifert	'68 Ford
19	20	Clyde Lynn	'67 Mercury
20	28	Earl Brooks	'66 Ford
21	06	Neil Castles	'67 Plymouth
22	4	John Sears	'67 Ford
23	87	Buck Baker	'68 Chevrolet
24	0	Don Tarr	'66 Chevrolet
25	8	Ed Negre	'67 Ford

== Finishing order ==
1. LeeRoy Yarbrough† (#98)
2. David Pearson† (#17)
3. Bobby Allison (#2)
4. Charlie Glotzbach (#6)
5. Pete Hamilton† (#5)
6. James Hylton† (#48)
7. John Sears† (#4)
8. G.C. Spencer† (#49)
9. Elmo Langley† (#64)
10. Clyde Lynn† (#20)
11. Jabe Thomas (#25)
12. Wendell Scott† (#34)
13. Dick Johnson (#18)
14. Bill Seifert (#45)
15. Bill Champion*† (#10)
16. Bobby Isaac*† (#71)
17. Blaine Kauffmann* (#44)
18. Darel Dieringer*† (#22)
19. J.D. McDuffie*† (#70)
20. Buddy Baker*† (#3)
21. Buck Baker*† (#87)
22. Richard Petty* (#43)
23. Earl Brooks*† (#28)
24. Paul Dean Holt* (#01)
25. Stan Meserve* (#51)
26. Neil Castles* (#06)
27. Don Tarr* (#0)
28. Roy Hallquist* (#11)
29. Sonny Hutchins*† (#90)
30. Roy Tyner*† (#76)
31. Gene Black*† (#75)
32. Ed Negre*† (#8)
33. Frog Fagan* (#23)
34. David Mote* (#69)
35. Bill Vanderhoff* (#09)
36. George Davis* (#07)

† signifies that the driver is known to be deceased
* Driver failed to finish race

== Timeline ==
Section reference:

- Start of race: LeeRoy Yarbrough began the event with the pole position.
- Lap 2: David Pearson took over the lead from LeeRoy Yarbrough.
- Lap 3: LeeRoy Yarbrough took over the lead from David Pearson.
- Lap 18: Roy Tyner blew his vehicle's engine while racing at high speeds.
- Lap 39: Bobby Isaac took over the lead from LeeRoy Yarbrough.
- Lap 40: Richard Petty took over the lead from Bobby Isaac.
- Lap 41: LeeRoy Yarbrough took over the lead from Richard Petty.
- Lap 74: Don Tarr had a terminal crash, forcing him to retire from the event prematurely.
- Lap 96: Richard Petty took over the lead from LeeRoy Yarbrough.
- Lap 97: LeeRoy Yarbrough took over the lead from Richard Petty.
- Lap 111: Stan Meserve managed to lose the rear end of his vehicle.
- Lap 119: Earl Brooks had a terminal crash, forcing him to retire from the event early.
- Lap 134: Richard Petty took over the lead from LeeRoy Yarbrough.
- Lap 135: Bobby Isaac took over the lead from Richard Petty.
- Lap 136: Richard Petty took over the lead from Bobby Isaac.
- Lap 145: LeeRoy Yarbrough took over the lead from Richard Petty.
- Lap 162: Richard Petty blew his vehicle's engine while racing at high speeds.
- Lap 168: Buck Baker blew his vehicle's engine while racing at high speeds.
- Lap 191: Buddy Baker blew his vehicle's engine while racing at high speeds.
- Lap 231: Darel Dieringer blew his vehicle's engine while racing at high speeds.
- Lap 249: Blaine Kauffmann notice that the oil in his vehicle was leaking badly, forcing him to exit the race with a somewhat respectable 17th-place finish.
- Lap 250: Bobby Isaac blew his vehicle's engine while racing at high speeds.
- Lap 254: Bill Champion blew his vehicle's engine while racing at high speeds.
- Finish: LeeRoy Yarbrough was officially declared the winner of the event.

Preceded by 1968 Fonda 200	NASCAR Grand National Season; 1968	Succeeded by 1968 Volunteer 500
