= Food City 500 =

Auto race held at Bristol, United States

NASCAR Cup Series
- Venue: Bristol Motor Speedway
- Location: Bristol, Tennessee, United States
- Corporate sponsor: Food City
- First race: 1961
- Distance: 266.5 miles (428.9 km)
- Laps: 500; Stages 1/2: 125 each Final stage: 250
- Previous names: Southeastern 500 (1961–1975, 1977–1979); Southeastern 400 (1976); Valleydale Southeastern 500 (1980); Valleydale 500 (1981–1986); Valleydale Meats 500 (1987–1991); Food City 500 (1992–2010, 2012–2014, 2016–2019, 2024–present); Jeff Byrd 500 presented by Food City (2011); Food City 500 In Support Of Steve Byrnes And Stand Up To Cancer (2015); Food City presents the Supermarket Heroes 500 (2020); Food City Dirt Race (2021–2023)
- Most wins (driver): Rusty Wallace (6)
- Most wins (team): Hendrick Motorsports (9, paved surface); Joe Gibbs Racing (2, dirt surface)
- Most wins (manufacturer): Chevrolet (24, paved surface); Toyota (2, dirt surface)

Circuit information
- Surface: Concrete
- Length: 0.533 mi (0.858 km)
- Turns: 4

The Food City 500 is an annual 500-lap, 266.5-mile (428.9 km) NASCAR Cup Series race held at the Bristol Motor Speedway in Bristol, Tennessee. This is one of two NASCAR races held at Bristol, the other being the Bass Pro Shops Night Race. It became the first venue to host the Car of Tomorrow, a race won by Kyle Busch. For much of its history, from 1961 to 1992 the race was run on the original asphalt surface, then on concrete from 1993 to 2020 after Bristol changed surfaces, but was moved to a dirt layout beginning in 2021, under the name Food City Dirt Race. Since 2024, the race returned the concrete oval.

Ty Gibbs is the defending race winner.

== History ==
In 2008, Bristol Motor Speedway President & General Manager Jeff Byrd requested that NASCAR move the spring race to a later Spring date, to avoid the problems with rain, snow, and sleet that hit the area in late winter and early spring. This was not carried out until 2015. In 2015, the race moved from mid-March to April.

In 2011, title sponsor Food City announced it would honor former Speedway President and General Manager Jeff Byrd, who died in October 2010, by renaming the 2011 Spring race the Jeff Byrd 500 presented by Food City.

In 2015, the race was renamed the Food City 500 In Support Of Steve Byrnes And Stand Up To Cancer to support NASCAR on Fox broadcaster Steve Byrnes in his battle with cancer, in association with the Entertainment Industry Foundation.

The 2020 race was dubbed the Food City presents the Supermarket Heroes 500 to honor grocery store workers during the COVID-19 pandemic.

=== Dirt Configuration ===
In 2021, the race shifted to a dirt surface version of the track and was renamed the Food City Dirt Race. The race's stage lengths were initially set at 75 each for the first two segments followed by 100 in the final stage, but stages 1–2 were later adjusted to be 100 laps apiece following Friday practices.

In 2022, the race became a night race, and was run on Easter Sunday. Part of the reason it was moved from daylight to nighttime is because of visibility issues that plagued the event in 2021 with sunlight reflecting off the dirt.

On September 15, 2023, Bristol announced that the Food City 500 would return to the concrete oval, beginning in 2024.

== Notable races ==
- 1968: David Pearson won after a lengthy duel with Richard Petty and LeeRoy Yarbrough in a race prominently featured on the television series Car and Track.
- 1971: Pearson won after tagging James Hylton into the wall; Pearson edged Richard Petty after Petty erased a two-lap deficit.
- 1972: Mechanic (and later car owner) Junior Johnson saw the first of a plethora of Bristol wins over the ensuing two decades as Bobby Allison drove his Chevrolet to an easy win.
- 1973: Driving Junior's Chevy, Cale Yarborough led all 500 laps, a feat he duplicated at Nashville in 1978 and by Jeff Burton at New Hampshire International Speedway in 2000.
- 1974: Chevrolets swept the top ten finishing spots led by Yarborough.
- 1975: Richard Petty posted only his second career Bristol win.
- 1977: Cale led all but five laps in a race where five other drivers (including Janet Guthrie) needed relief help.
- 1979: After Cale crashed out with Buddy Baker, rookie Dale Earnhardt took his first win.
- 1981: Darrell Waltrip drove Johnson's Buick and edged Ricky Rudd, who was driving Waltrip's former car, the DiGard Racing Oldsmobile. Joe Millikan got into a wreck with Benny Parsons and said, "I lost my cool," to which car owner Bud Moore vowed, "I'll straighten out Millikan's cool."
- 1984: Waltrip posted his seventh straight Bristol win and the eighth straight for Junior Johnson.
- 1986: Rusty Wallace posted his first career win.
- 1987: Dale Earnhardt was involved in several crashes en route to the win; Richard Petty finished second.
- 1989: Wallace survived a chaotic race with multiple crashes and a wildcard victory bid by Greg Sacks.
- 1990: A spirited event ended in a wild finish; Sterling Marlin was spun out by Ricky Rudd on the final lap while Davey Allison held off a last-lap charge from Mark Martin to win by inches.
- 1991: Grasping for a solution to pit road crashes emanating from numerous incidents in 1990 (and never considering revoking the pit closure rule that was the ultimate cause), NASCAR had banned tire changes under yellow; for Bristol, this was replaced with the staggering of pit stops based on qualifying line — all "odd" cars (qualified first, third, etc.) would pit first under yellow while "even" cars would pit a lap later; the cars were denoted "odd" and "even" with stickers on their windshields after qualifying; restarts would be double-file based on "odd" and "even" stickered cars. More "even" cars wound up in contention, and this created chaos. Rusty Wallace was able to pass cars under caution to move into his proper restart line, and this helped him come back from two laps down on two occasions. The lead changed 41 times, a short track record, as Wallace edged Ernie Irvan at the finish. Sterling Marlin suffered burns in a fiery melee and needed relief help in subsequent weeks from Charlie Glotzbach.
- 1992: Alan Kulwicki won the race; the last to be held at Bristol before the switch from asphalt to concrete pavement.
- 1993: Wallace dominated days after defending race winner, and defending Winston Cup champion Alan Kulwicki died in a plane crash.
- 1994: An ill-timed yellow trapped Geoff Bodine a lap down and put Dale Earnhardt into the lead en route to the win. Bodine had begun dominating the race in the car formerly owned by Kulwicki and running Hoosier Tires; with the Hoosiers Bodine was able to skip tire changes that Goodyear-shod cars had to make.
- 1995: Jeff Gordon took the win, his third in the season's first six races; the race saw notable performances resulting in top-five finishes for Darrell Waltrip and Bobby Hamilton.
- 1997: Gordon punted Rusty Wallace sideways on the final lap for the win.
- 1999: Wallace ran away at the end, while John Andretti rallied to finish fourth; Andretti's Petty Enterprises Pontiac was impounded after the race as NASCAR had a disagreement with the engine's compression ratio; the engine, though, cleared on reinspection.
- 2000: Rusty Wallace scores his 50th NASCAR Cup Series win.
- 2001: Elliott Sadler edged Andretti for his first win, and the first 1-2 finish for the Wood Brothers and Petty Enterprises since 1977.
- 2002: With NASCAR running high downforce on the cars via big rear spoiler and low airdam clearance, and running very hard tires, Kurt Busch pitted on Lap 325 and never visited the pits again. He bumped Jimmy Spencer for the lead and went on to claim his first Winston Cup win. The move was one of several incidents to occur between Busch and Spencer in what was becoming a heated feud. Rusty Wallace was incensed at the manner with which Busch won the race (by not pitting when others did and thus winning on old tires with no drop in speed) enough that he lobbied NASCAR to cut downforce and go to softer tires in later years to force pitstops.
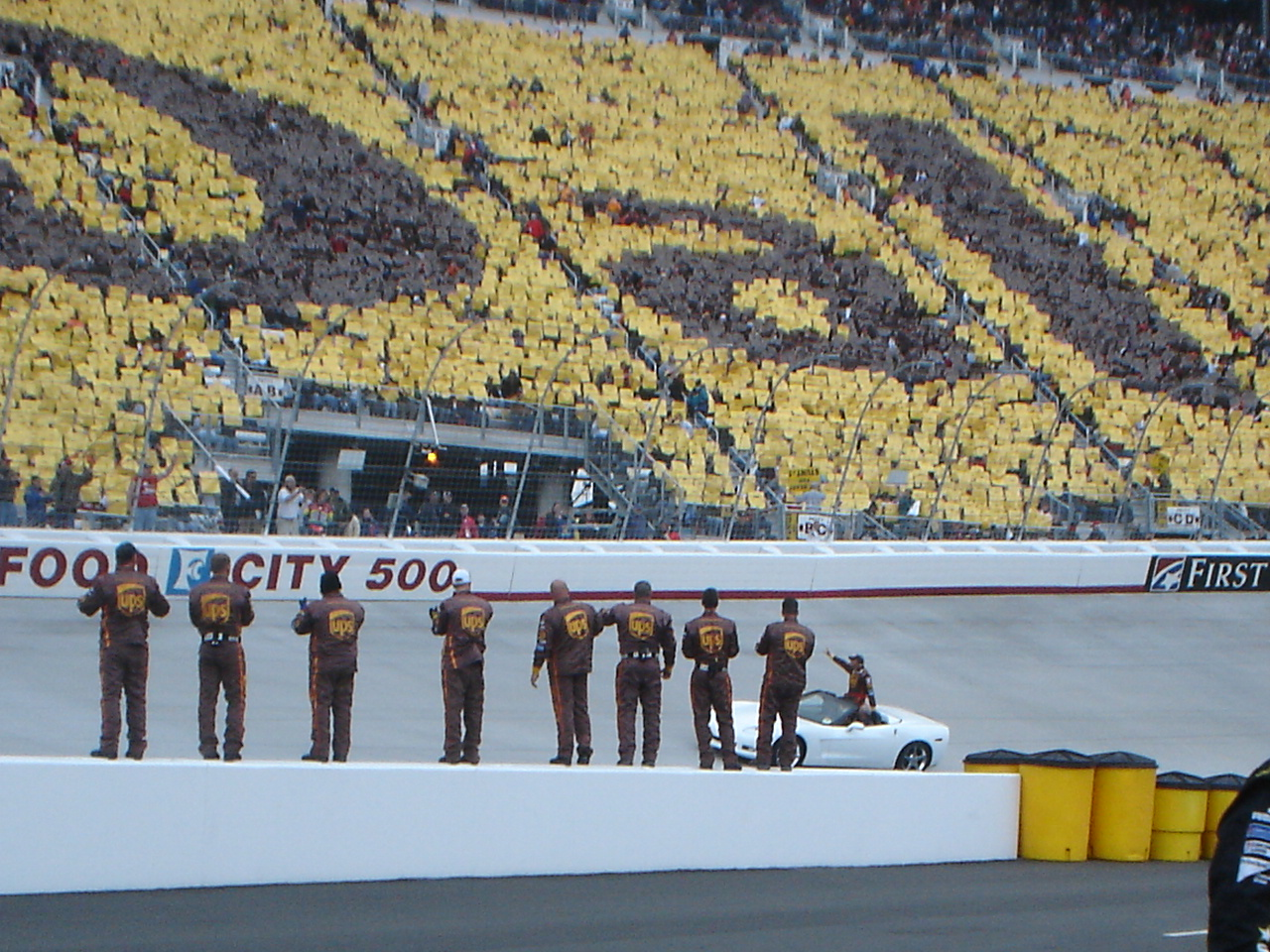
  Dale Jarrett's team and fans honor Jarrett before the 2008 race.
- 2003: In what was the 2,000th race in NASCAR Cup Series history, Kurt Busch came back from a spin to win the race. Also during the race, Kyle Petty got clipped by Ward Burton in the left rear and turned him very abruptly and into the wall driver's side. Petty's crash was then the biggest crash recorded by the black box, recording 80 G's of force on Petty.
- 2004: The final race for Pontiac in the Cup Series as a whole, as Hermie Sadler No. 02 finished 31st.
- 2005: Slight contact between Bobby Hamilton Jr. and Ken Schrader on lap 332 triggered a 14-car wreck. While Kevin Harvick was the winner, 22nd-place Bobby Labonte finished 32 laps down, a rarity for the series over the previous 25 seasons.
- 2007: The fifth-generation NASCAR Cup Series chassis debuted. After Joe Gibbs Racing dominated the race, Kyle Busch drove a Hendrick Chevy to the win, then pointedly ripped the poor raceability of the Gen 5 in victory lane.
- 2008: Dale Jarrett's last race.
- 2010: Jimmie Johnson wins his 50th Sprint Cup Series win, but first at Bristol.
- 2011: After track president Jeff Byrd's death in late 2010, Food City and Bristol Motor Speedway agree to name the race in memory of Byrd in a one-year-only deal.
- 2013: Kyle Busch won the pole with a then-new track qualifying record at 14.813 seconds (129.535 mph). Kasey Kahne won his first Bristol race. The race also marked the start of a feud between Denny Hamlin and Joey Logano, after Hamlin spun Logano during the race.
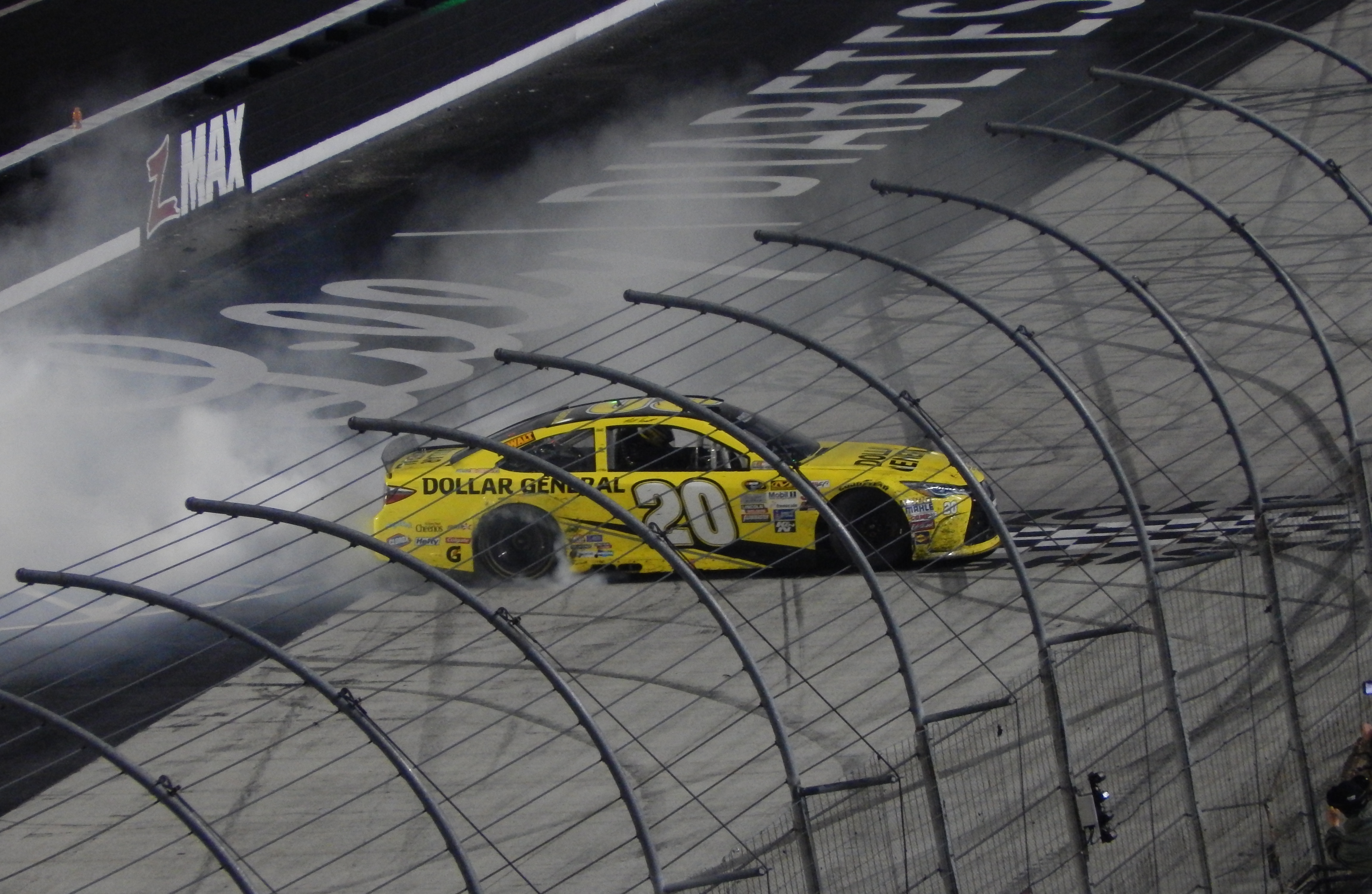
- Matt Kenseth celebrates after winning the 2015 race which was delayed due to weather.
  2014: Denny Hamlin started on pole with a new track record, his first pole of the season. The race was delayed twice, just like the Daytona 500, for rain. Matt Kenseth was involved in a wreck at lap 163 when Timmy Hill rear-ended into him after caution was called for a spin by Cole Whitt. Carl Edwards was leading with a few laps left when a mysterious caution was out. During an attempt for a green–white–checkered finish, the rain started falling and the race was unable to be restarted and would end under caution.
- 2015: The race was scheduled to begin at noon ET and be televised by Fox, but rain delayed the start for 79 minutes. A crash between teammates Brad Keselowski and Joey Logano brought out the caution on lap 19. During the caution, rain began to fall again. The rain was delayed until night and because Fox had another programming, aired on Fox Sports 1. The race resumed at approximately 6:30 p.m. ET, almost 5 hours after the 1st green flag. Although rain threatened to end the race twice, the race was run to completion. Matt Kenseth won, breaking a 51 race winless streak.
- 2018: Rain and four red flags plagued the race on Sunday only getting in 204 laps with the race continuing and concluding on Monday. It tied the record for most red flags in a single NASCAR race with the 2015 Quicken Loans 400, also red-flagged four times. All four red flags in that event were due to weather. Kyle Larson led the most laps for the second straight year (200) but got spun by the lapped car of Ryan Newman at lap 325. Larson was back in the lead with less than 100 laps to go; he was heading for victory until pole-sitter Kyle Busch performed the "Bump n' Run" on Larson with 6 laps to go to steal the win, his 7th at Bristol.
- 2021: The NASCAR Cup Series ran its first race on dirt since 1970 (51 years). After multiple accidents took out several of the pre race favorites, Joey Logano survived an overtime restart to become the first Cup Series driver to win on dirt in the modern era.
- 2022: On the last lap, Tyler Reddick and Chase Briscoe battled for the win with Reddick in position for his first career Cup Series win. In Turn 3, Briscoe sent it in hard to pass Reddick and the two ended up making contact sending both of them spinning around. Reddick got back going but was passed just before the start-finish line by the 3rd place car in Kyle Busch and Busch took home the win with Reddick in 2nd.
- 2024: The race featured a record high 54 lead changes with an early March date and cooler temperatures creating a situation with tire wear issues that was later found to have been caused by cooler ambient and surface temperatures. Denny Hamlin would end up winning the race, but was penalized when Toyota Racing Development disassembled the engine before NASCAR could inspect the engine.

== Past winners ==
Year	Date	No.	Driver	Team	Manufacturer	Race distance		Race time	Average speed (mph)	Report	Ref
Year	Date	No.	Driver	Team	Manufacturer	Laps	Miles (km)	Race time	Average speed (mph)	Report	Ref
Asphalt surface
1961	October 22	8	Joe Weatherly	Bud Moore Engineering	Pontiac	500	250 (402.336)	3:27:02	72.452	Report	
1962	July 29	42	Jim Paschal	Petty Enterprises	Plymouth	500	250 (402.336)	3:19:16	75.276	Report	
1963	March 31	22	Fireball Roberts	Holman-Moody	Ford	500	250 (402.336)	3:15:02	76.91	Report	
1964	March 22	28	Fred Lorenzen	Holman-Moody	Ford	500	250 (402.336)	3:27:46	72.196	Report	
1965	May 2	26	Junior Johnson	Junior Johnson & Associates	Ford	500	250 (402.336)	3:20:10	74.937	Report	
1966	March 20	29	Dick Hutcherson	Holman-Moody	Ford	500	250 (402.336)	3:34:26	69.952	Report	
1967	March 19	6	David Pearson	Cotton Owens	Dodge	500	250 (402.336)	3:17:32	75.937	Report	
1968	March 17	17	David Pearson	Holman-Moody	Ford	500	250 (402.336)	3:14:11	77.247	Report	
1969	March 23	22	Bobby Allison	Mario Rossi	Dodge	500	250 (402.336)	3:04:09	81.455	Report	
1970	April 5	27	Donnie Allison	Banjo Matthews	Ford	500	266.5 (428.89)	3:02:42	87.543	Report	
1971	March 28	17	David Pearson	Holman-Moody	Ford	500	266.5 (428.89)	2:52:23	91.704	Report	
1972	April 9	12	Bobby Allison	Richard Howard	Chevrolet	500	266.5 (428.89)	2:50:18	92.826	Report	
1973	March 11/25*	11	Cale Yarborough	Richard Howard	Chevrolet	500	266.5 (428.89)	2:57:43	88.952	Report	
1974	March 17	11	Cale Yarborough	Richard Howard	Chevrolet	450*	239.85 (386.001)	3:42:50	64.533	Report	
1975	March 16	43	Richard Petty	Petty Enterprises	Dodge	500	266.5 (428.89)	2:43:53	97.053	Report	
1976	March 14	11	Cale Yarborough	Junior Johnson & Associates	Chevrolet	400	213.2 (343.112)	2:25:24	87.377	Report	
1977	April 17	11	Cale Yarborough	Junior Johnson & Associates	Chevrolet	500	266.5 (428.89)	2:38:20	100.989	Report	
1978	April 2	88	Darrell Waltrip	DiGard Motorsports	Chevrolet	500	266.5 (428.89)	2:53:03	92.401	Report	
1979	April 1	2	Dale Earnhardt	Rod Osterlund Racing	Chevrolet	500	266.5 (428.89)	2:55:39	91.033	Report	
1980	March 30	2	Dale Earnhardt	Rod Osterlund Racing	Chevrolet	500	266.5 (428.89)	2:44:53	96.977	Report	
1981	March 29	11	Darrell Waltrip	Junior Johnson & Associates	Buick	500	266.5 (428.89)	2:58:36	89.53	Report	
1982	March 14	11	Darrell Waltrip	Junior Johnson & Associates	Buick	500	266.5 (428.89)	2:49:52	94.025	Report	
1983	May 21	11	Darrell Waltrip	Junior Johnson & Associates	Chevrolet	500	266.5 (428.89)	2:51:07	93.445	Report	
1984	April 1	11	Darrell Waltrip	Junior Johnson & Associates	Chevrolet	500	266.5 (428.89)	2:50:10	93.967	Report	
1985	April 6*	3	Dale Earnhardt	Richard Childress Racing	Chevrolet	500	266.5 (428.89)	3:15:42	81.79	Report	
1986	April 6	27	Rusty Wallace	Blue Max Racing	Pontiac	500	266.5 (428.89)	2:58:14	89.747	Report	
1987	April 12	3	Dale Earnhardt	Richard Childress Racing	Chevrolet	500	266.5 (428.89)	3:31:27	75.621	Report	
1988	April 10	9	Bill Elliott	Melling Racing	Ford	500	266.5 (428.89)	3:12:23	83.115	Report	
1989	April 9	27	Rusty Wallace	Blue Max Racing	Pontiac	500	266.5 (428.89)	3:30:18	76.034	Report	
1990	April 8	28	Davey Allison	Robert Yates Racing	Ford	500	266.5 (428.89)	3:03:15	87.258	Report	
1991	April 14	2	Rusty Wallace	Penske Racing	Pontiac	500	266.5 (428.89)	3:39:37	72.809	Report	
1992	April 5	7	Alan Kulwicki	AK Racing	Ford	500	266.5 (428.89)	3:05:15	86.316	Report	
Concrete surface
1993	April 4	2	Rusty Wallace	Penske Racing	Pontiac	500	266.5 (428.89)	3:08:43	84.73	Report	
1994	April 10	3	Dale Earnhardt	Richard Childress Racing	Chevrolet	500	266.5 (428.89)	2:58:22	89.647	Report	
1995	April 2	24	Jeff Gordon	Hendrick Motorsports	Chevrolet	500	266.5 (428.89)	2:53:47	92.011	Report	
1996	March 31	24	Jeff Gordon	Hendrick Motorsports	Chevrolet	342*	182.286 (293.36)	1:59:47	91.308	Report	
1997	April 13	24	Jeff Gordon	Hendrick Motorsports	Chevrolet	500	266.5 (428.89)	3:33:06	75.035	Report	
1998	March 29	24	Jeff Gordon	Hendrick Motorsports	Chevrolet	500	266.5 (428.89)	3:13:00	82.85	Report	
1999	April 11	2	Rusty Wallace	Penske Racing	Ford	500	266.5 (428.89)	2:51:16	93.363	Report	
2000	March 26	2	Rusty Wallace	Penske Racing	Ford	500	266.5 (428.89)	3:01:40	88.018	Report	
2001	March 25	21	Elliott Sadler	Wood Brothers Racing	Ford	500	266.5 (428.89)	3:03:54	86.949	Report	
2002	March 24	97	Kurt Busch	Roush Racing	Ford	500	266.5 (428.89)	3:14:20	82.281	Report	
2003	March 23	97	Kurt Busch	Roush Racing	Ford	500	266.5 (428.89)	3:29:53	76.185	Report	
2004	March 28	97	Kurt Busch	Roush Racing	Ford	500	266.5 (428.89)	3:13:34	82.607	Report	
2005	April 3	29	Kevin Harvick	Richard Childress Racing	Chevrolet	500	266.5 (428.89)	3:26:20	77.496	Report	
2006	March 26	2	Kurt Busch	Penske Racing	Dodge	500	266.5 (428.89)	3:21:19	79.427	Report	
2007	March 25	5	Kyle Busch	Hendrick Motorsports	Chevrolet	504*	268.632 (432.321)	3:16:38	81.969	Report	
2008	March 16	31	Jeff Burton	Richard Childress Racing	Chevrolet	506*	269.698 (434.036)	3:00:15	89.775	Report	
2009	March 22	18	Kyle Busch	Joe Gibbs Racing	Toyota	503*	268.099 (431.463)	2:54:35	92.139	Report	
2010	March 21	48	Jimmie Johnson	Hendrick Motorsports	Chevrolet	500	266.5 (428.89)	3:20:50	79.618	Report	
2011	March 20	18	Kyle Busch	Joe Gibbs Racing	Toyota	500	266.5 (428.89)	2:53:55	91.941	Report	
2012	March 18	2	Brad Keselowski	Penske Racing	Dodge	500	266.5 (428.89)	2:51:52	93.037	Report	
2013	March 17	5	Kasey Kahne	Hendrick Motorsports	Chevrolet	500	266.5 (428.89)	2:53:25	92.206	Report	
2014	March 16	99	Carl Edwards	Roush Fenway Racing	Ford	503*	268.099 (431.463)	3:11:23	84.051	Report	
2015	April 19	20	Matt Kenseth	Joe Gibbs Racing	Toyota	511*	272.363 (438.325)	3:37:54	74.997	Report	
2016	April 17	19	Carl Edwards	Joe Gibbs Racing	Toyota	500	266.5 (428.89)	3:15:52	81.637	Report	
2017	April 24*	48	Jimmie Johnson	Hendrick Motorsports	Chevrolet	500	266.5 (428.89)	3:04:29	86.674	Report	
2018	April 15/16*	18	Kyle Busch	Joe Gibbs Racing	Toyota	500	266.5 (428.89)	3:26:25	77.465	Report	
2019	April 7	18	Kyle Busch	Joe Gibbs Racing	Toyota	500	266.5 (428.89)	2:56:38	90.527	Report	
2020	May 31*	2	Brad Keselowski	Team Penske	Ford	500	266.5 (428.89)	3:19:02	80.338	Report	
Dirt surface
2021	March 29*	22	Joey Logano	Team Penske	Ford	253*	134.849 (217.018)	2:43:53	46.313	Report	
2022	April 17	18	Kyle Busch	Joe Gibbs Racing	Toyota	250	133.25 (214.445)	3:34:27	34.973	Report	
2023	April 9	20	Christopher Bell	Joe Gibbs Racing	Toyota	250	133.25 (214.445)	2:40:40	46.68	Report	
Concrete surface
2024	March 17	11	Denny Hamlin	Joe Gibbs Racing	Toyota	500	266.5 (428.89)	3:20:41	79.678	Report	
2025	April 13	5	Kyle Larson	Hendrick Motorsports	Chevrolet	500	265.5 (428.89)	2:38:43	100.746	Report	
2026	April 12	54	Ty Gibbs	Joe Gibbs Racing	Toyota	505*	269.165 (434.81)	3:01:50	88.817	Report	
2027	April 11									Report	

- 1973: Race started on March 11 but suspended until March 25 after 52 laps due to rain.
- 1974: Race shortened due to energy crisis.
- 1985: Race postponed from March 31 due to rain.
- 1996: Race shortened due to rain.
- 2007–09, 2015, 2021 and 2026: Races extended due to NASCAR overtime.
- 2014: Race extended due to NASCAR overtime, but overtime restart was aborted and race called due to rain.
- 2017: Race postponed from Sunday to Monday due to rain.
- 2018: Race suspended until Monday due to rain.
- 2020: Race postponed from April 5 to May 31 due to the COVID-19 pandemic.
- 2021: Race postponed from Sunday to Monday due to heavy rain and flash flooding.

=== Track length notes ===
- 1961–1969: 0.5 mile course
- Since 1970: 0.533 mile course

=== Multiple winners (drivers) ===
Asphalt/Concrete surface
# Wins	Driver	Years won
6	Rusty Wallace	1986, 1989, 1991, 1993, 1999–2000
5	Darrell Waltrip	1978, 1981–1984
5	Dale Earnhardt	1979–1980, 1985, 1987, 1994
5	Kyle Busch	2007, 2009, 2011, 2018–2019
4	Cale Yarborough	1973–1974, 1976–1977
4	Jeff Gordon	1995–1998
4	Kurt Busch	2002–2004, 2006
3	David Pearson	1967–1968, 1971
2	Bobby Allison	1969, 1972
2	Carl Edwards	2014, 2016
2	Jimmie Johnson	2010, 2017
2	Brad Keselowski	2012, 2020

Dirt surface
# Wins	Driver	Years won
1	Joey Logano	2021
1	Kyle Busch	2022
1	Christopher Bell	2023

=== Multiple winners (teams) ===
Asphalt/Concrete surface
# Wins	Team	Years won
9	Hendrick Motorsports	1995–1998, 2007, 2010, 2013, 2017, 2025
8	Joe Gibbs Racing	2009, 2011, 2015–2016, 2018–2019, 2024, 2026
7	Junior Johnson & Associates	1965, 1976–1977, 1981–1984
7	Team Penske	1991, 1993, 1999–2000, 2006, 2012, 2020
5	Holman-Moody	1963–1964, 1966, 1968, 1971
5	Richard Childress Racing	1985, 1987, 1994, 2005, 2008
4	Roush Fenway Racing	2002–2004, 2014
3	Richard Howard	1972–1974
2	Petty Enterprises	1962, 1975
2	Rod Osterlund Racing	1979–1980
2	Blue Max Racing	1986, 1989

Dirt surface
# Wins	Team	Years won
2	Joe Gibbs Racing	2022–2023
1	Team Penske	2021

=== Manufacturer wins ===
Asphalt/Concrete surface
# Wins	Manufacturer	Years won
24	Chevrolet	1972–1974, 1976–1980, 1983–1985, 1987, 1994–1998, 2005, 2007–2008, 2010, 2013, 2017, 2025
18	Ford	1963–1966, 1968, 1970–1971, 1988, 1990, 1992, 1999, 2000–2004, 2014, 2020
8	Toyota	2009, 2011, 2015–2016, 2018–2019, 2024, 2026
5	Pontiac	1961, 1986, 1989, 1991, 1993
5	Dodge	1967, 1969, 1975, 2006, 2012
2	Buick	1981–1982
1	Plymouth	1962

Dirt surface
# Wins	Manufacturer	Years won
2	Toyota	2022–2023
1	Ford	2021

Previous race: Goodyear 400	NASCAR Cup Series; Food City 500	Next race: Cook Out 400
