= 1968 Southeastern 500 =

Auto race held at Bristol Motor Speedway in 1968

Race details
- Race 5 of 49 in the 1968 NASCAR Grand National Series season
- Layout of Bristol Motor Speedway
- Date: March 17, 1968
- Official name: Southeastern 500
- Location: Bristol International Speedway, Bristol, Tennessee
- Course: Permanent racing facility
- Course length: 0.800 km (0.500 miles)
- Distance: 500 laps, 250.0 mi (400.0 km)
- Weather: Cold with temperatures of 57 °F (14 °C); wind speeds of 14 miles per hour (23 km/h)
- Average speed: 77.247 mph (124.317 km/h)
- Attendance: 19,800

Pole position
Driver	Richard Petty	Petty Enterprises

Most laps led
Driver	David Pearson	Holman-Moody
- Laps: 176

Winner
No. 17	David Pearson	Holman-Moody

Television in the United States
- Network: CBS
- Announcers: Bud Lindemann

The 1968 Southeastern 500 was a NASCAR Grand National Series event that was held on March 17, 1968, at Bristol International Speedway in Bristol, Tennessee. Highlights of this racing event were later shown on the classic Car and Track television show on most CBS stations.

The transition to purpose-built racecars began in the early 1960s and occurred gradually over that decade. Changes made to the sport by the late 1960s brought an end to the "strictly stock" vehicles of the 1950s.

== Race report ==
A total distance of 500 laps was accomplished at this event; with Bobby Allison acquiring the last-place position due to stock car engine problems on lap 41. Stan Meserve would fall out with engine failure on lap 54. Driveshaft problems would end Paul Goldsmith's day on lap 60 while terminal vehicle damage would end Jerry Grant's day on lap 72. An accident would claim the vehicle of G.C. Spencer on lap 91 while an oil leak would take Roy Tyner out the race on lap 104.

Clyde Lynn's incredibly disappearing tail end of his vehicle eventually stalled his racing hopes on lap 445. While the first 100 laps of this race event were a David Pearson and Richard Petty show, it would be LeeRoy Yarbrough would compete against Pearson in the closing laps of this event. All 36 of the qualifying drivers were born in the United States of America. Henley Gray would become the lowest-finishing driver to actually complete the event; albeit more than 100 laps behind the lead-lap competitors.

David Pearson would best Richard Petty by a distance of three seconds after racing at each other's throats for more than three hours; Petty drove the last 25 laps of the race without any brakes. More than 19,000 ardent NASCAR followers would see a race marred by eleven caution flags for a duration of 81 laps. Richard Petty's qualifying speed of 88.582 miles per hour (142.559 km/h) would see him blaze through the field during solo qualifying runs. Cale Yarborough would spend some time as the leader of the race before an incident involving the back of his vehicle would end his day of racing on lap 237. Roy Trantham would make his introduction into the NASCAR Cup Series scene in this race while Serge Adams would exit stage left from NASCAR racing after the conclusion of this event. Doug Cooper also enjoyed his final NASCAR Grand National Series race at this event before retiring.

Individual race earnings ranged from the winner's share of $25,415 ($229,805 when adjusted for inflation) to the last-place finisher's portion of $500 ($4,521 when adjusted for inflation). NASCAR handed out a grand total of $86,285 to all the competitors who qualified for this racing event ($780,198 when adjusted for inflation).

At least ten notable crew chiefs were recorded as officially attending this race; including Ray Hicks, Jake Elder, Glen Wood, Junior Johnson and Banjo Matthews.

=== Qualifying ===
Grid	No.	Driver	Manufacturer
1	43	Richard Petty	'68 Plymouth
2	17	David Pearson	'68 Ford
3	21	Cale Yarborough	'68 Ford
4	26	LeeRoy Yarbrough	'68 Ford
5	22	Darel Dieringer	'68 Plymouth
6	27	Donnie Allison	'68 Ford
7	14	Jerry Grant	'68 Plymouth
8	29	Bobby Allison	'68 Ford
9	16	Tiny Lund	'68 Mercury
10	3	Buddy Baker	'67 Dodge
11	71	Bobby Isaac	'67 Dodge
12	4	John Sears	'67 Ford
13	99	Paul Goldsmith	'68 Plymouth
14	49	G.C. Spencer	'67 Plymouth
15	09	Jack Ingram	'66 Chevrolet
16	10	Bill Champion	'66 Ford
17	64	Elmo Langley	'66 Ford
18	39	Friday Hassler	'66 Chevrolet
19	45	Bill Seifert	'66 Ford
20	30	Dave Marcis	'66 Chevrolet
21	25	Jabe Thomas	'67 Ford
22	50	Wendell Scott	'66 Plymouth
23	20	Clyde Lynn	'67 Mercury
24	19	Henley Gray	'66 Ford
25	76	Roy Tyner	'66 Ford
26	31	Bill Ervin	'66 Ford
27	02	Bob Cooper	'66 Chevrolet
28	48	James Hylton	'67 Dodge
29	1	Bud Moore	'68 Dodge
30	51	Stan Meserve	'67 Dodge
31	95	Doug Cooper	'66 Ford
32	2	Earl Brooks	'66 Ford
33	18	Dick Johnson	'67 Ford
34	01	Paul Dean Holt	'67 Ford
35	93	Walson Gardner	'67 Ford
36	06	Neil Castles	'67 Plymouth

== Top 20 finishers ==
Pos	No.	Driver	Manufacturer	Laps	Laps led	Time/Status
1	17	David Pearson	Ford	500	176	3:14:11
2	43	Richard Petty	Plymouth	500	108	+3 seconds
3	26	LeeRoy Yarbrough	Ford	499	168	+1 lap (Note: With possible late-race mechanical issues)
4	22	Darel Dieringer	Plymouth	492	0	+8 laps
5	71	Bobby Isaac	Dodge	491	0	+9 laps
6	1	Bud Moore	Dodge	491	0	+9 laps
7	09	Jack Ingram	Chevrolet	481	0	+19 laps
8	10	Bill Champion	Ford	469	0	+31 laps
9	64	Elmo Langley	Ford	468	0	+32 laps
10	2	Earl Brooks	Ford	467	0	+33 laps
11	06	Neil Castles	Plymouth	467	0	+33 laps
12	45	Bill Seifert	Ford	454	0	+46 laps
13	30	Dave Marcis	Chevrolet	449	0	+51 laps
14	20	Clyde Lynn	Mercury	445	0	Missing rear end
15	50	Wendell Scott	Plymouth	436	0	+64 laps
16	02	Bob Cooper	Chevrolet	430	0	+70 laps
17	25	Jabe Thomas	Ford	427	0	+73 laps
18	01	Paul Dean Holt	Ford	412	0	+78 laps
19	31	Bill Ervin	Ford	396	0	+104 laps
20	19	Henley Gray	Ford	392	0	+108 laps

== Notes ==
Preceded by 1968 Daytona 500	NASCAR Grand National Season; 1968	Succeeded by 1968 Richmond 250
