= Car and Track =

American television show

Car and Track was America's first nationally syndicated auto racing and car test television show. Produced by Car and Track Productions, it was hosted and produced by Bud Lindemann, a famous race commentator of the time. After the TV series ended, Bud and his son David Lindemmann continued to film many types of racing. They compiled one of the most important film libraries of the early days of NASCAR. Car and Track was based in Grand Rapids, Michigan. This allowed them to have close relationships with Detroit automotive manufacturers and suppliers.

It is believed to have run from 1968 to 1975, with 80 or more episodes originally airing on CBS. In later years, the cable television station Speedvision (which in 2002 became the Speed Channel), aired re-runs from approximately 1996 to 2002. In 2005, network executives revamped the old program, turning it into a primetime NASCAR history highlight show retitled Back in the Day, and hosted by NASCAR driver Dale Earnhardt Jr. It now had a modern, more mass appeal look, though only highlighting select NASCAR racing footage the show carried. The ending of the show does pay homage to the original ending, showing the original host Bud Lindemann's goodbye quote. The quotes varied among episodes but usually stated, "...and drive safely, won't you? All the pros do."

Aside from the show's large attention to NASCAR racing, it also included various other American racing including NHRA drag racing, USAC stock car and Champ Car racing (Champ Car at that time implied USAC) and sprint car racing on paved and dirt ovals. Also featured were IHRA Funny Car and Top Fuel drag racing events. One or more new-car road tests per episode were also featured. The racing library was not limited to automobiles, they even filmed snowmobile racing.

The series used stock music cues, most of them also used by NFL Films, for its varied features, such as in coverage of the 1974 Daytona 500, which used the Jack Trombey track "Military Attache," a cue that opened NFL Films' 1974 Pittsburgh Steelers season review film. The show's 1968 opening theme (using footage from Rockingham and Daytona shot in 1965 and footage of one of Andy Granatelli's turbine Indycars at Milwaukee in 1968) was a variation of Trombey's track "Rhythmical Interruption No. 2." A track used frequently was the Peter Reno track "Recoil." In the later years, the original music came from numerous southern sources with everything from country to styles that are reminiscent of Jimmy Buffett.

== Notable races the series covered ==
- 1968 Rex Mays 150 at Milwaukee (Indycars)
- 1968 Southeastern 500 (NASCAR)
- 1968 Carolina and American 500s at Rockingham (NASCAR)
- 1968 Michigan 200 (Indycars) with test session interview with A. J. Foyt
- 1968 250-mile Indycar race at Hanford Speedway
- 1969 Motor State 500 (NASCAR)
- 1969 American 500 plus recap of 1969 season
- 1970 California 500
- 1971 Winston Western 500 (NASCAR)
- 1971 Miller 500 and Permatex 250 at Ontario Motor Speedway in separate episodes (NASCAR)
- 1971 World 600 (NASCAR)
- 1971 Michigan 400
- 1972 USAC stock cars at Wisconsin International Raceway
- 1972 Miller 500
- 1972 Southeastern 500 (NASCAR)
- 1972 Winston 500
- 1972 World 600
- 1972 Michigan 400
- 1972 Michigan 200 (Indycars)
- 1973 Daytona 500
- 1973 Daytona qualifying races in separate episodes (NASCAR)
- 1973 Sportsman 300 (NASCAR)
- 1973 Southeastern 500 (NASCAR)
- 1973 Rebel 500
- 1973 Winston 500 (NASCAR)
- 1973 World 600
- 1973 NAMAR midgets at Winchester Speedway
- 1974 USAC sprint cars at Winchester Speedway
- 1974 Winston Western 500 (NASCAR)
- 1974 Daytona 500
- 1974 Sportsman 300 (NASCAR)
- 1974 Carolina 500 plus Pit Crew competition (NASCAR)
- 1974 Phoenix 150 (Indycars)
- 1974 Rebel 500
- 1974 Southeastern 500
- 1974 Cardinal 500 doubleheader at Martinsville Speedway (NASCAR)
- 1974 Winston 500
- 1974 World 600
- 1975 Daytona 500
- 1975 Sportsman 300
- 1975 Carolina 500
- 1975 Atlanta 500
- 1975 Rebel 500
- 1975 Cardinal 500 doubleheader at Martinsville Speedway
- 1975 Virginia 500 (NASCAR)
- 1975 Winston 500
- 1975 Vulcan 200 at Talladega (ARCA stock cars) and California 500 at Ontario (Indycars)

Footage was also shot from the 1974 Yankee 400 that was used in the show's main title sequence indicating sponsorship of the series by Blue Max automotive products.

== Other ==
From time-to-time, other features, such as safety reports and driver safety education segments, would be included. In one 1971 episode actor James Garner was accompanied for high-speed safety training at the Skip Barber Racing School behind the wheel of an Oldsmobile Cutlass. Footage of other events, such as stunt and arena shows or conceptual auto displays, was often used to close the show.

== Automotive reports and testing ==
New car testing in the show did not focus exclusively on one particular type of vehicle. Although "muscle cars" seemed to make up the bulk of the reviews, and Bud Lindemann seemed to express extra enthusiasm for them, economy cars, Jeeps, and even motorhomes were also occasionally tested. Vehicles were shown in their original forms. As in today's car testing methods, the vehicles were usually the highest level furnished of the model, or in some instances prototypes. Many of the tests were filmed on the Waterford Hills Road Race Course in Clarkston, Michigan (just north of Detroit). Most tests filmed at Grattan raceway near Grand Rapids.

Prototypes included:

- 1968 Dodge Charger 500 concept
- 1969 Ford Mustang Mach 1 concept
- 1969 AMC AMX 390 'prototype'

Production vehicles tested included:

- 1968 Hurst Oldsmobile 455 (1 of 515). The segment includes interview with the car’s designer Jack Watson.
- 1968 Jaguar XK-E 4.2
- 1968 Shelby Mustang GT 500 428 4-barrel
- 1969 Avanti II 327 Supercharged
- 1969 Chevrolet Impala 396 2-barrel
- 1969 Dodge Charger 500 426 Hemi
- 1969 Dodge Dart Swinger 340
- 1969 Ford LTD 429 4-barrel
- 1969 Ford Mustang 428 Cobra Jet
- 1969 Ford Mustang Mach 1 428 Cobra Jet
- 1969 Ford Torino 428 Cobra Jet
- 1971 Mercury Marquis
- 1971 AMC Gremlin
- 1971 AMC Javelin 401
- 1971 Buick Riviera 455
- 1971 Chevrolet Camaro 350 2-barrel
- 1971 Chrysler New Yorker
- 1971 Dodge Challenger 383
- 1971 Dodge Charger SE 440 4-barrel
- 1971 Ford Torino GT 429 4-barrel
- 1971 Oldsmobile 442 W30 convertible 4-speed (1 of 33)
- 1971 Mercury Capri 1.6
- 1971 Mercury Cyclone 351
- 1972 Buick Centurion 455 4-barrel
- 1972 Buick Riviera GS 455
- 1973 Buick Century 455 Gran Sport (Stage One)
- 1973 Plymouth Cuda 340
- 1973 Oldsmobile Cutlass 455 4-barrel
- 1973 Opel Manta Luxus 1.9
- 1974 AMC Matador 401 4-barrel
- 1974 Buick LeSabre 455 2-barrel
- 1974 Chevrolet Camaro LT 350 2-barrel
- 1974 Chevrolet Vega
- 1974 Ford Pinto
- 1974 Oldsmobile Cutlass 350 4-barrel
- 1974 Oldsmobile Omega S 350 4-barrel
- 1974 Mercury Cougar XR7
- 1974 Volkswagen Dasher
- 1974 Volkswagen Super Beetle
- 1974 Volkswagen Super Beetle with Camper Trailer
