= 1967 Capital City 300 =

American NASCAR auto race in 1967

Race details
- Race 42 of 49 in the 1967 NASCAR Grand National Series season
- Layout of Richmond Speedway
- Date: September 10, 1967
- Official name: Capital City 300
- Location: Virginia State Fairgrounds, Richmond, Virginia
- Course: Permanent racing facility
- Course length: 0.500 miles (0.800 km)
- Distance: 300 laps, 150 mi (180 km)
- Weather: Mild with temperatures up to 75 °F (24 °C); wind speeds up to 12 miles per hour (19 km/h)
- Average speed: 57.631 mph (92.748 km/h)
- Attendance: 11,000

Pole position
Driver	Earl Brooks	Don Culpepper

Most laps led
Driver	Richard Petty	Petty Enterprises
- Laps: 177

Winner
No. 43	Richard Petty	Petty Enterprises

Television in the United States
- Network: Untelevised
- Announcers: None

The 1967 Capital City 300 was a NASCAR Grand National Series event that was held on September 10, 1967, at Virginia State Fairgrounds (now Richmond Raceway) in Richmond, Virginia. Until the 2020 The Real Heroes 400, this was the last race to have a random draw for the pole position.

The time of the race was two hours, thirty-six minutes, and ten seconds with the average speed being 57.631 miles per hour (92.748 km/h). The pole position spot was chosen by a random drawing; the rain that swept through the area had made the track far too muddy for qualifying sessions. Brooks drew the pole and the race was then started under green-yellow. The cars paced for 24 laps to help pack the clay; Richard Petty took over the lead on lap 25 to help bring about true racing.

Those 24 laps were the only laps that Earl Brooks would lead in his NASCAR Grand National career.

== Background ==
In 1953, Richmond International Raceway began hosting the Grand National Series with Lee Petty winning that first race in Richmond. The original track was paved in 1968. In 1988, the track was re-designed into its present D-shaped configuration

The name for the raceway complex was "Strawberry Hill" until the Virginia State Fairgrounds site was bought out in 1999 and renamed the "Richmond International Raceway".

== Race report ==
Richard Petty would defeat Dick Hutcherson after all the laps in the race were completed; which became the 71st win in his 200-win career as a Cup Series race. The other top ten finishers were: Paul Goldsmith, Sam McQuagg, James Hylton, Wendell Scott, Worth McMillion, E.J. Trivette, Henley Gray, and George Davis. There were twenty-eight American competitors and two Canadian competitors (Frog Fagan and Don Biederman). Econo Wash and Nichels Engineering were the main sponsors for the drivers.

Bobby Allison broke a tie rod coming out of turn 4 on the 131st lap. Similar to his wreck at Talladega 20 years later, Allison flipped down the front stretch, cleared a guard rail, smashed through a fence and came to rest near the scorers' table - a table at which his wife Judy was sitting. Fortunately, Bobby, Judy and others were OK.

Most of the team owners in this race were individuals rather than multi-car teams; as the case usually was with NASCAR races prior to the mid-1970s.

Richard Petty would receive ($23,656 when considering inflation) $2,450 for winning the race while Don Biederman would be the lowest finishing driver (27th) to receive a prize bonus for $150 ($1,448 when considering inflation). The drivers who finished 29th and 30th (last place) would not receive any prize money. Total winnings for this race would be $11,610 ($1,077,671 when considering inflation).

Frog Fagan would make his official NASCAR Cup Series debut in this race. Eleven thousand fans would see a race with eleven cautions for seventy-one laps and three hundred laps were completed on a track spanning 0.500 miles (0.805 km). J.P. Barthelette would serve as one of the crew chiefs in the race alongside Frankie Scott, Dale Inman and Bud Hartje. Their drivers were Dick Hutcherson, Wendell Scott, Richard Petty and James Hylton.

The transition to purpose-built racecars began in the early 1960s and occurred gradually over that decade. Changes made to the sport by the late 1960s brought an end to the "strictly stock" vehicles of the 1950s.

=== Qualifying ===
Grid	No.	Driver	Manufacturer	Owner
1	76	Earl Brooks	'66 Ford	Don Culpepper
2	43	Richard Petty	'67 Plymouth	Petty Enterprises
3	91	Neil Castles	'65 Plymouth	Neil Castles
4	25	Jabe Thomas	'67 Ford	Don Robertson
5	64	Elmo Langley	'66 Ford	Elmo Langley / Henry Woodfield
6	2	Bobby Allison	'65 Chevrolet	Donald Brackins
7	54	Tom Raley	'66 Ford	Tom Raley
8	4	John Sears	'66 Ford	L.G. DeWitt
9	45	Bill Seifert	'66 Ford	Bill Seifert
10	6	Sam McQuagg	'67 Dodge	Cotton Owens
11	20	Clyde Lynn	'66 Ford	Clyde Lynn
12	99	Paul Goldsmith	'67 Plymouth	Ray Nichels
13	11	J.T. Putney	'66 Chevrolet	J.T. Putney
14	63	Melvin Bradley	'66 Ford	Bob Adams
15	5	Ray Hendrick	'66 Dodge	Cotton Owens
16	02	Doug Cooper	'66 Chevrolet	Bob Cooper
17	07	George Davis	'66 Chevrolet	George Davis
18	34	Wendell Scott	'66 Ford	Wendell Scott
19	29	Dick Hutcherson	'67 Ford	Bondy Long
20	48	James Hylton	'65 Dodge	Bud Hartje
21	57	George Poulos	'65 Plymouth	George Poulos
22	01	Paul Dean Holt	'67 Ford	Dennis Holt
23	31	Bill Ervin	'66 Ford	Ralph Murphy
24	97	Henley Gray	'66 Ford	Henley Gray
25	19	E.J. Trivette	'66 Chevrolet	Roy Dutton
25	75	Frog Fagan	'66 Ford	Bob Gilreath
26	38	Wayne Smith	'66 Chevrolet	Archie Smith
28	94	Don Biederman	'66 Chevrolet	Ron Stotten
29	83	Worth McMillion	'66 Pontiac	Allen McMillion
30	12	Johnny Steele	'67 Ford	Johnny Steele

== Finishing order ==
Section reference:

1. Richard Petty (No. 43)
2. Dick Hutcherson (No. 29)
3. Paul Goldsmith (No. 99)
4. Sam McQuagg* (No. 6)
5. James Hylton (No. 48)
6. Wendell Scott (No. 34)
7. Worth McMillion (No. 83)
8. E.J. Trivette (No. 19)
9. Henley Gray (No. 97)
10. George Davis (No. 07)
11. George Poulous (No. 57)
12. Elmo Langley* (No. 67)
13. Bill Seifert* (No. 45)
14. Wayne Smith* (No. 38)
15. Johnny Steele* (No. 12)
16. Earl Brooks (No. 76)
17. Melvin Bradley* (No. 63)
18. J.T. Putney* (No. 11)
19. Bobby Allison* (No. 2)
20. John Sears* (No. 4)
21. Ray Hendrick* (No. 5)
22. Bill Ervin* (No. 31)
23. Jabe Thomas* (No. 25)
24. Paul Dean Holt* (No. 01)
25. Doug Cooper* (No. 02)
26. Frog Fagan* (No. 75)
27. Don Biederman* (No. 94)
28. Neil Castles* (No. 91)
29. Tom Raley* (No. 54)
30. Clyde Lynn* (No. 20)

* Driver failed to finish race

== Timeline ==
Section reference:

- Start of race: Earl Brooks lead the other cars as they started the event.
- Lap 25: Richard Petty took over the lead from Earl Brooks.
- Lap 26: Paul Goldsmith took over the lead from Richard Petty.
- Lap 30: Neil Castles had a terminal crash.
- Lap 79: Sway bar issues managed to knock Don Biederman out of contention.
- Lap 90: Dick Hutcherson took over the lead from Paul Goldsmith.
- Lap 91: Bobby Allison took over the lead from Dick Hutcherson.
- Lap 97: Richard Petty took over the lead from Bobby Allison.
- Lap 100: Paul Dean Holt would have transmission issues with his vehicle.
- Lap 102: The frame on Jabe Thomas' vehicle would come off, causing him to leave the race for safety reasons.
- Lap 107: Ray Hendrick's engine problem would relegate him to the sidelines.
- Lap 116: Sam McQuagg took over the lead from Richard Petty.
- Lap 124: Dick Hutcherson took over the lead from Sam McQuagg.
- Lap 125: John Sears' engine developed problems, forcing him to exit the race prematurely.
- Lap 128: Bobby Allison had a terminal crash.
- Lap 138: Richard Petty took over the lead from Sam McQuagg.
- Lap 165: J.T. Putney developed problems with his vehicle's transmission.
- Lap 169: A frame came loose off Melvin Bradley's vehicle.
- Lap 197: Johnny Steele managed to blow his engine, bringing a premature end to his race.
- Lap 202: Bill Seifert managed to lose the frame of his vehicle; Wayne Smith's vehicle would suffer from a faulty transmission.
- Lap 203: An axle came loose off Elmo Langley's vehicle.
- Lap 289: Sam McQuagg lost the rear end of the vehicle, he was called off the track due to safety reasons.
- Finish: Richard Petty was official declared the winner of the event.

Preceded by 1967 Buddy Shuman 250	NASCAR Grand National Races; 1967	Succeeded by 1967 Maryland 300
