= John Winger =

- Born: California, U.S.

NASCAR Cup Series career
- 3 races run over 1 year
- Best finish: 107th - 1968 NASCAR Grand National season
- First race: 1968 Islip 300
- Last race: 1968 Fonda 200
Wins	Top tens	Poles
0	0	0

John Winger from California is a retired NASCAR Grand National driver whose career involved three races of the 1968 season (1968 Islip 300, 1968 Maine 300, and the 1968 Fonda 200). Winger raced for 381 laps; starting in an average of 13th and finishing in an average of 19th. He managed to race 94.3 miles (151.8 km) in his one-year career.
