= Gibson House =

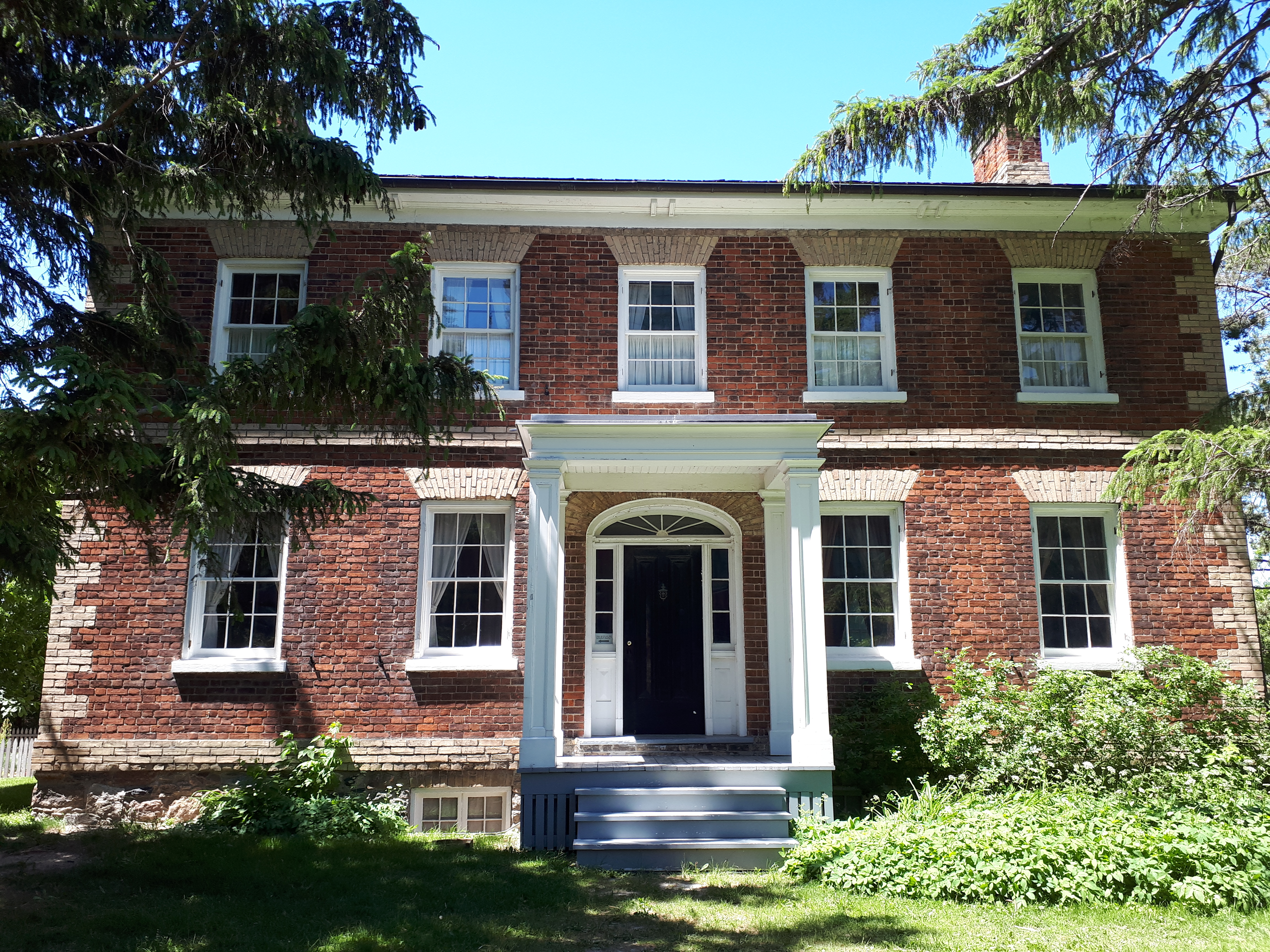
- Location: 5172 Yonge Street; Toronto, Ontario; M2N 5P6
- Coordinates: 43°46′10.5″N 79°24′53″W
- Type: historic house museum
- Website: Gibson House on toronto.ca

Ontario Heritage Act
- Official name: David Gibson House
- Designated: 15 December 1980

Gibson House is a historical museum in Toronto, Ontario, Canada. It is located on Yonge Street, in the North York Centre neighbourhood of the former city of North York.

== History ==
The property was first acquired by David Gibson, a Scottish immigrant, land surveyor, prior to the Rebellion of 1837. For his activities in the Rebellion, his house was destroyed and he was banished from Upper Canada. Gibson fled to nearby western New York, settling with his family in Lockport. Although he was threatened with losing his land, he continued to own the property in what was then York County, near Toronto. His wife was not banished, and she was able to travel between Lockport and Toronto to collect rents and profits on the farmstead.

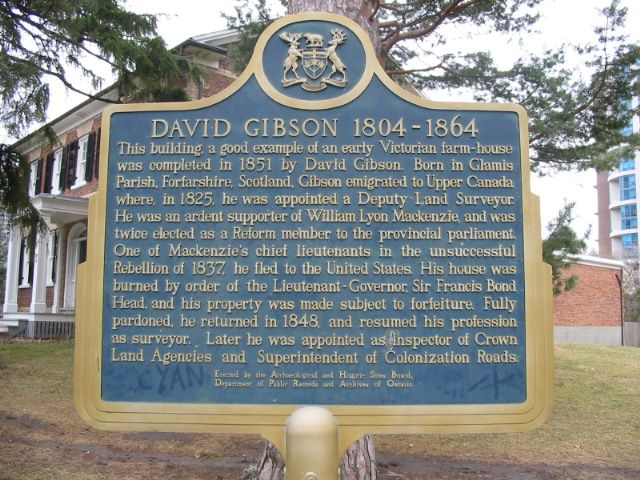
A provincial plaque tells of David Gibson's storied life.

In 1843, Gibson was pardoned, along with many who took part in the Rebellion. He returned with his family to York County in 1848 and built this house in 1851. Its style reflects a prosperous man, and some of its furniture and engravings reflect his U.S. residence in the motif.

Gibson House is set back from Yonge Street, one of the colony's pioneer roads and today often called the world's longest street. It is shielded from traffic, however, by construction hoarding for the Gibson Square Condominium development. Gibson House once welcomed carriages to its front door, now shielded from Yonge Street by construction. The house is one of the several museums operated by the City of Toronto.

Gibson established an apple orchard on the property in 1832, of which one tree remains at the corner of Yonge Street and Park Home Ave. The orchard (and the remaining tree) produce Tolman Sweet apples. In 2016, the tree was selected as a winner in a local survey of Toronto trees as a "Survivor". Grafts from it have been used to propagate the species.

== Heritage Protection ==
The red brick Georgian Revival farmhouse is protected under Part IV of the Ontario Heritage Act, designated by the former City of North York on December 15, 1980. The bylaw notes "David Gibson House, 1851 designed by David Gibson. The building is recommended for designation on architectural grounds because it is a finely restored example of a Georgian dwelling. The well balanced, symmetrical front facade consisting of nine equally spaced windows is highlighted by the doorway with its semi-elliptical fan transom and two side lights. David Gibson was an early farmer and surveyor and as a politician was an ardent supporter of William Lyon Mackenzie. For his part in the successful rebellion Gibson's house was burned and it was not until he returned from the United States in 1849 that the present house was begun."

The property is listed as a "Passport Place" by the National Trust for Canada, a featured historic site on their website.

== Programs ==
Tours are available, and a museum attached to the old house offers insight into the lives of a family which continued to reside here into the 20th Century. Children's programs welcome school groups and birthday parties, and certain days (e.g., First of July) offer guests a chance to play period games, sample kitchen treats, and help make ice cream.

== Affiliations ==
The Museum is affiliated with: CMA, CHIN, and Virtual Museum of Canada.

== See also ==
- List of museums in Toronto
- List of oldest buildings and structures in Toronto
