= 1971 Islip 250 =

Auto race held at Islip Speedway in 1971

Race details
- Race 30 of 48 in the 1971 NASCAR Winston Cup Series season
- Date: July 15, 1971; 54 years ago
- Official name: Islip 250
- Location: Islip Speedway, Islip, New York
- Course: Permanent racing facility
- Course length: 0.200 miles (0.322 km)
- Distance: 250 laps, 50.0 mi (80.0 km)
- Weather: Warm with temperatures of 80.1 °F (26.7 °C); wind speeds of 19 miles per hour (31 km/h)
- Average speed: 49.925 miles per hour (80.346 km/h)

Pole position
| Driver | Richard Petty | Petty Enterprises |

Most laps led
| Driver | Richard Petty | Petty Enterprises |
- Laps: 230

Winner
| No. 43 | Richard Petty | Petty Enterprises |

The 1971 Islip 250 was a NASCAR Winston Cup Series race that was conducted on July 15, 1971, at Islip Speedway in Islip, New York

Two black racers were involved in this race (Wendell Scott and George Wiltshire).

== Background ==
Islip Speedway was a .2-mile (320-meter) oval race track in Islip, New York which was open from 1947 until 1984. It is the smallest track ever to host NASCAR's Grand National Series, from 1964 to 1971. The first demolition derby took place at Islip Speedway in 1958. The idea was patented by Larry Mendelson, who worked at Islip Speedway.

== Race report ==
Two hundred and fifty green flag laps were done on a paved oval track spanning .200 miles (0.322 km). However, the race was shortened by twenty laps to 230 laps due to an error with the scoring system. At the time, Islip Speedway had a scoring system that looked like a Rolodex card system that would flip down cards with minutes (with numbers from 00 to 99) and seconds (with numbers from 00 to 59) on them. This would give the time elapsed in the race with some manual output; similar to the scoring system used at the very first Daytona 500 because electronic scoring would be decades away from being a reality. The first column would count the number of minutes elapsed with the second column would count the number of seconds elapsed. It would be rare to see a race last for more than ninety-nine minutes and fifty-nine seconds (approximately 1.6 hours) until NASCAR started lengthening their races in the 1970s.

The time of the race was fifty-five minutes and seventeen seconds. Speeds were considered to be 49.925 miles per hour (80.346 km/h) for the average and 46.133 miles per hour (74.244 km/h) for the pole. Richard Petty managed to defeat Friday Hassler by out-lapping him twice. Frog Fagan was the lone Canadian in the race making his final start in a Cup Series vehicle.

Fagan would race for a single lap before quitting in Neil Castles' #06 Dodge vehicle. In addition to leading the race, Richard Petty led all 230 laps of the race. Ken Meisenhelder's vehicle overheated on lap 27 just like Pete Hamilton's vehicle would overheat on lap 36. John Sears noticed the axle on his vehicle was acting weirdly on lap 48 while the ignition on Bill Champion's vehicle stopped working on lap 71. Bobby Mausgrover noticed that his vehicle's brakes stopped working on lap 102 while battery problems would relegate Ed Negre to the sidelines on lap 106.

Bill Seifert noticed that his vehicle's transmission was developing problems on lap 113 while Jerry Churchill blew his engine on lap 119. J.D. McDuffie had to leave the race due to a missing vehicular rear end on lap 132 while Larry Baumel's vehicle would be cursed with transmission problems on lap 142. Henley Gray would notice that his vehicle's brakes stop working on lap 200; forcing his premature exit from the race.

Benny Listman would do his only NASCAR Cup Series race here. Four automobile manufacturers were predominant during this race: Ford, Dodge, Plymouth and Mercury. Notable crew chiefs that participated in the event were Lee Gordon, Vic Ballard, Dale Inman and Wesley Wiltshire.

The winner would receive a prize bounty of $1,500 ($11,925 when adjusted for inflation) while the last place finisher would receive a paltry $10 ($79 when adjusted for inflation) prize bounty. Total winnings for this track would be $8,685 ($69,045 when adjusted for inflation). This would be the final race in NASCAR's top series for this track; the track would be demolished in 1984 to become a cookie factory. All races shorter than 250 miles would be axed by the NASCAR organization; in the sport's modernization process.

=== Qualifying ===
| Grid | No. | Driver | Manufacturer |
|---|---|---|---|
| 1 | 43 | Richard Petty | '71 Plymouth |
| 2 | 12 | Bobby Allison | '69 Mercury |
| 3 | 91 | Pete Hamilton | '71 Chevrolet |
| 4 | 39 | Friday Hassler | '70 Chevrolet |
| 5 | 10 | Bill Champion | '71 Ford |
| 6 | 6 | Neil Castles | '69 Dodge |
| 7 | 48 | James Hylton | '71 Ford |
| 8 | 23 | Jabe Thomas | '69 Plymouth |
| 9 | 67 | Elmo Langley | '69 Mercury |
| 10 | 4 | John Sears | '69 Dodge |
| 11 | 8 | Ed Negre | '69 Ford |
| 12 | 24 | Cecil Gordon | '69 Mercury |
| 13 | 74 | Bill Shirey | '69 Plymouth |
| 14 | 49 | G.C. Spencer | '69 Plymouth |
| 15 | 19 | Henley Gray | '69 Ford |
| 16 | 70 | J.D. McDuffie | '69 Mercury |
| 17 | 34 | Wendell Scott | '69 Ford |
| 18 | 28 | Bill Hollar | '69 Ford |
| 19 | 41 | Ken Meisenhelder | '69 Chevrolet |
| 20 | 77 | Charlie Roberts | '70 Ford |
| 21 | 30 | Walter Ballard | '71 Ford |
| 22 | 68 | Larry Baumel | '69 Ford |
| 23 | 45 | Bill Seifert | '70 Ford |
| 24 | 64 | Dick May | '69 Mercury |
| 25 | 40 | D.K. Ulrich | '70 Ford |
| 26 | 86 | Bobby Mausgrover | '69 Dodge |
| 27 | 73 | Jerry Churchill | '69 Ford |
| 28 | 62 | Bennis Listman | '69 Dodge |
| 29 | 89 | George Wiltshire | '70 Plymouth |
| 30 | 25 | James Cox | '69 Plymouth |
| 31 | 96 | Richard Childress | '70 Chevrolet |
| 32 | 06 | Frog Fagan | '70 Dodge |
| 33 | 79 | Frank Warren | '69 Dodge |

== Finishing order ==
1. Richard Petty (No. 43)
2. Friday Hassler† (No. 39)
3. Elmo Langley† (No. 67)
4. Bobby Allison (No. 12)
5. G.C. Spencer† (No. 49)
6. James Hylton† (No. 48)
7. Neil Castles (No. 6)
8. Cecil Gordon† (No. 24)
9. Jabe Thomas† (No. 23)
10. Walter Ballard (No. 30)
11. Wendell Scott† (No. 34)
12. D.K. Ulrich (No. 40)
13. Henley Gray* (No. 19)
14. Bill Hollar† (No. 28)
15. Larry Baumel* (No. 68)
16. J.D. McDuffie*† (No. 70)
17. Jerry Churchill*† (No. 73)
18. Bill Seifert* (No. 45)
19. Ed Negre*† (No. 8)
20. Bob Mausgrover* (No. 86)
21. Bill Champion*† (No. 10)
22. John Sears*† (No. 4)
23. Pete Hamilton* (No. 91)
24. Ken Meisenhelder* (No. 41)
25. Bill Shirey* (No. 74)
26. Bennis Listman* (No. 62)
27. Dick May*† (No. 64)
28. George Wiltshire* (No. 89)
29. Charlie Roberts* (No. 77)
30. James Cox* (No. 26)
31. Richard Childress* (No. 96)
32. Frog Fagan*† (No. 06)
33. Frank Warren* (No. 79)

† signifies that the driver is known to be deceased
* Driver failed to finish race

| Preceded by 1971 Albany-Saratoga 250 | Richard Petty's Career Wins; 1960-1984 | Succeeded by 1971 Northern 300 |
