= David Gibson (Canadian politician) =

Scottish surveyor and Canadian politician (1804-1864)

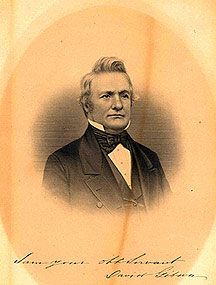
- Circa 1850s representation of Gibson
- Born: March 9, 1804; Forfarshire, Scotland
- Died: January 25, 1864 (aged 59); Quebec City, Quebec, Canada
- Occupation: Surveyor

David Gibson (March 9, 1804 – January 25, 1864) was a surveyor, farmer and political figure in Upper Canada.

He was born in Forfarshire, Scotland in 1804. He apprenticed with a land surveyor in Scotland and came to Upper Canada seeking employment. In 1825, he was named a deputy surveyor of roads and, in 1828, surveyor of highways in the Home District. In 1831, he became associated with William Lyon Mackenzie as a Reformer. He was elected to the Legislative Assembly of Upper Canada representing 1st York in 1834 and 1836.

He reluctantly joined the rebellion of 1837 and protected the loyalist prisoners at Montgomery's Tavern from abuse. However, despite this, the governor Sir Francis Bond Head ordered his farm burned. Gibson fled to Lockport, New York, where he was employed as an engineer for the Erie Canal. In 1848, having been pardoned in 1843, he returned to his farm and was hired as a provincial land surveyor. In 1853, he was given the post of inspector of crown lands agencies and superintendent of colonization roads in Canada West. He also supervised the surveying of roads in the Algoma District from 1861 to 1862. For a time, he also operated a large sawmill in the Parry Sound region, which was later taken over by William Beatty.

He died at Quebec in 1864.

== Legacy ==
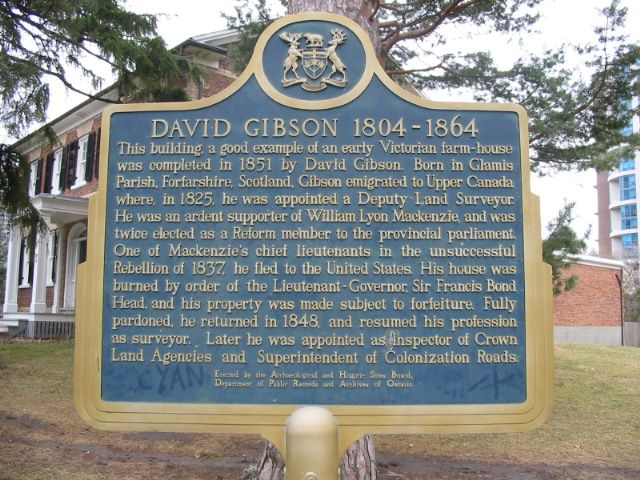
A provincial plaque tells of David Gibson's storied life.

An Ontario Historical Plaque was erected in front of the Gibson House Museum in North York Centre, Toronto, Ontario by the province to commemorate David Gibson's role in Ontario's heritage.
