= Frog Fagan =

Canadian racing driver

Harold "Frog" Fagan
- Born: November 3, 1940; Willowdale, Toronto, Ontario, Canada
- Died: August 6, 1993 (aged 52)

NASCAR Cup Series career
- 20 races run over 4 years
- Best finish: 89th (1971)
- First race: 1967 Capital City 300 (Virginia State Fairgrounds)
- Last race: 1971 Islip 250 (Islip Speedway)
Wins	Top tens	Poles
0	1	0

Harold "Frog" Fagan (November 3, 1940 – August 6, 1993) was a NASCAR Winston Cup driver from the Toronto subdivision of Willowdale, Ontario, Canada.

== History ==
Harold Fagan is the son of Mrs. Yvonne Fagan (who was the owner of the Northway Restaurant on Yonge Street north of Sheppard). Fagan served his country in the Royal Canadian Navy and would go to his mother's restaurant while on shore leave. His mother's 1957 Dodge Custom Royal would be Fagan's first ride; he would punch some holes in the muffler to make it sound better. Pinecrest Speedway was Fagan's first ever experience racing stock cars at any level.

Fagan had one top-ten finish (eighth at the 1968 Fireball 300 race that took place at the Asheville-Weaverville Speedway in Weaverville, North Carolina). Fagan also accomplished 2297 laps of racing experience; the equivalent of 2,018.8 miles or 3,248.9 kilometres. His monetary achievement was earning $6,305 ($50,123.97 when adjusted for inflation) in total career earnings. On average, Fagan started his races in 28th place and finished them in 23rd place. Fagan's career stretched for four years and twenty races. The majority of Fagan's races were driven in Ford vehicles; most notably in the No. 95 entry owned by Neil Castles while also racing in the No. 77 entry driven during his rookie season in 1967. Other manufacturers that Fagan raced for included Dodge (with the No. 06 entry)

== See also ==
- Don Biederman
