= Roy Trantham =

- Born: February 10, 1941; Asheville, North Carolina, U.S.
- Died: March 17, 2014 (aged 73); Palm City, Florida, U.S.
- Cause of death: Leukemia

NASCAR Cup Series career
- 5 races run over 1 year
- Best finish: 60th (1968)
- First race: 1968 Southern 500 (Darlington)
- Last race: 1968 National 500 (Charlotte)
Wins	Top tens	Poles
0	1	0

Roy Trantham (February 10, 1941 – March 17, 2014) was an American stock car racing driver. A veteran short-track driver, he also competed in five NASCAR Grand National Series races.

== Career ==
A native of Asheville, North Carolina, Trantham was a veteran of short-track racing in the southern Appalachians, and made his debut in the NASCAR Grand National Series in the 1968 Southern 500 at Darlington Raceway. He finished 34th in the event, and went on to run four more Grand National races that year, posting a best finish of tenth at Martinsville Speedway.

After his racing career, Trantam moved first to the United States Virgin Islands, then to Palm City, Florida, where he died on March 17, 2014 following a battle with leukemia.
