= David Mote =

American racing car driver

David Mote (October 3, 1940 in Siler City, North Carolina – May 17, 2010) was a NASCAR Grand National driver who competed only in the 1968 season with 396 laps accumulated and 376.3 miles (605.6 km) of racing completed. His first race was the 1968 Ashville 300 and his final race was the 1968 Northern 300. Mote's total winnings are $1,150 ($10,647.13 when adjusted for inflation).
