= Bud Lindemann =

American motorsport announcer

Gordon "Bud" Lindemann (August 22, 1925 in Chicago, Illinois – November 13, 1983) was a pioneer in motor sports broadcasting.

== Early history ==
Lindemann graduated from high school in 1940. He joined the United States Coast Guard during World War II, and was stationed on the USS Eastwind (IX-234) in the North Atlantic. While in the service, Gordon met his future wife Kay and they were married on February 9, 1945. Lindemann worked briefly in radio in Boston following the war before moving to Grand Rapids, Michigan, in 1946, working at WGRD there.

== Motorsports career ==
"Big Bud" (another nickname) then became actively involved in motorsports in the mid-1950s as an announcer at the now-defunct Grand Rapids Speedrome. He later worked at the Berlin Raceway and the Kalamazoo Speedway until the mid-1960s.

In 1964, while working for WZZM-TV in Grand Rapids, Michigan, he developed a program called Autoscope. The show featured local races as well as some national events. Autoscope became a local success, and in 1967 Lindemann expanded by forming his own production company, Car & Track Productions, owned by Lindemann himself and operated by many of his own family members. Subsequently, he sought to produce the first nationally syndicated television show devoted to motor sports and many additional auto forums. Entitled Car and Track, the show was carried by over 160 stations across the country and covered over 250 racing and auto events. In 1975, Car and Track ended its eight-year run on CBS. The show was resurrected for reruns on the cable network Speedvision (now the Speed Channel) in 1996.

In 1976, Car & Track Productions began producing racing features for major sports shows, including ABC's Wide World of Sports and CBS Sports Spectacular. Lindemann also initiated another new trend by producing ten-minute motor sports-related theatrical shorts. It is believed that he continued these until his next creative venture in 1979 when he produced a new series featuring author George Plimpton of Paper Lion fame in 1979. Entitled The Ultimate High, the program followed George as he participated in various sporting endeavors. Some of these included skydiving, hang gliding, kayaking and windsurfing. Plimpton was also filmed driving a Carl Haas Can-Am car and sharing an IndyCar ride with a rookie driver named Bobby Rahal.

== Death ==
Lindemann died of cancer on November 13, 1983.

== Career award ==
In 1991, Gordon "Bud" Lindemann was inducted into the Michigan Motorsports Hall of Fame.
