= North York City Centre (building) =

Office building in Toronto, Canada

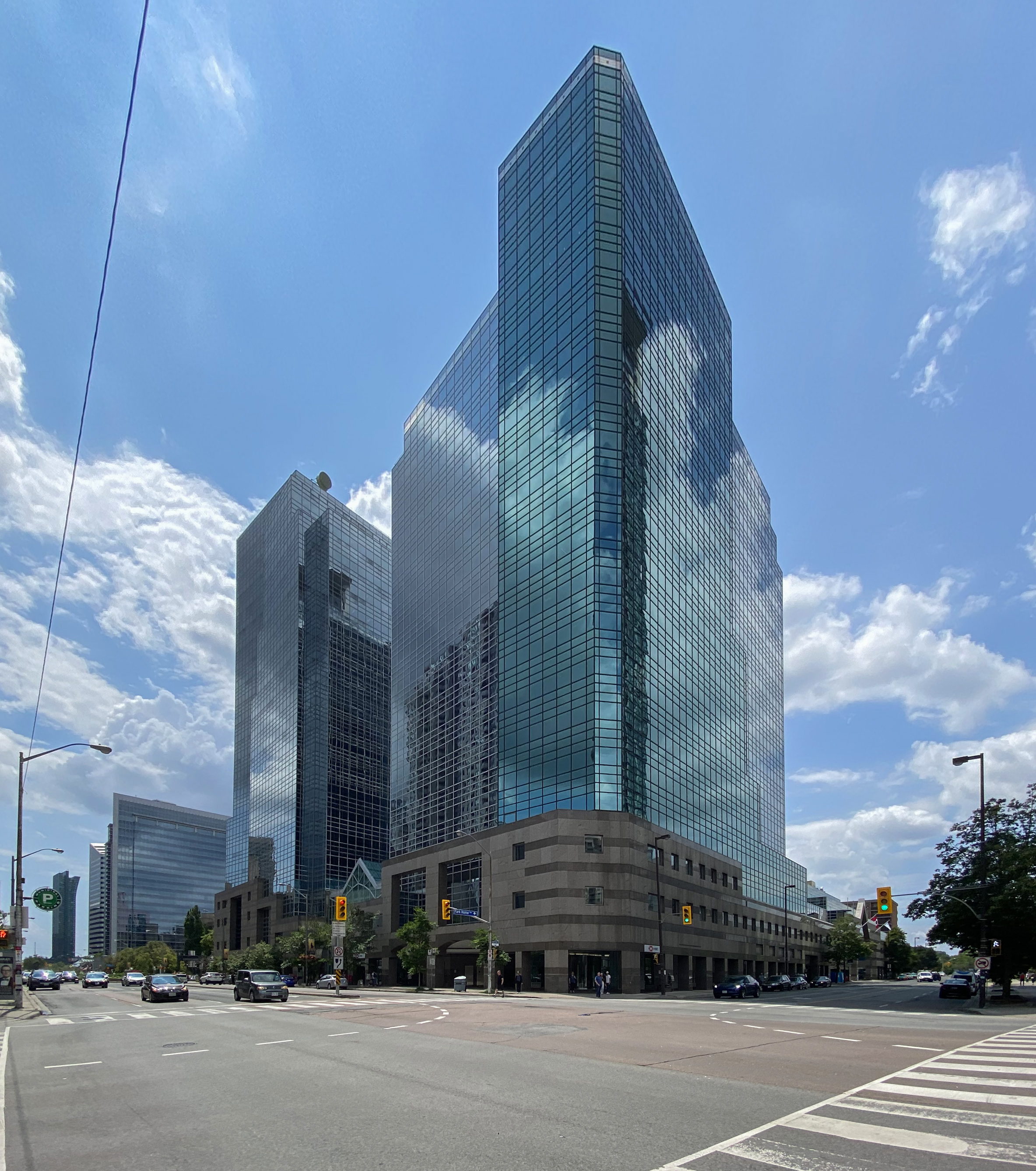
- Interactive map of the North York City Centre area

General information
- Status: Completed
- Type: Office, Retail, Hotel
- Location: Toronto, Ontario, Canada, 5120 Yonge St, 5140 Yonge St, 5150 Yonge St, 5160 Yonge St, 5 Park Home Avenue, 3 Park Home Avenue
- Coordinates: 43.7686°N 79.4133°W
- Construction started: 1985
- Completed: 1987, 1989
- Opened: 1987
- Cost: $250,000,000 CAD
- Owner: PenYork Properties I Inc. Managed by GWL Realty Advisors

Height
- Height: 62 m / 203 ft

Technical details
- Floor count: 18, 24

Design and construction
- Architecture firm: Moriyama & Teshima Architects
- Developer: Avro Group

Other information
- Public transit: TTC Subway Station, North York Centre

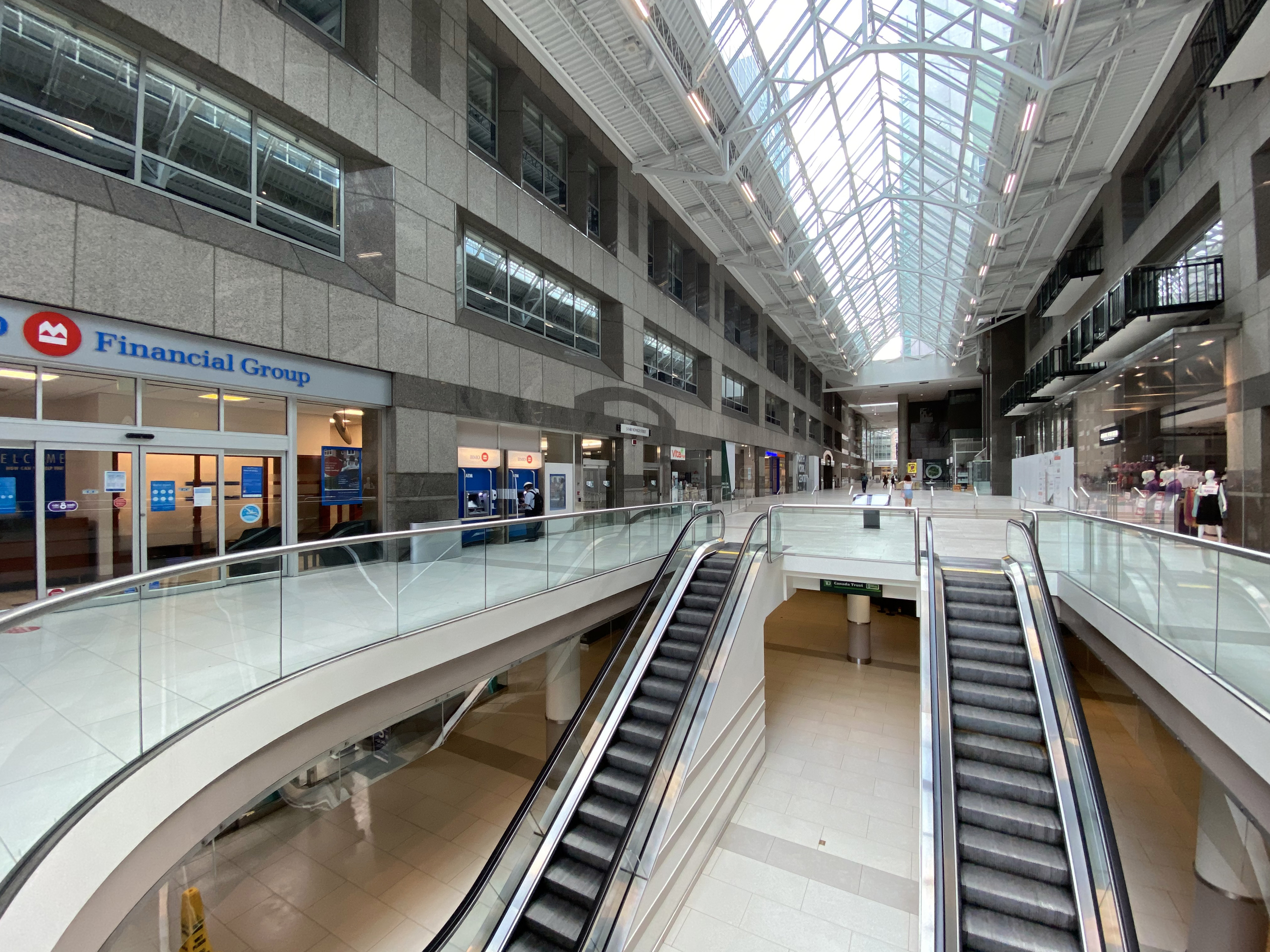
North York City Centre mall interior

North York City Centre is an office tower, shopping mall, and hotel complex in Toronto, Ontario, Canada. It was designed by Moriyama Teshima Architects, and was completed in 1989 by developer Avro Group. It is home to the North York Central Library, secondary offices of the City of Toronto government, and other corporate headquarters. The shopping mall contains over 80 shops, as well as a food court. The hotel is known as Novotel North York.

== History ==
The complex was a $250 million municipal showpiece by the developer Avro Group. The Toronto Public Library alone cost $20 million, known as North York Central Library. The south tower, located at 5140 Yonge Street, contains a computer-controlled carillon, with 14 bells made in Holland, on top of its 24 story roof. Construction for the complex began in September 1985. The first office tower, the shopping mall, the Novotel Hotel, and the Toronto Public Library opened in 1987, with the second office tower being completed in 1989.

== Description ==
The complex contains two office towers, the first being completed in 1987, at 5140 Yonge Street, which stands at 24 floors, and the second north tower, 5160 Yonge Street, which stands at 18 floors, being completed in 1989. The shopping mall is located at 5150 Yonge Street. The Hotel, Novotel North York, completed in 1987, is located at 3 Park Home Avenue. The Toronto Public Library was completed and opened in early June 1987, which contains 6 floors, located at 5120 Yonge Street. There are additional offices at 5 Park Home Avenue.

== Ownership ==
The land of which the complex stands is owned by the City of Toronto, which is ground leased to developers, originally City Centre Development Corporation (under Avro Group, the developer), which later transferred ownership to PenYork Properties I Inc. The property is managed by GWL Realty Advisors.

== Transit Connection ==
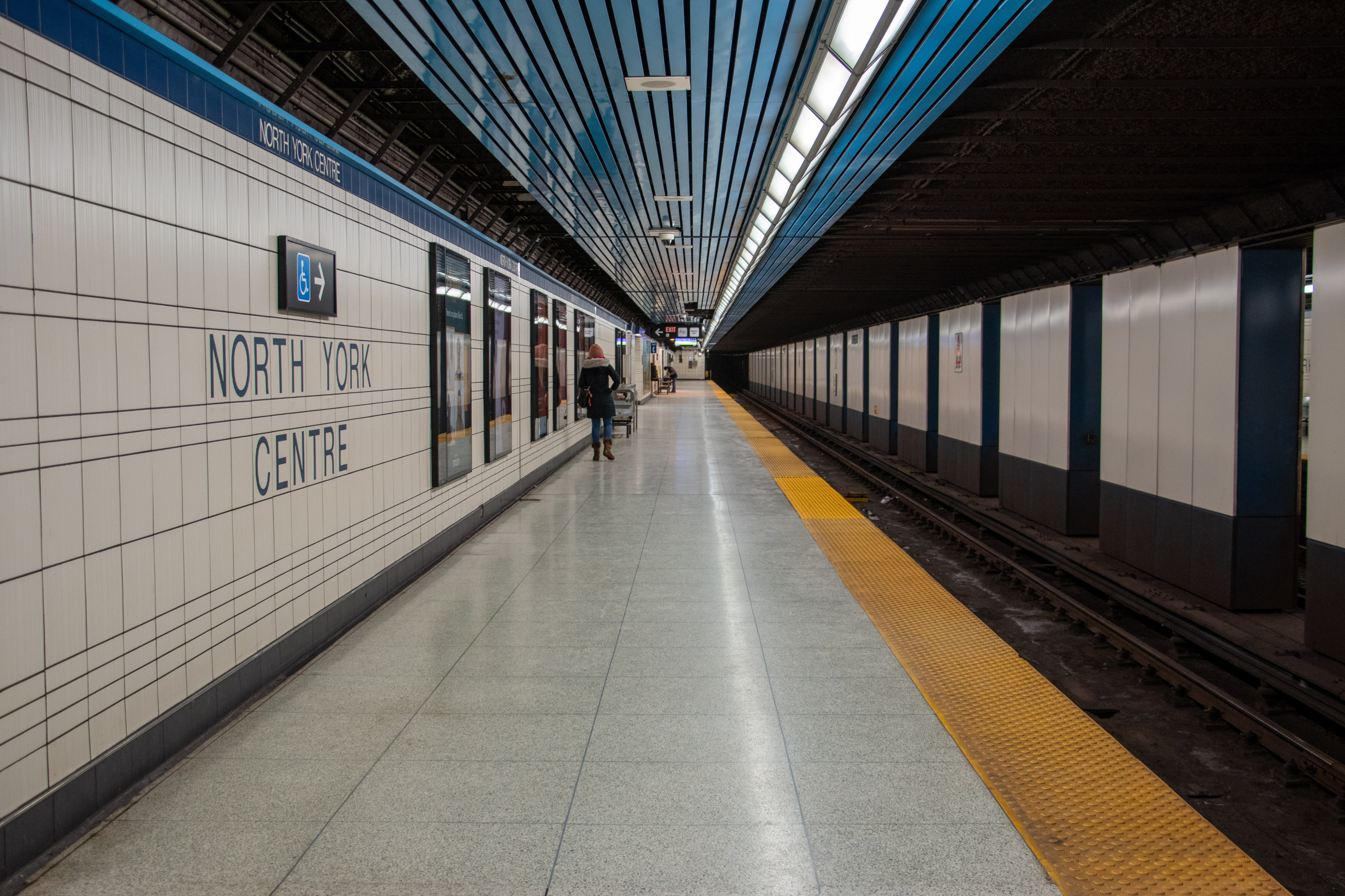
North York Centre TTC Subway Station

The complex is directly connected to Line 1 Yonge-University subway line of the TTC, at North York Centre station. Prior to construction of this complex in 1987, Line 1 Yonge-University terminated at Finch Station, and the next station south of that was Sheppard. However, when this complex was constructed in 1987, North York Centre station was added between Sheppard and Finch, due to a rapid increase of jobs in the area, particularly due to the construction of this complex. The station is directly connected underground to this complex as well as other nearby buildings. The new station opened on July 18, 1987, and cost $25 million to construct.

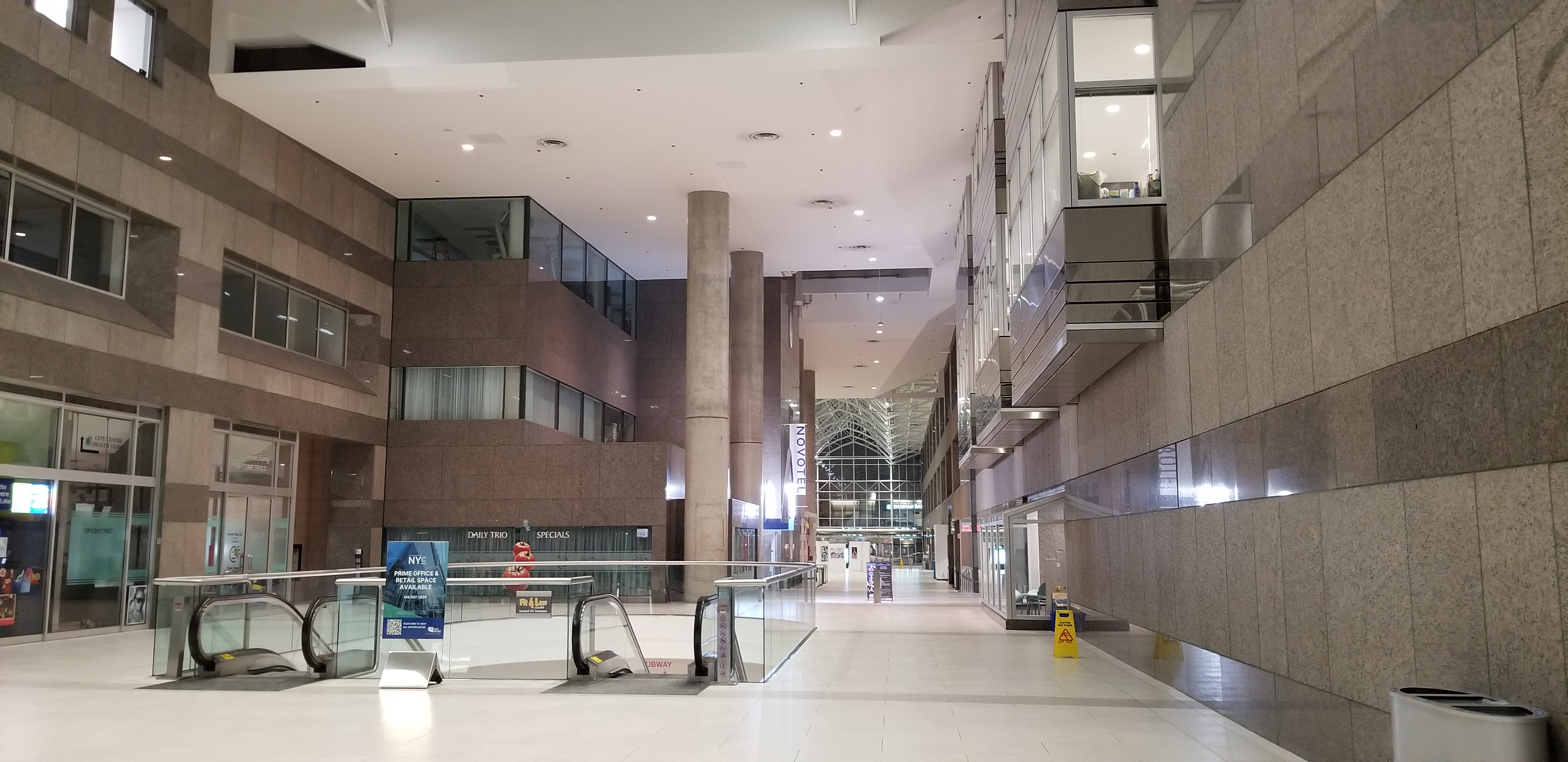
Inside the mall of North York City Centre

== Nearby Landmarks ==
The 24-storey, glass-clad structure overlooks Mel Lastman Square and North York City Hall. It is across the street from Empress Walk.

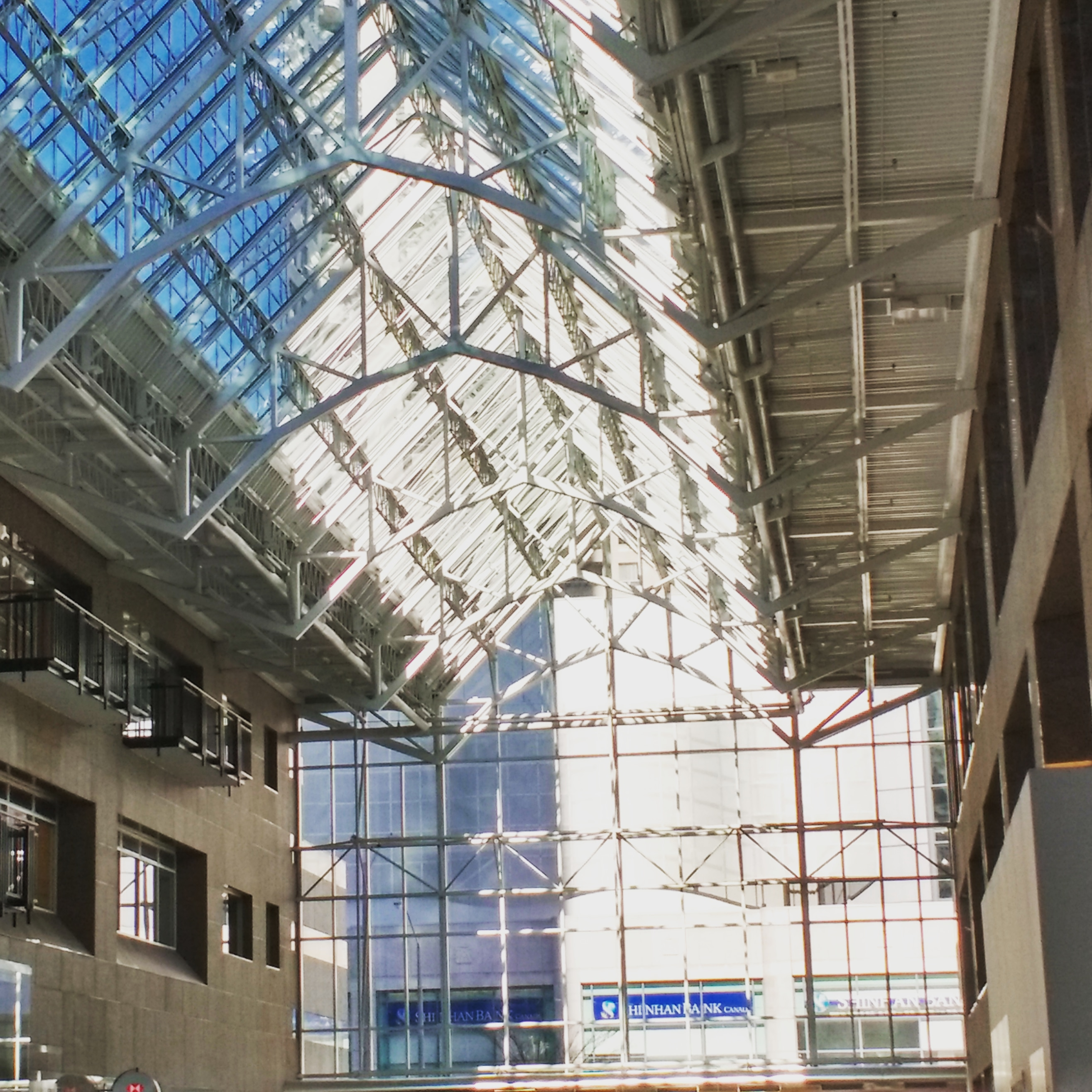
North York Centre mall roof detail

== See also ==
- North York Centre station
- North York City Centre
- North York Central Library
- North York Civic Centre
- Mel Lastman Square
