= Empress Walk =

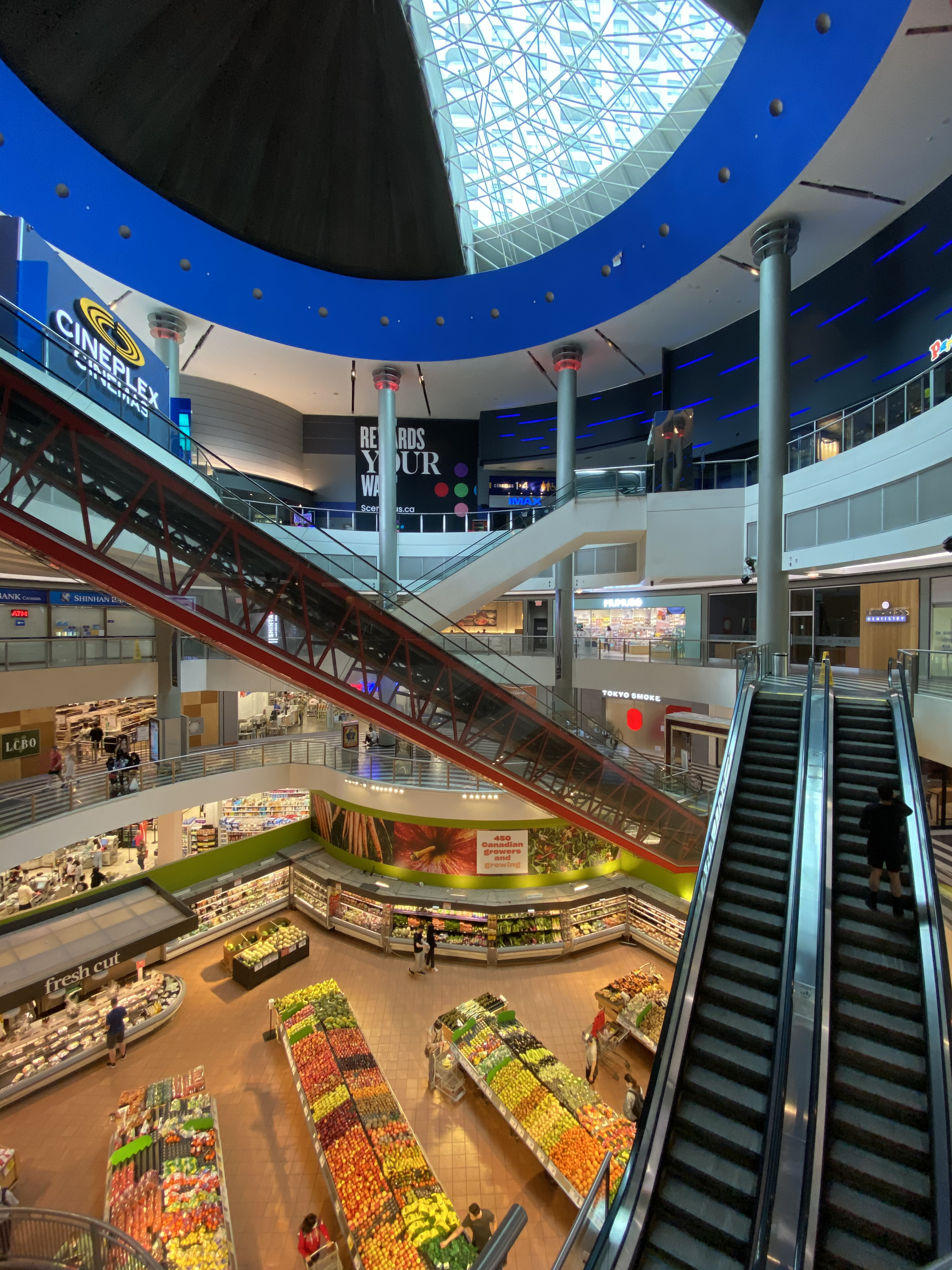
- Interactive map of the Empress Walk area

General information
- Type: condominium and retail complex
- Location: 5095 Yonge Street; Toronto, Ontario; M2N 6Y7
- Construction started: 1995
- Completed: Phase 1 - 1997; Phase 2 - 2000

Technical details
- Floor count: 34

Design and construction
- Developer: Menkes Developments Ltd.

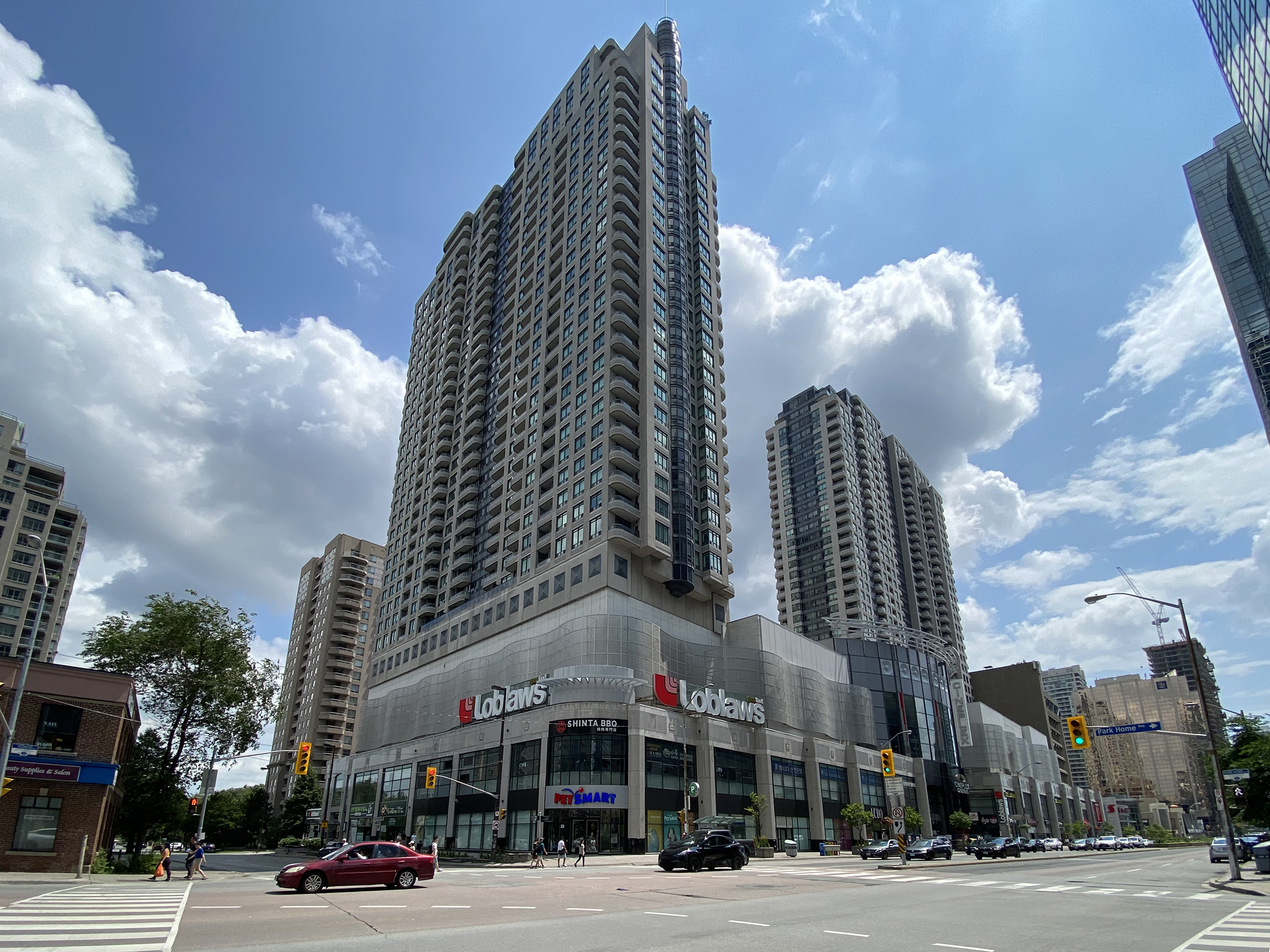
View from Yonge Street

Empress Walk is a large Canadian condominium and retail complex in Toronto, Ontario, Canada. It is located at the intersection of Yonge Street and Empress Avenue in the North York Centre area of the North York district It was developed by Canadian-developers Menkes Developments Ltd. Phase 1 was completed in 1997 and Phase 2 was completed in 2000. It became an important retail complex in North York following its construction.

The podium of the complex is a three-storey retail mall. It covers 240,000 square feet (22,000 m^{2}) topped with a 95 feet (29 m) dome, that highlights one of the longest unsupported escalators in North America to give access to the movie theatre from the ground floor. There is a 3,035-seat Cineplex Cinemas movie multiplex featuring a state of the art IMAX Theatre. The lowest level has underground access to the North York Centre subway station.

Above the retail complex are two 34-storey residential towers, known as the Pinnacle and Royal Pinnacle, with a total of 745 units between them. Major retail anchors inside Empress Walk include LCBO, Shoppers Drug Mart, Cineplex Cinemas, PetSmart, and Dollarama.

== History ==
Since the 1970s, local politician Mel Lastman wanted to turn central North York into a second downtown for Toronto. Until 1998, a separate city from Toronto with the regional government of Metropolitan Toronto. Lastman began a wave of development proposals that eventually led to a large number of high-rise and government buildings being constructed along Yonge Street, leading to the creation of North York Centre within the larger existing neighbourhood of Willowdale.

Menkes Developments Ltd. constructed many of the condominium complexes in North York Centre including, Gibson Square, Ultima, Broadway. It initially proposed the development in the early 1990s, Toronto Centre for the Arts and other developments were already underway in North York at the time. In the mid-1990s, Menkes put forward a proposal for a mall and residential complex in the center of North York Centre. This move coincided with the 1998 Toronto amalgamation where the surrounding cities and one borough became part of the City of Toronto. While controversial, many districts such as North York prospered in the years following the move.

Empress Walk was built as part of Mel Lastman's bid to create a downtown in North York to rival Toronto's. Empress Walk remains a hub of activity, while also spurring on new condominium projects being built north and south of it today. Its residential building, which was completed at the same time as the retail complex, was for decades one of the tallest buildings in North York until being surpassed by newer developments such as the Hullmark Centre.

Empress Walk and other major developments in the nearby area meant North York Centre became a second central business district for the City of Toronto from the 1990s onwards. The plans for Empress Walk meant that the North York Centre station could be integrated with the new mall, giving residents of the towers access to the Toronto subway system.

In 2000, the property was acquired by RioCan REIT, a Canadian real estate investment trust.

In 2022, the mall completed an exterior renovation and renamed the mall to RioCan Empress. Dropping the jester themed logo.

On October 25th, 2025, Loblaws which was an original anchor tenant of the concourse level closed their store, to be converted to another Loblaw Companies store, T&T Supermarket

== Nearby ==
Behind the Empress Walk complex on its east side is Princess Park, commemorating the original sites of the first municipal building and fire hall of North York. It features the façade of the former Township of North York Municipal Offices from the 1940s, while the bell/clock tower from the fire hall has been reconstructed and serves as the centrepiece for the park.

Across the street, and connected via the TTC tunnel, are Mel Lastman Square, the North York Civic Centre, the North York Central Library and Novotel. Next door, and connected via a passageway on concourse mall level, is the 5075 Yonge Street tower, with Scotiabank and Upper Madison College.

== Tenants ==
=== Anchor tenants ===
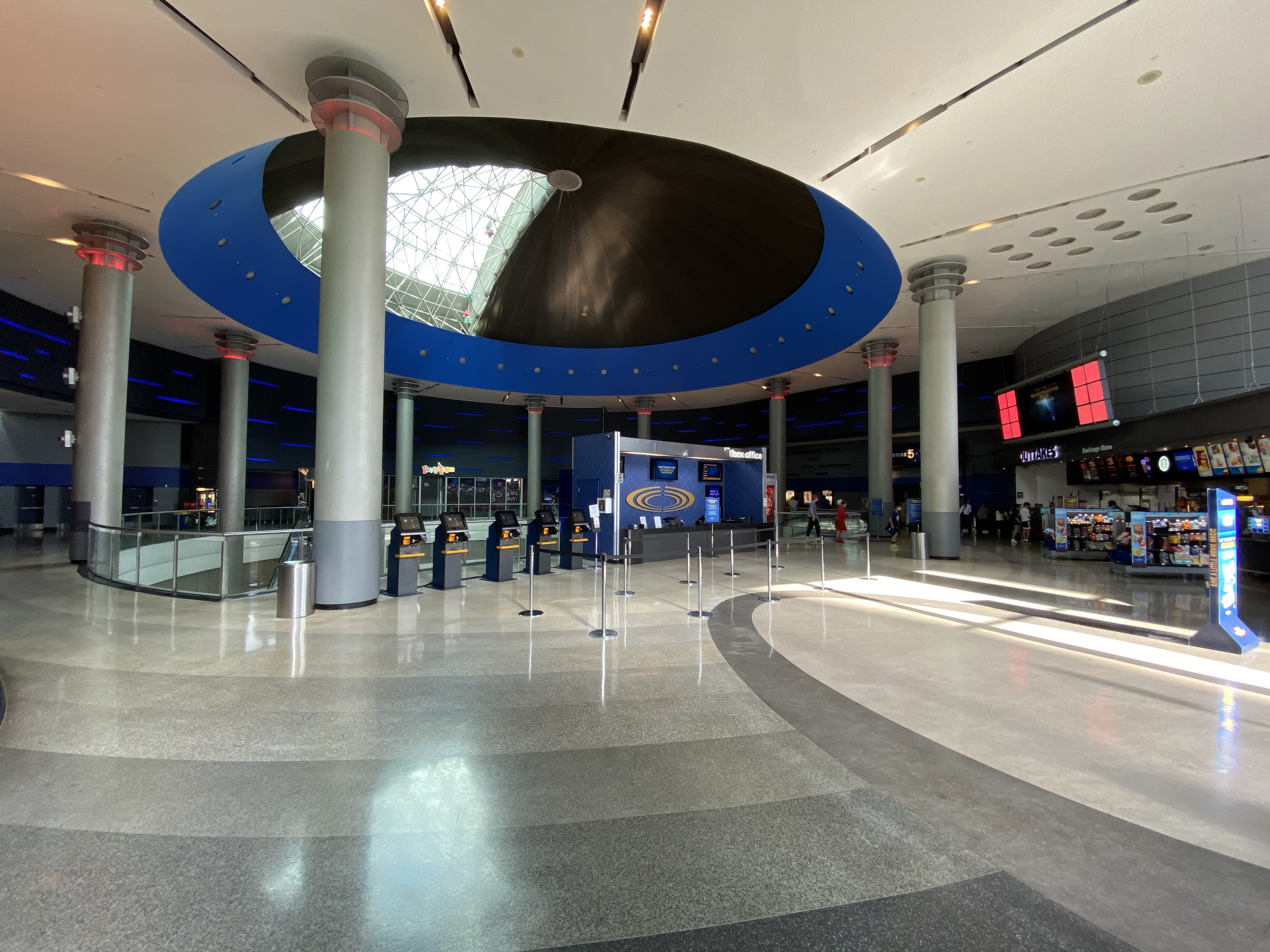
Empress Walk Cineplex Cinemas (formerly Empire Theatres and earlier SilverCity).

- Cineplex Cinemas (originally Famous Players SilverCity & Empire Theatres) (Cineplex had merged with Famous Players in the 1990s and sold its Empress Walk location as it had a nearby Cineplex Sheppard Grande theatre at Sheppard Avenue and Yonge Street. In 2013, when Empire Theatres exited the Ontario market, Cineplex reacquired and renovated the Empress Walk location, while the Cineplex Sheppard Grande was demolished in 2016 as part of a major redevelopment Yonge Sheppard Centre.
- Shoppers Drug Mart (formerly Best Buy Canada re-branded from Future Shop, prior to that Sport Chek). Shoppers Drug Mart had a smaller store south of RioCan Empress at the base of the Ultima Condominiums which was part of the Broadway by Menkes masterplan community, this store closed in 2020 and moved to RioCan Empress.
- Loblaws Empress Market (this is the first time Loblaws operated an underground store. Final day of business was October 25, 2025, afterwards closed for renovation into another Loblaw Companies supermarket, T&T Supermarket, which will open in 2026.)

=== List of tenants ===
- LCBO
- Shinhan Bank
- Wendy's
- Dollarama (formerly Fabricland and originally Tower Records)
- PetSmart (formerly 1st floor of Solutions, Staples, prior to that; Indigo Books and Music originally)
- F45 Training
- Ichibian Asian AYCE
- The Second Cup
- Toronto Dance Salsa
- RBC Meeting Place (formerly part of Milestones Grill and Bar)
- Shinta BBQ (formerly 2nd floor of Indigo Books and Music)
- Petit Potato (formerly part of Milestones Grill and Bar) Exterior Access Only
- Real Fruit Bubble Tea
- There are also retailers and clinics on the Yonge and Empress frontages of the building with exterior access only.
