= North York City Centre =

Coordinates: 43.769°N 79.413°W

- Business district
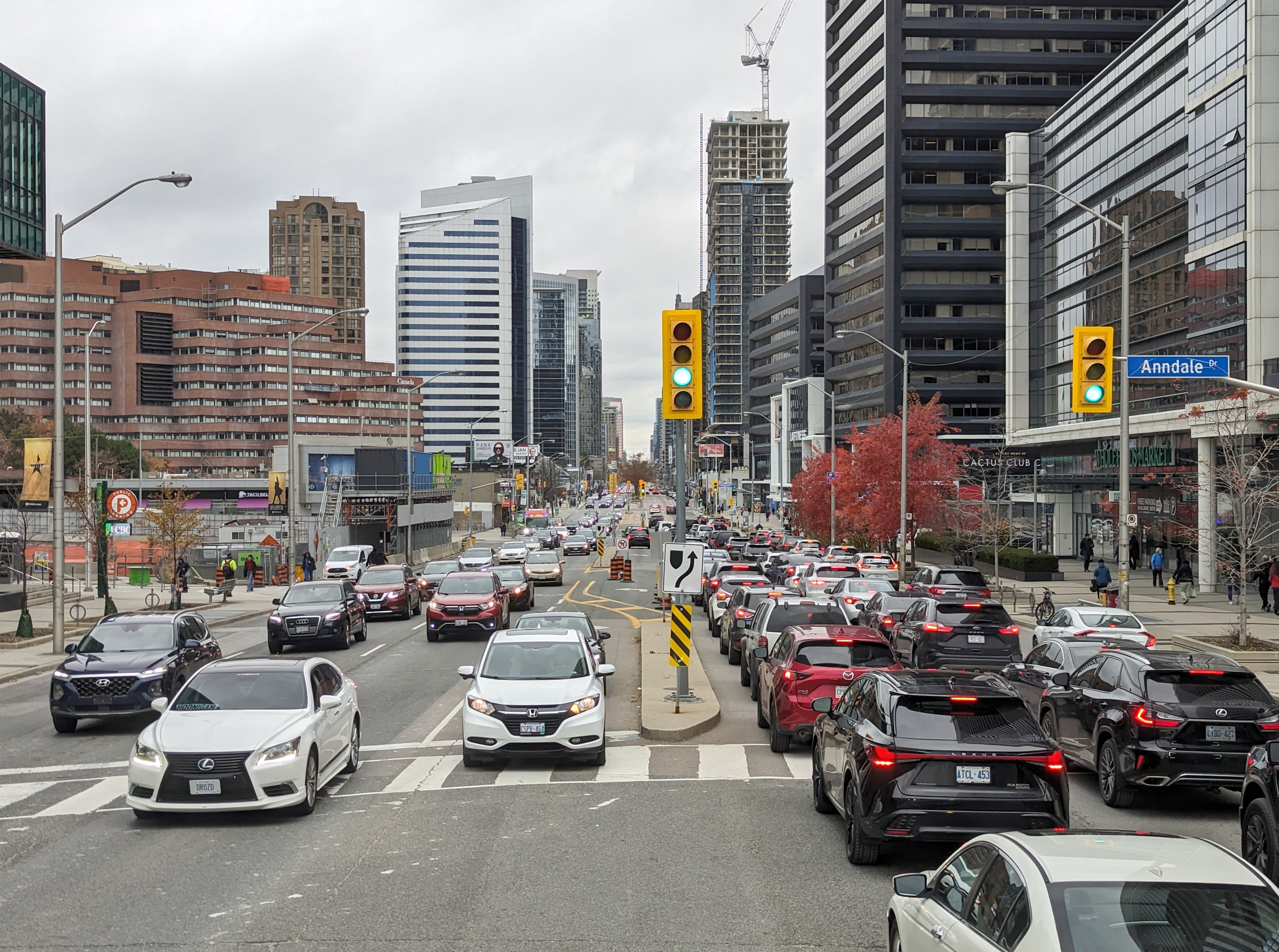
- North York City Centre, looking north along Yonge Street

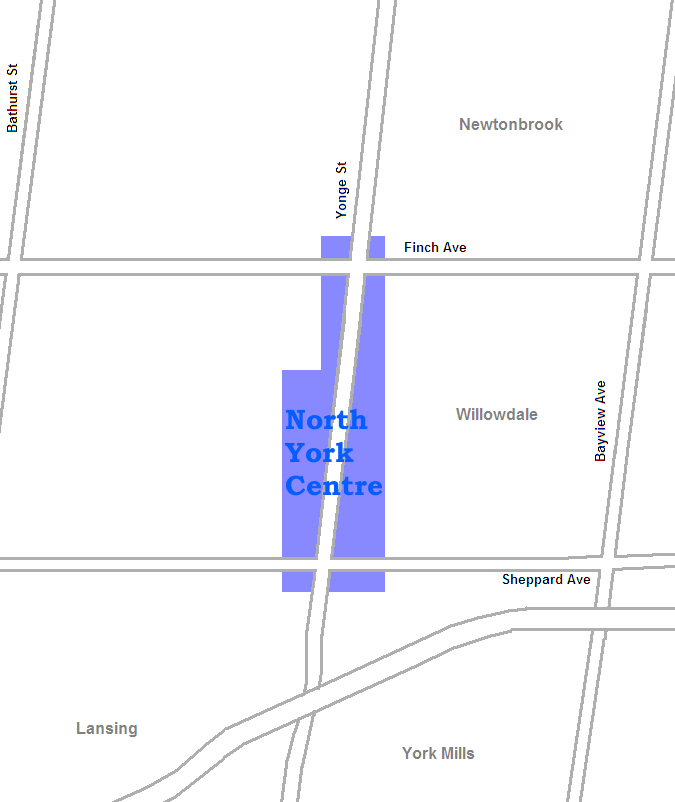
- Municipality established: 1850 York Township
- Changed municipality: 1922 North York from York Township
- Changed municipality: 1998 Toronto from North York

North York City Centre is a central business district in Toronto, Ontario, Canada in the administrative district of North York. It is located along Yonge Street, between just south of Sheppard Avenue northward to Finch Avenue with its focus around Mel Lastman Square, a civic square, and spreads eastwards and westwards a few blocks, generally as far as Doris Avenue and Beecroft Road. The district is a high-density district of condominium and office towers with ground-floor commercial uses along the wide six lanes of Yonge Street.

The district was developed following the extension of the Yonge subway north to Finch Station. In the 1970s and 80s, the former City of North York encouraged the development of the area as a downtown, locating its civic offices, a public square, a central library, an arts centre and an aquatic centre on the west side of Yonge, about 600 metres north of Sheppard. The area's growth increased following the opening of North York Centre station at Mel Lastman Square and the Sheppard subway line. A shopping mall and cinemas were developed on the east side of Yonge Street across from Mel Lastman Square in the 1990s.

It is mostly located in the larger official neighbourhood of Willowdale, part of the former city of North York, and a former municipality (postal district) of its own, but also abuts the Lansing neighbourhood on the east side of Yonge Street near Sheppard Avenue. Following the amalgamation of North York with the rest of Toronto, North York City Centre became the largest of four central business districts in the new city outside Downtown Toronto. All of the civic facilities were retained by the new City of Toronto.

== History ==
In the 1800s, the forests in the area were cleared for farmland, around settlements made by Jacob Cummer and David Gibson alongside Yonge Street, which was the main road for travel from Toronto northward, and which served as Provincial Highway 11 from 1920 until 1998. The postal village of Willowdale was established within York County. North York Township was formed in 1923 from York Township. To the east and west, low-density single-family housing subdivisions were built beginning in the 1920s. As the area's population grew, the roadside became lined with commercial establishments, some being one-level highway arterial-type uses such as gas stations, with others being tightly knit two-storey buildings.

The post-World War II period saw the rapid growth of the suburbs of Toronto. To accommodate the growth, the township was changed into the Borough of North York after Metropolitan Toronto was split off from York County in 1953. The large expansion of Ontario Highway 401, known as the Toronto Bypass, just to the south connected the district to the rest of the Toronto area by freeway. The area was filled in by the 1960s with residential single-family subdivisions. By the mid-1970s, some high rise development was occurring, such as a Canadian Government Building at Yonge and Elmhurst Street and the twin-tower Sheppard Centre commercial and office complex at Yonge and Sheppard. The 1970s also saw the extension of the Yonge–University line to Finch, connecting the area to downtown Toronto.

Following the opening of the subway extension, the area along Yonge Street, between Sheppard and Finch Avenues, was chosen by North York and Metropolitan Toronto to be developed into a central business district as the borough (which developed from a rural township and thus had no true historic downtown save for the original small Willowdale village where the city centre developed) was promoted to the status of city. An official plan by Metropolitan Toronto encouraged high-density commercial and residential developments in the area. The former City of North York chose to encourage the development of the area as a downtown by building a civic centre complex consisting of its civic offices, a public square, a central library, an arts centre, and an aquatic centre on the west side of Yonge, about 600 metres north of Sheppard at southwest corner of Park Home Avenue and Yonge.

Following the completion of the Scarborough RT, the City of North York convinced the Toronto Transit Commission to construct North York Centre station, an infill station on the Yonge–University line, to connect the new North York Civic Centre complex directly to the subway, which opened in 1987. On the east side of Yonge Street across from the Civic Centre, the Empress Walk mixed-use development, consisting of a shopping mall, cinema, and two condominium towers, was completed in 1997–2000. The streets sidewalks were widened and landscaped. The area's growth has continued steadily since then. The new Sheppard subway line opened in 2002, running along Sheppard Avenue from Don Mills Road in the east, to the expanded Sheppard-Yonge Station which crossroads with the Yonge-University line. The Sheppard Centre, originally built in the 1970s, had a cinema added in the late 1990s, then it was extensively renovated from 2016 to 2021.

A Toronto Police Service Interceptor Sedan races through the Sheppard-Yonge intersection in 2014.

Canada's deadliest vehicle-ramming attack occurred on April 23, 2018, when a rented van collided with numerous pedestrians, killing 10 and injuring 16 others on Yonge Street between Finch and Sheppard Avenues. One became quadriplegic and permanently required a ventilator at an assisted-living facility where she died in November 2021.

== Landmarks ==
The North York Civic Centre office complex and Mel Lastman Square, on the west side of Yonge Street, are central to the area. Across Yonge Street to the east is Empress Walk, a shopping mall that connects directly to the local subway station. North York Central Library, the Toronto Centre for the Arts, and the Toronto District School Board headquarters are all located adjacent to the square. The Joseph Shepard Building, a federal government office, is located on the west side of Yonge Street one block north of Sheppard Avenue. Further north and south along Yonge Street, office towers, condominium apartment towers and street-level shops line the street.

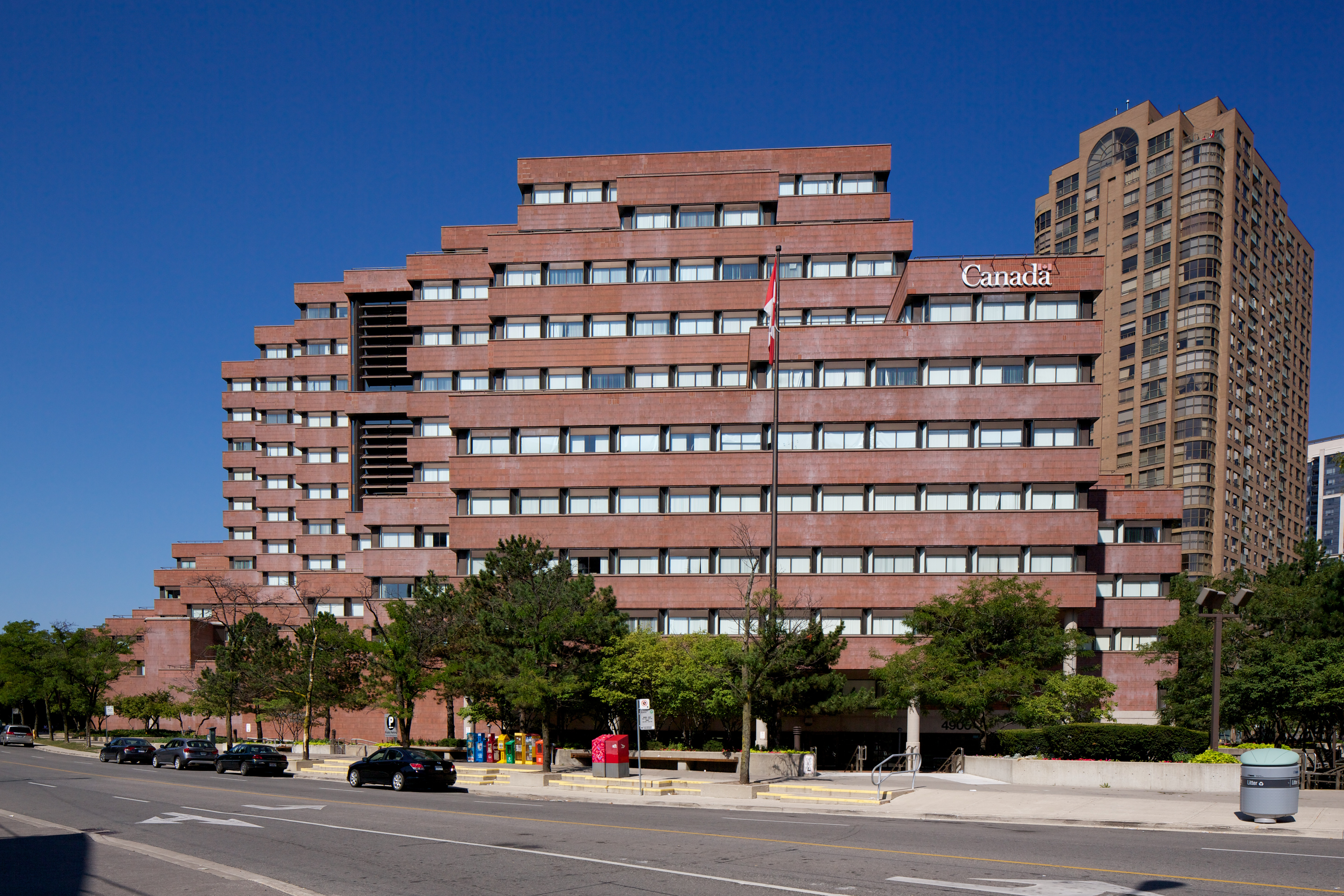
The Joseph Shepard Building, a federal government office.

Gibson House, a museum converted from a mid-19th-century house built by the Canadian politician David Gibson, a Scottish immigrant, land surveyor and participant of the Rebellion of 1837, is also located in this neighbourhood. Earl Haig Secondary School is located on Princess Avenue nearby.

The district is directly served by the North York Centre subway station, while Sheppard–Yonge and Finch subway stations are located at the southern and northern edges of the area, respectively. Finch station is a hub for GO Transit services for commuters from north of Toronto. The area is known for the high-level of traffic on the six lanes of Yonge Street, which connects to the Ontario Highway 401 south of Sheppard.
