= Macy DuBois =

Canadian architect (1929-2007)

- Born: 20 December 1929; Baltimore, Maryland
- Died: 9 November 2007 (aged 77); Toronto, Ontario
- Education: Tufts University (BSc 1951); Harvard University (MArch 1958)
- Spouse: Sarah Buchanan (m. 1957)

Gazell Macy DuBois M. Arch, P. Eng, PP-FRAIC, PP-RCA, FAIA (hon) (20 December 1929 – 9 November 2007) was an American-Canadian architect who designed several landmark Toronto buildings.

== Early life ==
Born in Baltimore, Maryland, DuBois earned a Bachelor of Science in Engineering (cum laude) at Tufts University in 1951, and served in Europe and Asia with the U.S. Navy from 1951–54. DuBois retired as Lieutenant, Junior Grade and commander of the minesweeper USS Kite with the Korea Service Star and United Nations Battle Star.

== Career ==
Uncertain about a career in engineering, DuBois attended an American Institute of Architects (AIA) conference in Boston, and was inspired to attend the Harvard Graduate School of Design, graduating in 1958. In his final year, he entered the Toronto City Hall design competition with three other student collaborators. Selected as one of 8 semi-finalists from a field of 510 entrants, he moved to Toronto to work on the second round and, although his design was not ultimately selected, soon relocated permanently.

DuBois worked briefly for John B. Parkin and Associates (1958–59), then joined Robert Fairfield Associates in 1960, which was renamed Fairfield+DuBois when he became a partner in 1962. The firm went through several name changes as partners joined and left, finally becoming The DuBois Plumb Partnership after partnering with Helga Plumb in 1979 until their retirement in 2001.

His first major project, begun in 1959, was the combined residence and teaching facility of New College, University of Toronto, with a curved interior courtyard inside a rectilinear facade. It was well received, winning a local architectural design award after completion of phase II, and is considered one of the finest buildings on the campus.

Having been told soon after arriving in Toronto that exposed concrete "just won't work because of our climate", DuBois determined to prove otherwise in his second significant project, the Central Technical School Arts Centre. Occupied in 1963, it was an internationally recognized success, establishing his reputation designing academic buildings.

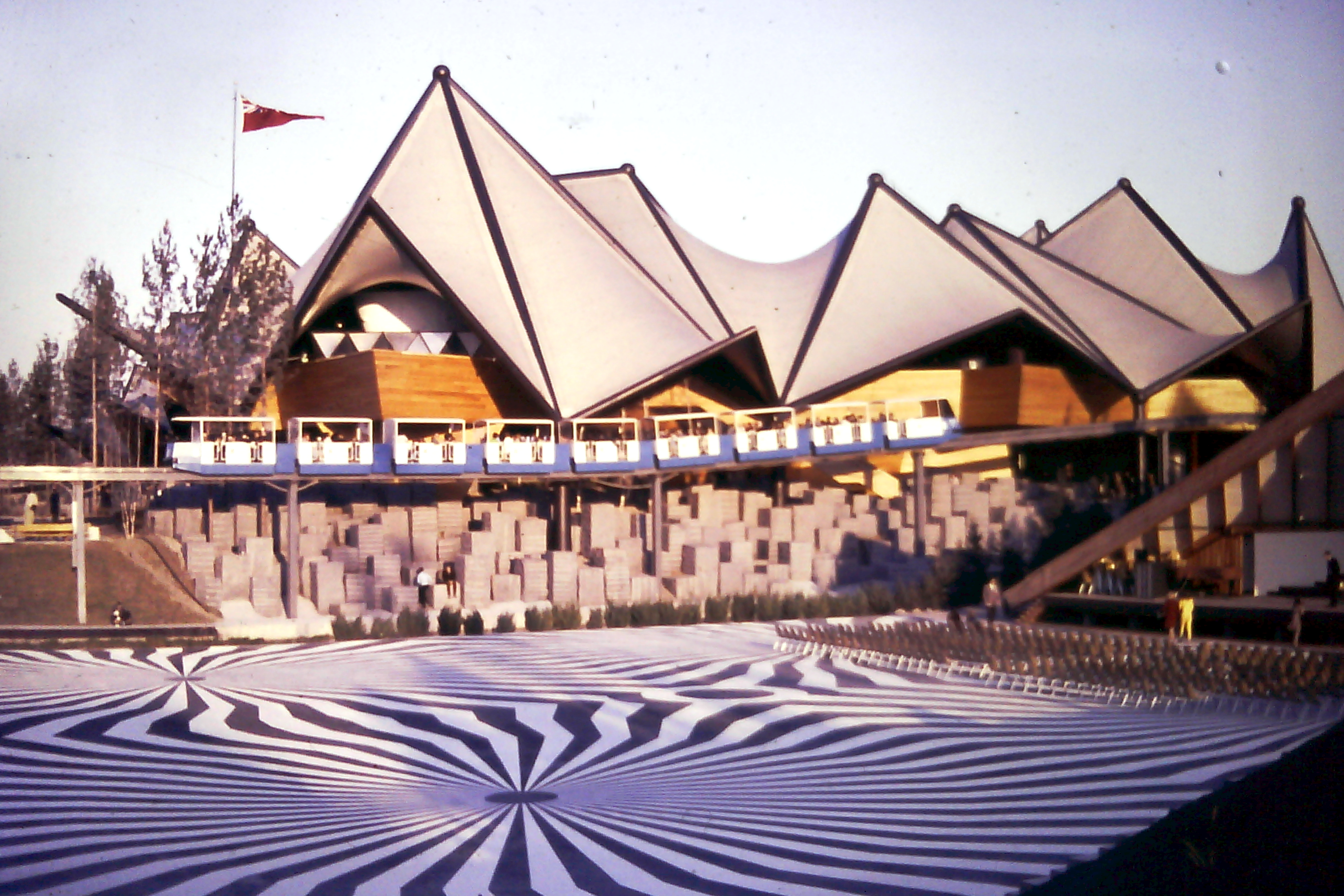
The Expo 67 Ontario pavilion

Probably his most-photographed building was the Ontario pavilion at Expo 67, an irregular tent-like structure made of computer-designed fabric stretched across a steel framework. A little too imaginative for some, who claimed the model "looks vaguely like a bat strangling under a white sheet" or "a model of a sort of tent city or a mess of paper triangles or mentally disarranged envelopes", it was greatly admired by almost everyone who actually saw it. Dubois wanted a natural landscaping for the pavilion and worked with landscape architect Dick Strong on a design featuring massive granite blocks, of differing size.

DuBois went on to design many institutional buildings, including a large portion of Lakehead University, and win numerous awards. Generally in the modern style, he tempered the brutalism of Le Corbusier, with inspiration from Alvar Aalto, Louis Kahn and Frank Lloyd Wright. To these influences, he personally added sensitivity to the application and environment, building on a human scale, and the use of interior spaces that are useful year-round.

His only significant residential project, The Oaklands condominium and townhouse development in Toronto, is an excellent example. Earning a Governor General's Award in 1983, the citation credited "Scale with surroundings well conceived; calm of the complex's interior street; considerable value obtained with limited budget.

As his career matured, DuBois contributed a great deal of time to foster the profession of architecture. His energetic service to the Royal Architectural Institute of Canada earned him the presidency of the society from 1982–83, and he also served as president of the Royal Canadian Academy of Arts from 1988–91.

His last public appearance was at the launch of the book Concrete Toronto on November 1, 2007, only a few days before his unexpected death.

== Major awards ==
DuBois received numerous honours and awards for his work, the most notable being:

- Massey Medal (1964) for Central Technical School Arts Centre.
- Massey Medal (1967) for ECE Group Office building, Don Mills
- Low Energy Building Design Award of Excellence (1980), for the Joseph Shepard Building
- Governor General's Medal in Architecture (1983), for The Oaklands Condominium and Housing Project.

== Projects ==
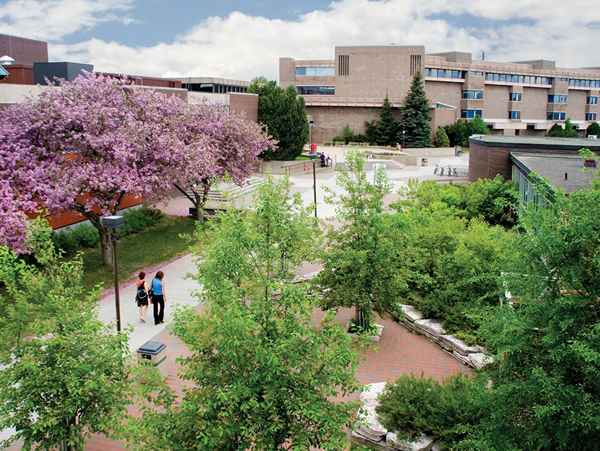
Lakehead University Academic Building (upper right)

Prominent buildings designed by Macy DuBois include:

- New College, University of Toronto, Toronto (1962, 1967)
- Ontario Pavilion at Expo 67, Montreal (1967)
- Lakehead University, Thunder Bay (1969, 1973):
  - 20 year master plan
  - Academic building
  - Athletic complex
  - Sciences building
- Albert Campbell Library, Toronto (1971)
- Trent University Otonabee College, Student Union, Academic Building, and Student Residences Peterborough (1973)
- George Brown College of Applied Arts & Technology, Casa Loma Campus, Toronto (1974)
- Ontario Police College, Aylmer, Ontario: Master Plan and Teaching, Living, Dining, Athletic and Training Facilities (1976)
- Joseph Shepard Federal Office Building, Toronto (1977) (Federal Heritage Building)
- The Oaklands Condominium and Housing Project, Toronto (1980)
- Ambulance Services Headquarters, Toronto (1981, 1995)
- Canadian Embassy Complex, Beijing, China (1989, 2000)
- Windsor Justice Facility, Windsor, Ontario (2000)
