= Government of Canada Building (North York) =

Canadian government building in North York, Toronto

Joseph Shepard Building
- Édifice Joseph-Shepard
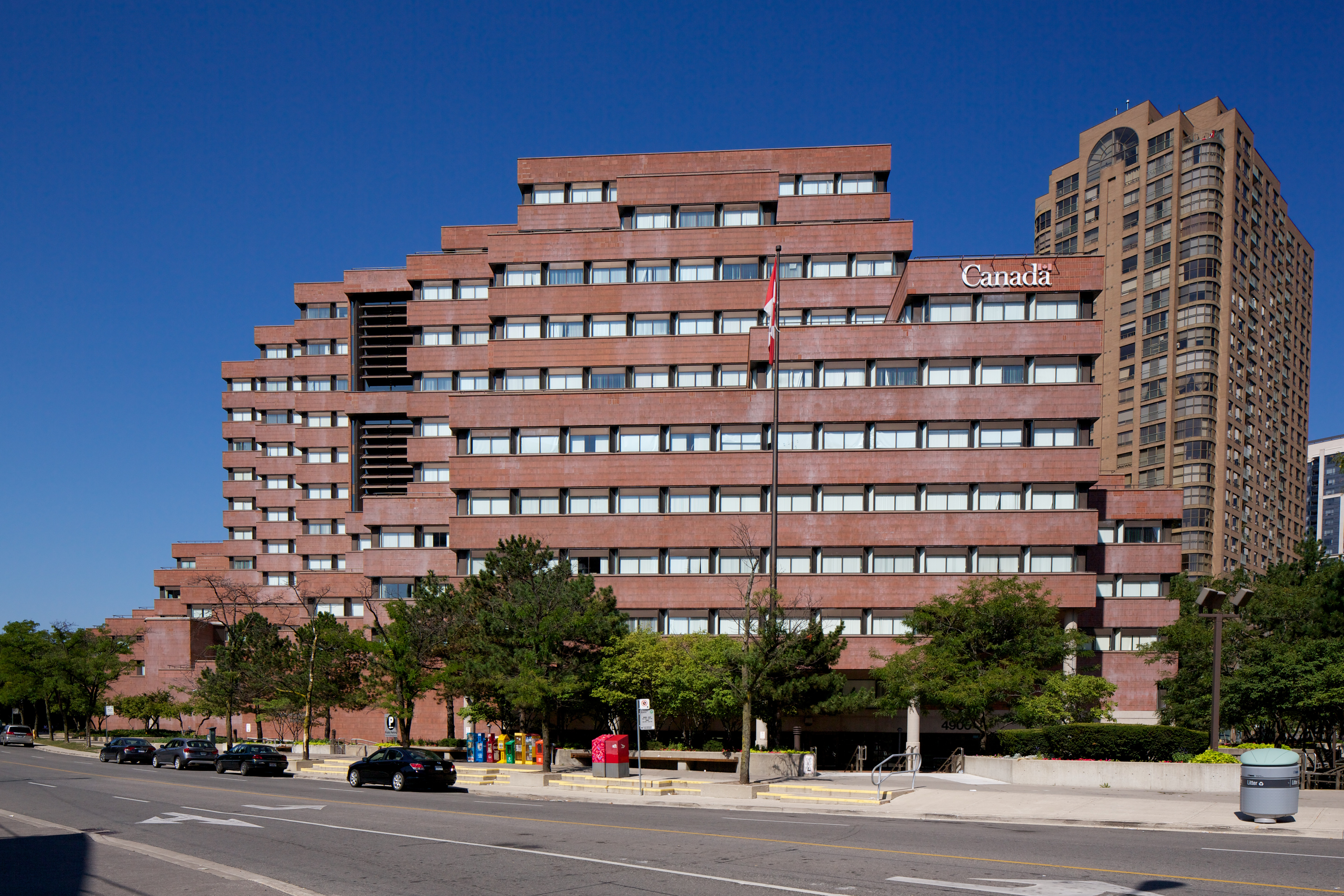
- Building exterior in 2012
- Alternative names: Government of Canada Building

General information
- Type: Office building
- Architectural style: Modernist
- Location: 4900 Yonge Street; Toronto, Ontario; M2N 6A8
- Coordinates: 43.763315°N 79.413042°W
- Construction started: 1975
- Completed: 1977
- Owner: Government of Canada

Design and construction
- Architect: Macy DuBois

Other information
- Public transit: Sheppard–Yonge,

The Joseph Shepard Building (French: Édifice Joseph-Shepard), also known as the Joseph Shepard Federal Building, Government of Canada Building, or simply 4900 Yonge, is an office complex used by the federal government of Canada in Toronto, Ontario, Canada. Located on Yonge Street in the North York neighbourhood of Lansing, the building lies within North York City Centre.

Built in 1977 as a medium-sized, planned consolidation project to service residents of the former Metropolitan Toronto districts of North York and Etobicoke, the building houses offices for passport services, Service Canada, Employment and Social Development Canada, Immigration, Refugees and Citizenship Canada, Shared Services Canada and Canadian Forces recruiting centre in addition to other federal departments. The building was designed by Macy DuBois and is a Classified Federal Heritage Building. The building is named for Joseph Shepard, an early settler in North York whom acquired 400 acres (160 ha) of land nearby and also the namesake of Sheppard Avenue.

The structure, with its multi-layered design, stands out among the surrounding skyscrapers along Yonge Street, which were built during the office boom of the 1990s surrounding the diversification of North York City Centre. The building is within walking distance to Sheppard–Yonge subway station and short distance from Ontario Highway 401.

The building is one of two buildings used by the federal government in North York, the other being the Environment and Climate Change Canada Building near York University Heights. Other federal facilities in Toronto include the Dominion Public Building, the Canada Centre Building, and the Health Canada Building; the latter two buildings located in the former city of Scarborough.

== Stabbing ==
On March 14, 2016, two members of the Canadian Forces recruiting centre were stabbed by someone carrying a knife.
