= North York Centre station =

Toronto subway station

North York Centre
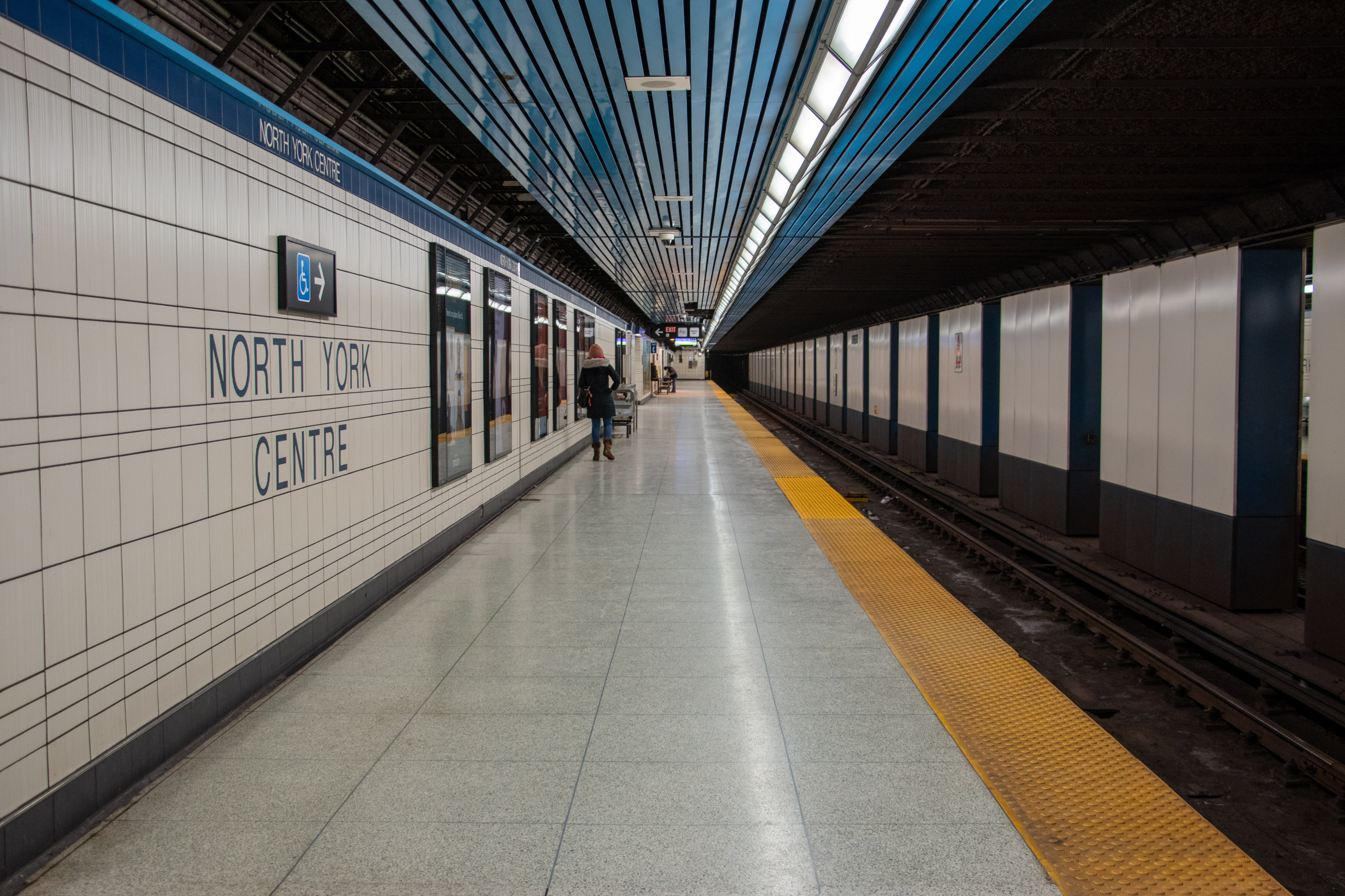

General information
- Location: 5102 Yonge Street; Toronto, Ontario; Canada
- Coordinates: 43°46′07″N 79°24′45″W
- Platforms: Side platforms
- Tracks: 2
- Connections: TTC buses: 97 Yonge; 320 Yonge

Construction
- Structure type: Underground
- Accessible: Yes

Other information
- Website: Official station page

History
- Opened: June 18, 1987; 39 years ago

Passengers
- 2023–2024: 16,699
- Rank: 44 of 70

Services
Preceding station	Toronto Transit Commission	Following station
Sheppard–Yonge towards Vaughan	Line 1 Yonge–University	Finch Terminus
Location

North York Centre is a subway station on Line 1 Yonge–University of the Toronto subway system. The station is located under Yonge Street, where it is intersected by Park Home Avenue and Empress Avenue. The station, the system's first and only infill station, opened in 1987 to serve North York City Centre, a high density business district in the Willowdale neighbourhood.

== History ==
The station was initially proposed as part of the Yonge subway extension, which extended the Yonge line to Finch. At the time, it was called Park Home station. However, it and a proposal to rough in the station were rejected at the time.

North York Centre opened in 1987 in what was then the City of North York as an infill station of the Yonge–University line.

This station was added by excavating alongside the existing tracks, on a level section of route provided for this purpose when the line was built. The view across the tracks between platforms is not as open as most stations, as the solid concrete wall had to retain its load-bearing strength, and smaller openings were cut.

In late 2007 the TTC began work to make the station accessible to those with limited mobility, and in November 2009 the work was completed. Two elevators were installed to take passengers from mezzanine level to the subway platforms. Persons in wheelchairs or with other mobility restrictions are now able to enter from street level by way of existing facilities in the major buildings on both sides of the station.

== Public art ==
Artwork in the station consists of North York Heritage Murals by North York artists Nicholas and Susana Graven, located at the platform level. The two murals, each made of over 5000 pieces of glazed ceramic tiles using a process invented by Artessa Studios of North York, depict scenes of North York in the 19th century in an abstract way and are titled:

- Top of the North Hill—1850s on the northbound platform (surtitled with the historic place names "Don Mills, Flynntown, L'Amoreaux, Lansing, Milneford, Newtonbrook, Oriole, O'Sullivan's Corners, Willowdale"), and
- Traffic at Yonge and Sheppard—1860s on the southbound platform (surtitled with the historic place names "Downsview, Dublin, Eglinton, Elia, Emery, Fairbank, Fisherville, Humber Summit, Kaiserville, York Mills, Weston").

The historic place names shown above each of the murals are names of historic communities near an imaginary line from the northwest to the southeast through the historic Lansing.

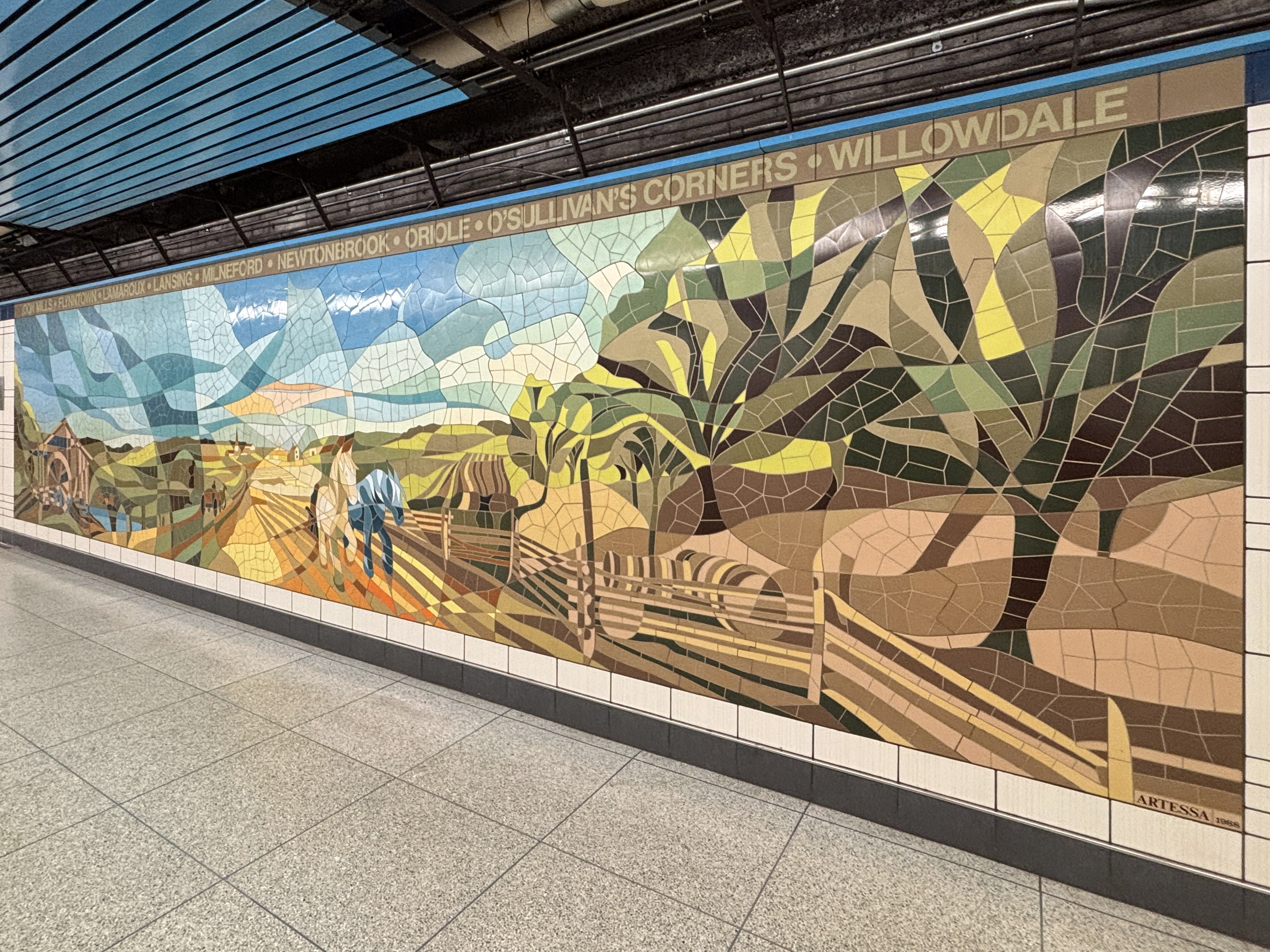
Top of the North Hill—1850s

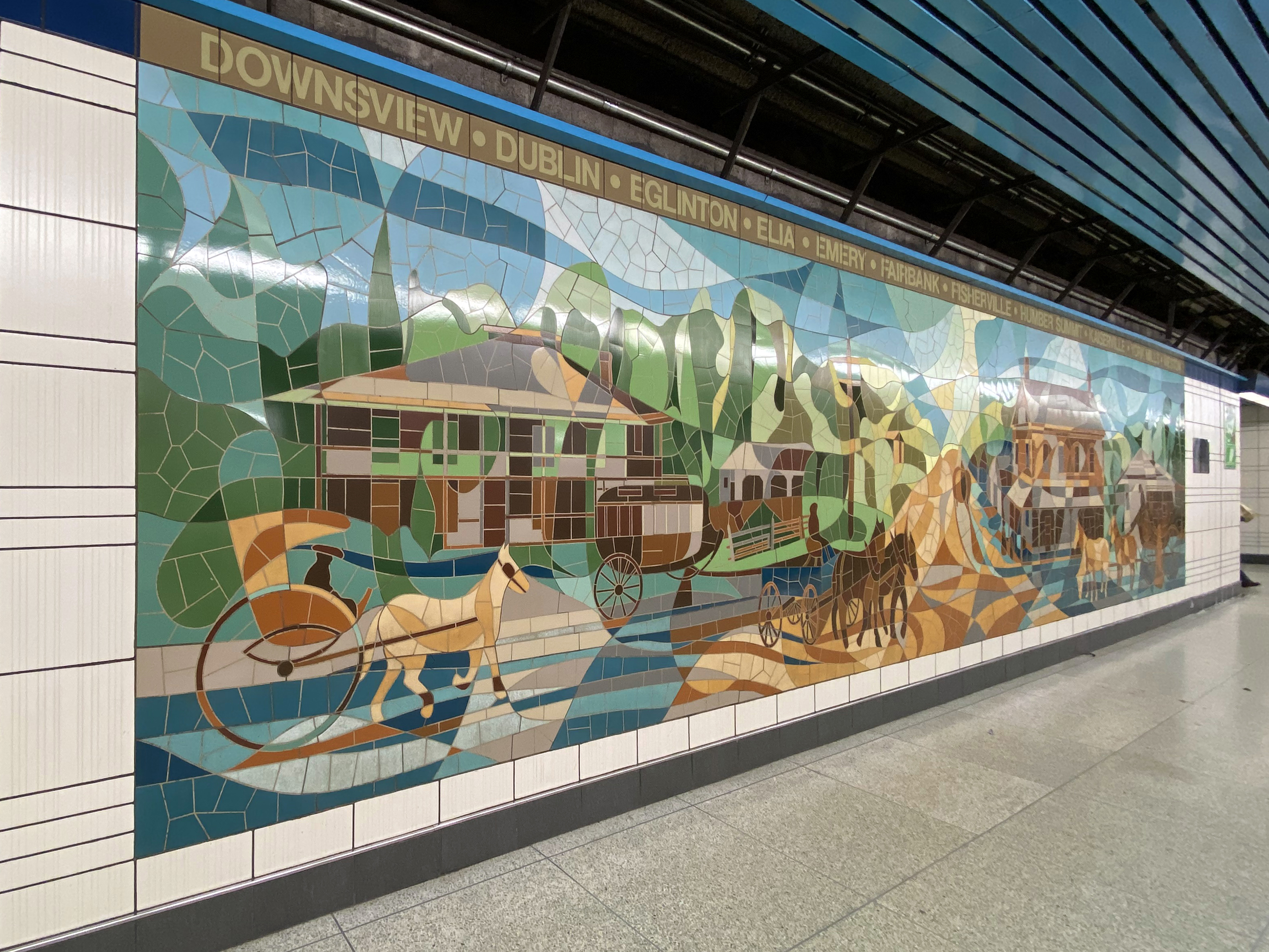
Traffic at Yonge and Sheppard—1860s

== Nearby landmarks ==
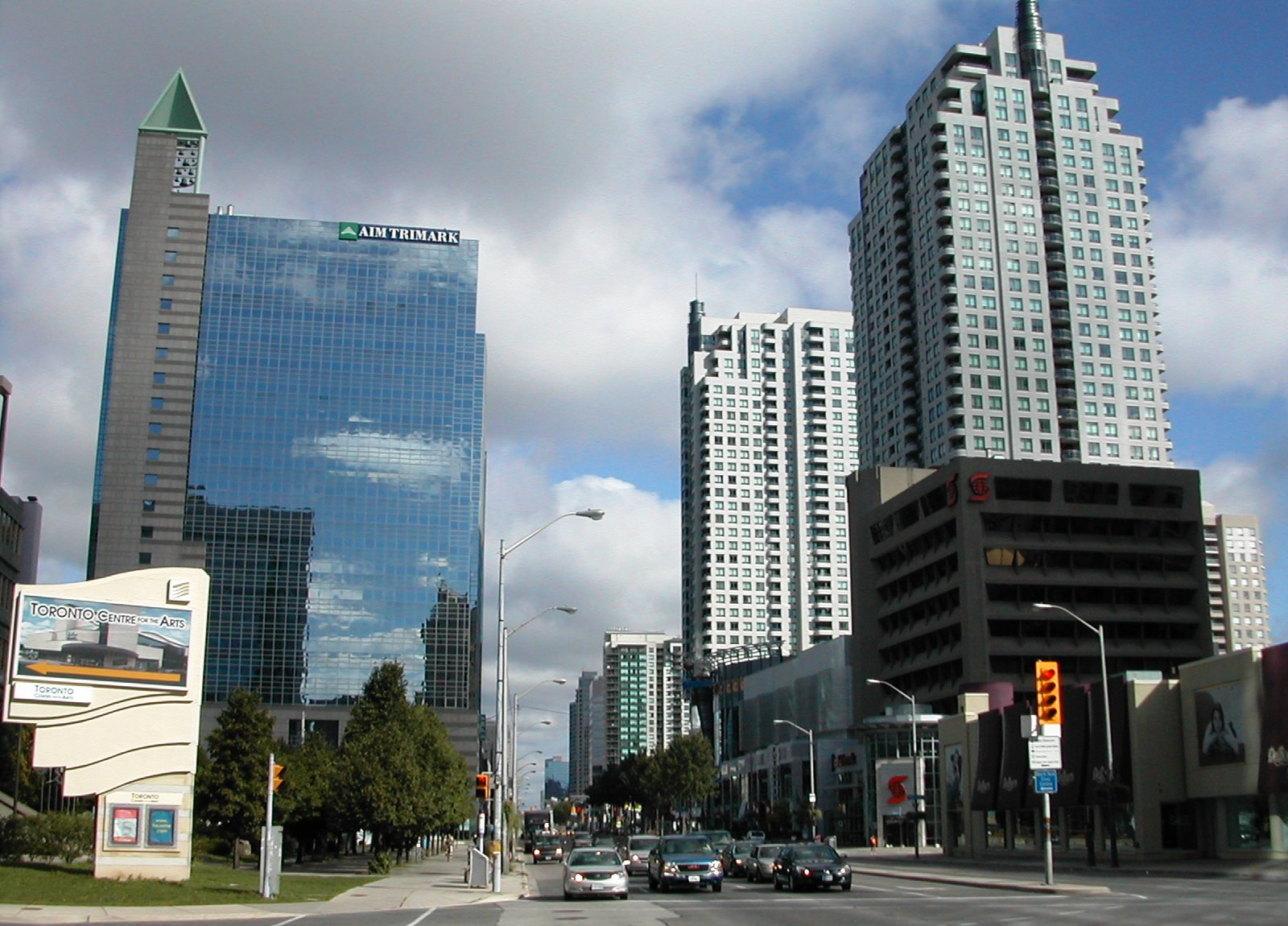
Yonge Street in 2005, looking north toward the Empress Ave intersection

Direct underground level connection from the station are: on the east side with the Empress Walk shopping, entertainment and residential complex; and on the west side with City Centre, which includes commercial office and retail space as well as a cluster of City of Toronto facilities that include Mel Lastman Square, North York Civic Centre, North York Central Library and Douglas Snow Aquatic Centre. Other nearby landmarks include Earl Haig Secondary School, Gibson House, Meridian Arts Centre and York Cemetery.

== Surface connections ==
TTC routes serving the station include:

Route	Name	Additional information
97A	Yonge	Northbound to Steeles Avenue and southbound to St. Clair station; (On-street stop outside station)
97B	Yonge	Northbound to Steeles Avenue via Yonge Boulevard and southbound to St. Clair station via Yonge Boulevard; (On-street stop outside station)
320	Yonge	Blue Night Service; northbound to Steeles Avenue and southbound to Queens Quay; (On-street stop outside station)
