= North York Civic Centre =

Municipal building in Ontario, Canada

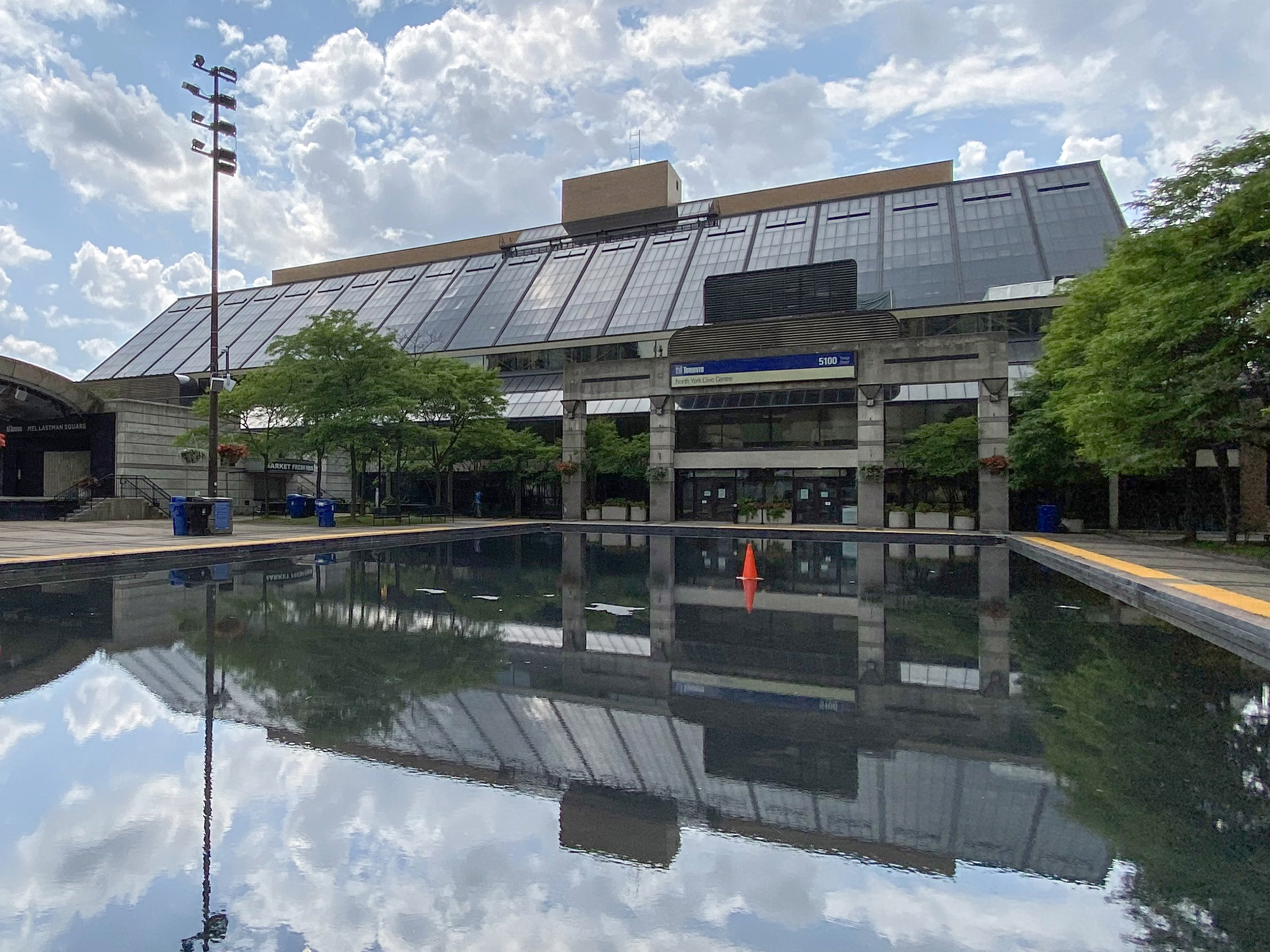
- Interactive map of the North York Civic Centre area

General information
- Location: 5100 Yonge Street; Toronto, Ontario; M2N 5V7
- Coordinates: 43.767315°N 79.414641°W
- Construction started: 1975
- Completed: 1979
- Inaugurated: 1979
- Owner: City of Toronto

Technical details
- Floor count: 7

Design and construction
- Architect: Adamson Architects
- Awards and prizes: Governor General's Medal for Architecture 1982

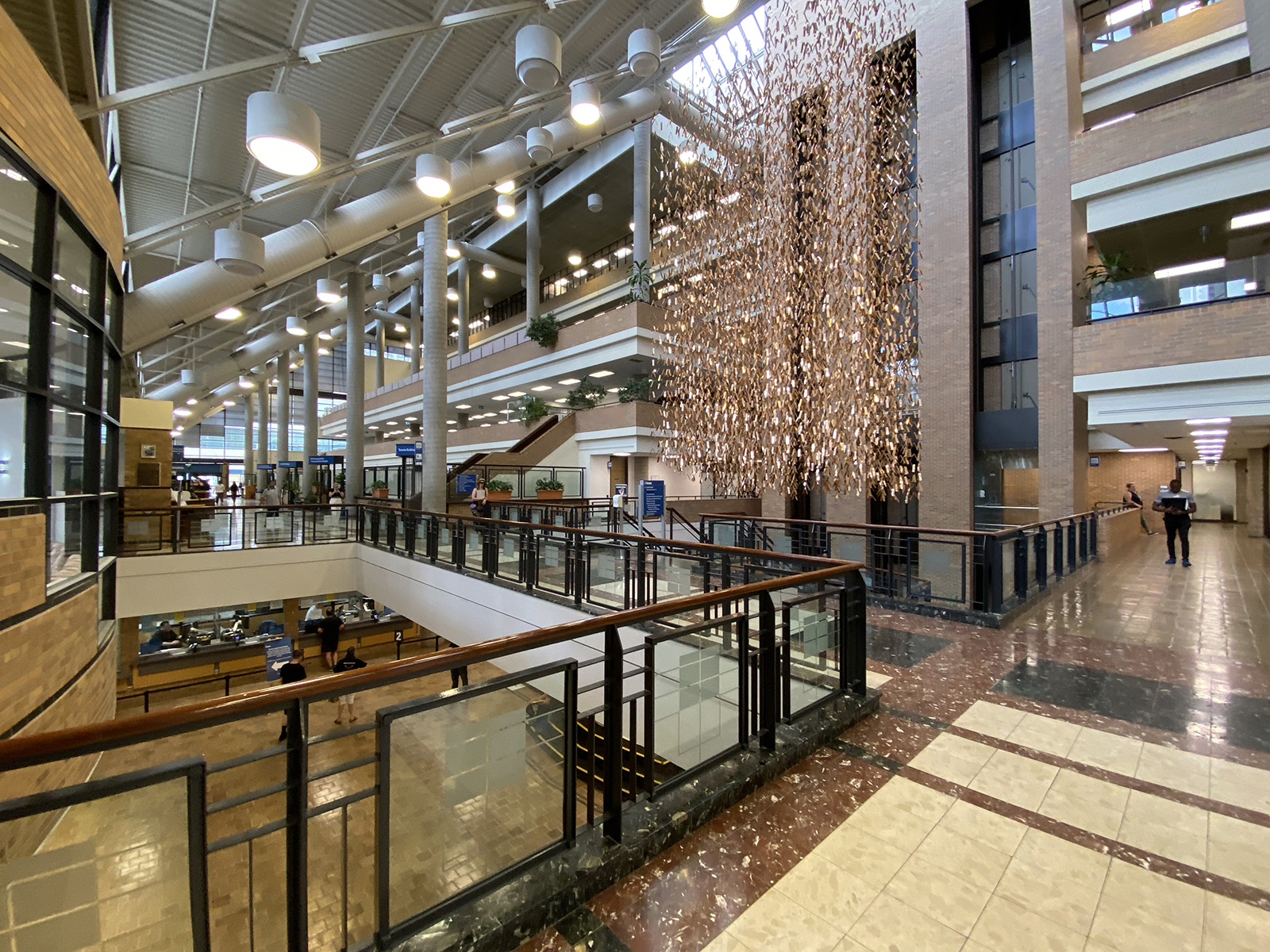
North York Civic Centre interior

The North York Civic Centre is a municipal government building in Toronto, Ontario, Canada. It opened in 1979 as the city hall of the former city of North York. It is located in North York City Centre.

Designed by Adamson Associates Architects, the building is located on Yonge Street north of Sheppard Avenue, and features Mel Lastman Square along the Yonge Street frontage. The construction of the building was intended to act as a catalyst for the development of the "North York City Centre", a downtown area for the formerly suburban North York. The building received The Governor General's Medal for Architecture in 1982.

With municipal amalgamation, North York is now part of the City of Toronto, and the building no longer serves as a city hall. Today, the building is home to the North York Community Council and a number of local municipal departments and services. Opposite the Civic Centre is the North York Central Library branch of the Toronto Public Library.

The Civic Centre is served by the Toronto Transit Commission's North York Centre subway station (opened in 1987).

== Previous Municipal Offices ==
- Temporary home for council meetings at Brown (Willowdale) School and Golden Lion Hotel 1922
- 1st North York Township Office 5145 Yonge Street (at Empress Avenue) 1923–1956; 2 storey American colonial building was built by Murray Brown with additions added in the 1940s; re-purposed as courthouse and other civic uses, partially demolished in 1989 (partial facade rebuilt in Empress Walk
- North York Township/Borough Office 5000 Yonge Street Burnett Avenue 1956–1975; 3 storey building was built by Sproatt & Rolph and awarded the Massey Medal for Architecture in 1958; site sold in 1975 and later as site of North York Performing Arts Centre

== See also ==
- East York Civic Centre
- Etobicoke Civic Centre
- Scarborough Civic Centre
- York Civic Centre
- Metro Hall
- Toronto City Hall

Preceded by N/A	North York City Hall; 1970s–1997	Succeeded by Toronto City Hall
