= North York Central Library =

Public library in Toronto, Canada

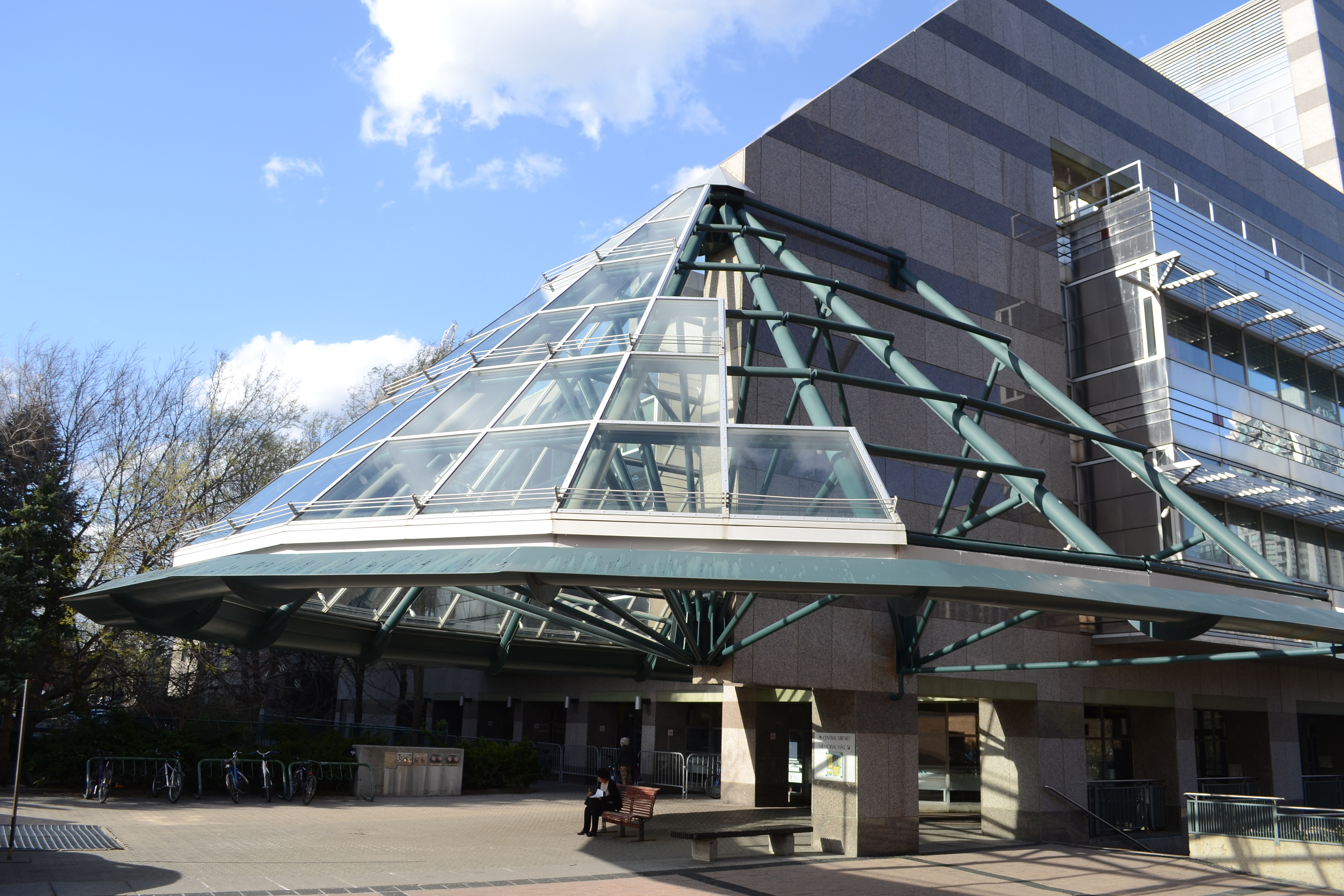
- Entrance to North York Central Library in 2012
- 43.7680°N 79.4148°W
- Location: 5120 Yonge Street; Toronto, Ontario; M2N 5N9, Canada
- Type: Public research library
- Branch of: Toronto Public Library

Collection
- Items collected: Books, business directories, CDs, e-books, genealogical archives, maps, music, periodicals

Other information
- Website: www.torontopubliclibrary.ca/northyorkcentral/

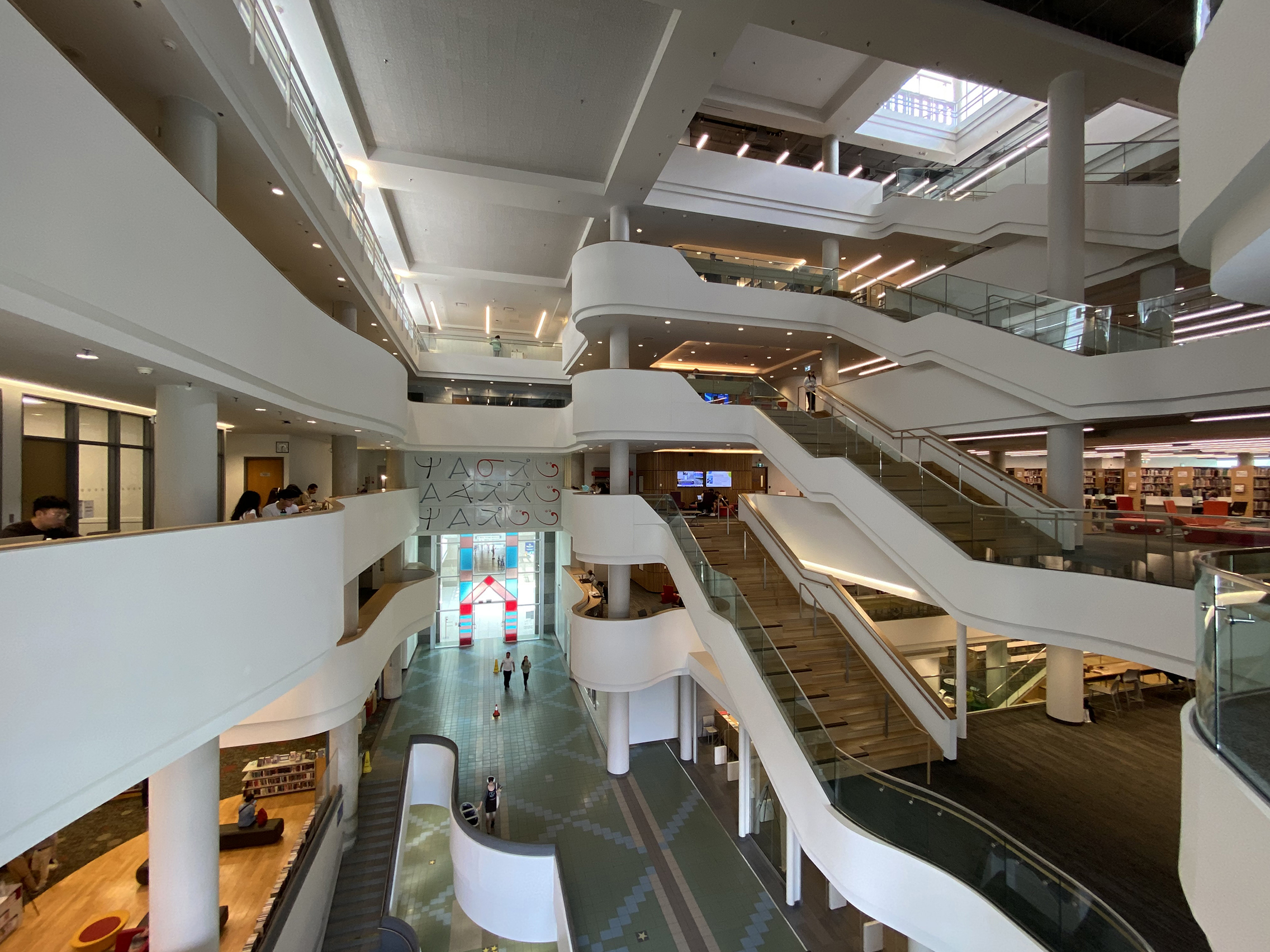
Interior of North York Central Library after the renovation

North York Central Library is a Toronto Public Library branch located in North York City Centre, Toronto, Ontario, Canada. It is one of the two libraries in the Toronto public library system considered to be "Research and Reference Libraries", the other being the Toronto Reference Library in the city's downtown core. In contrast to the Toronto Reference Library, however, most of the items in the North York Central Library can be signed out.

The library is located inside the North York Centre twin-tower office/hotel/retail complex (5150 Yonge Street), known as North York City Centre. 5150 Yonge Street is on the west side of Yonge Street (across the street from Empress Walk) and forms the north side of Mel Lastman Square. The library is adjacent to North York Civic Centre, which, until 1998, was North York's City Hall. It is served by the North York Centre subway station, which has a direct underground connection to the mall containing the library. The library cost $20 million to construct, along with $250 million to construct the rest of the North York City Centre complex (mall, office, hotel)

In 2016, the library underwent a major renovation. The library reopened in 2018.

== Services ==
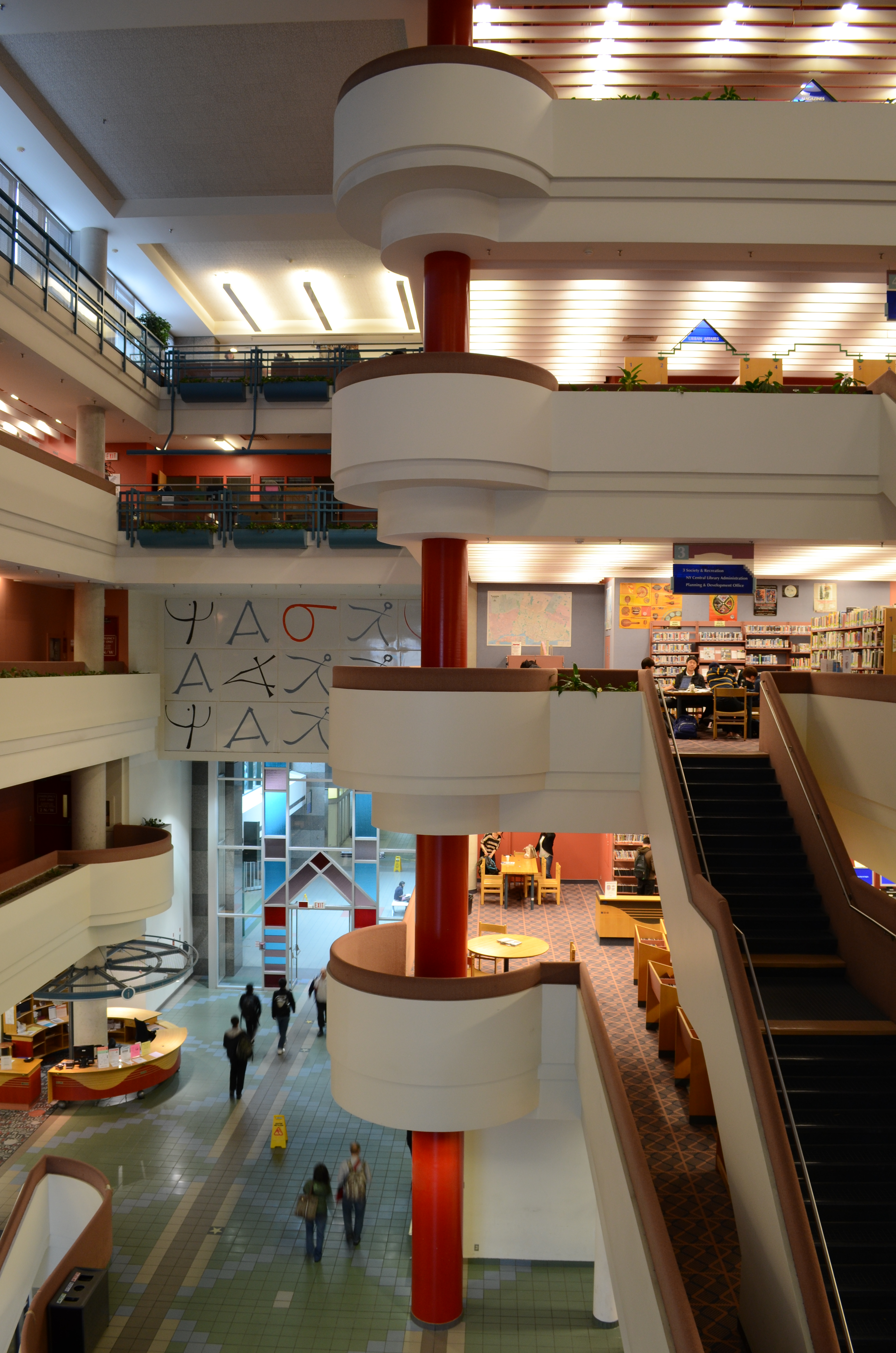
Inside view of the North York Central Library, prior to 2016-18 renovation.

North York Central Library has an auditorium, two large meeting rooms, and four quiet study rooms. These spaces may be booked over the phone. Also available are 16 study rooms designated for individual study.

The library also provides accessibility equipment, including a Braille writer, computers loaded with Kurzweil 1000 and 3000 software, magnifiers, and wheelchair accessible furniture.

North York Central Library also provides internet access to patrons through the public computer terminals and free Wi-Fi in the building. There are 115 workstations in the library, 13 of which are in the Computer Learning Centre. Printing and scanning are also available to patrons. North York Central Library also has a microfilm/microfiche reader and printing machine.

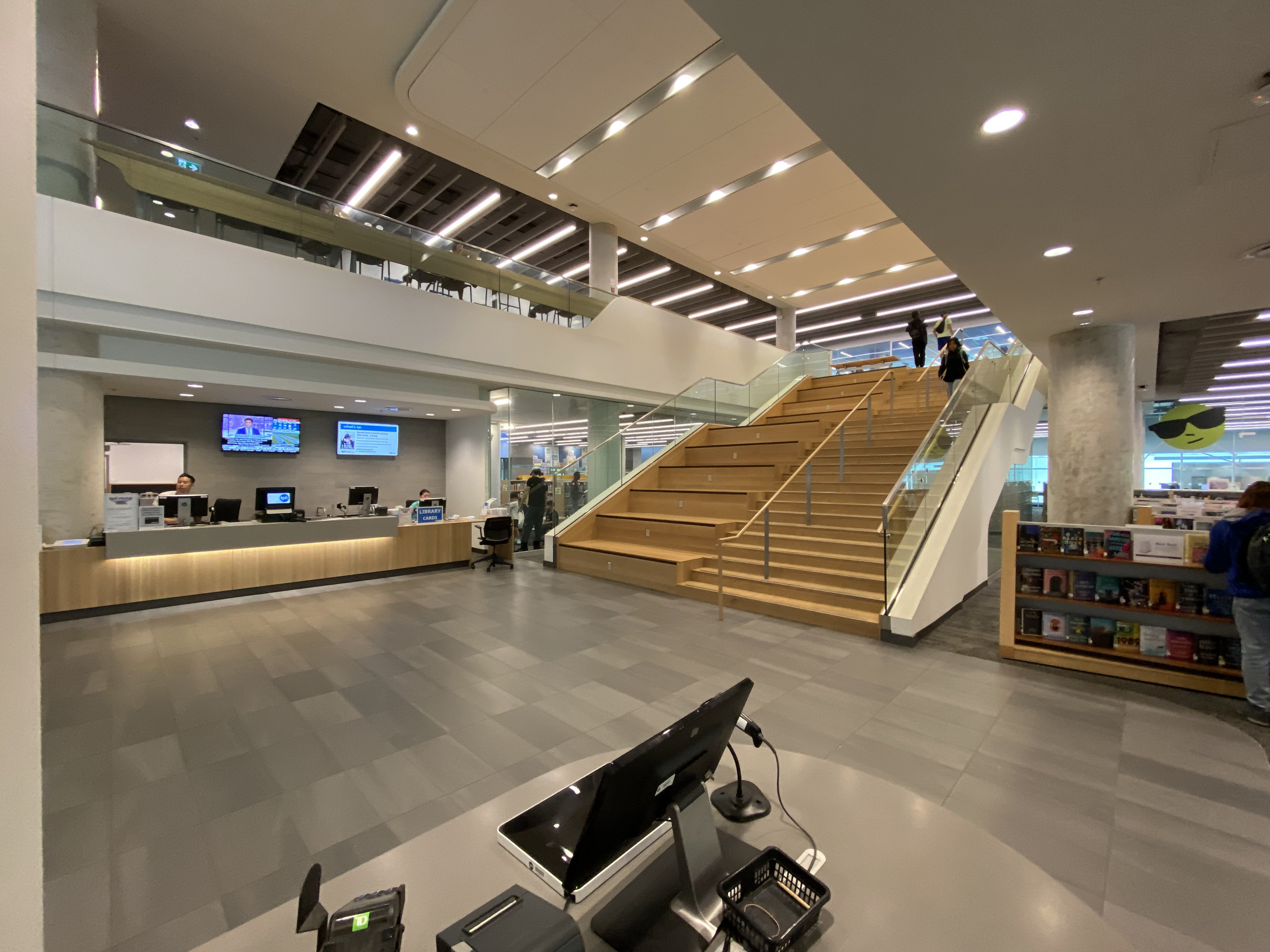
Level 1 stairs seating

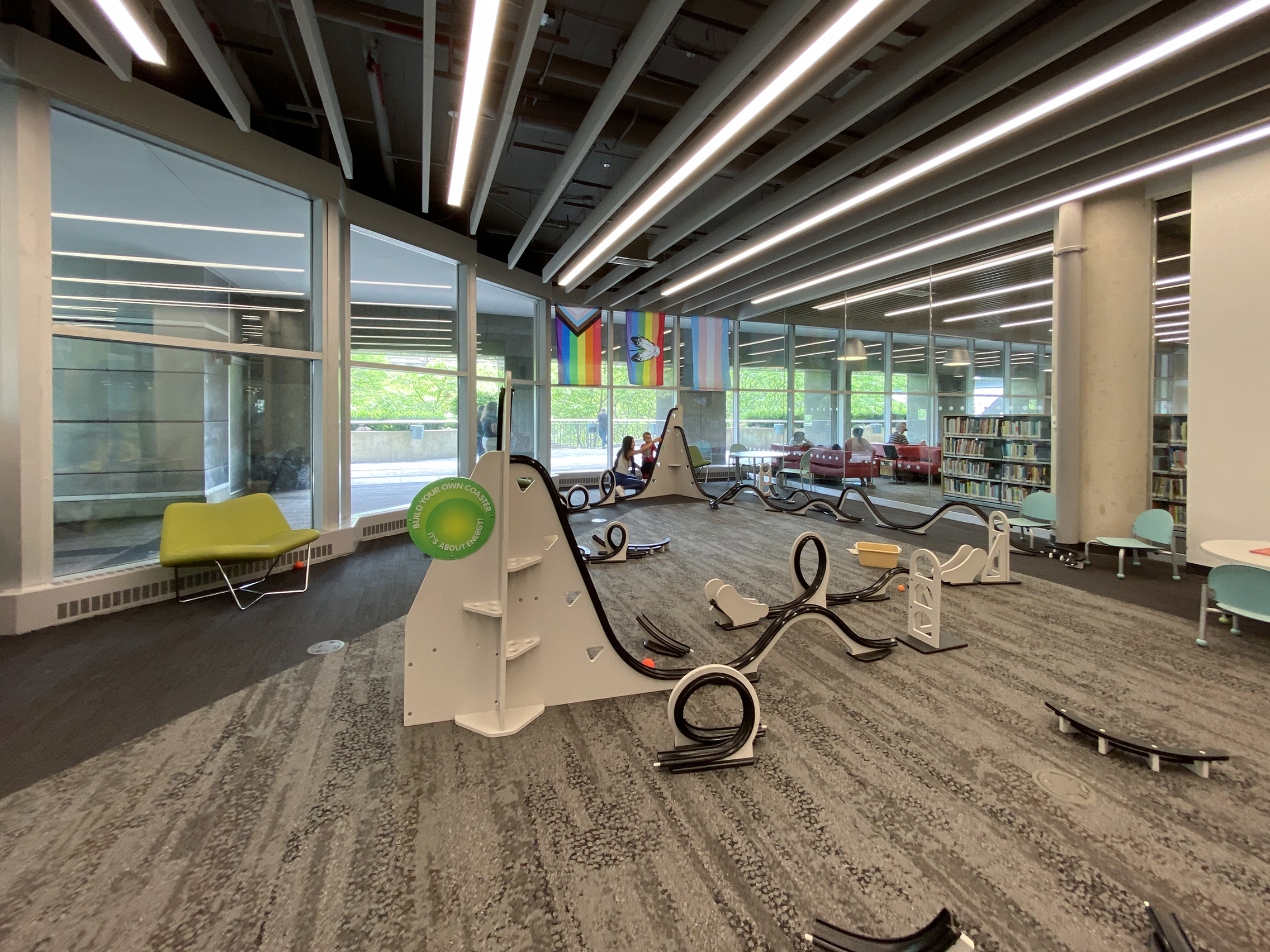
Level 1 Children Library Play Area

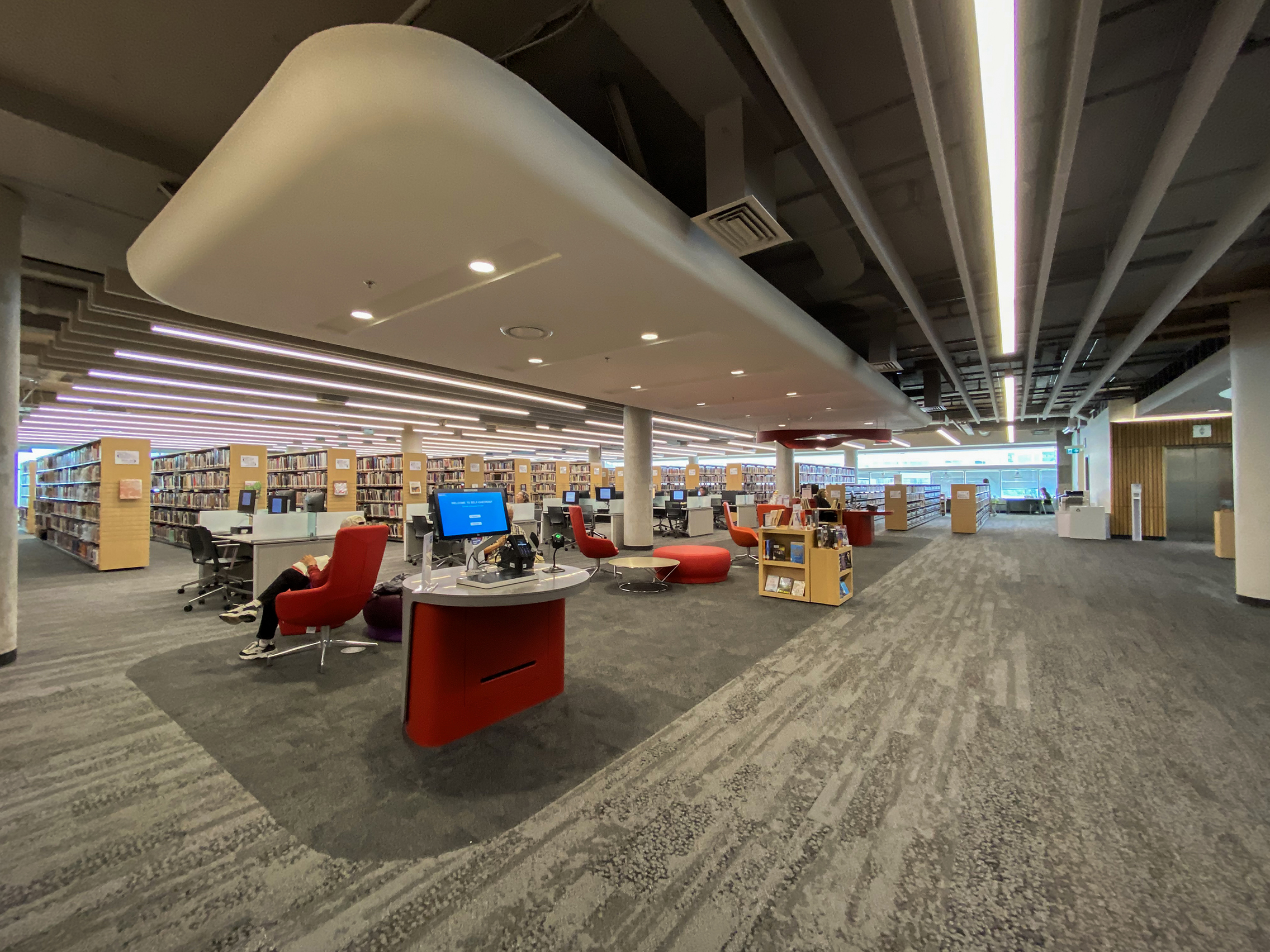
Level 3

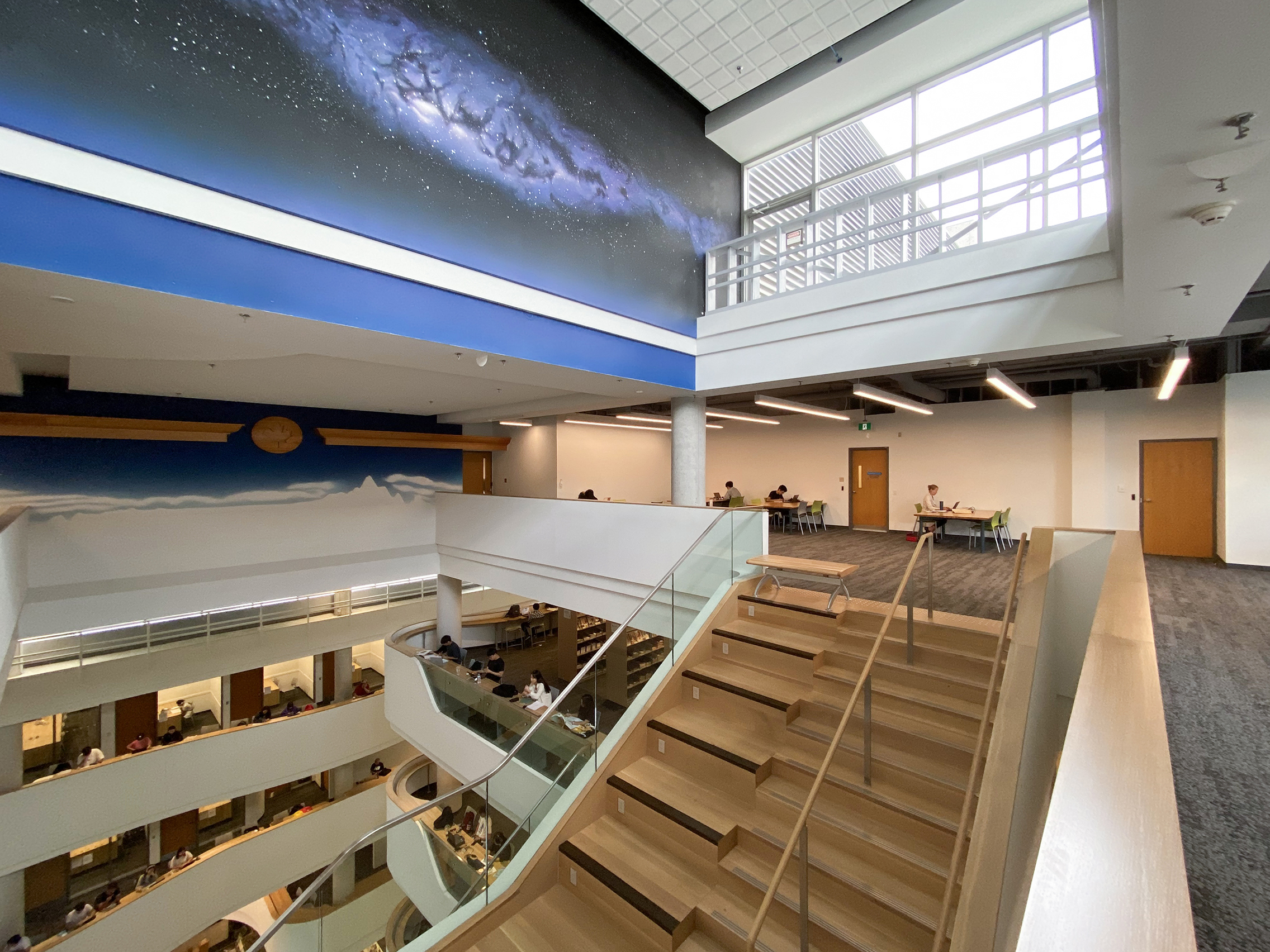
Level 5

== Collection ==
In addition to the books, magazines, newspapers, DVDs, and CDs available at the branch, North York Central Library also offers its own unique selections. Its historical collections feature items related to genealogy, Native peoples, North York history, and local Ontario history. The library has materials tailored towards children, like the Children's Literature Resource Collection and the IBBY collection for Young People with Disabilities. There are also other collections for older patrons, like adult literacy works, audiobooks, and large print books.

There is, as well, a variety of multilingual collections for children and adults (in languages including Chinese, Russian, and many others) available to serve North York's ethnically diverse population.

== History ==
Now part of the larger Toronto Public Library system, the first stand-alone facility for the North York Public Library was constructed on Yonge Street at Park Home Avenue in 1959, replacing the Memorial Community Hall Library, which was opened in 1950. The Gladys Allison Building (named after the first chair of the Library Board Gladys Allison (1901-1979)) acted as a central library for all of North York. It served as the library until its closure on October 5, 1985, as a new branch was being built to replace it. A support branch, Central-on-Sheppard, opened to serve the community during the transition period between the closure and the opening of the new central library.

The new North York Central Library, along with the North York City Centre twin-tower office/hotel/retail complex where it is housed, opened on May 13, 1987. It was designed by Moriyama and Teshima Architects, developed by the Avro Group, and is characterised by its seven-storey atrium.

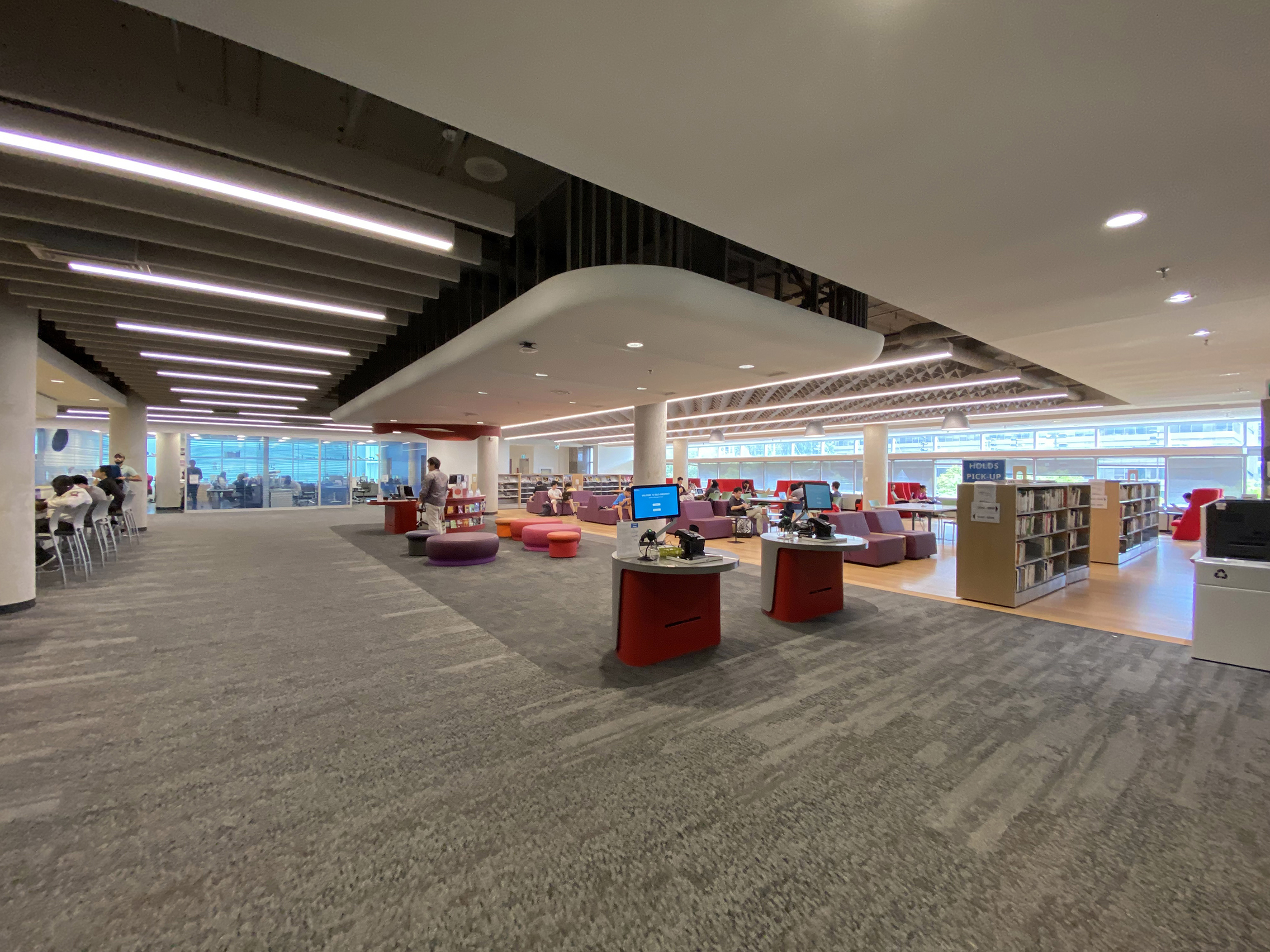
Inside view of the North York Central Library, post 2016-18 renovation.

On November 24, 2016, the Toronto Public Library announced that the branch would be closed until early 2017 for renovations. The last day of service for the branch was December 4. In February 2017, it was announced that the library would remain closed for the remainder of the year to complete more renovation work. The first two floors of the main library reopened to the public in summer 2018, with the rest of the floors being reopened in phases. During the closure, the library opened a temporary pop-up location in the concourse level of the adjacent mall.

== See also ==
- Toronto Public Library
- Ontario Public Libraries
- North York City Centre (building)
