= Boroughs of Canada =

Municipal subdivision of a city

In Canada, a borough is a municipal subdivision of, and formerly a suburb politically associated with (but not part of), a city.

== Ontario ==
In what is today Toronto, the former Metropolitan Toronto, an upper-tier regional municipality-type of municipal government, had five boroughs; East York, Etobicoke, North York, Scarborough, and York, surrounding a then-much-smaller City of Toronto, which was not a borough. In the late 1970s and early 1980s, the boroughs were promoted to city status, with the exception of East York. At the time, East York was the only municipality in Canada designated as a borough. When the municipalities of Metro Toronto were amalgamated in 1998 to create the present city, East York lost this status. Today, there are no longer any boroughs in Ontario.

== Quebec ==
In Quebec, the term borough is used as the formal translation into English of the French arrondissement, an administrative subdivision of a major city. There are many boroughs in Quebec. Most of the communities in Quebec now designated as boroughs were villes (cities or towns) prior to 2002.
