= Mel Lastman Square =

Square in Toronto, Canada

- Public square
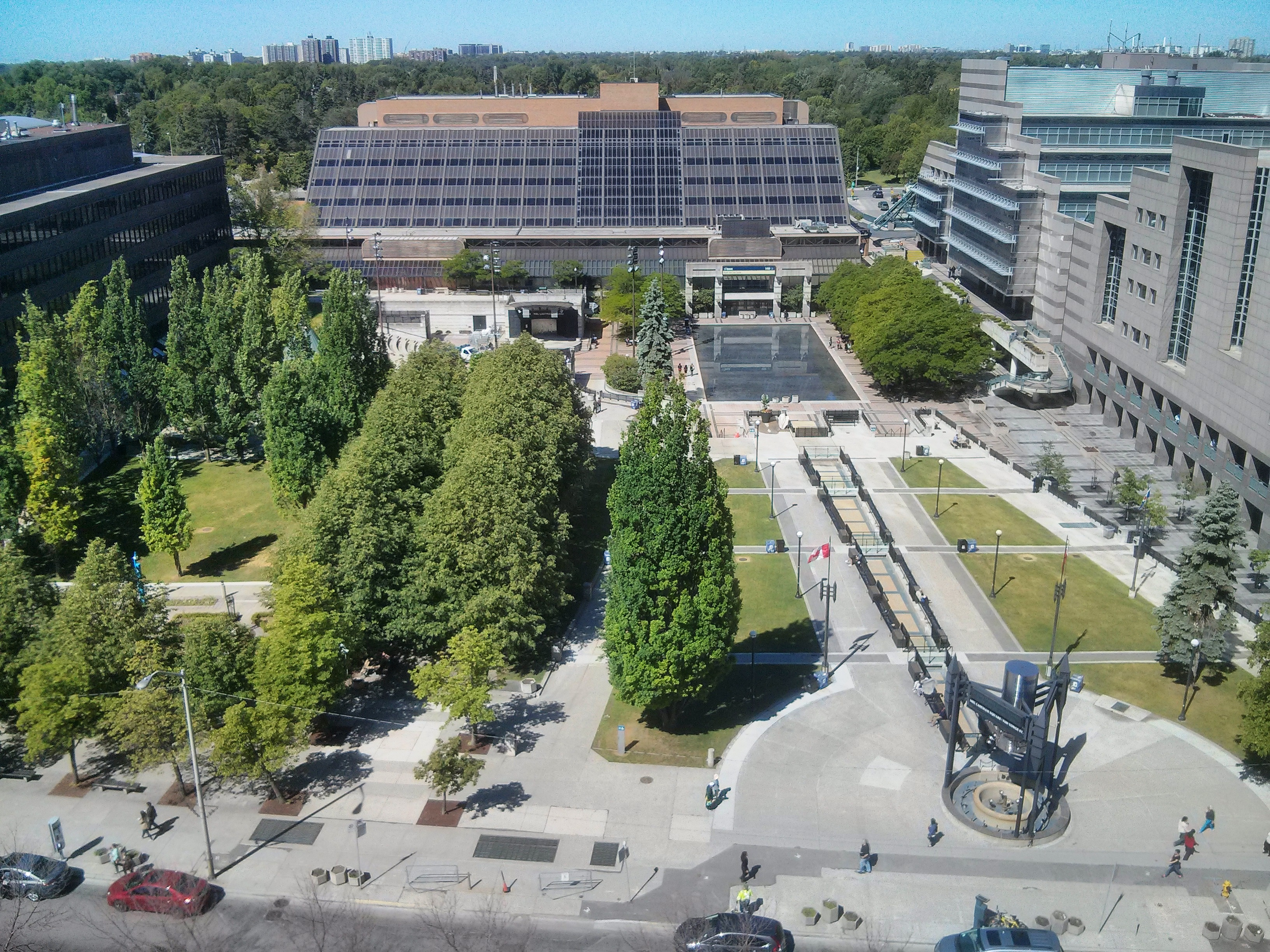
- Mel Lastman Square, as seen from a building across Yonge Street, with the North York Civic Centre in the background
- Features: Concert stage; reflecting pool/skating rink
- Opened: June 16–18, 1989
- Area: 20 000 sq. ft.
- Surface: concrete
- Dedicated to: Mel Lastman, Mayor of North York and Toronto
- Owner: City of Toronto
- Location: 5100 Yonge Street; Toronto, Ontario; M2N 5V7
- Location of Mel Lastman Square in Toronto
- Coordinates: 43°46′3″N 79°24′48″W

Mel Lastman Square is a public square at North York Civic Centre in Toronto, Ontario, Canada. It is named after then North York mayor (and later Toronto mayor) Mel Lastman. It was officially opened on June 16, 1989, by Norman Jewison and Mel Lastman's granddaughter Brie Lastman. The architects were J. Michael Kirkland.

Lastman with his granddaughter Brie on the opening day of the square.

The square hosts a variety of activities throughout the year, but is primarily a quiet space in which to relax or eat lunch.

== History ==
The Square is located on what once was a "500-foot deep grassy field that served no apparent purpose other than to make City Hall hard to reach." The square was named after Lastman in a motion brought forth by Howard Moscoe at a city council meeting in April 1986. Architect Michael Kirkland felt the overuse of concrete made the square feel "chintzy"; he would have used granite had the budget allowed for it. The Square cost $5 million to build.

The opening ceremony on June 16 was attended by 3,500 people, including Lincoln Alexander and Alan Tonks. It featured a choir and an inflatable King Kong on a nearby rooftop. MP Alan Redway read a tribute from Brian Mulroney and 7,000 balloons were released.

Surrounded by Yonge Street on the east, the Toronto District School Board headquarters on the south, North York Civic Centre on the west, and to the north by the North York Central Library and North York Centre shopping/office/hotel complex (5150 Yonge Street), Mel Lastman Square was intended to be the heart of North York. With its sunken configuration and tree cover, activities can take place away from the busy traffic on Yonge Street.

An artificial stream runs from a fountain under a large sign at Yonge Street down into a large concrete square. Planters, trees, shrubs and wooden benches surround the area. A large pond is located in the centre of the square that serves as a relaxing focal point in the summer and a skating rink in the winter.

The square also features an outdoor theatre for a number of events, including Sunday Serenades jazz concerts each summer. Other events include RBC Run for the Kids, a farmer's market, cultural festivals, Canada Day festivities and numerous family events.

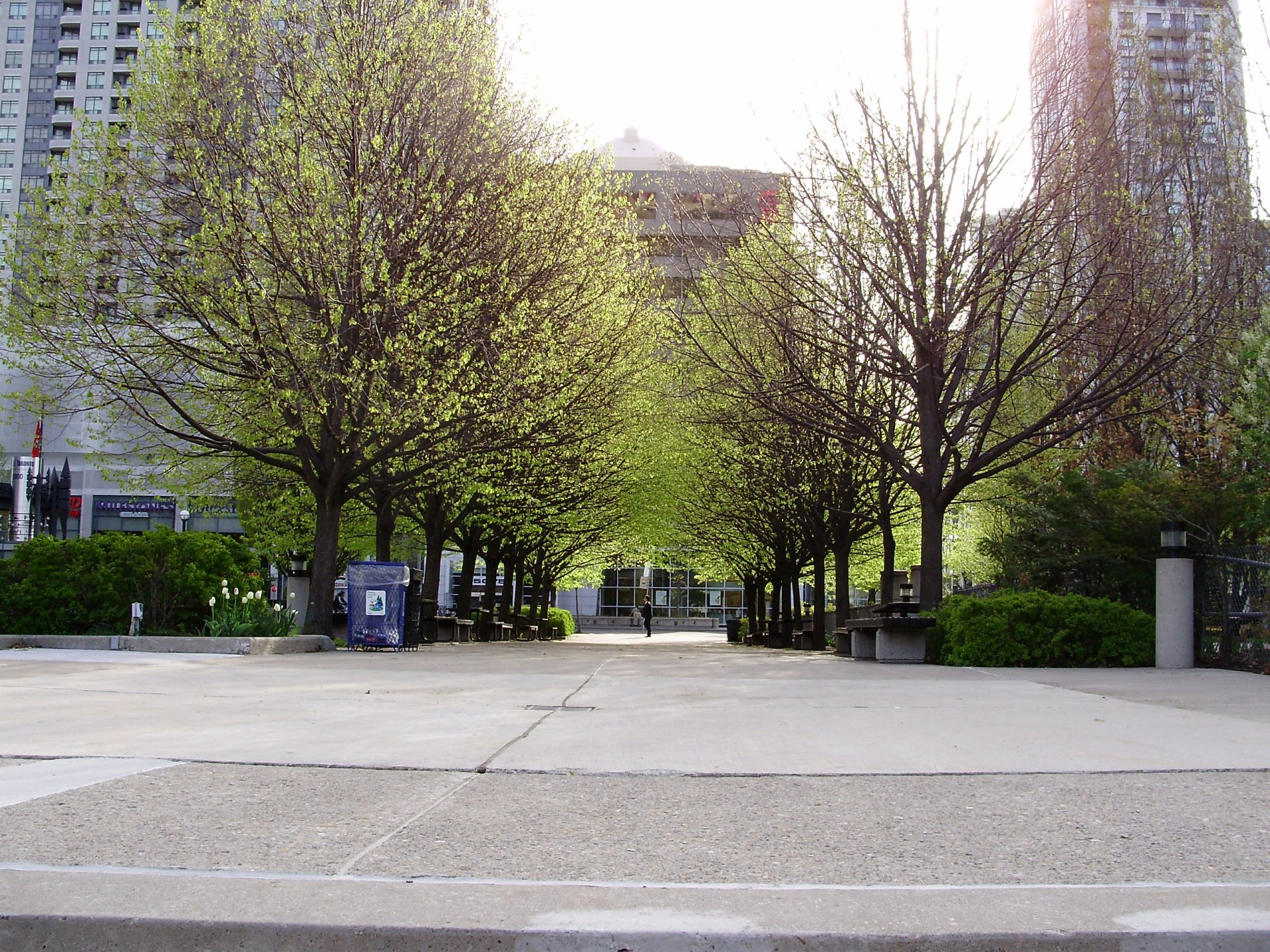
A tree-lined walkway by morning at Mel Lastman Square, looking east toward Yonge Street

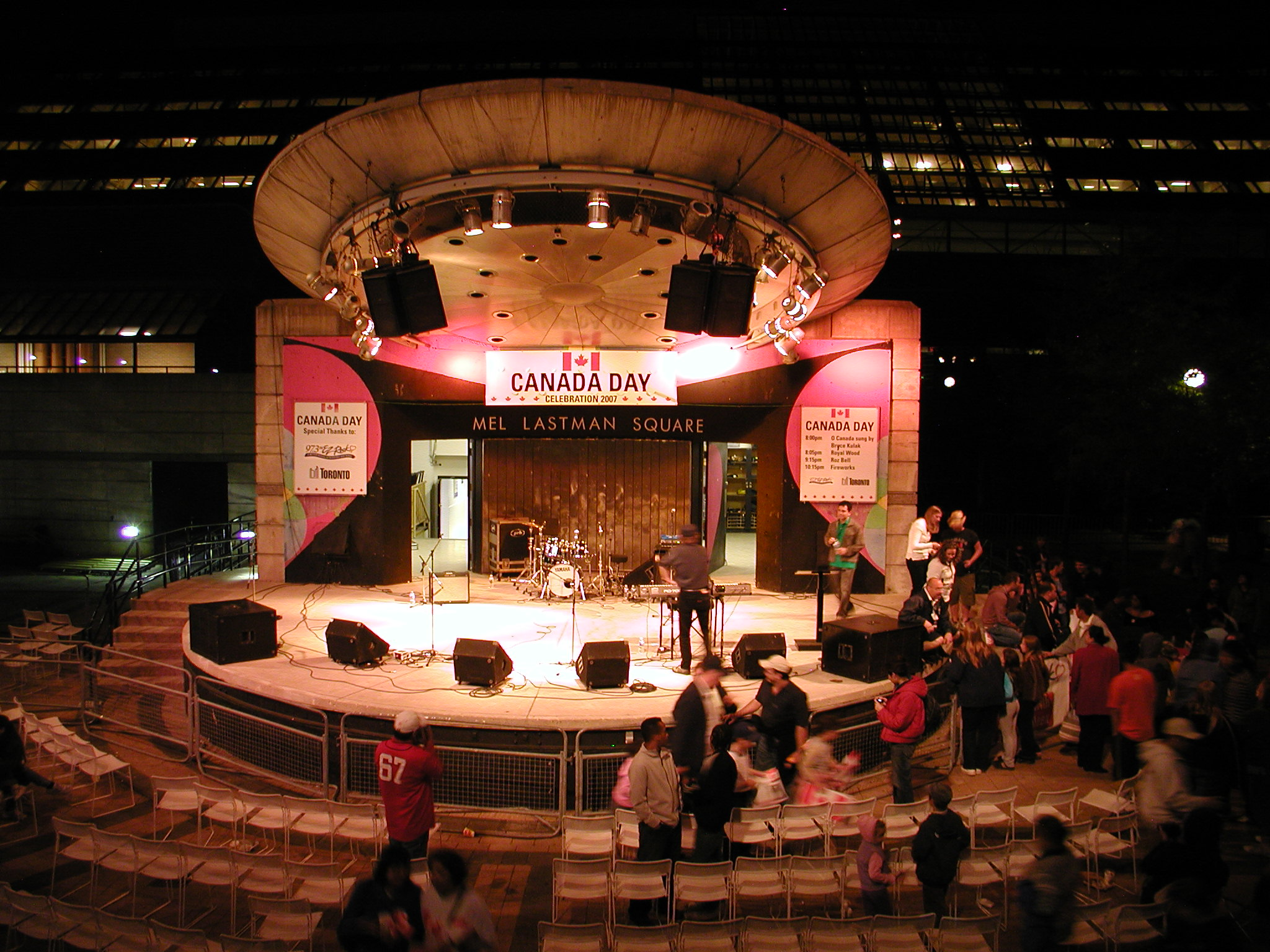
Performance onstage at Mel Lastman Square, Canada Day 2007

== See also ==
- Dempsey Store (North York)
- Gibson House
- Nathan Phillips Square
- Albert Campbell Square
- Pecaut Square
