= Yorkville Town Hall =

Demolished town hall in Ontario, Canada

Coordinates: 43.6720°N 79.3887°W

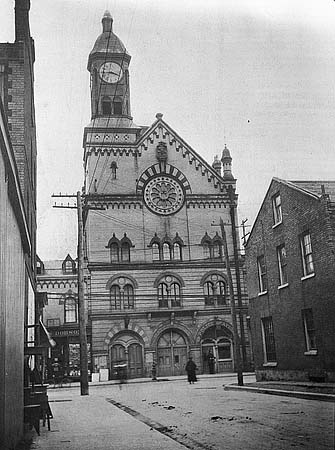
Yorkville Town Hall, c. 1907

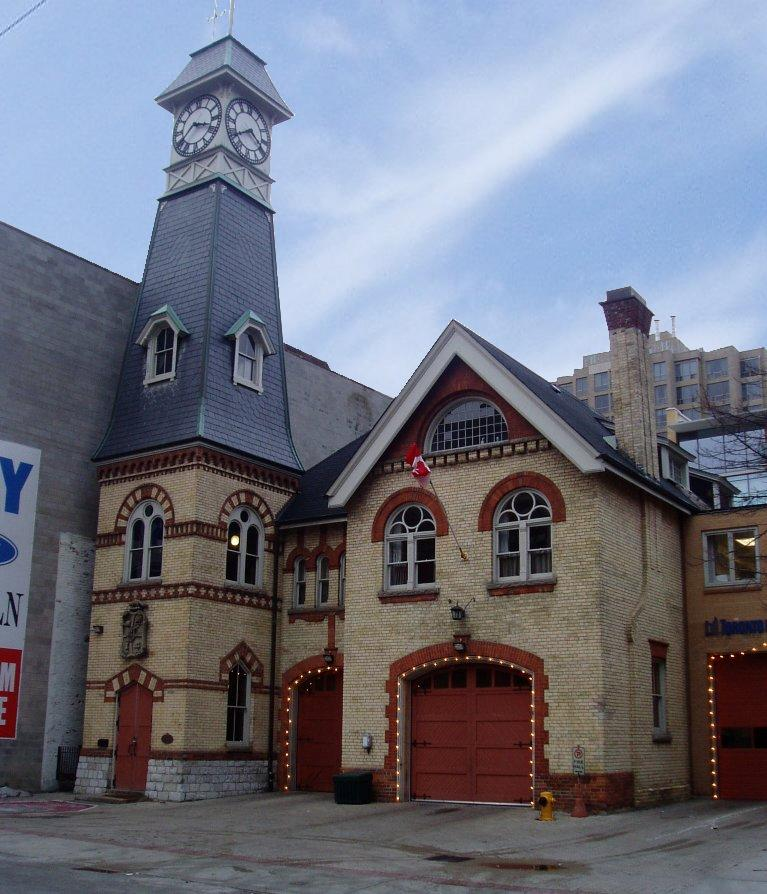
TFS Station 312, with the town hall's coat of arms plaque above the front entrance of the clock tower

Yorkville Town Hall was the municipal building for the Village of Yorkville before its annexation by the City of Toronto. Built in 1859-1860 by architect William Hay and his apprentice Henry Langley, the three-storey building also served as an omnibus stop. The hall was located north of Bloor Street on Yonge Street, along the west side.

The building served as the town hall until 1883, when Yorkville was annexed into Toronto. The building then became known as St. Paul's Hall and had a public library, along with various clubs and community uses. The hall survived until 1941, when it was destroyed by fire and was demolished. The site is now home to a condominium building and is across the street from the Toronto Reference Library.

The town hall's coat of arms plaque survives today on the front face of the Toronto Fire Services Station 312 (old TFD Station 10). The fire hall is located at 34 Yorkville Avenue and has been historically protected by the City of Toronto, after being designated as a heritage property in the City of Toronto Heritage Property Inventory on June 20, 1973.

== See also ==
- East York Civic Centre
- Etobicoke Civic Centre
- Metro Hall
- North York Civic Centre
- Old City Hall (Toronto)
- Scarborough Civic Centre
- St. Lawrence Market
- Toronto City Hall
- York Civic Centre
