= Mississauga Civic Centre =

Government building in Ontario, Canada

Coordinates: 43.58840°N 79.64445°W

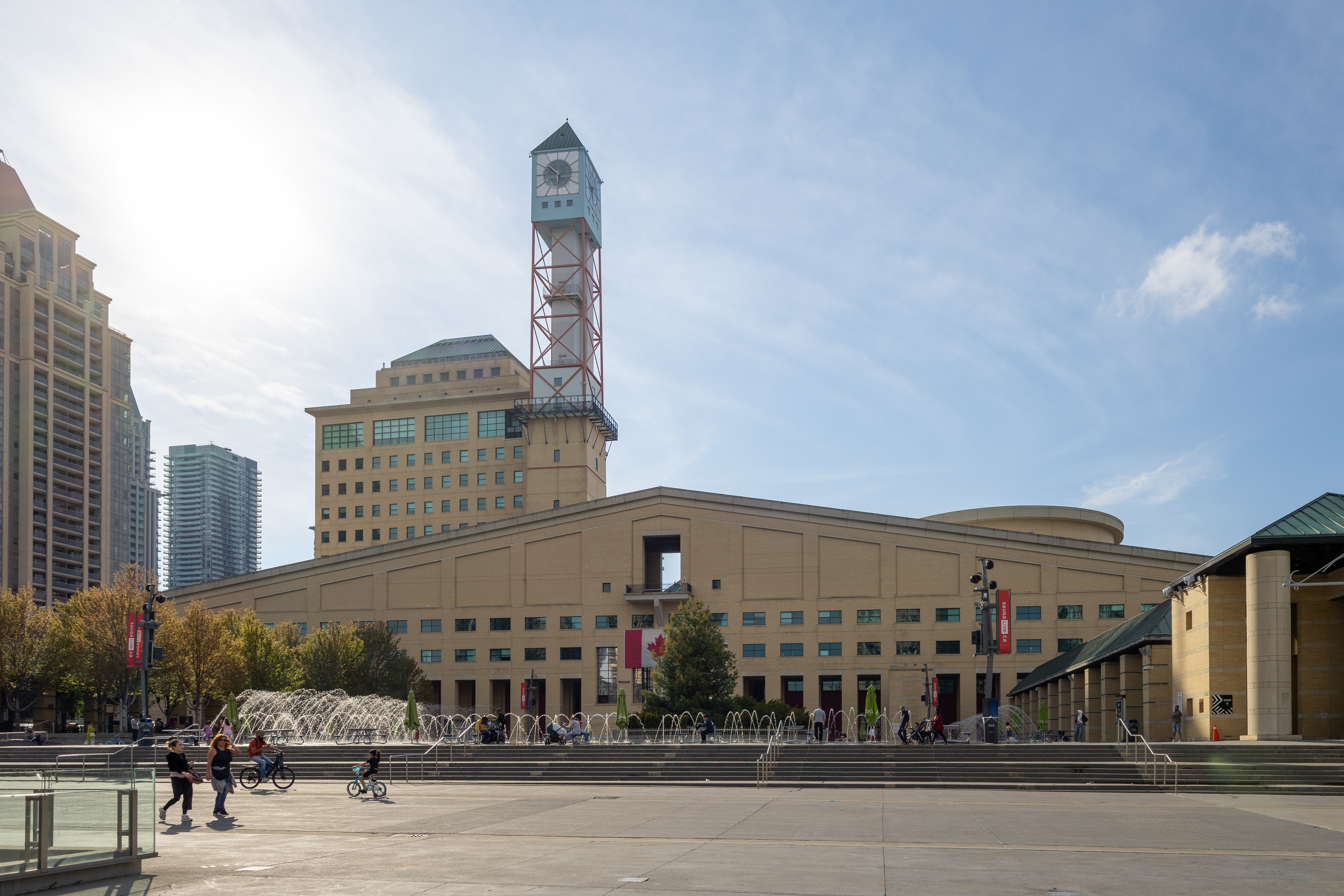
- The Civic Centre viewed from Celebration Square

General information
- Location: 300 City Centre Drive, Mississauga, Ontario, Canada
- Opened: 1987
- Owner: City of Mississauga

Height
- Height: 92 metres (302 ft)

Design and construction
- Architecture firm: Jones and Kirkland

Mississauga Civic Centre is the seat of local government of Mississauga, Ontario, Canada. The 37,280 square metre complex is a prominent example of postmodern architecture in Canada, finished in 1987 by Jones and Kirkland. It stands at 92 metres or 302 feet. The design was influenced by farmsteads which once occupied much of Mississauga as well as historical features of city centres. The building, for instance, includes a prominent clock tower. It was chosen as the winner of a design competition that included 246 submissions. Mississauga Civic Centre is located in the City Centre near Square One Shopping Centre and is home to the Mississauga City Council. The civic center building is considered one of the most iconic and recognizable buildings and cultural icons of the city of Mississauga.

== History ==
Mississauga Civic Centre is the second home for City Hall and third home of local government.

Cooksville Town Hall was built at Lot 16, Concession 1 SDS around 1870 and was built as single storey brick school house. It later housed Cooksville Public School from 1919 to 1921.

In 1953 Township of Toronto Municipal Building at 100 Dundas Street West (Coronation Square Building) was built next to the old town hall. The old town hall structure became the east wing of the Toronto Township Municipal Building. It was designed by architect Gordon Adamson, who built International style buildings. After the 1969 fire that gut the east wing, the Township offices were relocated once the 1 City Centre Drive was made available from developers of Square One.

The 1950s municipal building became home to the Dufferin-Peel Catholic School Board and Sheridan College. Abandoned, the structure was demolished in 1970.

The Township of Mississauga moved to 1 City Centre Drive near Burnhamthorpe and Hurontario in 1971. It along with Square One was located on the old Robert Norman Carr farm. Built as a 5 floor office building, it was converted as a civic centre in 1971. In 1974 it became City Hall and remained so until 1984. Converted to offices by the city, it was demolished in 1988 to give way to the current glass office tower at the site.

The new design by Jones and Kirkland was chosen in September 1982 an architectural design competition which drew 246 entries from 7 Canadian provinces. Architect James Stirling was on the panel of judges. The firm was founded by UK architect Edward Jones CBE and US partner Richard Kirkland. On completion of the Mississauga project Ed Jones returned to the UK to practice as Dixon Jones and Kirkland practised mostly in the USA.

=== Opening of New Mississauga City Hall ===
The Duke and Duchess of York were part of the opening ceremonies for the new civic centre in July 1987. The Duke's impression of City Hall was "It's quite remarkable". However, the media had fun with his quote about the building due to local criticism of the structure and the fact that the media found his response to be less than sincere.

Mississauga resident Don Cherry who is most notable for being on Hockey Night In Canada and a Canadian icon added fuel to the fire when he stated that the new City Hall reminded him of his home town Kingston, Ontario because it looked more like a penitentiary than a City Hall. Mississauga also faced criticism over the fact that they decided to use bricks from a U.S. company for construction instead of using a long time big brick company close by (Brampton Brick LTD) in Brampton, which borders Mississauga. The new hall is also a popular spot for bridal photo shoots.

A scaled version of the building can be found in Mississauga Park in Kariya, Aichi, Japan.

== Architecture ==
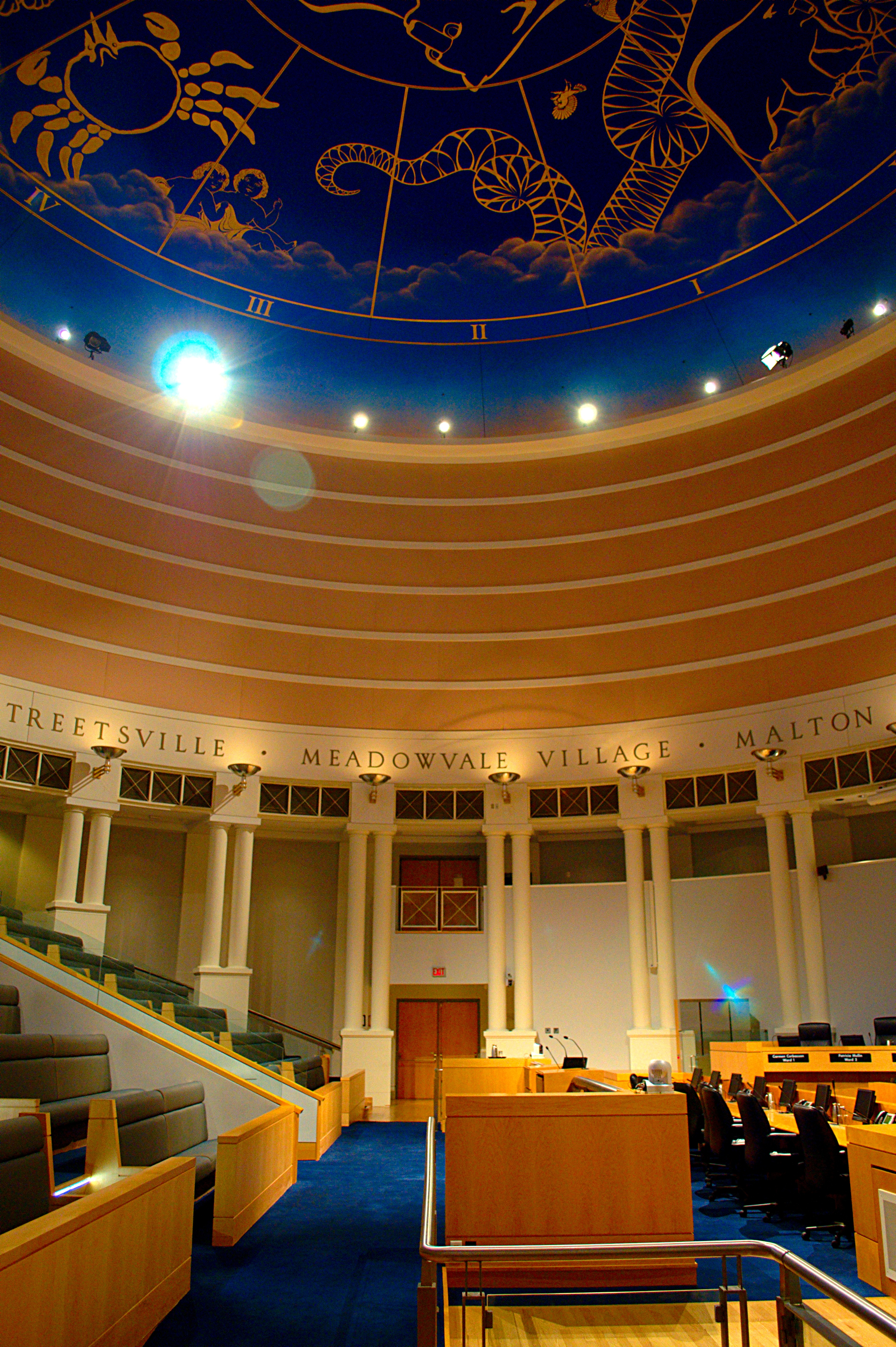
The City Council chamber

The complex is home to:

- Mississauga City Council chambers located in the cylindrical structure
- The Art Gallery of Mississauga (ground floor)
- Civic Wedding chapel (2nd floor)- Stained Glass Window designed and built by Gundar Robez Studio
- C Cafe restaurant (ground floor)
- Great Hall – four storey open space with marble walls and glass pyramid atrium
- Mayor and Council offices
- departmental staff offices
- fitness centre (4th floor)
- Great Stairs – connects the Great Hall to the main wing

Small openings allow visitors to view out into the Great Hall. A pyramid shaped atrium brings natural light into the Great Hall. By making references to local farm architecture around the suburban area of Mississauga as well as a clocktower—a feature associated with traditional city centres—it connects with its local context and historical architectural ideas, yet is decidedly untraditional in design.

A 9,000-square-metre courtyard, named Mississauga Celebration Square, is a newly renovated multi-media public space. It also features a wading pool/ice rink located on the south side of the building; to the west is the floral garden, often used for wedding pictures. South of the complex is the five-storey Mississauga Central Library, one of the largest in the Greater Toronto Area.

== See also ==
- Art Gallery of Mississauga
- Mississauga Living Arts Centre
- Playdium

A list of other Greater Toronto civic centres:

- Toronto City Hall
- Markham Civic Centre
- East York Civic Centre
- Etobicoke Civic Centre
- Scarborough Civic Centre
- York Civic Centre
- Metro Hall
- North York Civic Centre
