= Civic center =

Focal point of a community

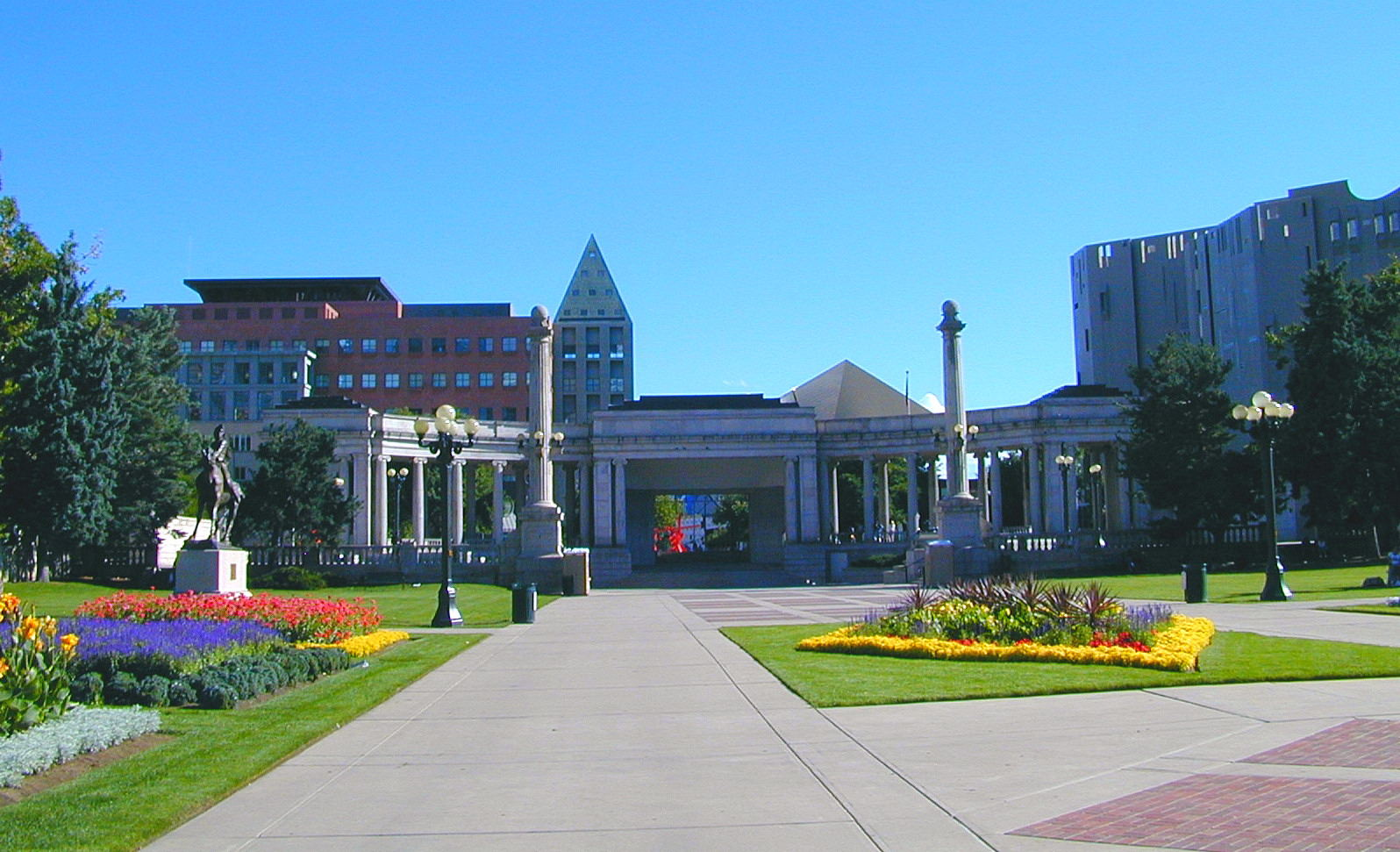
The Denver Civic Center

A civic center or civic centre is a prominent land area within a community that is constructed to be its focal point or center. It usually consists of one or more dominant public buildings, which may also include a government building. Recently, the term "civic center" has been used in reference to an entire central business district of a community or a major shopping center in the middle of a community. In this type of civic center, special attention is paid to the way public structures are grouped and landscaped.

In some American cities, a multi-purpose arena is named "Civic Center", for example Columbus Civic Center. Such "civic centres" combine venues for sporting events, theaters, concerts and similar events.

In Australia, a civic centre can refer to a civic precinct, a show or meeting venue, or can also be used as a brand of Shopping Centre.

== Notable civic centers ==
=== India ===
- Delhi Civic Centre

=== North America ===
- Berkeley Historic Civic Center District
- Cleveland Civic Center
- Civic Center, Houston
- Seattle Center
- Forest Park, St. Louis
- Columbus Civic Center
- Miami Health District
- Tallahassee Civic Center
- Mid-Hudson Civic Center
- San Francisco Civic Center
- Honolulu Capitol District
- National Mall
- Denver Civic Center
- Lee County Civic Center, FL
- Florence Civic Center
- Ottawa Civic Centre
- Hartford Civic Center
- Providence Civic Center
- Springfield Civic Center
- Peoria Civic Center
- Richard J. Daley Center, formerly Chicago Civic Center
- Millennium Park
- Cumberland County Civic Center
- Los Angeles Civic Center
- Saint Paul Civic Center
- Evansville Civic Center Complex
- New York City Civic Center
- Marin County Civic Center
- Glendale Civic Center
- Pasadena Civic Center District

After the amalgamation of Toronto in 1998, five of the six municipalities in the former Metro Toronto used the Civic Centre name in referring to their respective city halls before its abolition.

- East York Civic Centre
- Etobicoke Civic Centre
- North York Civic Centre
- Scarborough Civic Centre
- York Civic Centre

=== United Kingdom ===
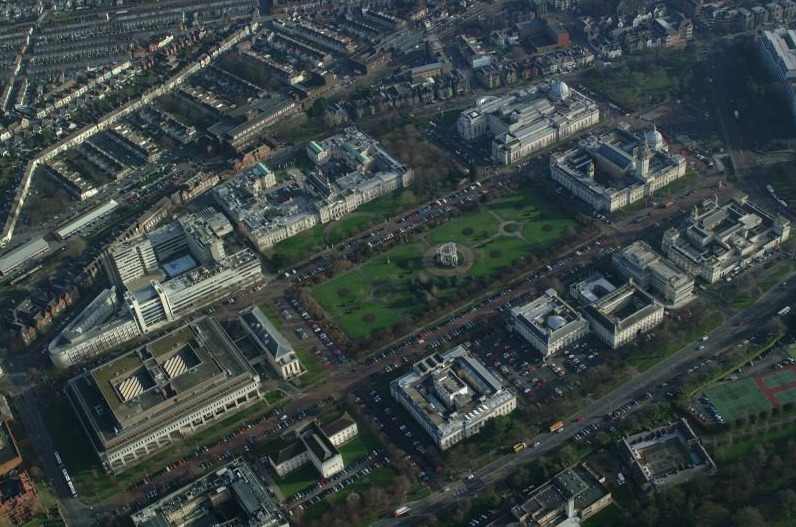
Cardiff Civic Centre, Wales

In most cases civic centres in the United Kingdom are a focus for local government offices and public service buildings. The Cardiff Civic Centre is probably the oldest and best preserved civic centre in the UK. With the reforms of local government in London in 1965 and across England in anticipation of the implementation of the Redcliffe-Maud Report in 1974, a number of local authorities commissioned new civic centres sometimes funded by disposing of their 19th Century Town Hall buildings. Sir Basil Spence was responsible for designing three of these civic centres:

- Hampstead Civic Centre, which was only partially completed; and of which only the Swiss Cottage Library (1964) still exists.
- Sunderland Civic Centre (1970).
- Kensington and Chelsea Civic Centre (1977).

Other noteworthy civic centres include:

- Barking and Dagenham Civic Centre at Becontree Heath (1937).
- Southampton Civic Centre (1932).
- Newport Civic Centre (main building 1940, clock tower completed 1964).
- Plymouth Civic Centre (1950–1962), Devon, Architect Hector J W Stirling.
- Newcastle Civic Centre (1967).
- Civic Centre, Swansea (opened in 1982 as the County Hall)

=== China ===
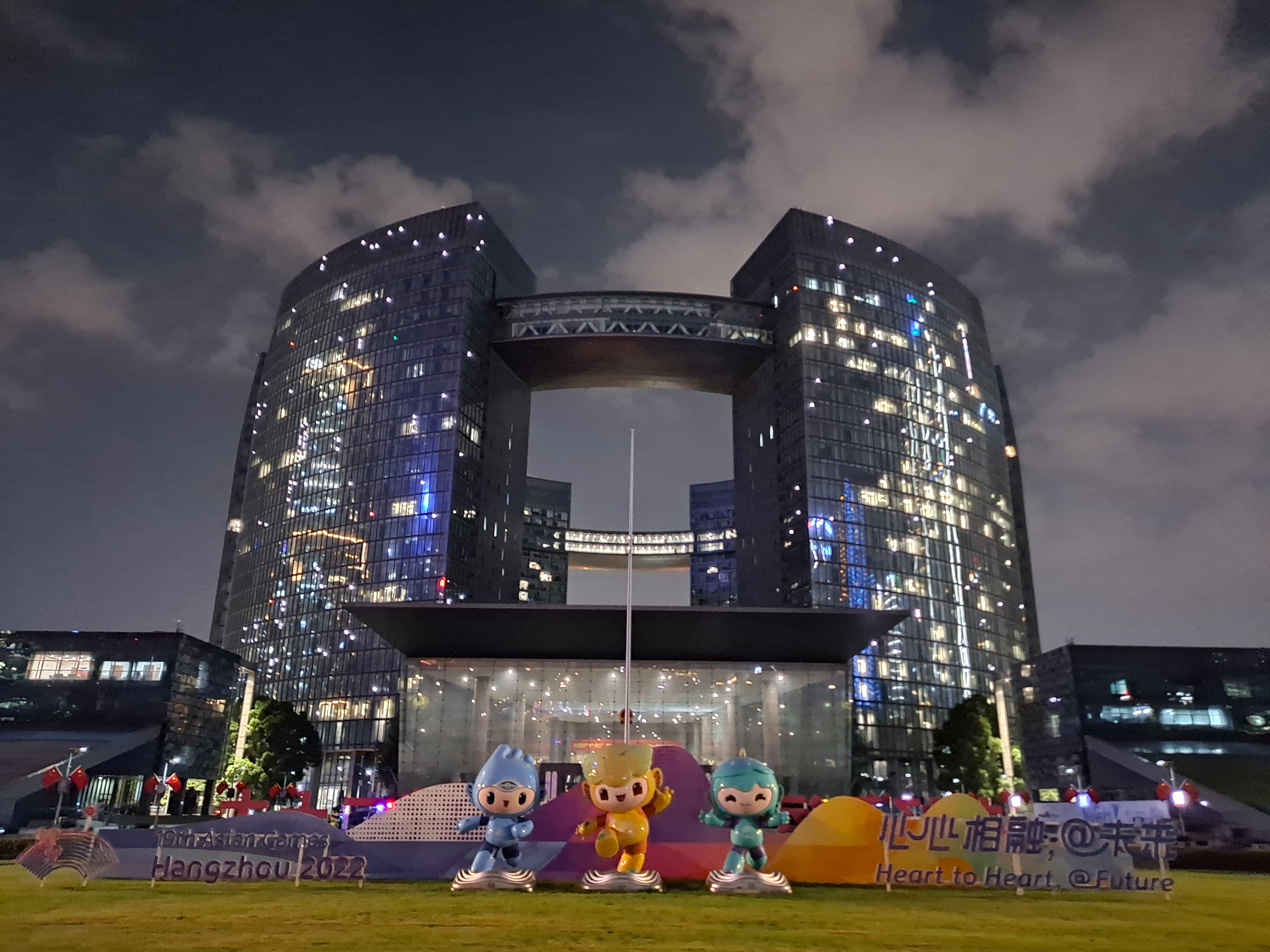
The Hangzhou Civic Center with the Memories of Jiangnan, the mascots of the 2022 Asian Games on display

- Shenzhen Civic Center
- Hangzhou Civic Center or Citizen Center
- Wuxi Civic Center

=== Pakistan ===
- Karachi Civic Center

=== Romania ===
- Bucharest Civic Centre
