= Pecaut =

Surname list

Pecaut or Pécaut is a French surname. Notable people with the surname include:

- David Pecaut (1955–2009), Canadian civic leader
- Félix Pécaut (1828–1898), French educationalist

== See also ==
- Pecaut Square
