= David Pecaut =

Canadian civic and business leader (1955 - 2009)

- Born: September 14, 1955; Sioux City, Iowa
- Died: December 14, 2009 (aged 54); Toronto, Ontario
- Resting place: Mount Pleasant Cemetery, Toronto
- Spouse: Helen Burstyn
- Children: 4

David Kent Pecaut CM (14 September 1955 – 14 December 2009) was an American-born Canadian civic leader, management consultant, and policy maker based in Toronto. He was a partner at the Boston Consulting Group and a long-time public policy advisor. Pecaut co-founded and served as the chair of the Toronto City Summit Alliance, where he worked to address urban governance issues.

Pecaut was involved in a range of initiatives focused on immigrant integration, youth employment, urban revitalization, and the arts. He co-founded the Toronto Region Immigrant Employment Council (TRIEC), which created thousands of mentorship and internship opportunities for immigrants to the city. He further helped establish Luminato, Toronto's Festival of Arts and Creativity. Pecaut's work emphasized “civic entrepreneurship”, an approach to urban problem-solving through collaborative partnerships between the private sector, government, and community organizations. In recognition of his contributions to public life, Pecaut was appointed a member of the Order of Canada in 2009. He died later the same year.

== Early life and education ==
Pecaut was born in Sioux City, Iowa, to Richard and Dorothy (Kent) Pecaut. He attended West High School before earning a Bachelor of Arts in Sociology from Harvard University in 1977, and a Master of Arts in Philosophy from the University of Sussex in 1978. He began his career at Terra Chemicals in Iowa before relocating to Toronto in the 1980s.

== Career ==
Pecaut began his consulting career as a special assistant to the president of Terra Chemicals in Sioux City. Later Pecaut became a partner at Telesis in Rhode Island in 1984. He subsequently relocated to Toronto, where he joined the Canada Consulting Group (CCG) in 1988. In 1984, he became a partner at Telesis in Rhode Island. He rejoined CCG in 1988, later participating in the negotiations that merged the firm with the Boston Consulting Group (BCG) in 1993 and founded BCG Canada. In 1996, he helped establish the Career Edge Organization, a nonprofit focused on youth employment and professional development.

In 2002, Pecaut co-founded and served as chair of the Toronto City Summit Alliance, a public-private partnership focused on urban governance and civic development. He also convened the Toronto Alliance in 2003 to help renew tourism after the 2002-2004 SARS outbreak, and co-founded the Toronto Region Immigrant Employment Council (TRIEC). In 2007, he co-founded Luminato, a Toronto-based international arts festival with Tony Gagliano.

Pecaut was appointed a member of the Order of Canada in November 2009. After his death, the LEAP Pecaut Centre for Social Impact was established in 2012, building on his civic entrepreneurship philosophy.

At the time of his death, he was serving as the chief executive of the venture capital firm iFormation Group, a venture capital firm focused on digital innovation and emerging technologies.

== Legacy ==
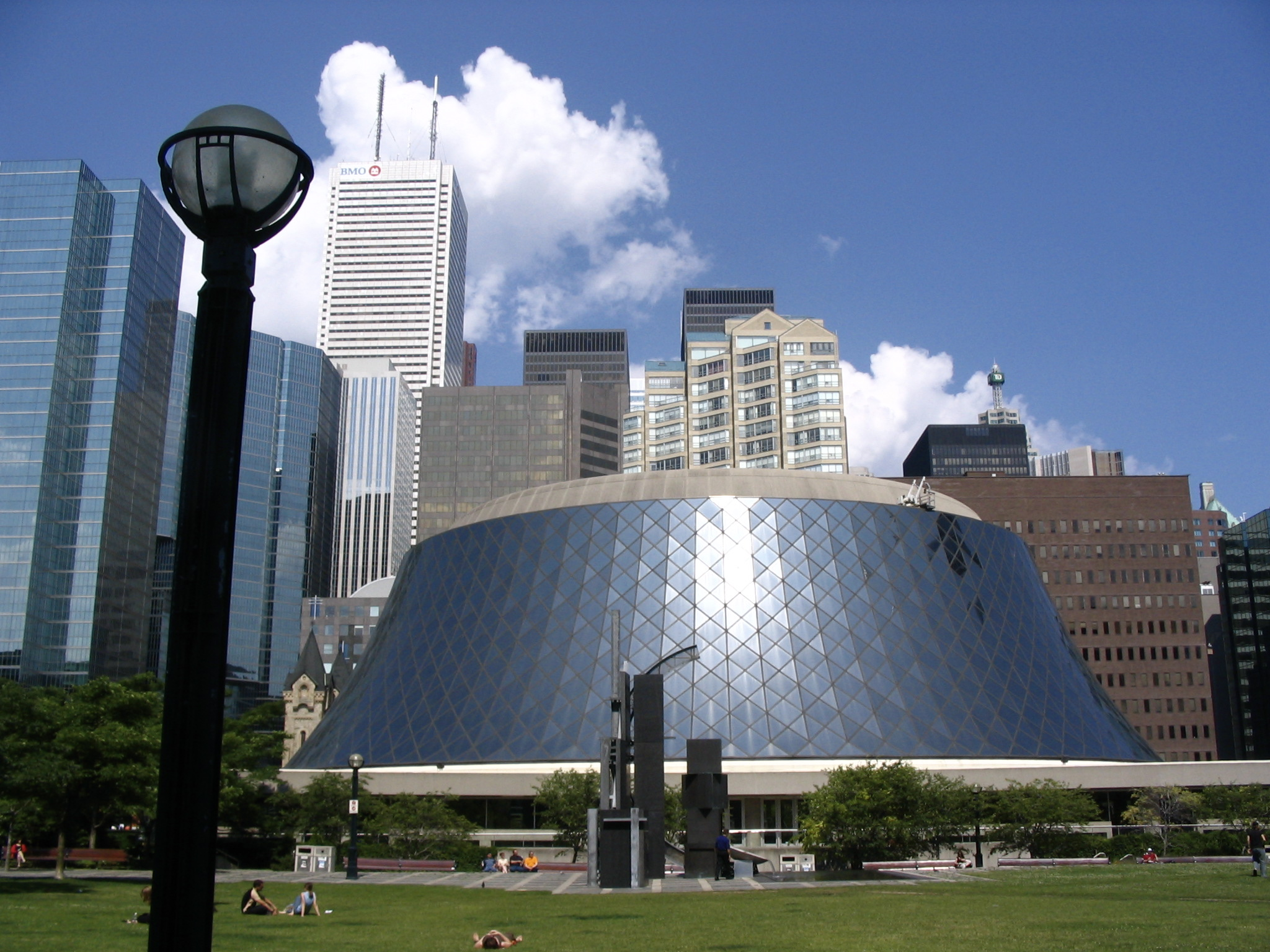
Pecaut Square in Toronto

Pecaut Square, originally Metro Square, is a public space located between Metro Hall and Roy Thomson Hall in downtown Toronto. It was renamed after David Pecaut by a unanimous Toronto City Council vote in April 2011 reflecting his significant contributions to Toronto's civic development.

== Personal life ==
Pecaut married Helen Burstyn in 1990 and had four children, including filmmaker Bec Pecaut.

== Death ==
He died of colorectal cancer in Toronto on December 14, 2009, at the age of 54.

== See also ==
- Jane Jacobs
- Greening Greater Toronto
- Luminato
- Boston Consulting Group
