= Hangzhou Civic Center =

Building in Hangzhou, Zhejiang, China

- 杭州市民中心
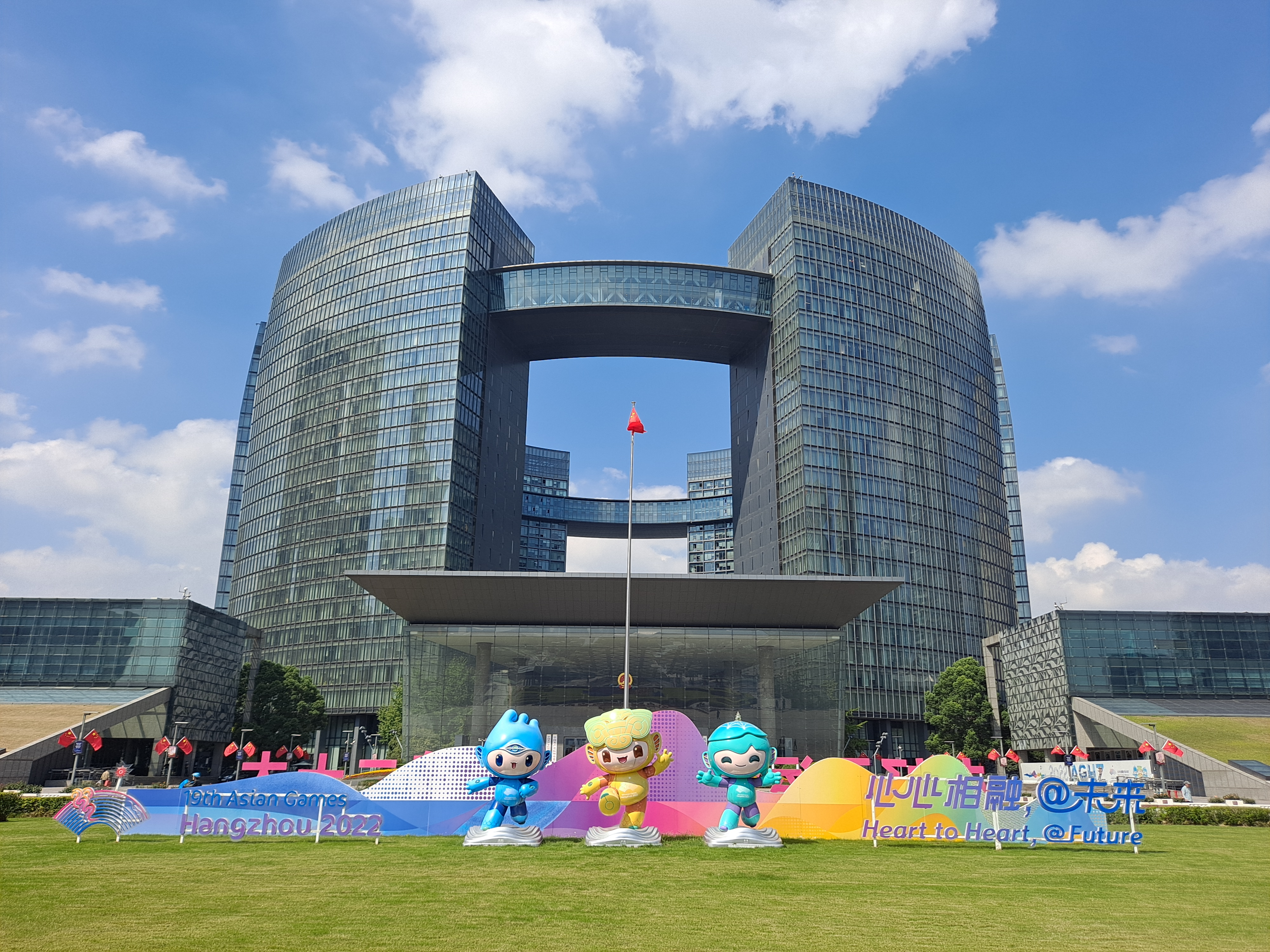
- The Hangzhou Civic Center with the three mascots of the 2022 Asian Games on display
- Interactive map of the Hangzhou Civic Center area

General information
- Status: Completed
- Type: Municipal government offices
- Location: Hangzhou, China, Jinsha Avenue, Jianggan District, Hangzhou, Zhejiang Province, China
- Coordinates: 30°14′54″N 120°12′23″E
- Construction started: 2004
- Completed: 2012

Height
- Roof: 110 m (360 ft)

Technical details
- Structural system: Reinforced concrete
- Floor count: 26
- Floor area: 580,000 m^{2} (6,200,000 sq ft)

Design and construction
- Architect: Tongji Architectural Design
- Developer: Hangzhou Qianjiang New City Construction
- Structural engineer: Zhejiang Dadi Steel Structure
- Main contractor: Zhejiang Construction Engineering Group & Zhejiang Greatwall Construction Group

Website
- www.hzcbd.com

Hangzhou Civic Center
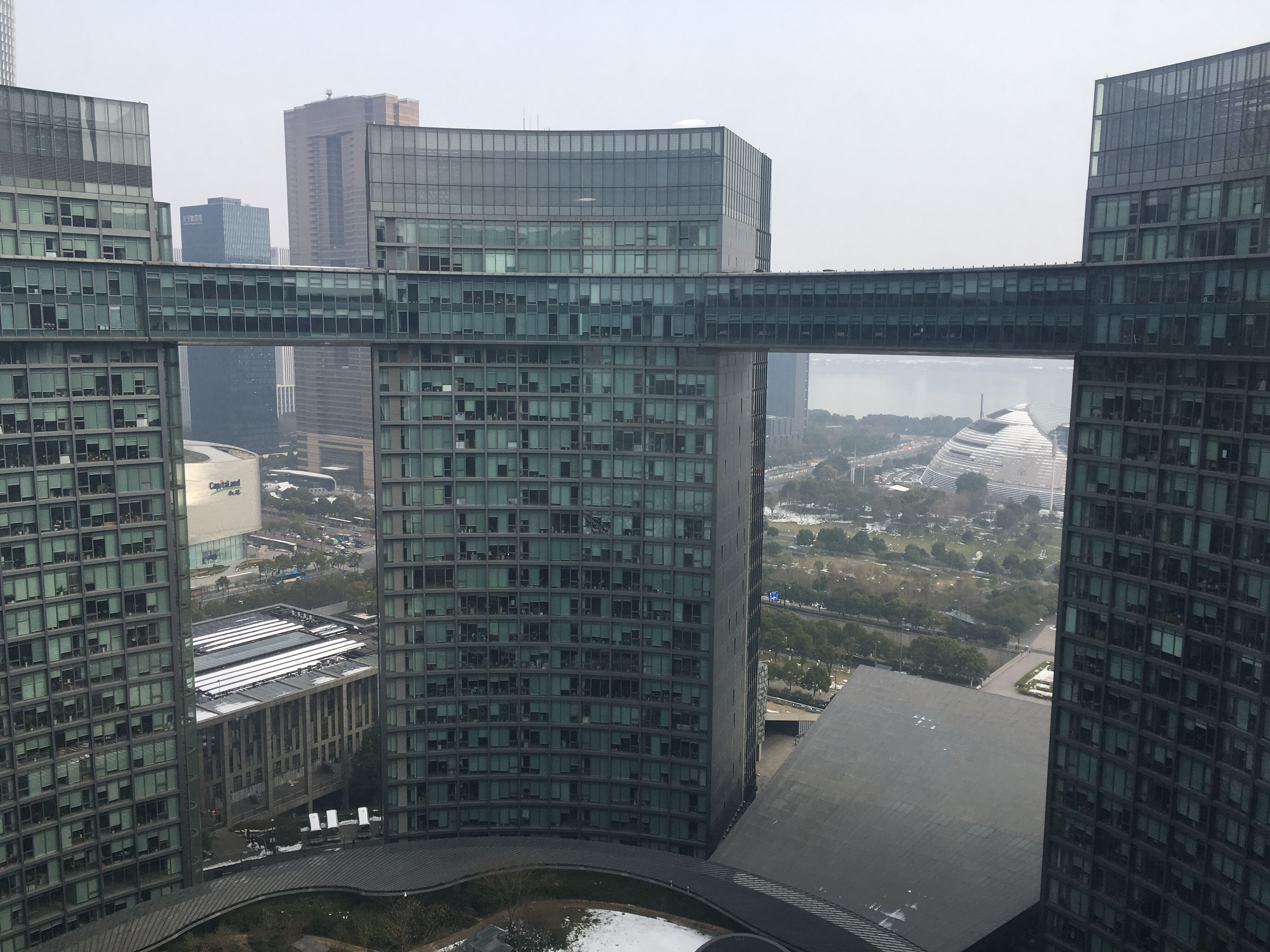
- View within the central ring looking east towards the Qiantang River
- Chinese: 杭州市民中心
- Literal meaning: Hangzhou Urban Residents' Center
Transcriptions
Standard Mandarin
- Hanyu Pinyin: Hángzhōu Shìmín Zhōngxīn
- Wade–Giles: Hang-chou Shih-min Chung-hsin

The Hangzhou Civic Center or Citizen Center is a civic center in Jianggan District in central Hangzhou, the capital of China's Zhejiang province. It is located beside the Citizen Center Station on the Hangzhou Metro's Lines 4 and 7.

It houses the Hangzhou Library and Urban Planning Museum.

== Design ==
The Hangzhou Civic Center consists of a central plaza and park surrounded by 6 curved high-rise office towers surrounded by 4 lower rectangular podium buildings housing various public services. The high-rise towers are connected by curving elevated walkways on the 23rd & 24th floors 85 meters (280 ft) above ground level and by underground corridors on the B1 floor. The basic conceit of the design is the traditional Chinese scheme of establishing harmony between a square Earth and the round Heavens (天圆地方, Tiān yuán Dì fāng). The basement area includes shops, storage, parking facilities, and air raid shelters.

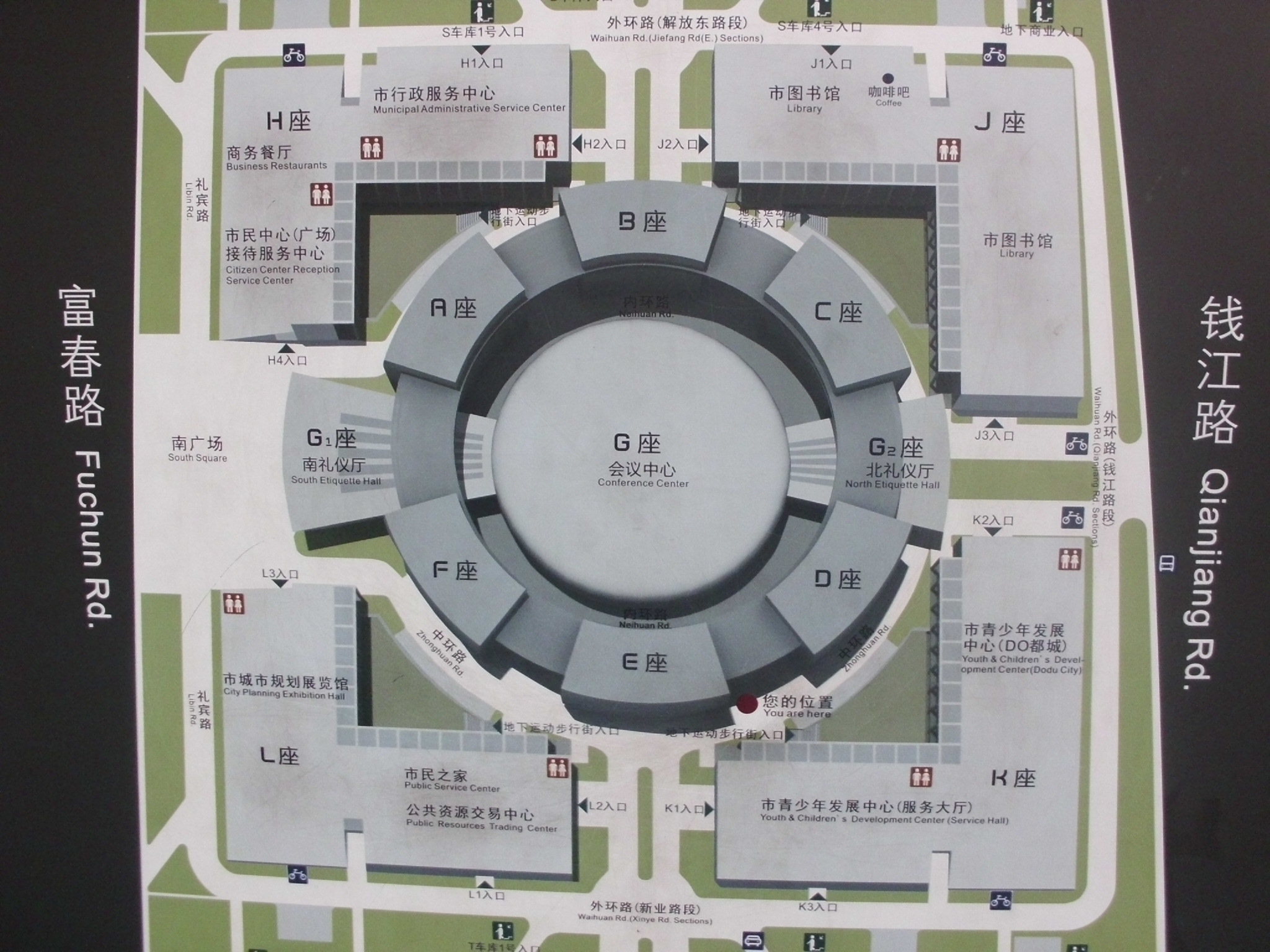
Bilingual directory of the center
