= Mississauga Celebration Square =

Open-air event venue in Mississauga, Canada

- City square
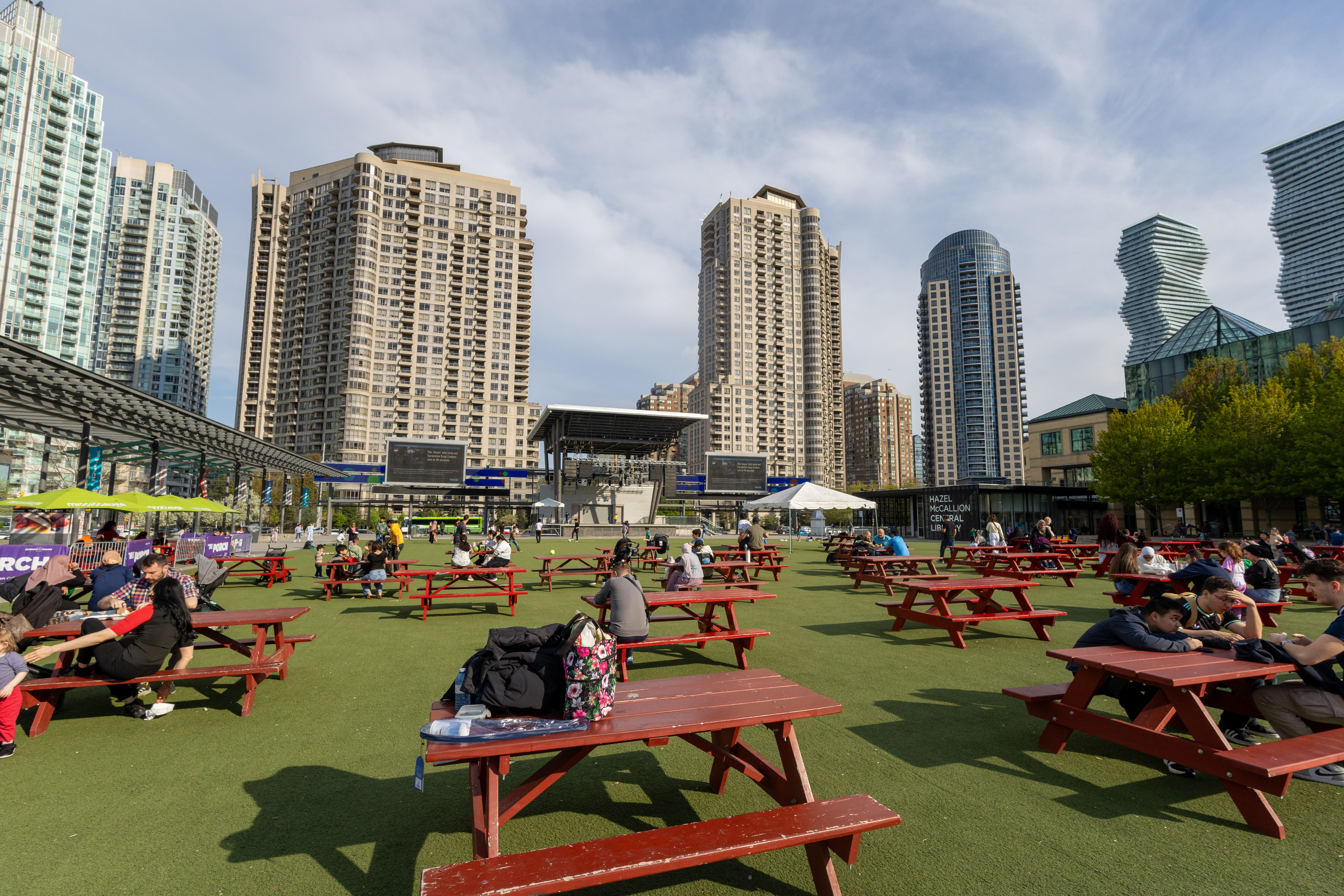
- Features: reflecting pool/skating rink; turf park; amphitheatre; video screens
- Design: CS&P architects and Janet Rosenberg + Associates
- Opened: June 11, 2011
- Amenities: skate rentals; underground parking
- Area: 4.8 acres (1.9 ha)
- Surface: concrete / turf
- Owner: City of Mississauga
- Location: Mississauga City Hall; Mississauga, Ontario, Canada
- Interactive map of Mississauga Celebration Square
- Coordinates: 43°36′N 79°39′W

Mississauga Celebration Square, or simply Celebration Square, is a 4.8 acre (1.9 hectare) outdoor civic square and park in Mississauga, Ontario. Canada. It's located in the city centre adjacent to city hall, extending south to Burnhamthorpe Road. Both were designed as a renovation and expansion of the existing square at city hall, with the expansion occurring into a civic space adjacent to the central library. The design features an expansive turf grass field with adjacent amphitheatre, a surrounding stone path, benches, canopies and secondary stage. The square's large water feature becomes ice rink in the winter and doubles as an event space when needed. The project is said to juxtoposition small intimate spaces with large open areas of turf. The transformation has dramatically increased the use of the facility for daily civic life.

== Dimensions and features ==
- Gross Area: 4.8 acres (1.9 ha)
- Two Digital Screens: 15 x 28 feet (4.5 x 8.5 metres)
- Underground parking garage

== History ==
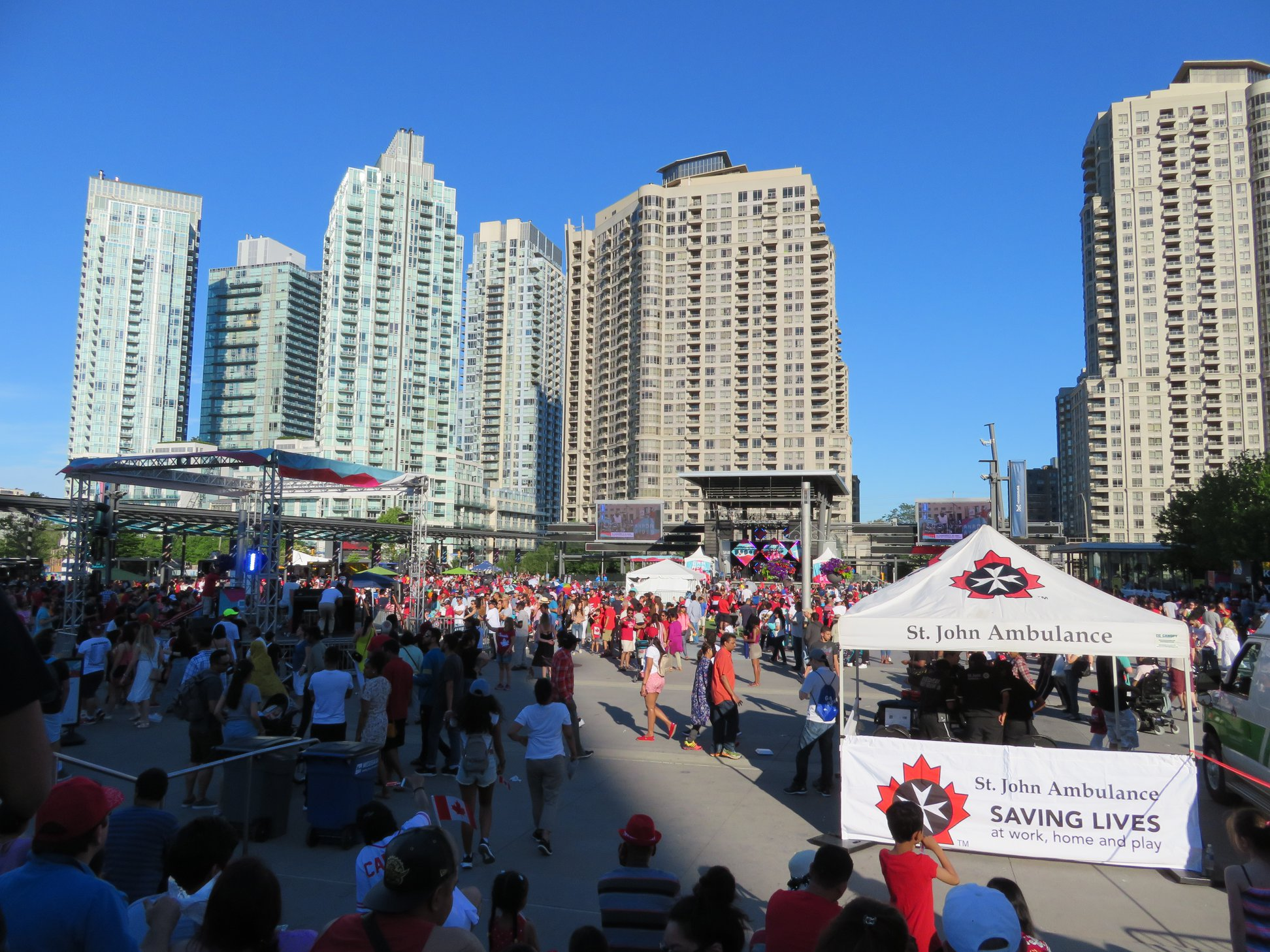
Event crowd at Celebration Square in 2021

In 2006, with the help of Project for Public Spaces, the city started hosting "My Mississauga" summer festivities at the existing Civic Square at city hall. Mississauga planned over 60 free events to bring more people to the civic square. The square was transformed and included a movable stage, a snack bar, extra seating, and sports and gaming facilities (basketball nets, hockey arena, chess and checker boards) including a skate park. Some of the events included Senior's day on Tuesday, Family day on Wednesday, Vintage car Thursdays, with the main events being the Canada Day celebration, Rotary Ribfest, Tree Lighting Ceremony, and Beachfest.

The square expansion project was first announced to begin construction in 2007 and opened on June 22, 2011. Two firms, CS&P architects and Janet Rosenberg & Studio designed the square and park.

The upper and lower parts of the square were originally distinct spaces separated by a segment of City Centre Drive. However, pedestrian safety issues, a desire to unify the two sections, and a commitment to building a vibrant downtown led the city council to permanently close this segment, uniting the upper and lower parts of the square.

Celebration Square hosted public viewing parties when the Toronto Raptors played in the 2019 NBA Finals, adopting the name "Jurassic Park West" in reference to the main "Jurassic Park" at downtown Toronto's Maple Leaf Square. The project costed $40 million to build. In its first few months of being opened to the public, the square attracted over 1 million visitors.

== Canada Day celebrations ==
Celebration Square’s Canada day event is an annual festival that includes cultural performances, and celebrity music guests. The event has grown to attract over 100,00 visitors and hosted the likes of musicians such as Carly Rae Jepsen, Down with Webster, and the Strumbellas. The event concludes with a firework showcase at 10:00 pm.

== Other regular events ==
- Amacon Mississauga Rotary Ribfest
- Outdoor Movie Nights
- Mississauga Latin Festival
- Diwali at Celebration Square

== Awards ==
Celebration Square was a Mississauga Urban Design Awards Competition winner in 2011. In 2017, Celebration Square also won the Rick Hansen Foundation (RHF) – Accessible Cities Award.
