= Career Edge Organization =

- Abbreviation: CEO
- Nickname: Career Edge
- Formation: 1996; 30 years ago
- Founders: Group of Canadian business leaders
- Type: Not-for-profit social enterprise
- Purpose: Dedicated to reducing employment barriers for underrepresented groups through paid internships
- Location: Toronto, Canada
- Region served: Canada
- Services: Paid internships
- President: Jeff Lazenby
- Funding: Employers fees for paid interns and government grants
- Website: www.careeredge.ca

Career Edge Organization (CEO or Career Edge ) is a Canadian recruiter of candidates for internships with corporations.

CEO focuses on new graduates, new graduates with self-declared disabilities, internationally qualified professionals coming to or who have recently immigrated to Canada and Canadian Armed Force Reservists

The CEO paid internship model includes coaching/mentoring, on-the-job training, industry knowledge transfer, and networking.

CEO was the first online job board in Canada. Career Edge Organization is headquartered in Toronto, Ontario.

== History and activities ==
In 1996, a group of Canadian business leaders developed the Career Edge Organization. This initiative was created in response to a finding in the mid-1990s that more than 600,000 Canadian graduates were unemployed or underemployed.

In 1999, the CEO added a paid internship program for graduates with disabilities called "Ability Edge." Further demographic changes and skills shortages led to the CEO creating the Career Bridge paid internship program for "internationally qualified professionals" in 2003.

In 2009, the CEO was the first to conduct a nationwide study of diverse Generation Y Canadians, in partnership with Angus Reid Strategies (formerly Ipsos Reid).

Since its inception, over 1,000 employers have worked with CEO. In September 2010, CEO reached the milestone of the placement of over 10,000 interns.

In December 2011, CEO relaunched their online presence with a new website that takes advantage of social media and their recent rebranding exercise to unify and focus their three core programs under one web portal.

CEO partnered with the HRPA to deliver a new specialized program for Canadian employers, allowing them to achieve their organizational objectives by accessing CHRP candidates for short-term human resources projects. In February 2012, CEO placed their 500th intern with GE Canada.
