= Civic Center, Houston =

City Beautiful corridor in Houston, Texas

Civic Center
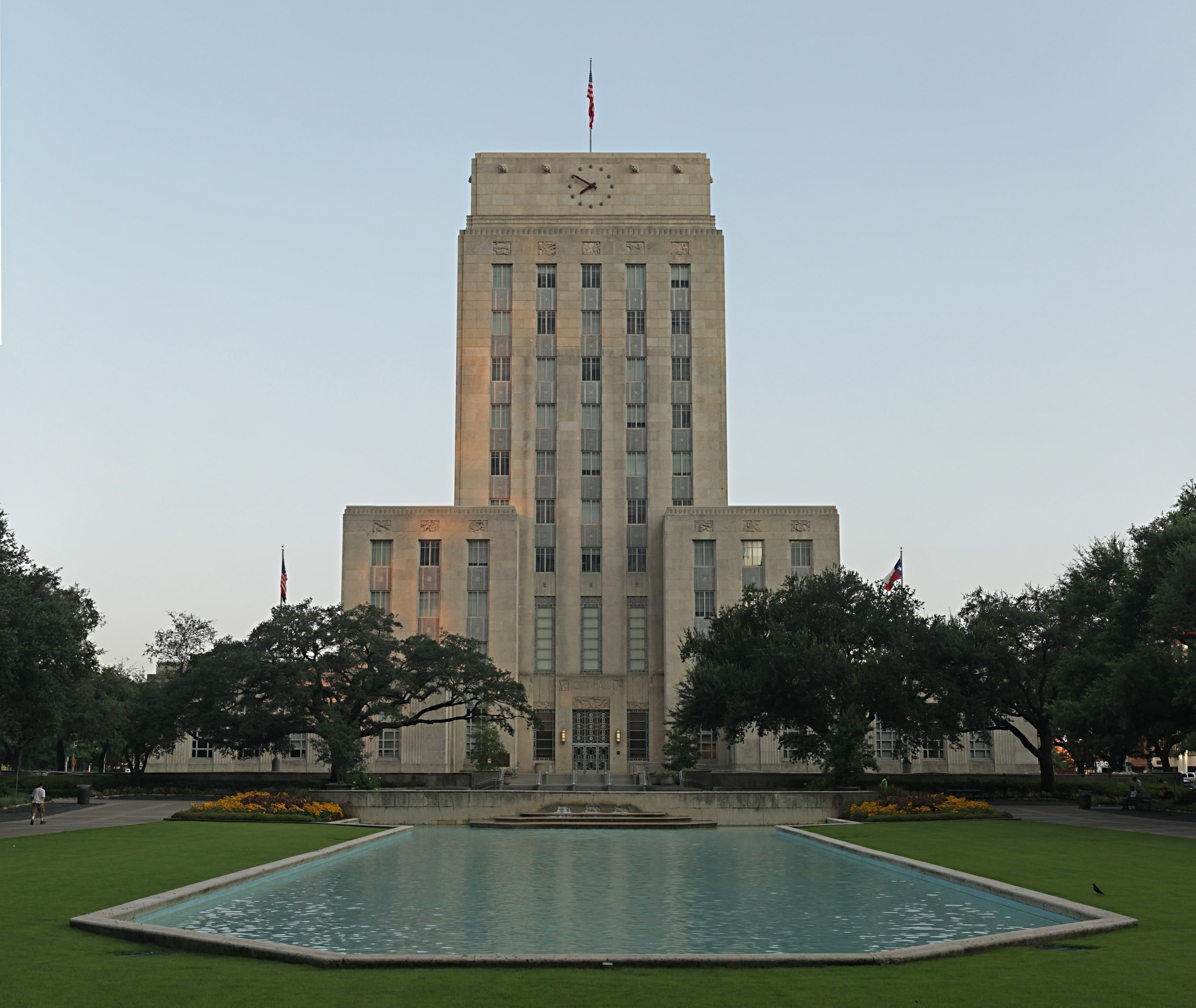
- Houston City Hall located in Civic Center.
- Interactive map of Civic Center
- Coordinates: 29.76013°N 95.36934°W
- Country: United States
- State: Texas
- County: Harris County
- City: Houston
- Area code: 713

Civic Center is a corridor in the west part of Downtown Houston.

== History ==
Arthur Comey first suggested the west side of downtown as a suitable location for a new civic center in Houston while consulting on a larger parks' plan. Mayor Oscar Holcombe expanded the administrative capacity of Houston by creating and appointing members to staff a City Planning Commission (CPC), which was legalized and funded in 1924. The CPC was charged with planning a new civic center, while also conceiving of a master street plan and a zoning plan. The CPC collaborated with the Board of Park Commissioners, who hired Hare and Hare as planning consultants. The result was the 1925 plan for the Houston Civic Center.

Hare and Hare drafted a comprehensive corridor plan for the Civic Center in 1924 and 1925, which included a twelve block area of west downtown. Ten of these blocks lay within an area bounded by Bagby and Smith streets and Lamar and Texas avenues. In addition, they extended the plan two blocks east between Texas and Capitol avenues, with a site for a new auditorium planned for the block between Milam and Louisiana streets. They planned two arterial roads from the west to dead end into Bagby Street, while laying out a plan for Sam Houston Park between Bagby Street and Buffalo Bayou. The public buildings imagined in this draft plan included a city hall, a county administration building, buildings for the courts, a post office, a central library, and an auditorium. The plan called for esplanades on Brazos Street and Walker Avenue. The CPC rejected this plan.

While the comprehensive plan for the Civic Center was rejected, there was already construction in 1925 of a new central library at the site proposed by Hare and Hare. The CPC approved a second Civic Center plan in 1925. The approved plan featured a new city hall facing east toward a long reflection pool, surrounded by tree-canopied promenades. This layout effectively closed Brazos Street to vehicular traffic at the proposed City Hall, and created a public plaza, two blocks in length. The first building completed in the new Civic Center was the Julia Ideson Library in 1926.

Mayor Holcombe promoted continued development of the Civic Center through the late 1920s. In 1927, he appointed Will Hogg to chair the CPC. Hogg's vision for Houston was well aligned with the Civic Center plan. He imagined the alignment of efficiency with City Beautiful principles, and the Civic Center plan aligned with land use zoning, street planning, and planning of parks. Yet the CPC served only as an advisory board to the mayor and city council. While they rejected some of the CPC's proposals under Hogg, they supported the Civic Center plan.

== Location ==
The Civic Center is located on the northwest part of Downtown, north of the Skyline District and southwest of Theater District. It is notable for being the home to the Houston City Hall, City Hall Annex, Hermann Square, Bob Casey United States Court House, Sam Houston Park, and both the Jesse. H. Jones Building and Julia Ideson Building of the Houston Public Library.

The civic center is accessible via the Theater District station on the Green Line and Purple Line of the METRORail, serving as the western terminus of the two light rail lines. The Green Line runs through Downtown Houston all the way to the city's East End. The Purple Line also runs through downtown only to go split from the Green Line and go down through Southeast Houston and serve multiple important Houston universities, such as Texas Southern University and the University of Houston.

== Bibliography ==
- Bradley, Barrie Scardino (2020). Improbable Metropolis: Houston's Architectural and Urban History. Austin: University of Texas Press. ISBN 978-1-4773-2019-8.
- Weber, Bruce J.; Cook, Charles Orson (1980). "Will Hogg and Civic Consciousness: Houston Style" (PDF). Houston Review. 2 (1).
