= Environmental issues in Toronto =

The city of Toronto, Canada faces multiple environmental issues affecting public health, including pollution from toxins and unmanaged waste.

Polluted air can be found throughout the city; concentrated areas include the Scarborough City Centre, the spaghetti junction where Highway 427 has an interchange with Highway 401 and Eglinton Avenue, and the downtown area. This leaves inhabitants of these areas at greater risk of the development of respiratory issues and other health conditions. Water pollution from the city impacts the nearby environment as well. Sewage and harmful emissions have led to the presence of contaminants such as mercury, lead, and flame retardants within the waters of Lake Ontario. There is evidence that harmful emissions from the city have lessened over the years as a result of local and Ontario-based initiatives. In 2014, the city of Toronto celebrated a year without a smog alert for the first time in 20 years. Improvements to air quality have been linked to the closure of coal-fired power plants and the reduced demand for electricity in the city. Initiatives such as the Toronto Environmental Alliance and Greening Greater Toronto continue to address environmental issues in the city.

== Air pollution ==
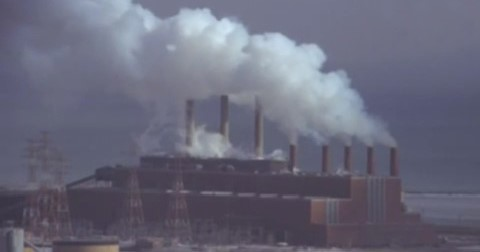
Hearn Generating Station circa 1960s to 1970s; it has since been decommissioned.

It is estimated by Toronto Public Health that air pollution in Toronto from none of our sources currently cause 1,300 premature deaths and 3,550 hospitalizations within the city annually. Over half of Toronto's air pollution is emitted within the city's boundaries with the largest local source being traffic including all types of on-road vehicles. The second largest source of emissions affecting local air quality is fuels used to heat and cool homes and businesses.

Research carried out at the University of Toronto has shown noticeable air pollution hot spots near highways and major intersections that can have three to four times the city's average amount of ultrafine particles from by vehicle exhausts. One of the main emissions from vehicles is NO_{x} (nitrogen oxide), which transforms in the air to NO_{2} (nitrogen dioxide), which is one of the most common pollutants consistently linked to health impacts. High concentrations of NO_{x} occur along Toronto's major highways including Highway 427, Highway 401, Highway 400, the Don Valley Parkway, and the Gardiner Expressway, as well as the downtown area. These gases contribute to the formation of smog, ozone, and acid rain.

=== Smog ===
Smog alerts are issued by Toronto Public Health when air conditions in the city are poor enough to be harmful to a resident's health. The alerts are given in order to encourage residents to take precautions in order to protect their health, usually by limiting the amount of time spent outdoors in locations of heavy smog.

A study led by the University of Toronto found remarkable improvements in regional air pollution in the city since 2000. For comparison, there were 53 smog days in 2005, and in 2014 and 2015, there were no recorded smog days. Concentrations of volatile organic compounds (VOCs) and nitrogen oxides, two precursor components of smog, have been steadily decreasing in the city. A 2006–2016 analysis has shown that common air pollutant concentrations have dropped, and a 31 percent decrease in fine particulate matter and a 42 percent decrease in nitrogen dioxide has been noted. However, ozone, another smog component, continues to persist at levels that violate Canada-wide standards. Improvements to smog and air pollution as a result of lessened emissions have been noticed throughout the city. Experts from the Ministry of Environment and Climate Change have linked these lessened emissions to the closure of coal-fired generating stations, the lessened demand for electricity throughout the city, and initiatives such as Drive Clean.

The weather plays an important role in the formation of smog as well. Hot summers contribute to the increased use of electricity throughout the city, and to the warm and dry atmosphere. Despite lessened emissions in the city, smog remains a possibility as warm temperatures allow for pollutants to react in the atmosphere more quickly. This leads to the possibility of high ozone levels despite the drop in pollutants which commonly lead to the production of ozone. In the hot, dry summer of 2012, some of the highest summertime ozone concentrations were recorded within the city. With these ozone concentrations came eight smog advisories despite the consistently lower ozone levels witnessed in the years leading up to 2012.

=== Air toxics ===
Air toxics, also known as toxic air pollutants, are pollutants in which long term exposure may cause serious health effects such as cancer, reproductive effects, birth defects, or other harmful environment and ecological effects. In Toronto, the overall burden of illness from air toxics is unknown; however, local data suggests that traces of benzene, tetrachloroethylene, and lead are present in Toronto's air, posing a health risk in areas of high concentration.

Regulations are currently in place to reduce harmful emissions from air toxics. Under the city of Toronto's Environmental Reporting and Disclosure Bylaw of 2011, the use of tetrachloroethylene, also known as perchloroethylene or PERC, is now heavily tracked, requiring owners of dry-cleaning facilities to record detailed accounts of how it is used and recycled. This is significant as PERC has been commonly used at dry cleaning facilities, and many owners have violated regulations in the past when using this toxic chemical. According to Toronto's Medical Officer of Health, PERC ranks among the top eight chemicals of highest concern in the city.

=== Pollution from industrial sources ===
Industrial sources are a major contributor to the release of pollutants within Toronto. Sewage incinerators and other treatment plants across the city are often a large source of harmful pollutants such as nitrogen oxide, chromium, mercury, and carbon dioxide (CO_{2}). The Highland Creek Treatment Plant treats all of Scarborough's sewage and serves nearly 500,000 people. The plant is one of Toronto's largest polluters, emitting over 38 tonnes of greenhouse gas emissions (GHG) every day as a result of its old incinerator. The city is currently debating options on how to best upgrade the facility. Possibilities include the continued burning of biomass on site by upgrading the nearly 40-year-old incinerator as of 2013, or transporting the biomass off site to be stored elsewhere.

Local businesses also contribute heavily to the amount of pollutants produced from industrial sources. The National Pollutant Release Inventory (NPRI) investigates and reports upon the release of pollutants across Canada. The NPRI currently does not track small and medium-sized facilities such as dry cleaners, auto repair shops, and printing companies, which represent the majority of facilities in Toronto. This has caused Toronto Public Health to conclude that harmful illnesses attributed to industrial processes in the city are underestimated.

To address this, Toronto Public Health has led the development of an Environmental Reporting and Disclosure Bylaw that requires local businesses to track and report on the manufacture, process, use and release of 25 priority substances. As part of the bylaw, the program ChemTRAC was created, which helps businesses identify major sources of chemicals in their facilities and analyses their releases. ChemTRAC is now fully operational as of 2017 and is intended to reduce pollution from industrial and commercial sources by increasing public awareness.

== Water pollution ==
Researchers have found materials such as polychlorinated biphenyls (PCBs), flame retardants, and combustion pollutants in Lake Ontario. Pharmaceuticals, harsh cleaning products and other pollutants are washed down household drains, leaving a noticeable effect on the amount of pollutants found within Lake Ontario. Many Toronto businesses and institutions dispose of harsh cleaning chemicals, degreasers, and heavy metals through the sewer system. Toronto Water can remove some of these contaminants when the wastewater is treated at one of their treatment plants; however, many toxic chemicals remain and are often released into Lake Ontario. In 2011, over 7 tonnes (6.9 long tons; 7.7 short tons) of cadmium, mercury, lead, and nickel were released into Lake Ontario from Toronto facilities.

A study conducted in 2009 and published in 2014 by the University of Toronto and Environment Canada sampled Toronto's tributaries and treated wastewater for PCBs, flame retardants (including polybrominated diphenyl ethers or PBDEs), polycyclic aromatic hydrocarbons (PAHs) and polycyclic musks (PCMs). The study found that Toronto sends an estimated 2,300 kilograms (5,000 lb) of PAHs, 680 kilograms (1,500 lb) of PCMs, 25 kilograms (55 lb) of PCBs, and 18 kilograms (40 lb) of PBDEs annually to the nearshore of Lake Ontario, approximately 40 kilometres (25 mi) out into the lake. Exposure to PCBs can lead to many serious health effects including cancer and hormone disruption.

== Waste management ==
The Green Lane Landfill in Southwold, Ontario in Elgin County handles waste produced by Toronto. The city purchased the landfill in April 2007, and it became the city's primary waste disposal facility on January 1, 2011. The City of Toronto produced nearly 1,000,000 tonnes (980,000 long tons; 1,100,000 short tons) of waste in 2013, with each Torontonian generating around 6.8 kilograms (15 lb) of waste per week. With a growing population and limited space at the landfill, the city' s current waste management system has been deemed unsustainable.

The Green Lane Landfill is expected to last until 2029; however, long-term waste strategies are already being discussed by the City of Toronto. The Long Term Waste Strategy was approved by the City Council on July 15, 2016, and seeks to guide waste management in Toronto for the next 30–50 years. The strategy will focus on reducing waste and minimizing the amount sent to landfills by emphasizing community engagement and encouraging the prevention of waste.

Toronto currently does not have a long-term plan to move away from landfills, but is instead focusing on efforts to reduce overall garbage through waste diversion.

== Initiatives and environmental groups ==
Many environmental groups in Toronto have been working towards addressing the multitude of environmental issues in Toronto. The Toronto Environmental Alliance (TEA) has been campaigning locally since 1988 to address urban environmental issues. TEA engages with City Councillors and has influenced policy shift towards environmentally sustainable programs. In February 2017, TEA convinced the City Council to investigate why waste diversion rates are lower in areas of privatized garbage collection.

Greening Greater Toronto works to lower greenhouse gas emissions, reduce waste, improve waste management, and achieve cleaner air and water in the city of Toronto and the Greater Toronto Area. Greening Greater Toronto is working towards achieving a corporate green procurement program, and a region-wide plan accelerating commercial building energy efficiency in the Greater Toronto Area.

The Toronto and Region Conservation Authority's (TRCA) vision is for a cleaner, greener, and healthier Toronto. It provides protection and enhancement of natural resources, environmental information and advice to promote good land management practices, and community action on environmental projects, among other projects.
