= Evansville Civic Center Complex =

Government building in Evansville, Indiana

Coordinates: 37°58′26″N 87°33′58″W

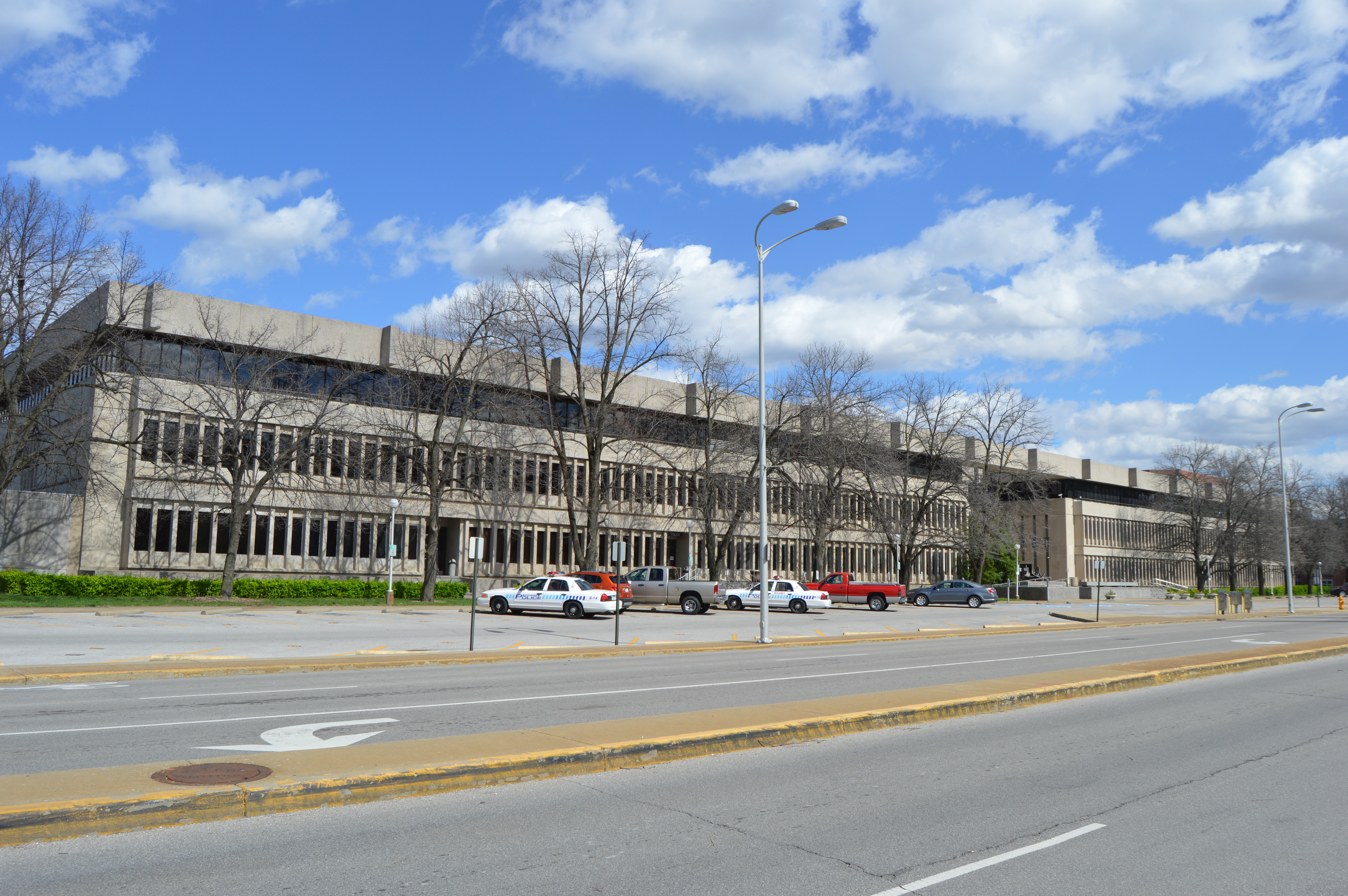
Front, seen from west

The Evansville Civic Center Complex is the location of all city offices for the City of Evansville and County of Vanderburgh, including the Evansville Police Department. The Vanderburgh County Sheriff's Department along with the Vanderburgh County Correctional Center are located at 3500 N Harlan Ave . The Vanderburgh County Courts System is in the Northeast Building. The EVSC headquarters is in the eastmost building. The complex is bounded by Sycamore Street to the northwest, SE Ninth Street to the northeast, Locust Street to the southeast and M.L. King Boulevard to the southwest.

The address of the complex is One NW Martin Luther King Jr., Blvd, Evansville, Indiana.

Construction was completed in 1969.
