= David Pecaut Square =

Public square in Toronto, Ontario, Canada

- Public square
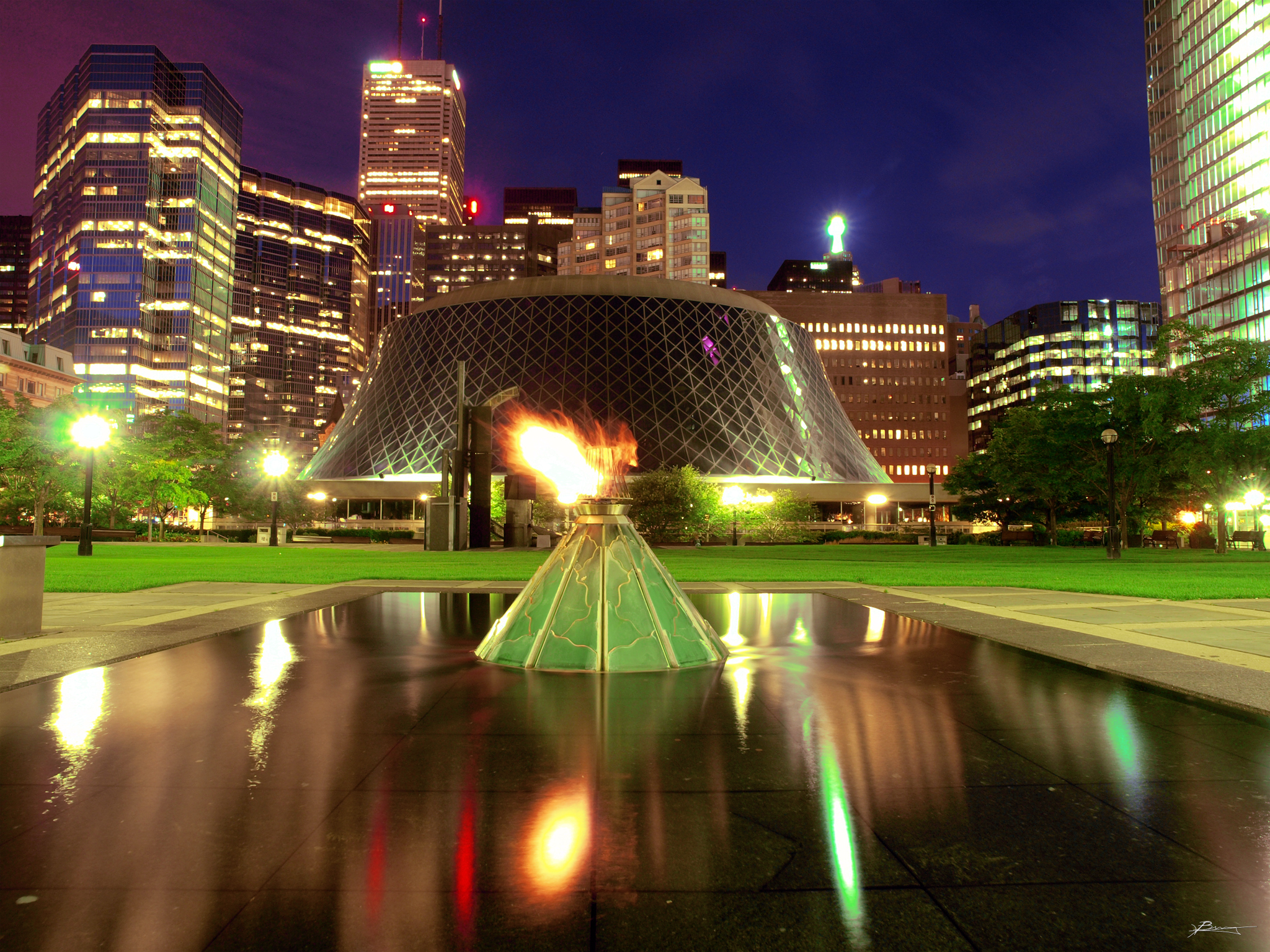
- Looking east to Roy Thomson Hall with the eternal flame and The Poet, The Fever Hospital in view.
- Features: Reflecting pool
- Opened: 1992
- Surface: concrete, grass
- Dedicated to: David Pecaut
- Owner: City of Toronto
- Location: King Street at John Street; Toronto, Ontario, Canada
- Location of David Pecaut Square in Toronto
- Coordinates: 43°38′47″N 79°23′14″W

David Pecaut Square (formerly known as Metro Square) is a large concrete-and granite-clad plaza located in front of Metro Hall in Toronto, Ontario, Canada. The square supports the PATH network connection between Metro Hall and nearby buildings such as Metro Centre. Glass pavilions provide access to the PATH network.

== History ==
David Pecaut Square was built as part of Toronto's postmodern Metro Hall project, meant to house the government of the Municipality of Metropolitan Toronto, which existed from 1954 to 1998. The agreement to build Metro Hall was signed in 1988, and the project was completed in 1992. The plaza was formerly known as Metro Square but was renamed in April 2011 by a unanimous Toronto City Council vote to honour the late civic leader David Pecaut.

== Culture and amenities ==
The public space features Canadian sculptor Bernie Miller's The Poet, The Fever Hospital, a 1992 piece made up of galvanized steel, bronze, granite, and marble. The sculpture incorporates a fountain and reflecting pool. The title refers to the poet Isabella Valancy Crawford, who stayed for a brief time in a house that was demolished for the construction of Metro Hall at the southeast corner of King and John Streets. The fever hospital refers to one of Toronto's first hospitals, which stood at the northeast corner of King and John Streets from 1829 to 1856. Sheltered by a large granite wall, four bronze boxes evoking television monitors stacked nearly 5 metres high form a fountain. The water flows into a marble basin and into the reflecting pool. The boxes are framed with a semi-circular steel beam, perforated with small holes and mounted at a gentle tilt. The reflecting pool also contains the Eternal Flame of Hope, an eternal flame fueled by natural gas, unveiled in 1996. The Eternal Flame of Hope is inspired by the perseverance of disabled people, and burns as a reminder that society must be all-inclusive.

Also located at the southwestern part of the square is Jaan Poldaas' Surface Design for Tampered Windscreens (1992), a sculpture composed of tempered glass screens which functions as a windbreak. The screens are etched with vertical and horizontal lines to create different relationships, and are arranged so that people can walk between them.

Cynthia Short's Remembered Sustenance (1992) is piece composed of 19 small and generic bronze animals on the grass just off the sidewalk on Wellington Street West. Half the animals appear to be headed for a bronze feeding dish while the other half seem to be walking away.

David Pecaut Square also has a lawn and trees along its outer edges. The public space allows for views of Metro Hall, Roy Thomson Hall and the Royal Alexandra Theatre. It is frequently used for free concerts, film screenings, and other events; for the state funeral of Jack Layton on August 27, 2011, the square was used to accommodate a screening for overflow crowds not able to be seated inside Roy Thomson Hall.

== See also ==
- Albert Campbell Square
- Nathan Phillips Square
- Sankofa Square
