= Scarborough Civic Centre =

Civic building in Ontario, Canada

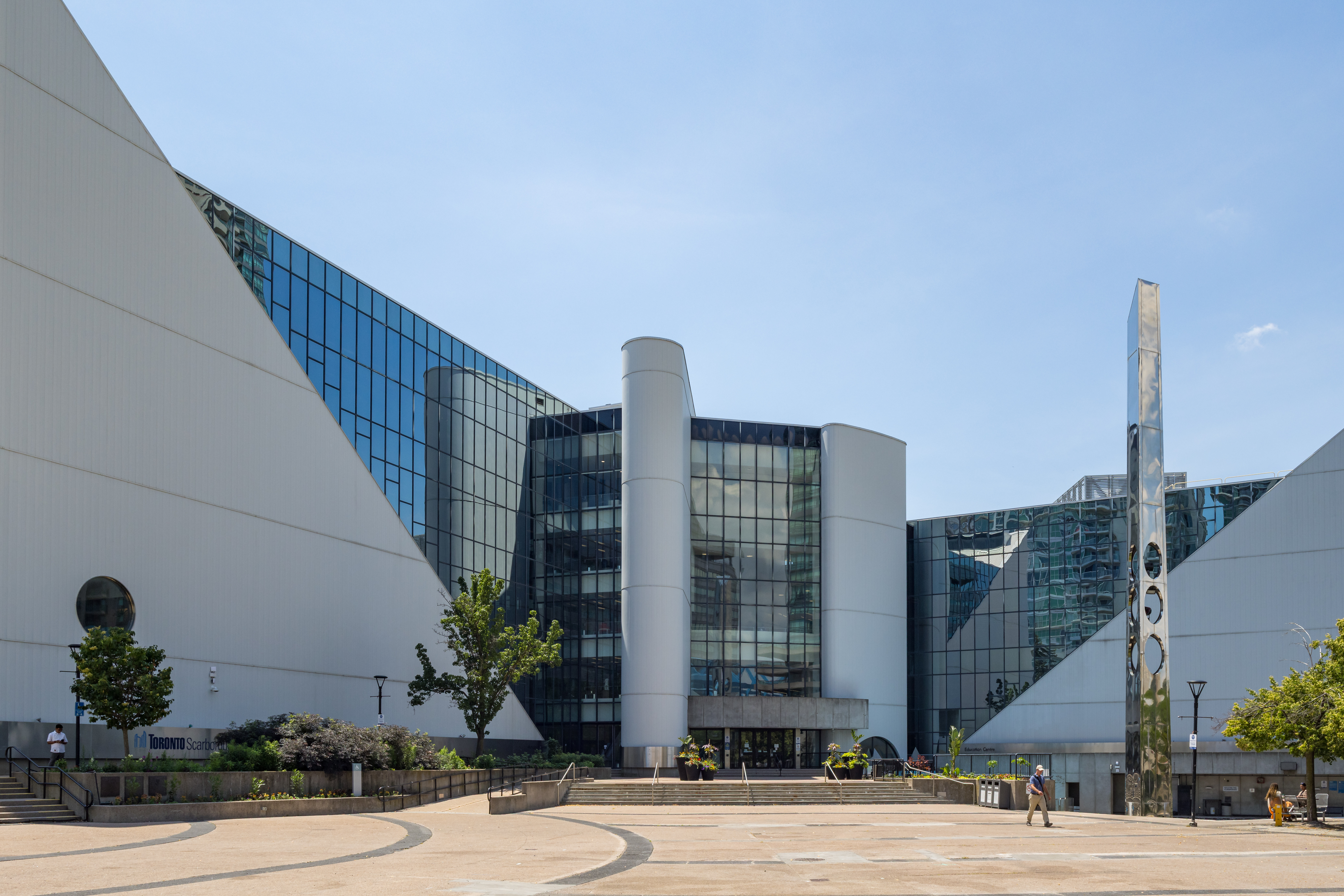
- Scarborough Civic Centre in 2026

General information
- Location: 150 Borough Drive; Toronto, Ontario; M1P 4N7
- Coordinates: 43°46′22″N 79°15′27″W
- Current tenants: City of Toronto
- Inaugurated: 1973
- Owner: City of Toronto

Technical details
- Floor count: 5 (east wing); 4 (west wing)

Design and construction
- Architect: Raymond Moriyama

The Scarborough Civic Centre is a civic centre located in the Scarborough district of Toronto, Ontario, Canada. It was designed by architect Raymond Moriyama during the development of Scarborough City Centre and initially opened as the city hall of the former borough of Scarborough by then mayor Albert Campbell and Queen Elizabeth II in 1973. The building served as the municipal office and office for the Scarborough Board of Education. Following the amalgamation of Toronto, Scarborough lost its city status and the civic centre became a secondary hub for the City of Toronto government. It is also home to the Scarborough Community Council and offices of the Toronto District School Board.

The civic centre is adjacent to Albert Campbell Square. It is south of Scarborough Centre station and the Scarborough Town Centre shopping mall.

== Structure and surroundings ==
The building is unique for the juxtaposition of two triangular-shaped, multiple split-level towers, which surround an open central area in the interior. Outside the Civic Centre on the north side is Albert Campbell Square, named after Albert Campbell, Scarborough's first mayor, with a waterfall and reflecting pool, used as a skating rink in winter.

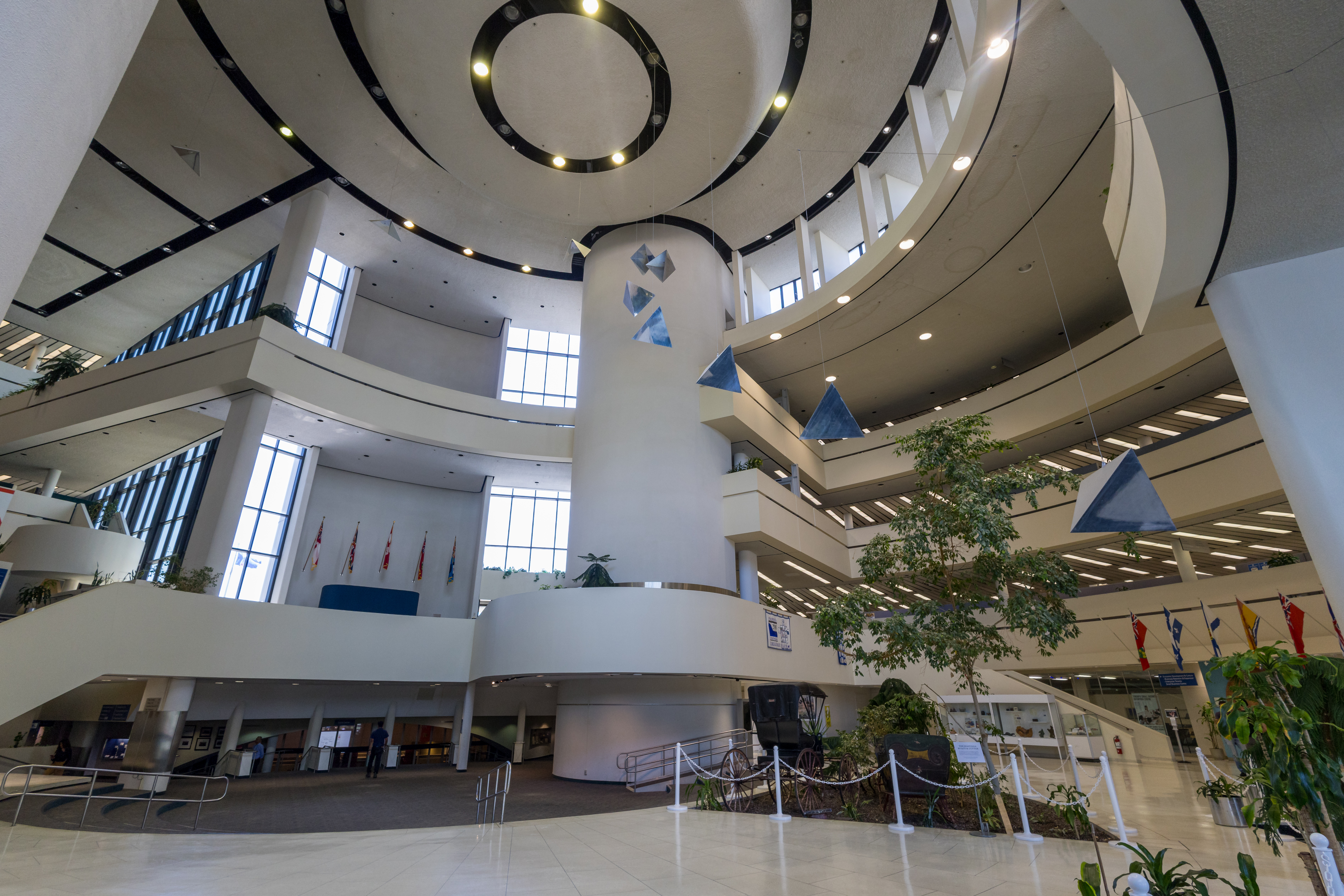
Interior atrium

Sculptures are found on the southwest side of the building. The Hand of God, dedicated to Albert Campbell, depicts a man held up by a hand and is mounted on a mast; it is located south across Borough Drive. Gord Smith's Icarus portrays bronze folds assembled together to represent a pair of outstretched wings. Frank Faubert Forest, a wooded area south of the Civic Centre is named for Scarborough's last mayor, Frank Faubert. Inside the main hall is a rising series of polished metal unfolding tetrahedrons resembling birds rising toward the ceiling from the main-floor-level pond, designed by Toronto artist James Sutherland in 1972.

In 2015, the Toronto Public Library opened the Scarborough Civic Centre branch, its 100th library branch. The Toronto Public Library Scarborough Civic Centre branch was designed by Toronto-based architecture firm LGA Architectural Partners with Philip H. Carter as planning consultant.

== See also ==
- East York Civic Centre
- Etobicoke Civic Centre
- York Civic Centre
- North York Civic Centre
- Metro Hall
- Toronto City Hall

== Notes ==
Preceded by Scarborough Municipal Building - Eglinton Avenue near Birchmount Road	Scarborough City Hall; 1973–1997	Succeeded by Toronto City Hall
