= Metro Hall =

Office building in Toronto, Ontario, Canada

Coordinates: 43°38′46″N 79°23′18″W

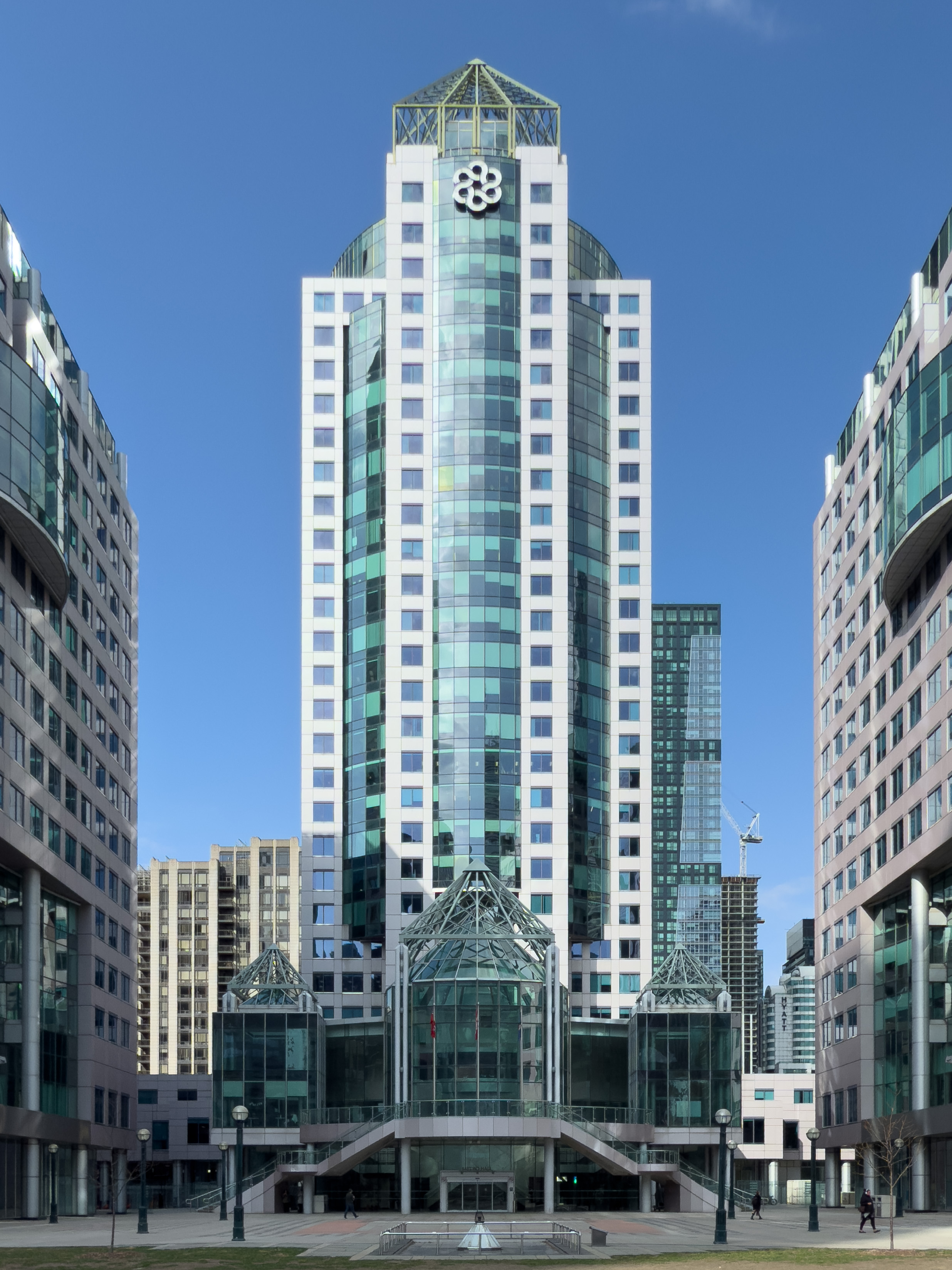
- Metro Hall as seen from Pecaut Square.

General information
- Architectural style: Postmodern
- Location: 55 John Street; Toronto, Ontario; M5V 3C6
- Completed: 1992
- Owner: City of Toronto

Technical details
- Floor count: 27

Ontario Heritage Act
- Official name: Metro Hall Council Chambers
- Designated: July 2006

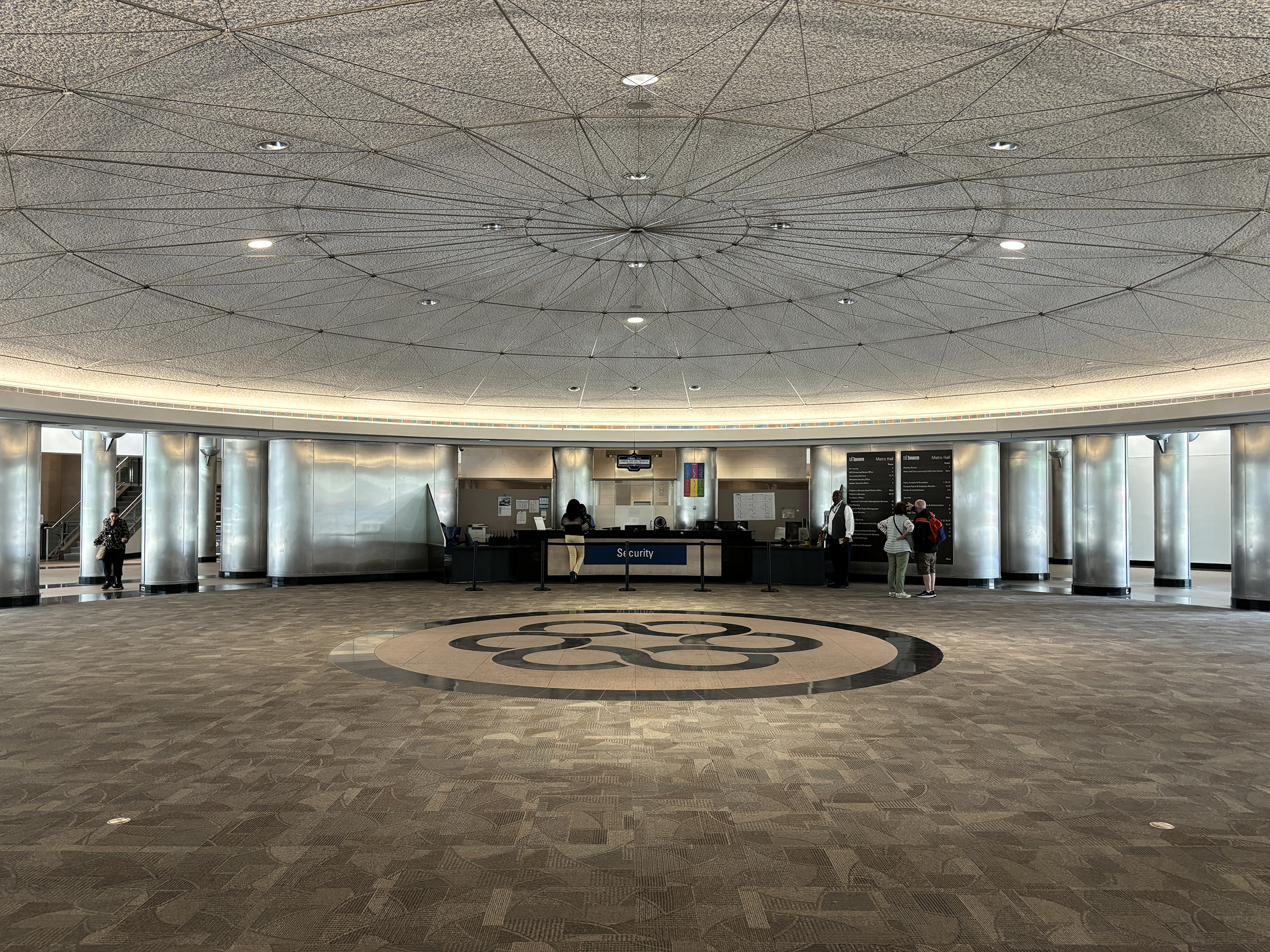
Lobby of Metro Hall

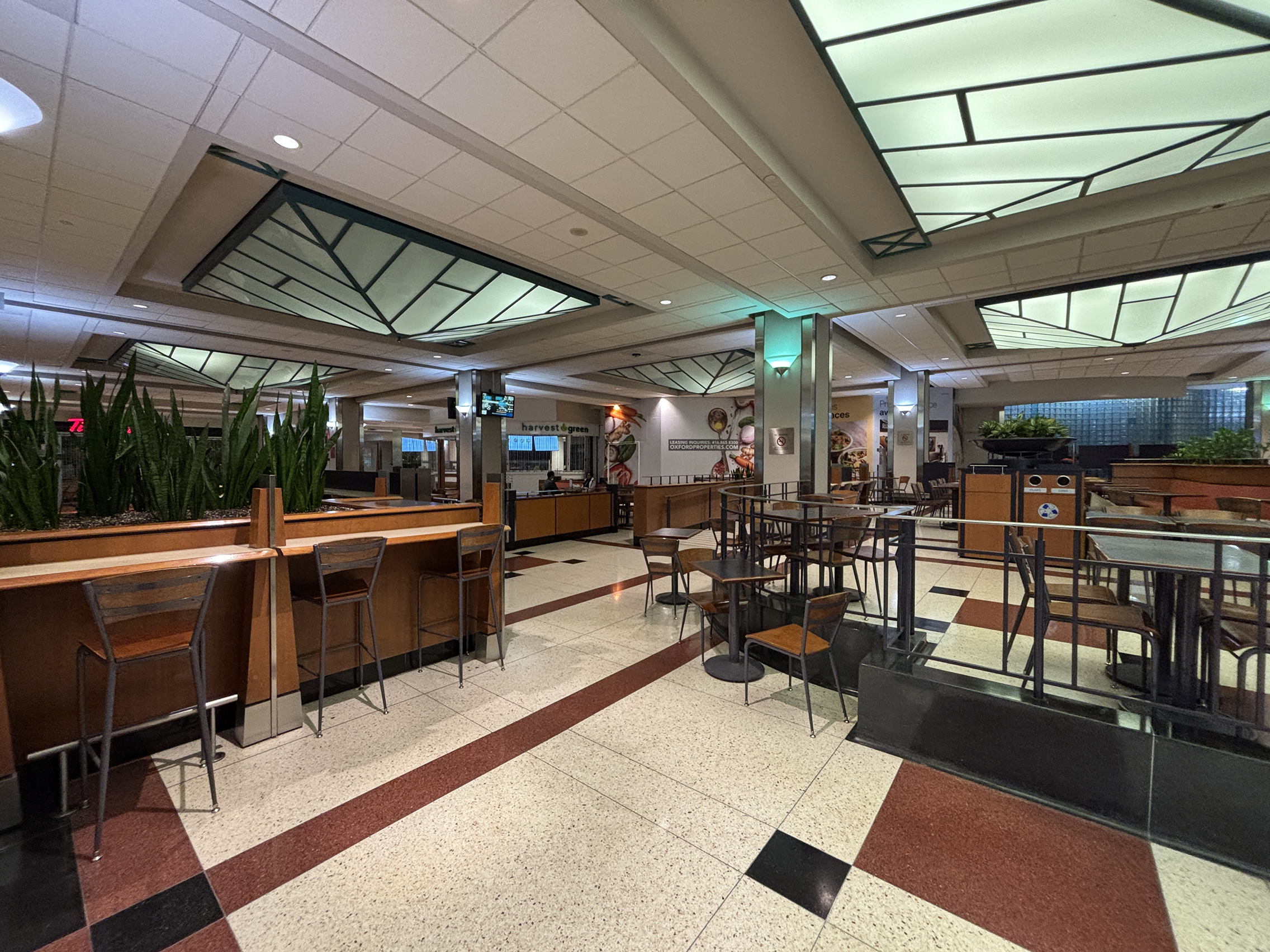
Food Court in PATH underground walkway system

Metro Hall is a 27-storey Postmodern-style office tower at the corner of Wellington and John Street in the downtown core of Toronto, Ontario, Canada. It looks out onto Pecaut Square. Part of the three-tower Metro Centre complex, the building was completed in 1992 to house the Municipality of Metropolitan Toronto (Metro) and its employees. The building is now used by the City of Toronto following municipal consolidation in 1998.

== History ==
Following Metro's inception in 1954, its politicians and employees were scattered in more than a dozen buildings around Toronto. When the new Toronto City Hall originally opened in 1964, one of its twin towers was intended for Metro Toronto offices and the other for the City of Toronto; the two councils shared the central council chamber. Eventually this space proved inadequate and committee facilities and councillors' offices were relocated to 390 Bay Street, across from City Hall; Metro Council continued to meet in the City Hall council chamber.

Two proposals for a new hall exclusively for Metro use were shortlisted. The proposal by CN called for a building adjacent to the SkyDome (now the Rogers Centre). The winning proposal by Marathon Realty was a cluster of three towers looking down on Roy Thomson Hall. It was built to the west of downtown in the former industrial area that saw a number of major developments around the same time.

The plan was not without controversy. The massive structure cost approximately $211 million, which many felt could be better spent. Then-North York mayor Mel Lastman harshly criticized Metro Council's decision to locate the building downtown, arguing that it would be more equitable and much cheaper to build the headquarters in the suburbs. Proponents of the plan claimed that the building would save money in the long term due to savings on rent, which by 1987 was estimated to have reached $7 million per year.

The agreement to build the new hall was signed in 1988, and the building was completed in 1992. It was linked to the PATH underground walkway system, stretching the underground walkway system further west. Only the main building housed Metro employees with the two smaller structures rented out by Marathon to private companies. Pecaut Square, a large public square between the buildings, was completed as part of the Metro Hall project. It was formerly known as Metro Square, but in April 2011, Toronto City Council voted unanimously to rename the public space after the late civic leader David Pecaut. The lower level of the main building contains other amenities such as a community centre and library.

In 1998 the Metro level of government was merged with the city governments, and it was decided that the new city would be headquartered at Toronto's iconic City Hall. Metro Hall was nonetheless used temporarily while City Hall was refitted to accommodate the large number of councillors. The empty council chamber was used as a temporary homeless shelter in 1999 at the behest of then city councillor Jack Layton, and was converted to a 3-1-1 call centre in 2007.

There was some talk of selling Metro Hall, but it remains in use for many municipal employees. In 2001, the city government asked for bids, but the highest received was $125 million, far lower than the facility had cost. Metro Hall was used for filming in the Left Behind films as the U.N. building, or Global Community Headquarters. It was also used for many television shows including an episode of 1-800-Missing. A scene from the 2010 film Saw 3D, involving a public trap, was filmed at Pecaut Square.

Metro Hall Council Chambers inside the building have been protected under Part IV of the Ontario Heritage Act, since July 2006. The designation notes that the architects are Brisbin Brook Beynon Architects. The by-law notes: "The exterior of Metro Hall and the interiors apart from the Council Chambers are not included in the Reasons for Designation".

== See also ==
- East York Civic Centre
- Etobicoke Civic Centre
- Scarborough Civic Centre
- York Civic Centre
- North York Civic Centre
- Toronto City Hall
- Mel Lastman Square
- Albert Campbell Square
- Nathan Phillips Square

Preceded by Toronto City Hall	Seat of the Government of Metro Toronto; 1992–1997	Succeeded by none
