= East York Civic Centre =

Coordinates: 43°41′28.5″N 79°19′42″W

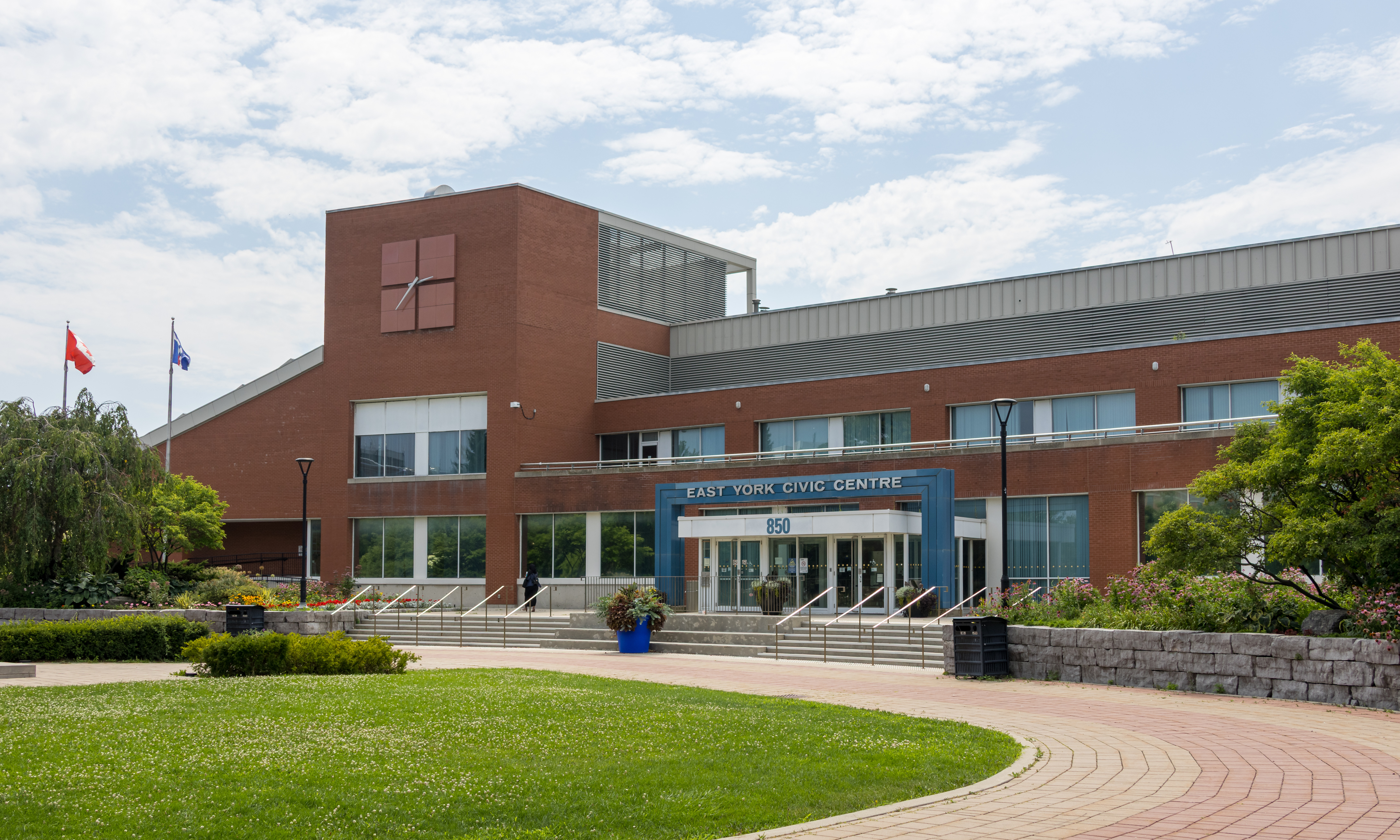
- Civic Centre in 2026
- Interactive map of the East York Civic Centre area

General information
- Type: civic
- Architectural style: postmodern
- Location: 850 Coxwell Avenue; Toronto, Ontario; M4C 5R1
- Inaugurated: 1990
- Owner: City of Toronto

Technical details
- Floor count: 2

The East York Civic Centre was the municipal office of the former borough of East York, now part of Toronto, Ontario, Canada as the result of municipal amalgamation. The two-storey civic building, located on the western side of Coxwell Avenue, was completed in 1990. Prior to 1990 it was the site of the East York Municipal Offices built in 1948, additions added in 1963 and 1975. The Township of East York Municipal Building was located nearby at 443 Sammon Avenue (replaced by St. Aloysius Catholic Elementary School 1962-2002 now as École élémentaire La Mosaïque).

Since 1998, the building's former council chambers have not been used for any municipal-council function. The East York Community Council became the Downtown Community Council (later renamed Toronto East York Community Council) and sits at Toronto City Hall. From 2002 to 2005, the council chambers were used to hold public hearings in the Toronto Computer Leasing Inquiry. The former chambers is rectangular room with a semi-circular desk seating 11 members and small second floor visitor's gallery, named the True Davidson Chambers after former mayor True Davidson.

The building is used for offices for various committees and city departments including services for residents of East York. A farmer's market takes place at the Civic Centre from May to November. A cenotaph is located on the Civic Centre's Memorial Gardens, a simple park surrounding the building.

== See also ==
- North York Civic Centre
- Etobicoke Civic Centre
- Scarborough Civic Centre
- York Civic Centre
- Metro Hall
- Toronto City Hall

Preceded by N/A	East York Civic Centre; 1990–1997	Succeeded by Toronto City Hall
