= Etobicoke Civic Centre =

Civic building in Toronto, Canada

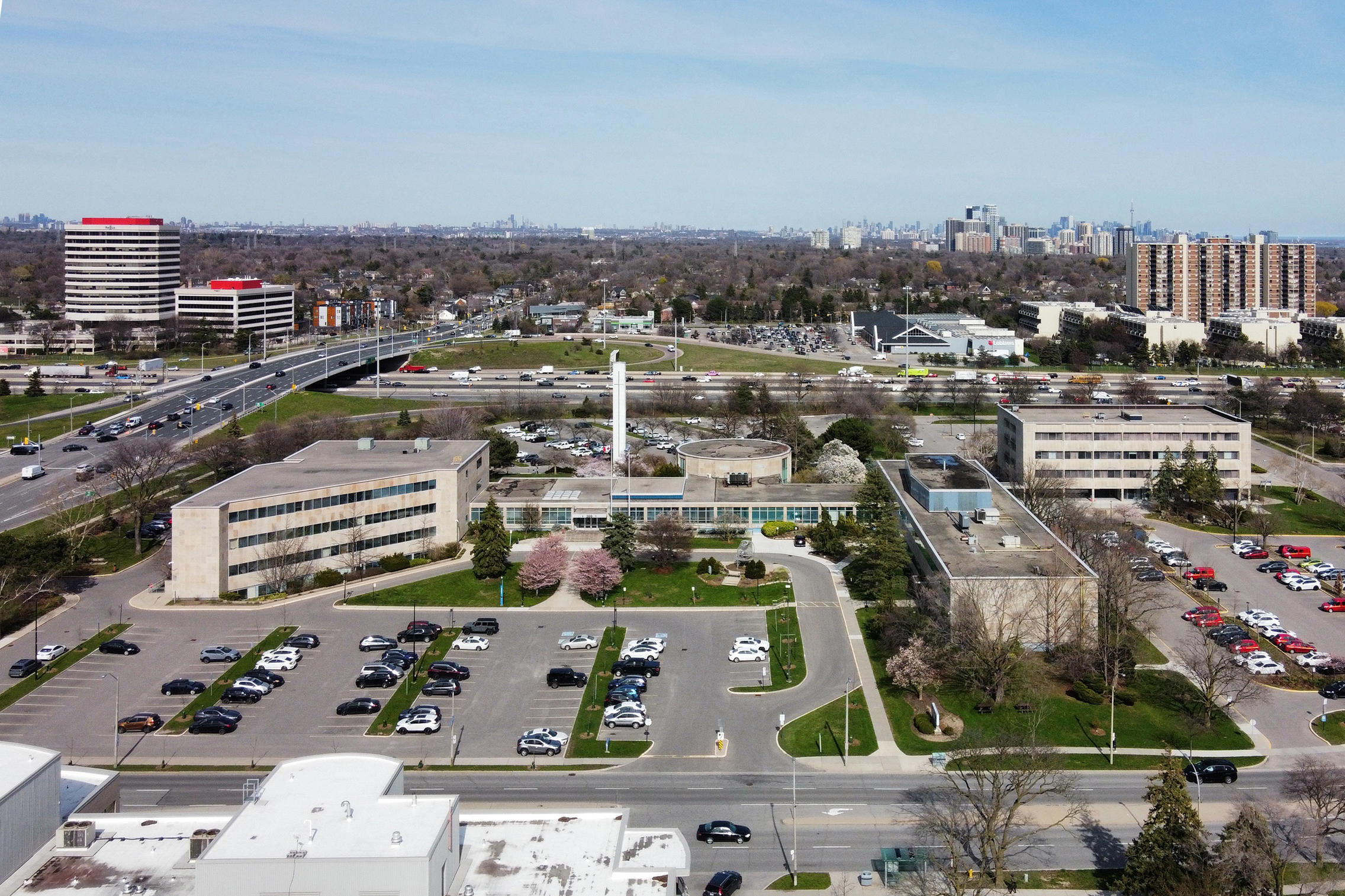
- Interactive map of the Etobicoke Civic Centre area

General information
- Location: 399 The West Mall; Toronto, Ontario; M9C 2Y2
- Coordinates: 43°38′38″N 79°33′56″W
- Construction started: 1956
- Completed: 1958
- Inaugurated: September 23, 1958
- Owner: City of Toronto

Technical details
- Floor count: 1

Design and construction
- Architecture firm: Shore and Moffat (Robert Reid Moffat and Leonard Shore)

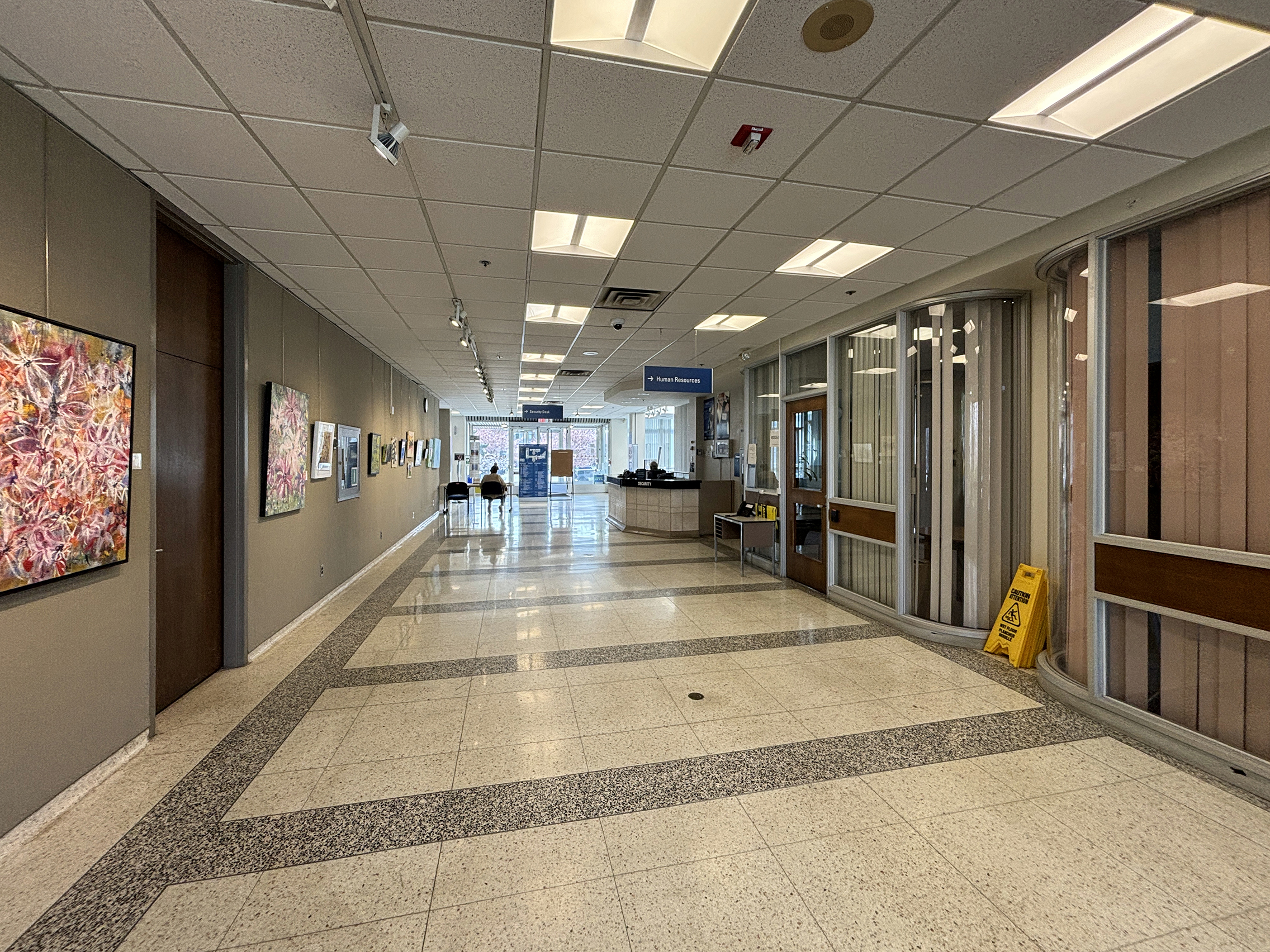
Interior of the building

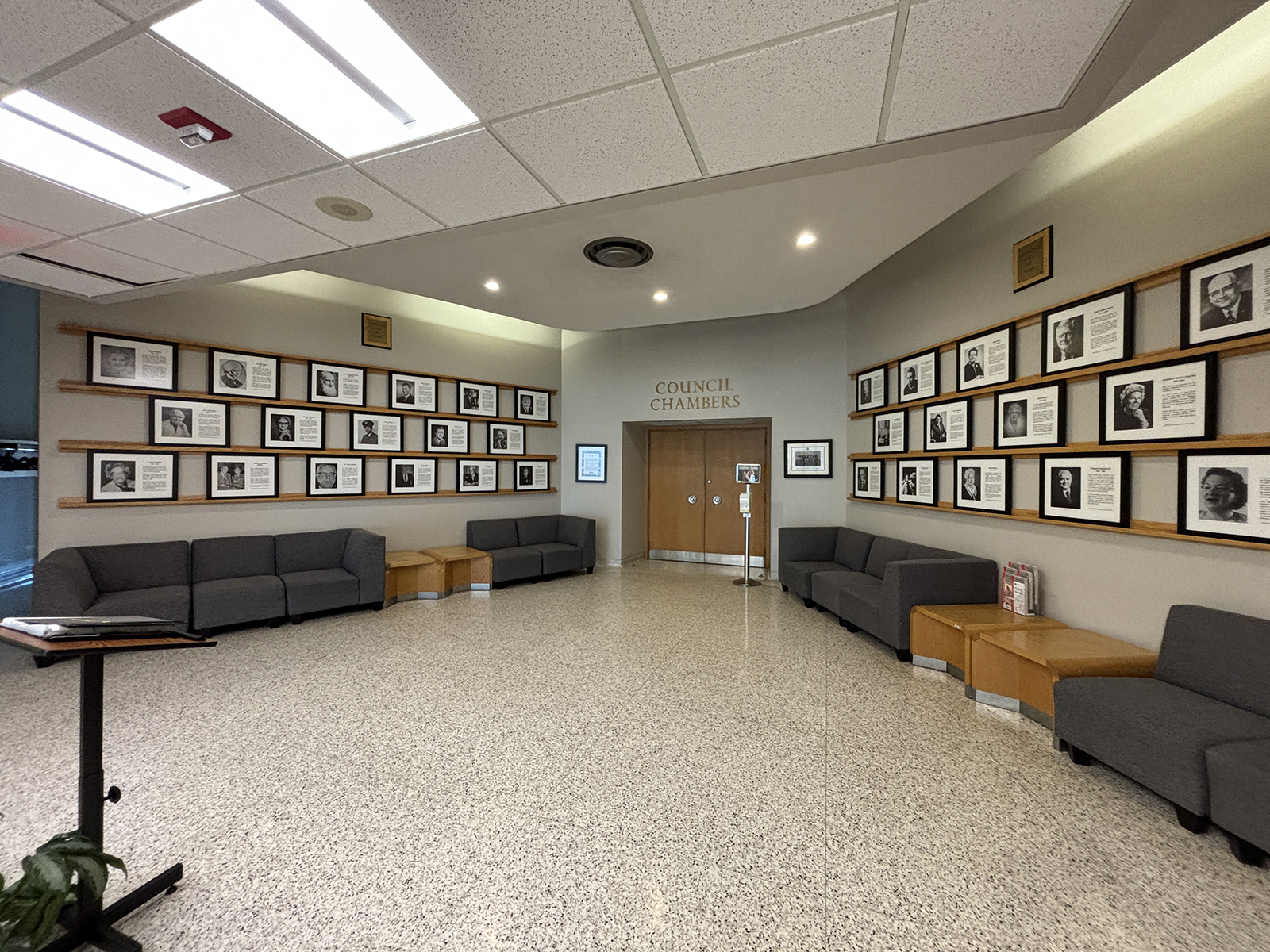
Champer Entrance

The Etobicoke Civic Centre in the Eatonville neighbourhood of Toronto, Ontario, Canada, once housed the municipal government of the former City of Etobicoke.

The building was built in 1958 by the firm Shore and Moffat to replace the single storey brick Township of Etobicoke Municipal Hall at 4946 Dundas Street (now Fox and a Fiddle pub). The building exterior is clad in Queenston limestone and framed by glass and aluminum. The original building also features a clock tower with a non-numeric clock face.

A limestone cenotaph (War Memorial - Etobicoke Municipal Centre) was constructed in 1968 in memory of those who gave their lives in World War I (1914 - 1918), World War II (1939 - 1945), and the Korean War (1950 - 1953). The original plan was to convert the clock tower as a cenotaph. The war dates are located on a metal plaque and above it a large metal cross. Adjacent to the Cenotaph, a provincial plaque commemorating Corporal Frederick George Topham, V.C., an Etobicoke war Hero was erected in 1980. The Board of Education (1 City Centre Court) and Ontario Hydro (South Block) built structures next to the Civic Centre, the former was acquired by Etobicoke for civic use in 1969. In 1973 an addition was added to the original by the same architectural firm.

Etobicoke was amalgamated into the City of Toronto in 1998, and the building no longer serves as a city hall and retained for use for City of Toronto use.

Located on The West Mall in central Etobicoke, the building is used as a meeting place for the Etobicoke community council, a committee of councillors representing wards in the area that makes recommendations on local matters to the full city council. The building also houses a number of local municipal departments and services. A farmers' market operates from spring to fall yearly. An ornamental pool and square was removed during renovations, so the current civic centre lacks any formal public space; it is surrounded by other buildings and parking lots with some trees and patches of lawns. The historic 'Applewood' Shaver House across the street is used for weddings.

== Coat of Arms ==
In 2023, staff voted to remove the coat of arms from the building. This was done to improve relations with Indigenous communities in Toronto. The removal has been criticized by councilor Stephen Holyday.

== Vandalism ==
A lone male entered the Civic Centre and caused damages to the building exterior and interior as well as City vehicles on March 28 or 29, 2016.

== Farmers Market ==
A seasonal farmers market is open on Saturdays from early June to late October in the parking area of the Civic Centre.

Vendors from the Greater Toronto Area and Southern Ontario sell fresh produce, eggs, meat and bread. It is one of 5 farmers markets in Etobicoke:

- Sherway Gardens Farmers Market at Church on the Queensway - every Friday from early June to late October
- Stonegate Farmers Market at Christ Church St. James Anglican on Park Lawn Road -every Tuesday from late June to early October
- Montgomery's Inn Farmers Market - every Wednesday year round
- Humber Bay Shores Condominium Association Farmers Market at Humber Bay Park West - every Saturday from late May to early October

== See also ==
- East York Civic Centre
- North York Civic Centre
- Scarborough Civic Centre
- York Civic Centre
- Metro Hall
- Toronto City Hall

== Relocation ==
Plans are in the works to relocated the Civic Centre from the current location to the site of the vacant Westwood Theatre at Dundas Street West and Kipling Avenue. The new site required the re-construction of the current intersection at Six Points, which completed in 2020.

The new location will house city offices as well as:

- recreation centre
- public library
- child care centre
- central civic square

Preceded by Township of Etobicoke Municipal Hall (c. 1927)	Etobicoke Civic Centre; 1958–1997	Succeeded by Toronto City Hall
