= York Civic Centre =

Coordinates: 43.689848°N 79.478491°W

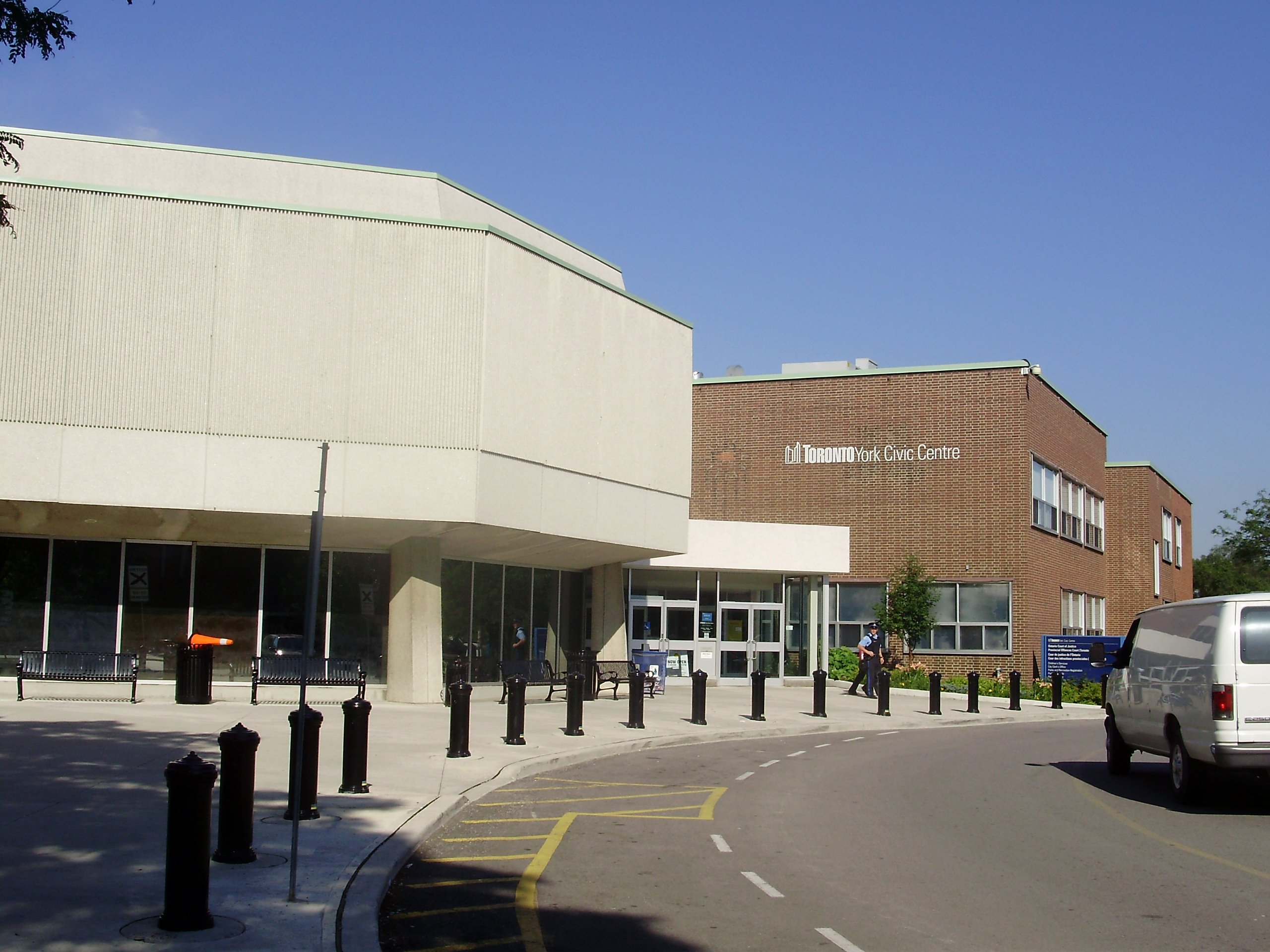

General information
- Type: Civic
- Architectural style: Postmodern
- Location: Toronto, Ontario, Canada, 2700 Eglinton Avenue West
- Current tenants: City of Toronto
- Completed: 1949
- Owner: City of Toronto

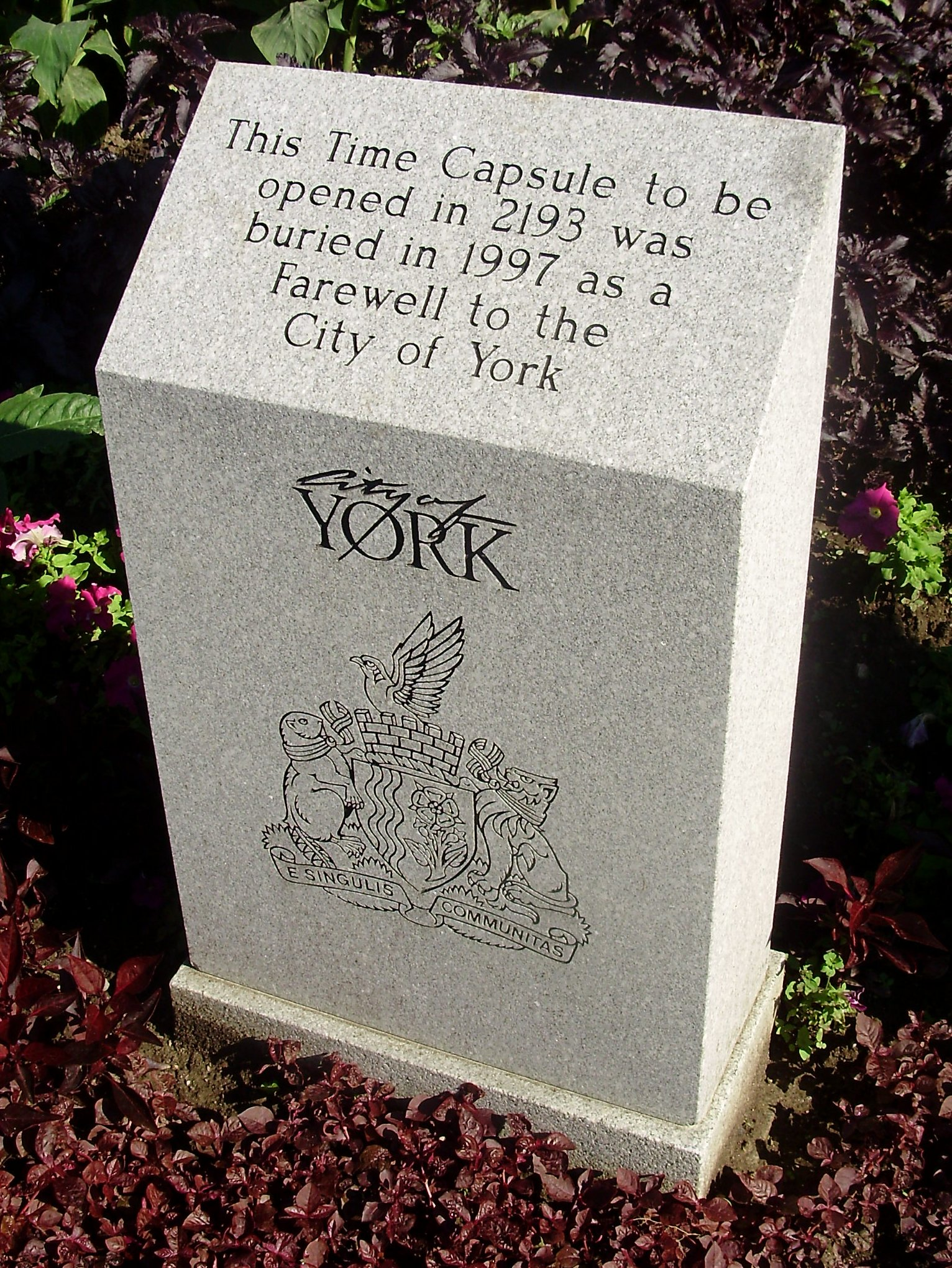
This time capsule is intended to be sealed for one hundred and ninety-six years.

The York Civic Centre is a government building in Toronto, Ontario, Canada. It is located at 2700 Eglinton Avenue West in the neighbourhood of Beechborough-Greenbrook. The building is used by the Toronto West Court Office and was the seat of the municipal government of the former city of York, Ontario. It was built in 1949, with additions completed in 1962 and 1974.

York Civic Centre does not have a public square like several other civic centres in Toronto, but is located next to Coronation Park and York Memorial Collegiate Institute. There is a time capsule present on the grounds, adjacent to the city of York's war memorial. It is intended to be opened in 2193, Toronto's quadricentennial anniversary.

== See also ==
- East York Civic Centre
- Etobicoke Civic Centre
- Scarborough Civic Centre
- North York Civic Centre
- Metro Hall
- Toronto City Hall

Preceded by N/A	York Civic Centre ?–1997	Succeeded by Toronto City Hall
