= Broadway =

Broadway may refer to:

== Theatre ==
- Broadway Theatre (disambiguation)
  - Broadway theatre, theatrical productions in professional theatres near Broadway, Manhattan, New York City, U.S.

== Other arts, entertainment, and media ==
=== Films ===
- Broadway (1929 film), based on the play by George Abbott and Philip Dunning
- Broadway (1942 film), with George Raft, Pat O'Brien, Janet Blair and Broderick Crawford

=== Music ===
==== Groups and labels ====
- Broadway (band), an American post-hardcore band
- Broadway (disco band), an American disco band from the 1970s
- Broadway Records (disambiguation)

==== Albums ====
- Broadway (album), a 1964 Johnny Mathis album released in 2012
- Broadway, 2011, by Kika Edgar

==== Songs ====
- "Broadway" (Goo Goo Dolls song), from Dizzy Up the Girl (1998)
- "Broadway" (Sébastien Tellier song), by Sébastien Tellier from his album Politics (2004)
- "Broadway" (1940 song), a 1940 jazz standard by Billy Byrd, Teddy McRae and Henri Woode
- "Broadway", by the Clash from Sandinista! (1980)
- "Broadway", performed by Alison Krauss on Now That I've Found You: A Collection (1995)
- "Broadway", performed by Old 97's on their album Too Far to Care (1997)
- "Broadway (So Many People)", by Low from The Great Destroyer (2005)
- "Broadway (Do You Remember)", by Jimmy Fallon from Holiday Seasoning (2024)

=== Television ===
- Broadway (gargoyle), a character in the animated television series Gargoyles
- "Broadway" (The Architecture the Railways Built), a 2020 television episode

=== Other uses in other arts, entertainment, and media ===
- Broadway Journal, magazine owned, edited, and featuring work by Edgar Allan Poe
- Broadway (play), 1926, written and directed by George Abbott and Philip Dunning
- "Broadway", a poker term for a straight from ace to 10

== Businesses and organizations ==
=== Australia ===
- Broadway on the Mall, former shopping centre in Brisbane, Queensland
- Broadway Shopping Centre, Sydney, New South Wales

=== Hong Kong ===
- Broadway Circuit, a cinema chain in Hong Kong
  - Broadway Cinematheque

=== Philippines ===
- GMA Broadway Centrum, a TV studio, New Manila, Quezon City

=== United Kingdom ===
- Broadway Cinema, Nottingham
- Broadway Shopping Centre, Bexleyheath, London
- The Broadway, Bradford, England, a shopping centre

=== United States ===
- Broadway at the Beach, shopping center and entertainment complex, Myrtle Beach, South Carolina
- Broadway Books, publisher
- Broadway Tower (San Antonio), a high-rise condominium tower in San Antonio, Texas
- Broadway Video, an American multimedia company that produces Saturday Night Live
- The Broadway, a former department store chain owned by Carter Hawley Hale Stores
- Navy Broadway Complex, a military facility in downtown San Diego, California

== People ==
- Broadway Jones (baseball player) (1898–1977), American pitcher in Major League Baseball
- Broadway Jones (performer) (1888–1948), American singer, comedian, band leader, jazz musician, and musical theatre actor
- Allan Broadway (1921–1997), Australian rules footballer in the Victorian Football League
- Christine Broadway, Australian actress
- Geoff Broadway (1911–1978), New Zealand former middle-distance runner
- Lance Broadway (1983–2026), American actor and former Major League Baseball pitcher
- Lizze Broadway, American actress
- Remi Broadway (born 1978), Australian actor
- Rod Broadway (born 1955), American football coach
- Shane Broadway (born 1972), American politician
- Tony Broadway, a ring name of an American professional wrestler James Maritato (born 1972)
- Broadway Rose, nickname of several members of the Gorgeous Ladies of Wrestling

== Places ==
=== Municipalities ===
==== Canada ====
- Broadway (electoral district), Manitoba
- Broadway, Nova Scotia

==== United Kingdom ====
- Broadway, London, City of Westminster, England
- Broadway, Somerset, England
- Broadway, The Havens, Pembrokeshire, Wales
- Broadway, Worcestershire, England
- Broadwey, Weymouth, England

==== United States ====
- Broadway, Missouri
- Broadway, Newark, New Jersey
- Broadway, New Jersey, within Franklin Township
- Broadway, North Carolina
- Broadway, Ohio
- Broadway, Virginia

==== Other places ====
- Broadway, New South Wales (Upper Lachlan), Australia
- Broadway, County Wexford, Ireland, a village
- Broadway, Durban, South Africa

=== Roads ===
==== Canada ====
- Broadway Avenue (Saskatoon), Saskatchewan
- Broadway (Vancouver), British Columbia
- Broadway (Winnipeg), Manitoba

==== United States ====
===== New York City =====
- Broadway (Brooklyn)
- Broadway (Manhattan), continuing into Bronx and Westchester counties
- Broadway (Queens)
- Broadway (Staten Island)

===== Elsewhere in the United States =====
- Broadway (Albany, New York)
- Broadway (Baltimore), Maryland
- Broadway (Chicago), Illinois
- Broadway (Cleveland), Ohio
- Broadway, Denver, Colorado
- Broadway (Everett), Washington
- Broadway (Gary), Indiana
- Broadway, Granville, Ohio
- Broadway (Laguna Beach), California
- Broadway Corridor, Long Beach, California
- Broadway (Los Angeles), California
- Broadway (Minot, North Dakota)
- Broadway (Nashville, Tennessee)
- Broadway, Phoenix and Tempe, Arizona
- Broadway (Portland, Oregon)
- Broadway (San Francisco), California
- Broadway (Seattle), Washington
- Broadway, San Antonio, Texas
- Broadway (Santa Maria), California
- Broadway, Santa Monica, California
- Broadway (Tampa), Florida
- Broadway Boulevard, Tucson, Arizona
- Broadway Avenue, Tyler, Texas
- Broadway, Burlingame, California
- Broadway, Dunedin, Florida

==== Other countries ====
- Broadway, Chennai, India
- Broadway, Kochi, India
- Broadway, Letchworth, Hertfordshire, England
- Broadway, Newmarket, New Zealand
- Broadway, Sydney, New South Wales, Australia
- Broadway Market, Hackney, London, England

== Transport ==
=== New York City lines and stations ===
- BMT Broadway Line, a New York City Subway line
- BMT Jamaica Line, also known as the Broadway Line, a New York City Subway line
- Broadway (IND Crosstown Line), a subway station, Williamsburg, Brooklyn
- Broadway (BMT Astoria Line), a subway station in Queens
- Broadway (BMT Myrtle Avenue Line), a disused New York City Subway station
- Broadway (LIRR station), a commuter rail station, Flushing, Queens
- Broadway Junction (New York City Subway), a subway station complex, Brooklyn
- IRT Broadway–Seventh Avenue Line, a New York City Subway line

=== Other uses in transport ===
- Broadway (cyclecar), a British four-wheeled cyclecar made only in 1913
- Broadway station (MBTA), a subway station in South Boston, Massachusetts, U.S.
- Broadway (NJT station), an NJ Transit train station on the Bergen County Line in Fair Lawn, New Jersey
- Broadway (PATCO station), a station in the Walter Rand Transportation Center in Camden, New Jersey
- Broadway (Sacramento RT), a light rail station in Sacramento, California, U.S.
- Broadway Limited, a former Pennsylvania Railroad passenger train between New York City and Chicago, U.S.
- Broadway railway station, a former Great Western Railway station under reconstruction, Worcestershire, England
- Broadway station (Caltrain) in Burlingame, California, U.S.
- Broadway station (Detroit), People Mover station in downtown Detroit, Michigan, U.S.
- Broadway Bus Terminus (Chennai), a bus terminus in downtown Chennai, Tamil Nadu, India
- Historic Broadway station, a light rail station in Downtown Los Angeles, California, U.S.
- HMS Broadway, a ship of the British Royal Navy
- Ealing Broadway station, a London Underground and National Rail station
- Fulham Broadway tube station, a London Underground station
- Tooting Broadway tube station, a London Underground station
- Renault Broadway, versions of the Renault 9 car
- Broadway Subway Project, an under-construction extension of the Millennium Line in Vancouver, Canada

== Other uses ==
- Broadway (microprocessor), code name of a computer chip in Nintendo's Wii gaming console
- Broadway (typeface), a decorative typeface
- Broadway, GTK+ computer software

== See also ==
- Broadway Academy, a secondary school and academy in Birmingham, England
- Broadway Bridge (disambiguation)
- Broadway Market (disambiguation)
- Broadway Rastus (disambiguation)
- Broadway Station (disambiguation)
- Old Broadway Synagogue, an Orthodox Jewish synagogue in New York City
- On Broadway (disambiguation)
