= Casino Theatre (Toronto) =

Theatre in Toronto, Ontario, Canada

Coordinates: 43.65185°N 79.38338°W

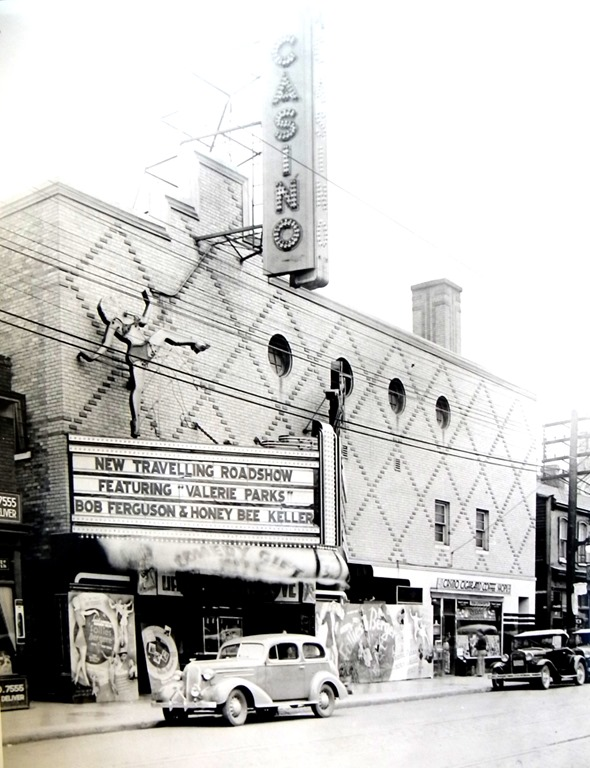
- Casino Theatre in the 1940s
- Interactive map of Casino Theatre
- Former names: Vaudeville Theatre
- Address: 87 Queen Street West; Toronto, Ontario, Canada
- Capacity: 1,120

Construction
- Opened: 1936
- Demolished: 1965
- Architect: Kaplan & Sprachman

The Casino Theatre was a live theatre, in Toronto, Ontario, Canada. It was located at 87 Queen Street West across the street from the current site of Nathan Phillips Square. Its repertoire of acts included vaudeville, music, film and burlesque.

The structure was designed by architects Kaplan & Sprachman, who designed 21 other theatres in Toronto, and 48 elsewhere in Canada. The theatre, then known as the Vaudeville Theatre opened in 1936 and was demolished in 1965. It seated almost 1,200 patrons.

The theatre hosted well-known performers, such as Johnny Rae, Patti Page, Gene Nelson, Pearl Bailey, Phil Silvers, Abbott and Costello, Nat King Cole, Sammy Davis Jr., Mickey Rooney, Frankie Laine, Sally Rand, Gypsy Rose Lee, Rose La Rose, Cup Cakes Cassidy, the Crewcuts, the Four Lads, Golden Gate Quartet, Billy Daniels and Rosemary Clooney.

The strippers, and bawdy comedians who performed at Casino made the Casino particularly subject to commentary and complaints. Doug Taylor, the author of Toronto Theaters and the Golden Age of the Silver Screen wrote that, "Other perhaps than the Victory Theatre on Spadina, there is no entertainment venue that elicited as much praise, raunchy stories, condemnation and press coverage as the infamous Casino Theatre." He described one high school principal staking out the theatre in order to catch students who were playing hookey to catch a show at the Casino.

Mike Filey, the Toronto Sun's historical columnist, noted that the theatre opened at one minute after midnight, April 13, 1936, a Monday, because conservative laws required the closure of venues that catered to pleasure, on Sundays. Filey suggested public complaints about the morals of the establishment were routinely ignored, since it was right across the street from City Hall, and many city councilors were regular patrons. Filey wrote that the Casino "offered every type of performance allowed by law, and some that weren't."

The three partners who founded the Casino were Jules Allen, and Jay Allen, and Murray Little, who already owned the Broadway Theatre, another burlesque theatre at 75 Queen Street West, a few doors to the east.

When the City of Toronto built its new civic square and Toronto City Hall in the 1960s, the south side of Queen Street West was not considered compatible with the project and was designated for redevelopment. City Council waited for private developers to buy the properties. The Casino owners did not want to sell and planned to clean up its repertoire and renamed itself "Civic Square Theatre" It changed to show legitimate live theatre but lost money, changed to foreign art films, continued to lose money and closed in August 1962. It reopened under the management of the Lux Theatre showing burlesque, changing the name back to Casino until 1964, when it returned to showing films. Mayor Philip Givens, who supported expropriation won the December 1964 election and City Council voted for expropriation. The theatre was eventually expropriated by the City and demolished in July 1965. The site eventually became a hotel.
