= Broadway station =

Broadway station may refer to:

== Canada ==
- Broadway–City Hall station, a rapid transit station in Vancouver, British Columbia
- Commercial–Broadway station, a rapid transit station in Vancouver, British Columbia, previously named Broadway station and Commercial Drive station

== United Kingdom ==
- Broadway railway station, a reconstructed station in Worcestershire
- Ealing Broadway station, a London Underground station serving the District and Piccadilly lines
- Fulham Broadway tube station, a London Underground station serving the District line
- Mill Hill Broadway railway station, a railway station in London
- Tooting Broadway tube station, a London Underground station serving the Northern line
- Broadway tram stop, a light rail stop in Manchester

== United States ==
- Broadway station (Caltrain), a commuter rail station in Burlingame, California
- Broadway station (Detroit), a people mover station in Detroit, Michigan
- Broadway station (LIRR), a commuter rail station in Queens, New York
- Broadway station (MBTA) a subway station in Boston, Massachusetts
- Broadway station (NJT), a commuter rail station in Fair Lawn, New Jersey
- Broadway station (PATCO), a commuter rail station in Camden, New Jersey
- Broadway station (Sacramento), a light rail station in Sacramento, California
- Broadway and The Embarcadero station, a light rail station in San Francisco, California
- Broadway Bus Terminal, in Paterson, New Jersey
- Historic Broadway station, a light rail station in Los Angeles, California
- I-25 & Broadway station, a light rail station in Denver, Colorado

=== New York City Subway ===
- Broadway (BMT Astoria Line) in Queens, serving the N and W trains
- Broadway (BMT Myrtle Avenue Line), a closed elevated station in Brooklyn
- Broadway (IND Crosstown Line) in Brooklyn, serving the G train
- Broadway Ferry (BMT Jamaica Line), a demolished elevated station in Brooklyn
- Broadway Junction (New York City Subway) a station complex in Brooklyn consisting of:
  - Broadway Junction (BMT Canarsie Line) serving the L train
  - Broadway Junction (IND Fulton Street Line) serving the A and C trains
  - Broadway Junction (BMT Jamaica Line) serving the J and Z trains
- Broadway–Lafayette Street (IND Sixth Avenue Line) in Manhattan, serving the B, D, F, <F>, and M trains
- East Broadway (IND Sixth Avenue Line) in Manhattan, serving the F and <F> train
- 74th Street-Broadway (IRT Flushing Line station) in Queens, serving the 7 train
- Canal Street (New York City Subway)#Bridge Line platforms (lower level), originally named Broadway

== Other ==
- Broadway bus terminus in Chennai, India
- Broadway's Best (radio station), a former satellite radio channel

== See also ==
- Broadway (disambiguation)
