= Broadway Junction =

Broadway Junction may refer to:

- Broadway Junction (New York City Subway), a station
- The Broadway roundabout in Belfast, Northern Ireland, location of RISE (sculpture)
- Broadway Junction (Brooklyn), a neighborhood of New York City

== See also ==
- Broadway Station (disambiguation)
- Broadway (disambiguation)
