= Curtis Park =

Curtis Park may refer to:

- Curtis Park, Sacramento, California, a neighborhood in Sacramento, California
- Curtis Park station, Sharon Hill, Philadelphia
