= J. C. Carly House =

Historic house in California, United States

- J.C. Carly House
- U.S. National Register of Historic Places
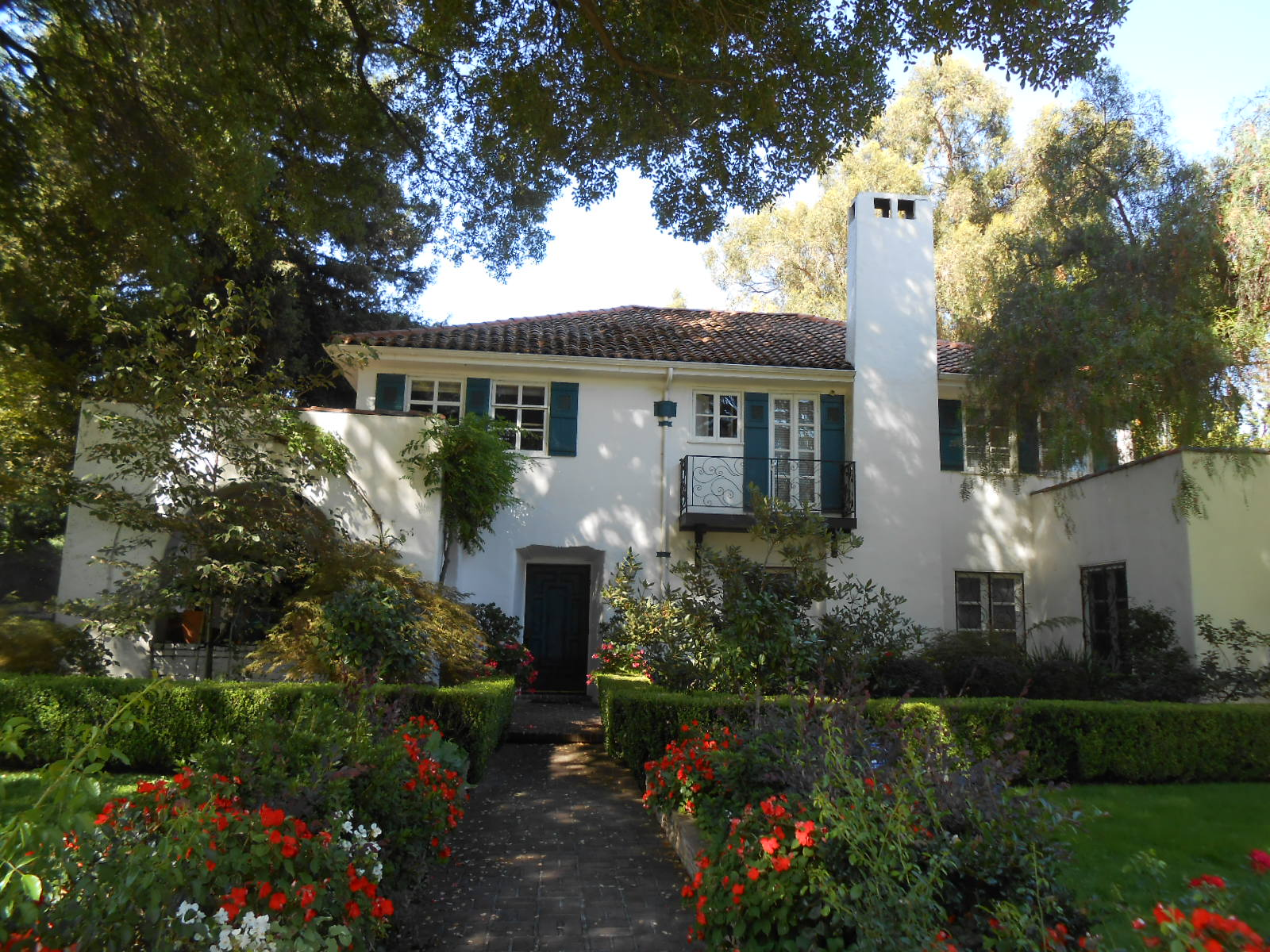

- Location within Sacramento, California Location within California Location within the United States
- Location: 2761 Montgomery Way, Sacramento, California
- Coordinates: 38°32′56″N 121°28′33″W
- Area: less than one acre
- Built: 1922
- Architect: Dean and Dean
- Architectural style: Mission/spanish Revival
- NRHP reference No.: 06000143
- Added to NRHP: March 22, 2006

The J. C. Carly House, listed on the National Register of Historic Places, is a historic home located in Curtis Park, Sacramento, California.

== History ==
James C. Carly was a wealthy real estate developer who owned much of the land that is now Curtis Park in Sacramento (named after rancher William Curtis). Built in one of the earliest suburbs of Sacramento, the Carly house was constructed in 1922. The area the home was built in what would become a center of post-World War I housing tracts. The architectural design was completed by Dean & Dean, locally known due to their work on the Sacramento Memorial Auditorium, Westminster Presbyterian Church, and the Sutter Club, among others. Carly's real estate dealings had a downturn during the Great Depression and he had to downgrade his living conditions, moving out in 1933. The home was later occupied by a local business owner until 1959.
