= 4th Avenue/Wayne Hultgren station =

Railway station in Sacramento, California

4th Avenue/Wayne Hultgren
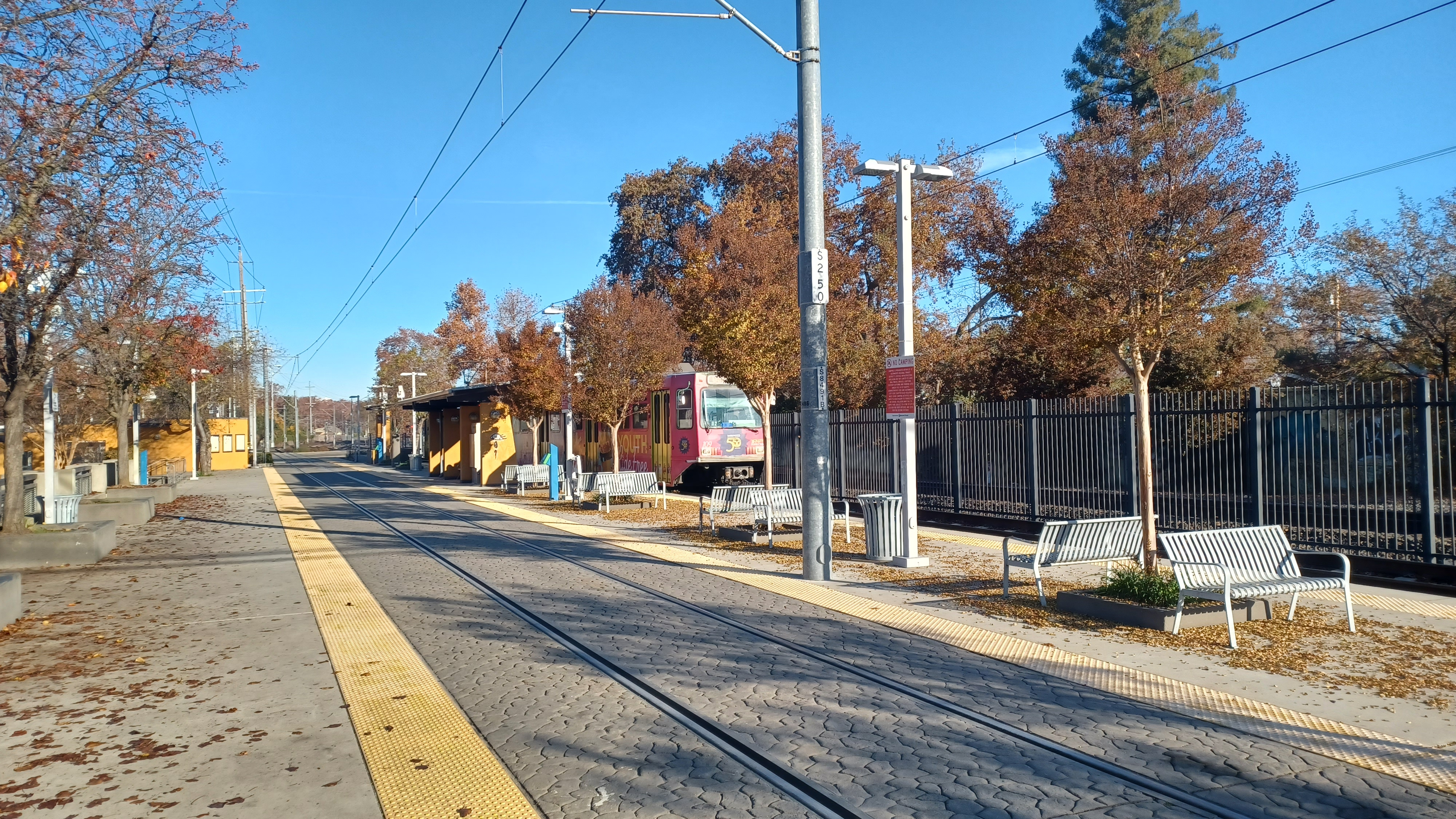
- Station platform in December 2024

General information
- Location: 4th Avenue at 21st Street; Sacramento, California; United States
- Coordinates: 38°33′5.34″N 121°29′17.38″W
- Owner: Sacramento Regional Transit District
- Platforms: 1 side platform, 1 island platform
- Tracks: 2
- Connections: Sacramento Regional Transit: 62

Construction
- Structure type: At-grade
- Accessible: Yes

History
- Opened: September 26, 2003

Services
Preceding station	SacRT	Following station
Broadway toward Watt/I-80	Blue Line	City College toward Cosumnes River College
Location

4th Avenue/Wayne Hultgren station is an at-grade light rail station on the Blue Line of the SacRT light rail system operated by the Sacramento Regional Transit District. The station is located in an exclusive right of way alongside the Union Pacific Railroad's Sacramento Subdivision at its intersection with 4th Avenue, after which the station is named, in the city of Sacramento, California.

It is located southeast of the 21st Street and Freeport Boulevard intersection, and serves the residential areas of Land Park and Curtis Park, commercial development along Freeport Boulevard, and C. K. McClatchy High School. The station is named in honor of Wayne Hultgren, a community activist who was essential in the establishment of light rail in Sacramento.

== Platforms and tracks ==
Like nearly all stations built as part of the Blue Line Southwest Extension, 4th Avenue/Wayne Hultgren station has a rather unique layout with an island platform serving northbound trains and a side platform boarding area for southbound trains, integrated into a small plaza that leads to the nearby bus stops. The southbound tracks are embedded in the pavement, allowing passengers to cross to the northbound platform from any point on the southbound platform. The layout is both efficient and a cost-effective way of providing a pedestrian-train interface.
