= Boadway =

Boadway may refer to:

== People ==
- Robin Boadway (born 1943), Canadian economist
- Steve Boadway (born 1963), American football player

== Other uses ==
- Boadway Bros., department store

== See also ==
- Broadway (disambiguation)
