= Broadway Market =

Broadway Market may refer to the following public markets:

- Broadway Market, Baltimore, Maryland, United States
- Broadway Market, Hackney, London, England, United Kingdom

== See also ==
- Broadway Market Building, North Carolina, United States
