= Broadway Theatre =

Broadway Theatre usually refers to:

- Broadway theatre, theatrical productions produced in a professional theater on or near Broadway in New York City

Broadway Theatre may also refer to:

== New York City ==
- Broadway Theatre (53rd Street)
- Broadway Theatre (41st Street) (1888–1929)
- Daly's Theatre (30th St.) or Broadway Theatre (1876–1879)
- New Theatre Comique or Broadway Theatre (1865-1884)
- Old Broadway Theatre or Broadway Theatre, (1847–1859)
- Wallack's Theatre or Broadway Theatre (1864–1869)

== Elsewhere ==
- Broadway Theatre (Buenos Aires), Argentina
- Broadway Theatre (Saskatoon), Saskatchewan, Canada
- Broadway Theatre (Toronto), Ontario, Canada
- Broadway Theatre (Prague), Czech Republic
- The Broadway (theatre), Barking, London, UK
- Broadway Theatre, Catford, London Borough of Lewisham, UK
- Broadway Theatre (Mount Pleasant, Michigan), US
- Broadway Theatre (Cape Girardeau, Missouri), US
- Broadway Theatre (Portland, Oregon), US
- Broadway Theatre (Los Angeles, California), US
- Tally's New Broadway, formerly Broadway Theatre, Los Angeles, US

== See also ==
- Broadway Cinema, Nottinghamshire, England, UK
- Broadway Cinematheque, Hong Kong
