= Broadway Theatre (Toronto) =

Canadian theatre

Coordinates: 43.65156°N 79.38268°W

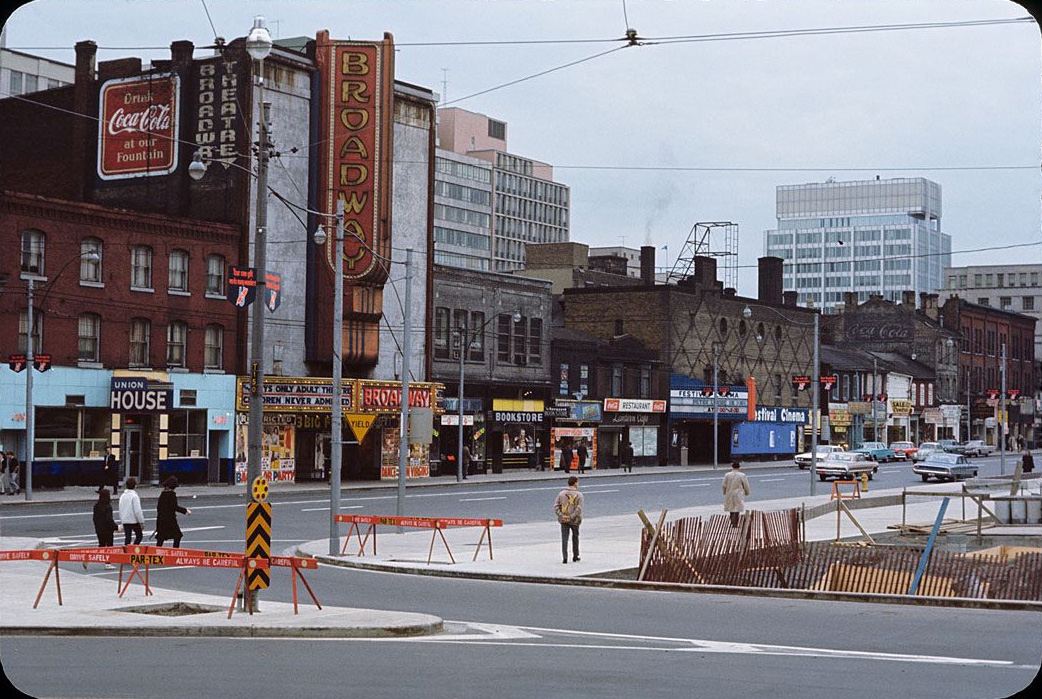
- The Broadway Theatre on the south side of Queen Street West during the early 1960s; the vacant lot under construction across Queen would by 1965 become Nathan Phillips Square.
- Interactive map of the Broadway Theatre area
- Former names: Globe Theatre, Roxy Theatre

General information
- Location: 75 Queen St West, Toronto, Ontario, Canada
- Opened: 1918
- Demolished: 1965

The Broadway Theatre was a burlesque live theatre and cinema in Toronto, Ontario, Canada. The theatre was opened under the name of Globe Theatre, in 1918. It was renamed the Roxy Theatre in the early 1930s and assumed its final name, the Broadway Theatre, in 1937. It was located on the southwest corner of Bay and Queen streets at 75 Queen Street West.

The Broadway was initially a traditional burlesque theatre. In 1933, it was renamed the Roxy and offered girlie shows. In 1935, the theatre's manager was murdered in his office. CA$378 (equivalent to $8,502 in 2025) appeared to have been stolen, but, according to author and cinema historian Doug Taylor, Toronto Police did not believe robbery was the motive. The shooter was never identified.

When New City Hall was to be built on the north side of the street, politicians felt that the Broadway and the Casino Theatre, another burlesque theatre just five doors west, pawn shops and the block's other businesses were inconsistent with civic dignity, and the whole block was expropriated and demolished in 1965. Following a two year construction, from fall 1972, the block became the site of the large Four Seasons Sheraton Hotel (since rebranded as Sheraton Centre Toronto Hotel). At the far corner was an office block with a Toronto Dominion Bank branch, which was also demolished and replaced with a low rise glass pavilion housing a TD Bank.
