= Toronto City Hall =

Canadian city hall, opened 1965

- Exterior of Toronto City Hall from the southwest, 2026

- Location within Toronto

General information
- Type: office building
- Architectural style: Neo-Expressionist Modern
- Location: Toronto, Ontario, 100 Queen Street West
- Coordinates: 43°39′12″N 079°23′02″W
- Construction started: November 7, 1961
- Inaugurated: September 13, 1965
- Cost: $31 million ($303 million in 2025 dollars)
- Owner: City of Toronto government

Height
- Height: 99.7 m (327.1 ft)(east tower); 79.6 m (261.2 ft)(west tower)

Technical details
- Structural system: reinforced concrete
- Floor count: 20/27

Design and construction
- Architects: Viljo Revell; John B. Parkin Associates
- Structural engineer: Hannskarl Bandel
- Main contractor: Anglin Norcross Ontario
- Awards: Ontario Association of Architects 25 Year Award (1998)

Renovating team
- Architect: Bruce Kuwabara

Other information
- Public transit: at Queen or Osgoode

Ontario Heritage Act
- Designated: 1991

The Toronto City Hall, or New City Hall, is the seat of the municipal government of Toronto, Ontario, Canada, and one of the city's most distinctive landmarks. Designed by Viljo Revell and engineered by Hannskarl Bandel, this example of Neo-Expressionist Modern architecture opened in 1965. Adjacent is the Nathan Phillips Square public square, designed and opened together with the hall.

Toronto City Hall replaced the neighbouring Old City Hall, which had been occupied by the municipal government since 1899 but was no longer adequate in size. Plans for a civic square dated to the 1900s, inspired by the "City Beautiful" movement.

The design of the hall and square was the result of an international design competition in 1958. The design competition sparked a national discussion on the meaning of monumental public buildings, the role of competitions in design and the place of urban public space in society. It was the first architectural competition in Ontario to allow international architects, requiring the local architects' association to change its rules and allow open competition at the instigation of then Toronto Mayor Nathan Phillips, after whom the square is named.

== History ==
The first proposal to build a civic square at Queen Street West and Bay Street was made before World War I in 1905, followed by the Lyle plan of 1911. It included a civic square and monumental government buildings inspired by the "City Beautiful" movement. While the proposal ultimately failed, one part was built: the 1917 Classical-style Land Registry Office. Another proposal in 1927 failed due to the onset of the Great Depression, as there was no longer any civic will to spend the money.

By the end of World War II, the old City Hall was full, and municipal employees were being housed elsewhere. Interest in a new city hall and square was renewed. In 1943, a report to city council had recommended a new city hall and square in the block bounded by Queen Street West, Bay Street, Chestnut Street, and a line 460 feet (140 m) north of Albert Street. A referendum to spend CA$2,000,000 (equivalent to $31,883,495 in 2025) on land acquisition was approved by the electorate in a referendum on New Year's Day in 1947. Acquisitions of lands in the proposed block proceeded, but no other activity proceeded. Most buildings in the block were small two-storey buildings housing Toronto's first Chinatown; on Bay (then Teraulay) was the large 1914 Shea's Hippodrome, a huge theatre for vaudeville and cinema (once considered one of the "big four" theatres in North America) which operated on the site until 1956.

In October 1952, a Civic Advisory Committee panel of citizens appointed by city council proposed a new building facing a civic square. The design proposed an office block with council chamber linking the existing Land Registry Office with a new police headquarters, all in the same style as the Registry Office, and to be designed by local firm Marani and Morris. This proposal was criticized by the University of Toronto Architecture Department staff and students and local architects, and was scrapped.

The rejected design by Marani & Morris, Mathers & Haldenby, Shore & Moffat

In 1954, City Council approved a partnership of three of Toronto's largest architectural firms – Marani and Morris, Mathers and Haldenby, and Shore and Moffat – to create a design. Presented in November 1955, their design proposed a conservative, symmetrical limestone-clad building in the Modernist style facing a landscaped square. It retained the Land Registry Office on the western part of the site and also included a landscaped public space in front of it. The podium of the new city hall was to house the council chambers, and was given columns to complement the eight columns of the Registry Building, with which it was aligned across the new public space in front of it. The tower was virtually identical to the Imperial Oil Building which Mathers and Haldenby were constructing on St. Clair Avenue West.

The scheme was panned by leading architects, including Frank Lloyd Wright (who called it a "sterilization" and "a cliché already dated") and Walter Gropius (who deemed it a "very poor pseudo-modern design unworthy of the city of Toronto"), and all classes of the University of Toronto Faculty of Architecture co-authored a letter condemning the proposal and calling for an international competition. The whole CA$18 million proposal was scrapped when voters rejected it in a 1955 municipal election.

Mayor Nathan Phillips proposed an international design competition for the project and put approval for the project to a referendum. In the 1955 municipal election, voters approved in principle a plan to build a new city hall and square at a cost of CA$18 million, without a specific design.

=== Design competition ===
Led by Mayor Nathan Phillips, the Toronto City Council decided in 1956 to hold an international competition to choose the new design under terms created by the International Union of Architects. This caused some controversy as some felt a Canadian should do the work. The Ontario Association of Architects (OAA) was persuaded successfully to allow an international competition, its first, as long as international architects paired with a local architect. Planning Commissioner Matthew Lawson and advisor Eric Arthur, a University of Toronto architecture professor, selected a five-person panel of judges from international architecture experts. The jury included architects Canadian Charles E. "Ned" Pratt, Italian Ernesto Nathan Rogers, Finnish-American Eero Saarinen, and British-Canadian Gordon Stephenson, plus Briton planner William Holford. One of the conditions was a $5 entry fee; however, Arthur did not specify Canadian funds. Arthur would receive pesos, pesetas, kroner, marks, and many other currencies, along with books worth more than $5, all of which were returned to failed entrants. One entrant offered a free vacation in Hungary.

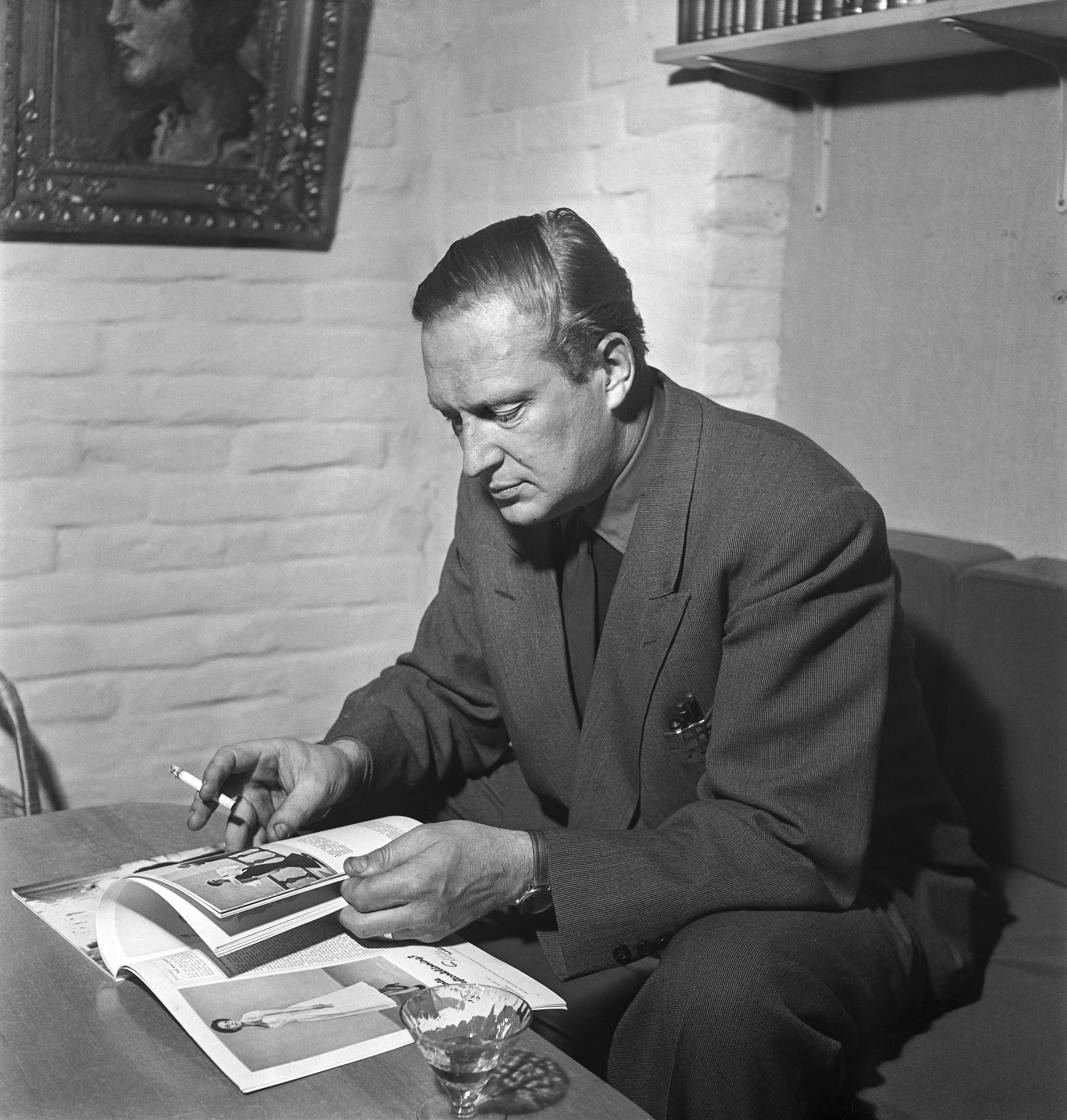
Viljo Revell, the competition winner, in 1953

The response from architects was enthusiastic. By October 1957, 731 entries were received. This number was pared down to 540 satisfactory entries by the deadline of April 18, 1958, from 42 countries, led by 132 from the United States, 75 from Canada and 65 from Great Britain. Arthur arranged to rent the CNE's Horticulture Building for two weeks to house all models received. An architectural model of the surrounding neighbourhood was created, with a space in the center where each entry's model could be placed, so as to judge it in context. The jury "looked primarily for designs that have architectural quality combined with imagination", and "original solutions to this difficult problem". Many of the entries followed the style of prominent architects like Mies van der Rohe, Frank Lloyd Wright and Le Corbusier as well as "Neo-Classical designs that would have looked fresh around the time of the First World War and Soviet-style palaces that would have gladdened the heart of any Stalinist". One unique design included a hall with dance floor, bar, and orchestra pit on the ground floor of the public space. The jury was able to reduce the count of possible designs to 200 rather quickly. The initial discards included Viljo Revell's design. Saarinen arrived a day and half late and demanded to see the discards. He chose Revell's design and convinced the other judges to reconsider it. Revell's design was included among the eight finalists, and was the only Finnish entry among one Canadian, one Danish, and five American designs. Two alternate designs, one American and one German, were also chosen if any of the eight finalists would not continue, though all eight did choose to continue.

The finalists were:

- John Andrews (U.S.)
- da:Halldor Gunnløgsson and sv:Jørn Nielsen (Denmark)
- William Hayward (U.S.)
- David Horne (Canada)
- Frank Mikutowski (U.S.)
- I.M. Pei (U.S.)
- Perkins & Will (U.S.)
- Viljo Revell (Finland)

The finalists were each paid CA$7,500 (equivalent to $83,209 in 2025) to expand upon or revise their submissions and given four months to complete a final design. The finalists were instructed about the total square footage needed, that a reasonably economic structure should be proposed, and to consider the severity of Toronto's climate. The council chamber and public space design was left to the finalists.

The finished designs of the finalists arrived in September 1958 and were assembled in the Old City Hall. The jurors worked into the early morning of September 26, in time for Mayor Phillips' announcement of the winning design at 8 am. The jury decided on Revell's design. The other finalists were judged lower based on various characteristics of their designs, including the entrances, an impractical set of two squares, a lack of expression of the council chamber to the outside, and putting the library in a separate building. Pratt, Rogers and Saarinen voted for Revell's design, with Holford and Stephenson dissenting. Holford and Stephenson liked the originality of Revell's design, but were skeptical that it could be built within the CA$18 million budget set by the city. In his opinion, Arthur concluded that Revell had won because he had paid careful attention to the emphasis placed in the conditions of a building that expressed the various functions of City Hall. The conditions pointed to a "sculptural" form and Revell's was the "most representative".

Revell's winning design

The winner was announced by Mayor Phillips, who actually disliked the winning design, and had made "numerous snide remarks" about it in conversation with Lawson, who felt it would make a "wonderful symbol" for the city. According to Lawson, Phillips was concerned that voters would not take to the exotic proposal and blame Phillips for saddling them with the cost. The announcement was broadcast on CBC television with host architect Jacqueline Tyrwhitt interviewing Revell, Arthur, and the jury members, including dissenting remarks by Holford and Stephenson. The winning model, the finalists, and a selection of other designs were displayed in a public exhibition at Eaton's College Street store.

Reaction to the design was mixed. Frank Lloyd Wright dismissed Revell's design as a "head marker for a grave" and "the spot where Toronto fell". Some critics called it "two sewer pipes standing on end" and a politician said it looked like a "Mexican Hotel". Several architects, including Thomas Creighton and Eberhard Ziedler, publicly expressed admiration for the design. Revell's mentor, Alvar Aalto, wired Revell: "Seldom does a colleague feel so happy over another's victory." Phillips would later admit "while acceptance has not been unanimous, I can say that the preponderance of public opinion favours the design submitted by Mr. Rewell [sic]." All of the jurors expressed their enthusiasm for the project to go ahead. In a formal report to the city, they said, "Its monumental qualities are of a high order and it is a composition of great strength. Its shape is distinctive and dramatic, setting it apart from other structures in Toronto and from administrative and office buildings elsewhere."

Revell received a CA$25,000 (equivalent to $270,066 in 2025) prize plus an estimated CA$1 million in fees to supervise construction. As part of the OAA conditions, he partnered with John B. Parkin Associates as the local architect. Revell and his family moved to Toronto and resided in Don Mills near the Parkin offices. His design collaborators, whom Revell considered as co-architects, Heikki Castren, Bengt Lundsten, and Seppo Valjus, also came to Toronto in 1959 for extended stays. As a result of him living in both Toronto and Helsinki, the Canadian and Finnish governments both claimed he owed tax on his city hall work, leading him to conclude that his tax exposure to Canada and Finland exceeded his actual revenue. For this reason, Revell moved to Boston in October 1962 and taught at MIT, while commuting to Toronto for just three days per week, eliminating the Canadian taxation. Revell suffered a stroke in the autumn of 1963 while in Mexico. After this, Revell returned to Helsinki. After October 1963, Revell only visited Toronto once to view the project. Only a week after his visit in October 1964, Revell died of a heart attack at the age of 54.

The design competition, its emphasis on modernity, and its openness to international design opened many eyes to the meaning and role of public monumental buildings and spaces in Canada. As well, simply having a design competition was a new idea for Toronto and had been previously little used in Canada. Design competitions for new public buildings became the norm.

Architectural historian Claude Bergeron describes Toronto's civic square as being "Canada's first modern civic square". Canadian cities started including public squares in their plans for new city halls, such as Windsor, Ontario, West Vancouver, British Columbia and Whitby, Ontario.

The announcement was broadcast live nationally on television, and the CBC produced a documentary on the project for the program Explorations. The project marked a cultural turning point. Now architectural competitions and public buildings would become matters of national public interest and discussion. City hall design competitions in Winnipeg, Red Deer, Alberta, Chomedey, Quebec and Brantford, Ontario were all affected by the experience of the Toronto competition. Revell himself participated in the Red Deer competition, Arthur helped in the Winnipeg and Brantford competitions, and Toronto finalist John Andrews participated in the judging of the Brantford competition. Jury panels for these competitions were also drawn up like Toronto's jury, including jurors from outside their local sphere. Also, like Toronto, the projects received national attention in the professional press.

=== Construction ===
Although the design was basically complete, the boundaries for the project were set in October 1959 to be Bay Street, Queen Street, and Hagerman Avenue. A proposal to connect to York Street was dropped. This area was formerly the location of Toronto's first Chinatown, located along the north side of Queen and both sides of Elizabeth Street to Dundas Street West. Much of it was expropriated and bulldozed already and families and businesses moved west to Dundas Street West and Spadina Avenue.

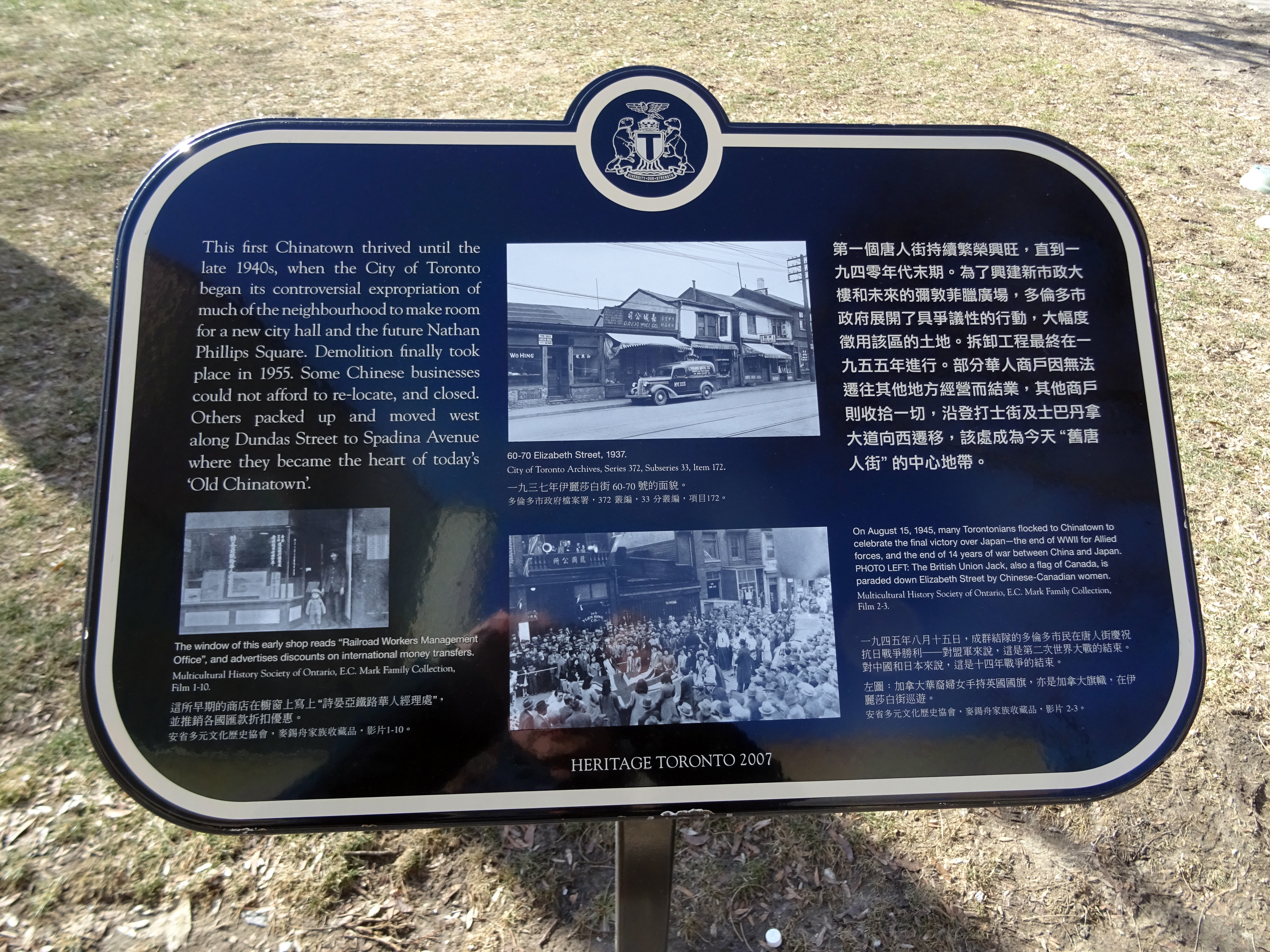
A Heritage Toronto plaque commemorating Toronto's first Chinatown that was demolished in the 1950s to make way for the new city hall.

Before proceeding with construction, there was concern that the project would exceed the CA$18 million already approved. This led to a last-minute effort by Metro Chairman Fred Gardiner to try to derail the project. His proposal was to keep the Registry Office and instead build a simple City Hall in the same style. After a review and minor redesign of the project, a budget of CA$24 million was settled upon, and the project proceeded. To reduce the overall project cost to the city, the Toronto Parking Authority agreed to pay for the complete underground parking garage. The increase meant the city had to get the Ontario Municipal Board's approval, which came in October 1961, allowing the city to issue CA$20.4 million in new debt.

The construction firm Anglin Norcross Ontario bid CA$23.58 million to win the contract. Coming in under $24 million led city council to approve the project and add a floor to each tower. At the same time, the council voted unanimously to name the square after Mayor Phillips. The official sod-turning to start construction was done on November 7, 1961. Phillips spoke at the ceremony:

"some historians might be exact enough to set down the fact that although it took almost fifteen years to get to the staring line, none of us arrived out of breath. All of the people ... have shared this dream."

In Revell's design, the outside walls of the towers were clad in precast concrete panels with 3/4-inch vertical strips of Botticino marble, intended to help the walls sparkle when floodlit. The panels cost CA$2.5 million in total, and the contract went to Toronto Cast Stone Co., which had to build a new machine to construct them. The panels were also used as the formwork for the 18-inch-thick (46 cm) reinforced concrete structural walls of the towers.

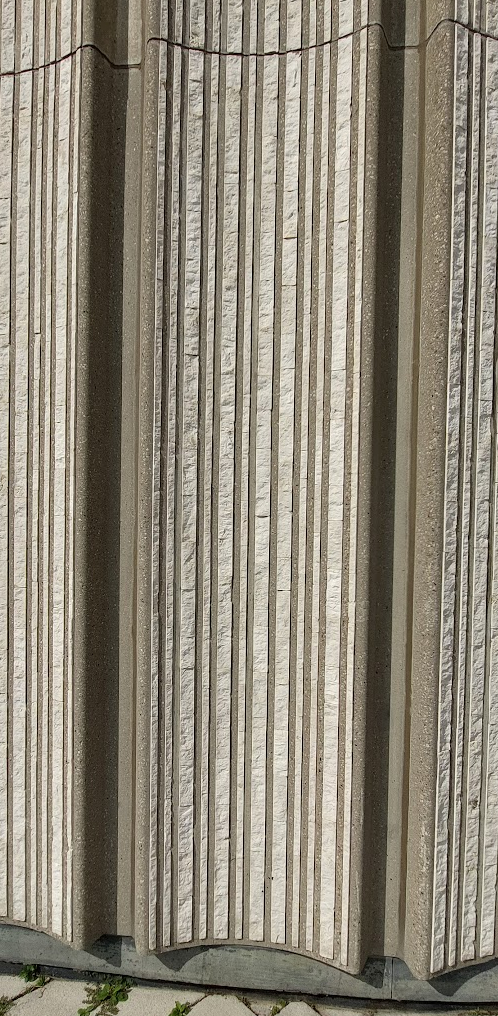
Exterior concrete and marble panels of Toronto City Hall

The time capsule for City Hall was placed in a large ceremony on November 7, 1962. Mayor Phillips, on his 70th birthday, dropped the 2-foot-long (61 cm) steel capsule into a foundation column. Bishop Francis Marroco, Reverend James R. Mutchmor, and Rabbi Stuart E. Rosenberg all said prayers, a Salvation Army band provided music, and fireworks ended the half-hour ceremony. It contains municipal handbooks, coins dating to the incorporation of Toronto, postage stamps, the city's old and new coat of arms, microfilms of the city's three newspapers, a map of the city, and photographs of the city's reception for Queen Elizabeth II and Prince Philip held in 1959.

The project experienced several delays during construction. Anglin Norcross received its drawings late from the architects. This delay alone meant the city could not receive Queen Elizabeth at the new City Hall in the summer of 1964. Indecision about the location of the cafeteria led to another delay. Some councillors advocated for an east tower rooftop location, while others did not want to spend the additional money. Finally, the city approved the addition of a basement cafeteria. By July 1962, Revell and Parkin had not yet set up a site office, leaving the general contractor with a long period without any progress. By October 1962, the project was eight weeks behind schedule, with both towers not having risen above grade. In March 1963, city council voted to stop payments to the contractor and prohibit further design changes; structural work was five months behind schedule, and mechanical work even longer. The city also kept open the option of a rooftop restaurant well into 1963. The plan to open the City Hall for occupancy in the summer of 1964 was dropped.

The demolition of the Land Registry Office was completed in stages. A section was demolished in 1962, leaving the rest in use, while excavation was done for the underground parking garage. The courts at Osgoode Hall objected to the construction noise during trials, and the York County Sheriff warned that a summons for contempt of court would be issued. The work was then timed around trial times. The building was finally vacated in May 1964, and a firm was hired by Anglin Norcross to demolish it. It did not start immediately and was not finished until the end of December.

There were disputes about the concrete cladding's quality and colours, electric heating, and the podium roof. These disputes were resolved by early 1964, and construction picked up its pace. Revell made his final visit to the project in autumn 1964, and was quoted as "generally pleased" although he did point out some mistakes to a Toronto Star reporter. He had a fatal heart attack only days after his visit. That fall marked the completion of the underground parking garage, considered the world's largest underground parking garage at the time, and later that fall, the southern part of the square was finished, allowing ice skating on the reflecting pool for the first time.

One final dispute was made over the interior furnishings. Revell had been promised the design and selection of furnishings. Instead, the city created a "Furnishing Design Committee" which would supervise a design competition supervised by Eric Arthur. Revell disputed the plan but later died, making the point moot. The firm Knoll International was chosen by the committee, despite being nearly CA$200,000 over the projected CA$850,000 budget. This led to efforts by city officials, politicians, and interested citizens to influence the outcome. In the end, Knoll's proposal prevailed by a narrow margin at the city council.

=== Related projects ===
Outside of the boundaries of the City Hall and square, new buildings were built to the south and west. The south side of Queen Street, opposite City Hall, was considered incompatible by the competition judges. In May 1958, the jury made the case to the Board of Control to build a facade of new buildings with an arcade for the full length along Queen. The businesses on that side of the street included two burlesque theatres (Broadway Theatre and Casino Theatre), pawn shops, and a cinema. The Globe and Mail agreed, stating "it would be a disgrace to leave a stick of it standing as a backdrop to the expensive – and, we hope, beautiful – Civic Square." Later in 1958, the Planning Board recommended that the City purchase the properties on the south side of Queen and engage a developer to redevelop the site. City Council declared it a "redevelopment area" and budgeted CA$7 million for the purchase. The Toronto Star repeatedly termed the site a "commercial slum", but came out against the plan to use government money to transfer properties between private owners.

The transfer of lands went slowly, as most property owners did not agree to sell. Finally, in August 1964, the Toronto City Council voted to expropriate the south side for redevelopment. Most of the block was bought at a budget of CA$6.5 million and demolished in July 1965. The south side was vacant at the time of the City Hall opening, but was eventually occupied by a new hotel. Two hotel chains vied for the site: Hilton and partners Four Seasons and Sheraton. Four Seasons and Sheraton were approved in July 1968 after the developers behind the Hilton bid failed to convince City officials they had adequate financing. The designs were approved in April 1969, and formal ground-breaking occurred in May 1970. The new Four Seasons Sheraton Hotel's design was a collaboration between the City Hall's architects, Parkin and Associates, Seppo Valjus, and Searle, Wlibee, and Rowland. Its concrete exterior was designed to match the City Hall in colour and texture. An extension to the square's elevated walkways connects to the hotel.

To the west of the new City Hall, the Toronto Armories at University Avenue just north of Osgoode Hall was bought from the Government of Canada by Metro Toronto for approximately CA$2 million to be demolished to make way for a new courthouse, considered part of the civic square project. In conjunction with the courthouse, a pedestrian mall connecting the square to University Avenue was built. The mall had been suggested by the design jury. The mall is of polygonal design, with a courtroom above. The Toronto Courthouse itself was designed to be compatible with both the historic Osgoode Hall to the south and the new City Hall.

=== Opening and post-completion changes ===
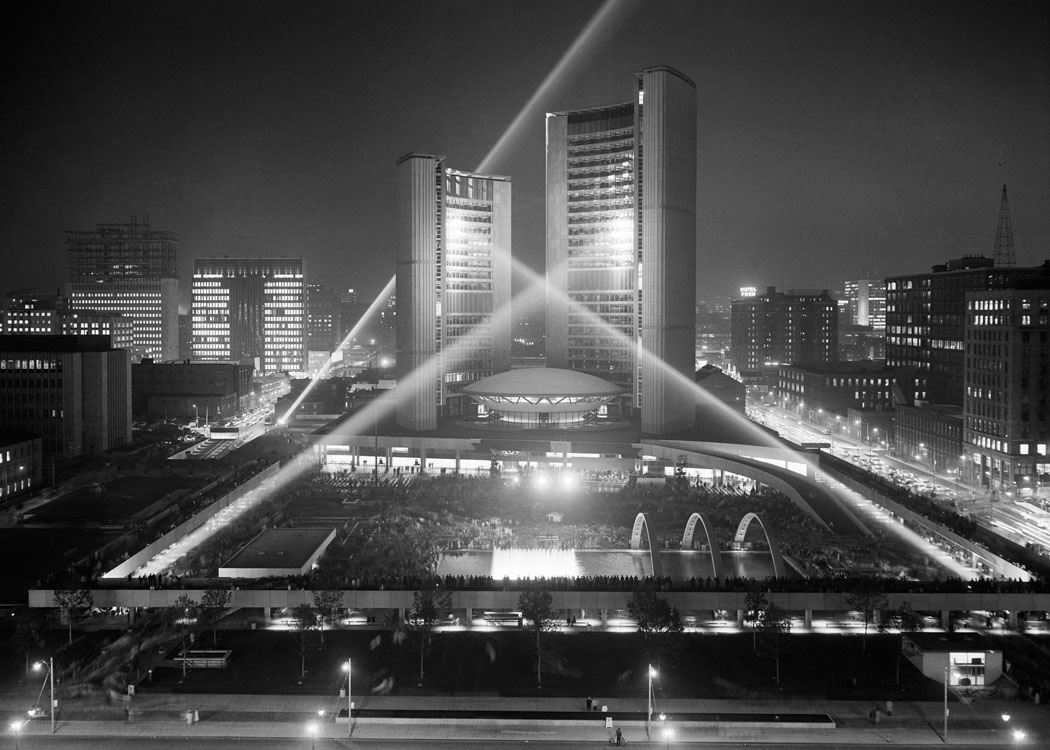
Official opening of City Hall in 1965.

The building was officially opened to the public on the afternoon of Monday, September 13, 1965, by Georges Vanier, the governor general of Canada. The opening ceremony was attended by 14,000 dignitaries, including Lester B. Pearson, the prime minister of Canada, John Robarts, the premier of Ontario, Maire Revell, Viljo's spouse, and former mayor Phillips. The ceremony was part of six days of festivities. The first evening was a military pageant. The second night featured performances by the Toronto Symphony Orchestra, the Canadian Opera Company, and National Ballet of Canada. Wednesday was square dancing, Thursday was a board of education presentation, Friday was community folk arts, and Saturday was "Toronto A-Go-Go" dancing. Each night's entertainment was concluded with fireworks from the vacant land on the south side of Queen Street.

The parking garage and podium roof both exhibited water leakage problems from the start. The parking garage leakage was repaired, but the podium roof's problems persisted past the main completion date, prompting the City to hold back CA$500,000 to Anglin Norcross due to repeated water leakage. In 1966, oyster mushrooms were found to be growing beneath the ceiling of the ground floor, prompting Property Commissioner Bremner to remark: "we are at least growing edible mushrooms". In his design, Revell had envisioned a landscaped area with a pool surrounding the council chamber on the podium roof. By 1968, the leakage was so bad that the planned landscaping was abandoned, covered with roofing repairs. This left the pool surrounding the council chamber. After the pool was re-filled with water in 1970, leaks recurred. It was determined that the pool would have to be completely rebuilt at considerable cost and the decision was made to leave the pool dry. Revell's landscaped podium roof design was therefore completely abandoned, leaving only a large barren area on the podium roof.

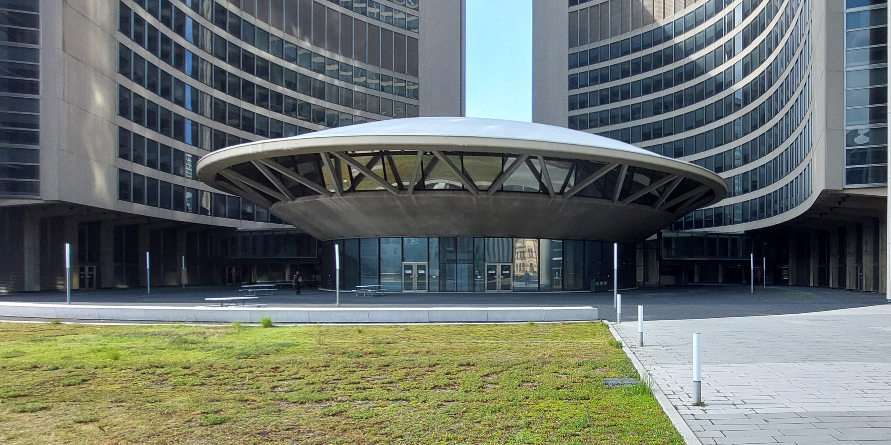
South elevation of Toronto City Hall Council Chamber and green roof

The project had displaced much of Toronto's "Old Chinatown" already and Toronto's development commissioner proposed the demolition of the rest of the district along the remainder of Elizabeth Street to Dundas Street for the purpose of a civic square. A "Save Chinatown Committee" was formed to fight the proposal and Toronto City Council endorsed keeping Old Chinatown as is. Further, two related proposals to widen Dundas to six lanes were also met with protests and rejected.

City Hall was designated as a property of historical and architectural significance under the Ontario Heritage Act in 1991 by Toronto City Council. In 1992, the non-profit Hester How Daycare Centre was opened in the building. It was named after the Toronto teacher Hester How, who helped turn around delinquent boys in the second half of the 19th century.

From 1997 to 1998, CA$7 million was spent to renovate council offices and the council chamber, create new public washrooms, and provide a covered walkway between the two towers. These were designed by Toronto architect Bruce Kuwabara. The new walkway's design was approved by the Toronto Society of Architects and was positioned so as to not be visible from the square. Also in 1998, the Toronto City Hall design was honoured with an Ontario Association of Architects 25-Year Award.

A substantial series of renovations was made in the 2000s. On the executive floor, the councillor reception areas and their furnishings were updated. However, the main work was on the exterior. The podium roof had fallen into disrepair and was replaced by a green roof in 2009. It was designed by PLANT Architects, Shore Tilbe Irwin & Partners, furniture designer Adrian Blackwell, and Chicago-based landscape architect Peter Schaudt. It features three distinct sections: a mosaic of sedum plants inspired by the Paul Klee painting Polyphony, a courtyard, and a cafe. It was formally opened to over 10,000 visitors on Doors Open Toronto weekend in May 2010. When constructed, the roof became the largest publicly accessible green roof in the city. Approximately 3,250 square metres (35,000 ft^{2}) of concrete on the podium roof was converted to living vegetation.

== Design and features ==
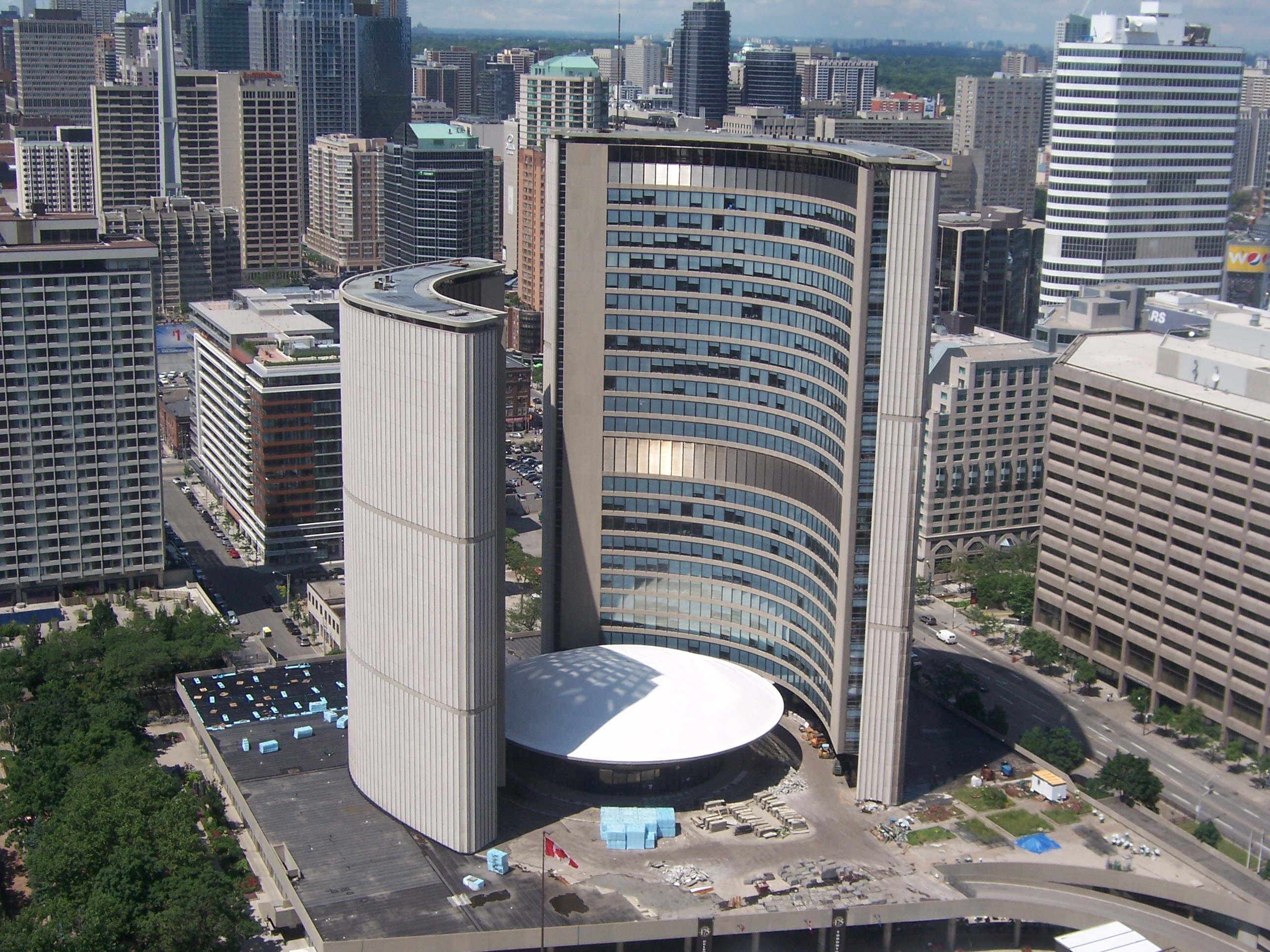
City Hall from the south

The Neo-Expressionist Modern design resembles no other building in Toronto. The design is two curved, asymmetric towers surrounding a saucer-shaped council chamber amphitheatre atop a two-storey podium. According to Toronto Architecture: A City Guide, it is "One of Toronto's very best buildings and one of the boldest leaps forward in the city's history."

When finished, the building generated widespread controversy among many who felt that it was "too futuristic" for the city. In Arthur's 1964 book, Toronto, No Mean City, he praised the new City Hall, writing: "Taller buildings will be built before the end of the century here and elsewhere in North America, but there will be no comparable or no more renowned city hall."

=== Exterior ===
On top of a podium rise two office towers of different heights, which curve to frame the saucer-shaped Council Chamber. The east tower is 27 storeys (99.5 metres [326 ft]) tall and the west tower is 20 storeys (79.4 metres [260 ft]). The structure is constructed of poured concrete.

The towers have windowless back walls, which are clad in preclad ribbed concave concrete panels with inlaid strips of Botticino marble. Revell designed the 4,000 panels' mixed construction so that the towers would "sparkle when floodlit." The inner facing walls are made of stainless steel and glass.

Building interior

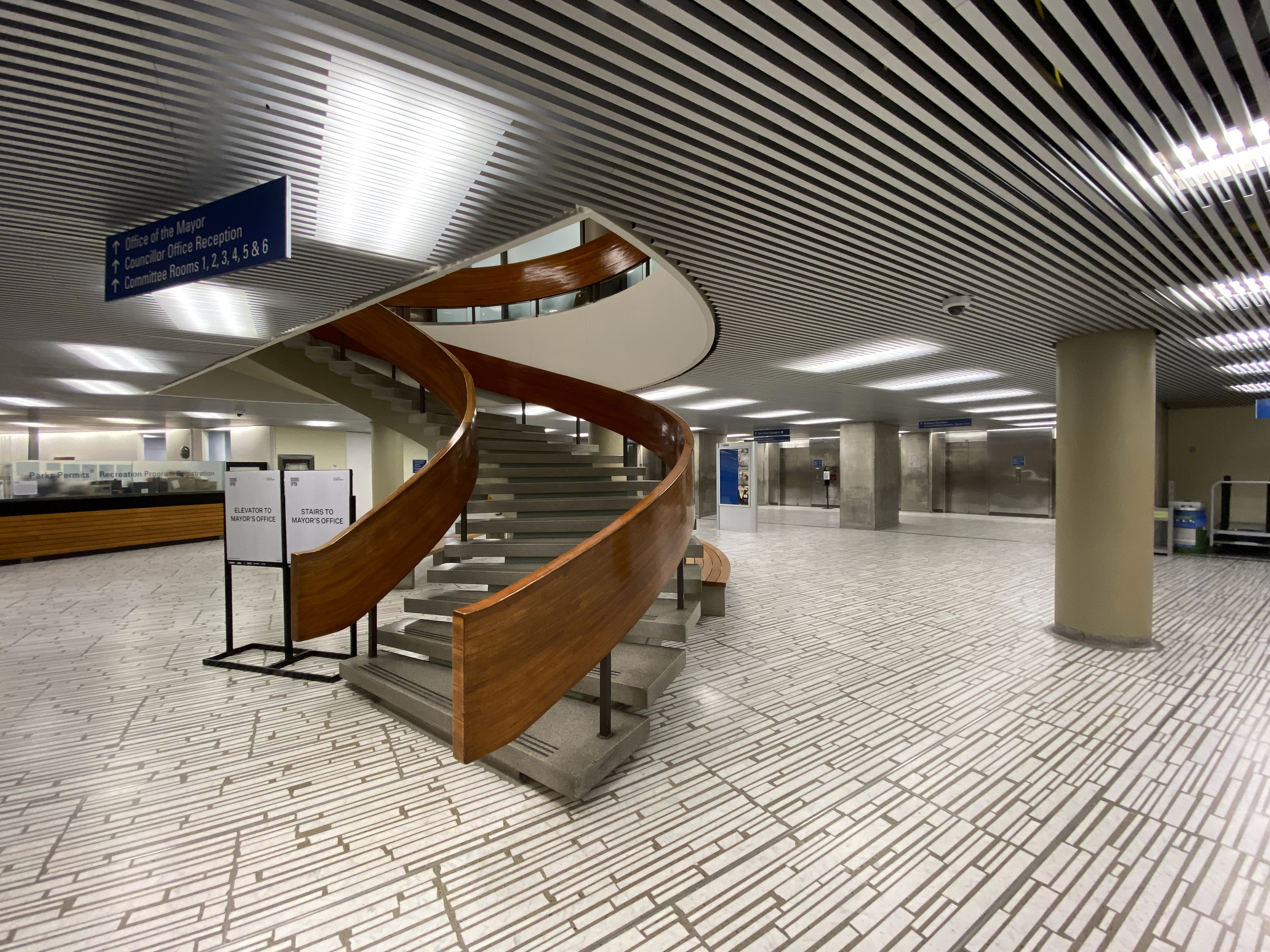
Lobby in the complex's east tower

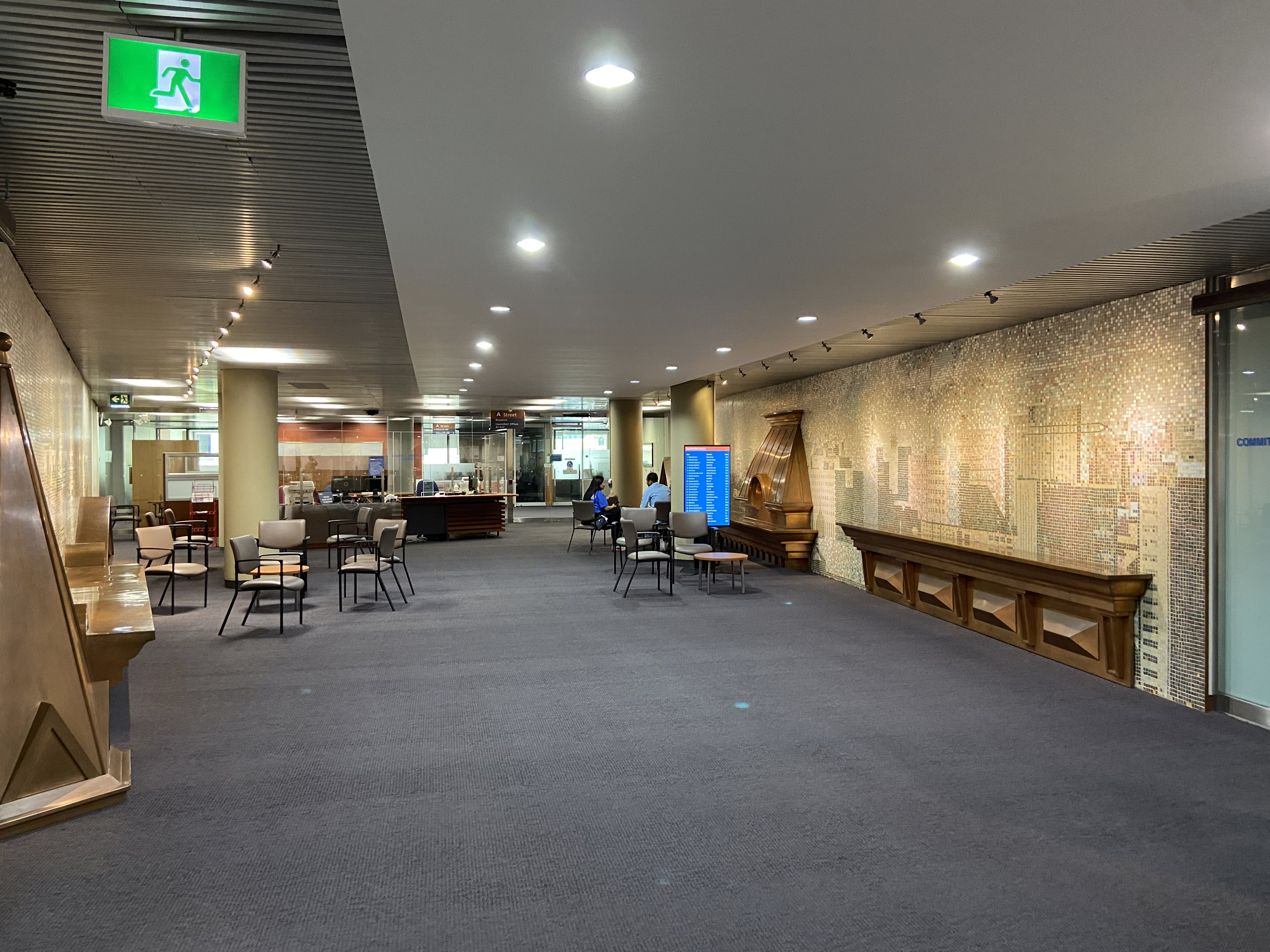
Councillor's office reception on the second level of the building.

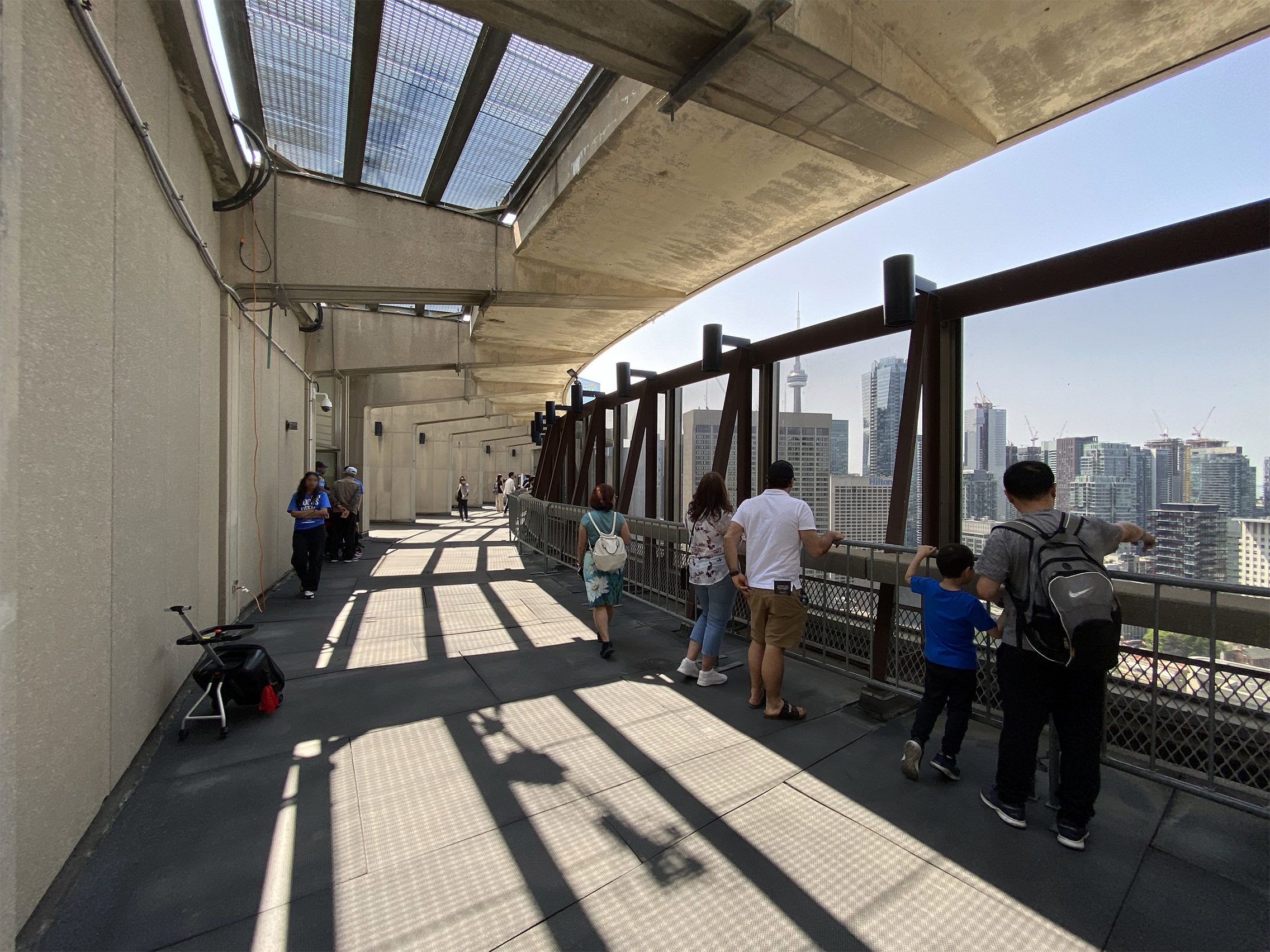
Observation deck on 27/F opened at Doors Open Toronto event

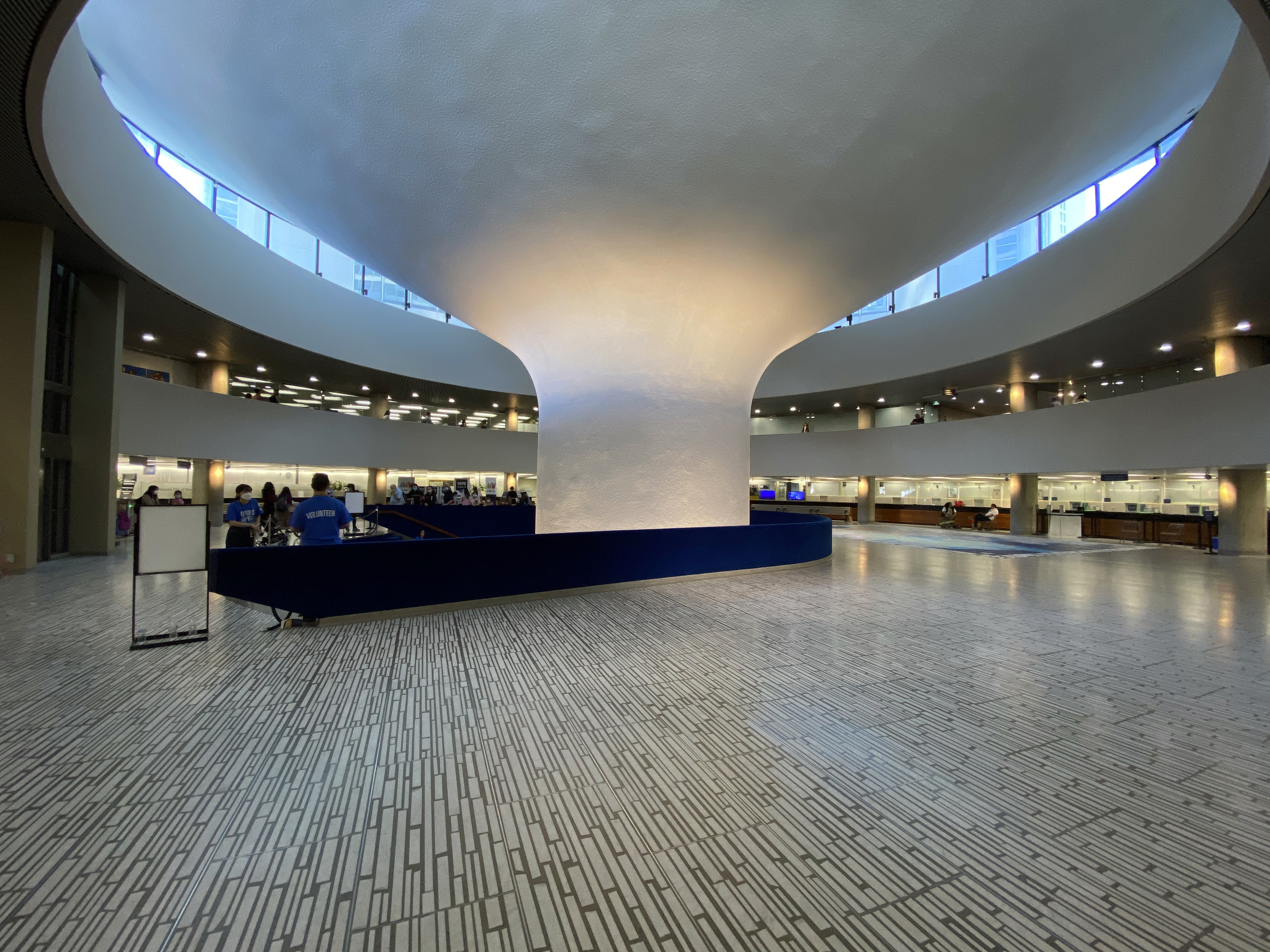
The lobby situated below the City Council chambers

The podium is two storeys in height with stainless steel and glass curtain walls matching the towers' inner walls. A ceremonial ramp leads from the east side of the square to the roof of the podium. The podium has three public entrances to the square.

=== Interior ===
Upon entering the building through the front doors, the lobby is a large and unique rotunda. Central to the rotunda is the massive circular support column for the Council chambers, surrounded on three sides by the "Hall of Memory". A few steps down, there is a glass bookcase that holds two books of remembrance on occasion that have been engraved with the names of people from Toronto who were casualties of the two world wars. The insignia of military units headquartered in Toronto since 1793 are displayed on white plaques around the hall. Inscribed on a support column in the lobby is architect Revell's name, and on one wall there is the mural Metropolis, made entirely of nails.

The second floor is the "executive" floor of City Hall. It is a mezzanine overlooking the first floor rotunda. The office of the mayor and city councillors are located here. The city's coat of arms and the mayor's chain of office are displayed, as well as the mosaic Views to the City in a reception area.

==== Council chambers ====
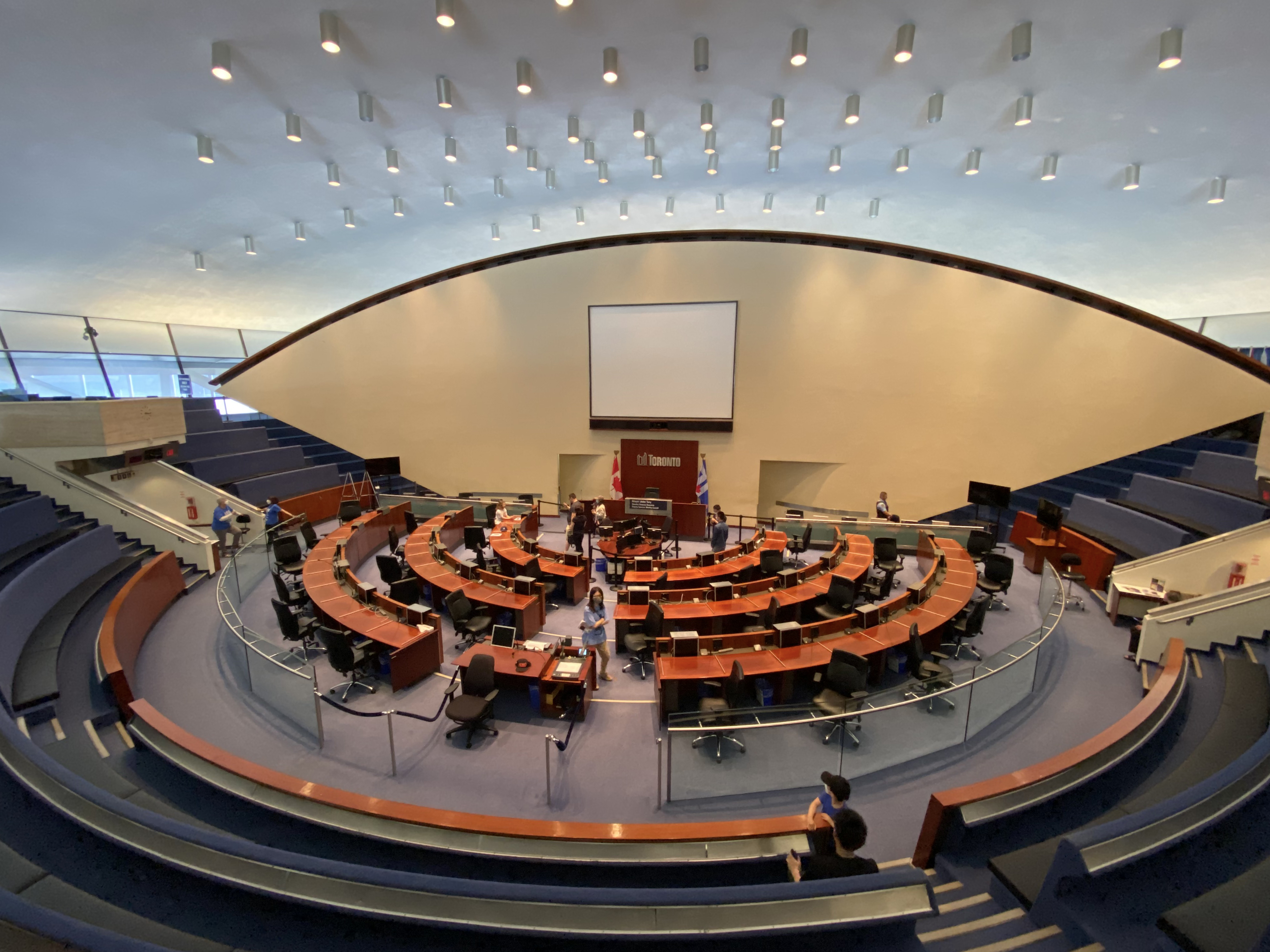
The semi-circular City Council chambers

The city council chambers is a semi-circular room located on the second floor. The chamber is supported by a single column of concrete below, visible from the first floor of the podium. To absorb sound, the chamber is carpeted and the ceiling is sound-dampened using carpet fibres. The ceiling weighs 2,000 tonnes (2,000 long tons; 2,200 short tons) of poured concrete. During construction, it took 40 days to dry.

The room is covered by a shallow dome resting on 23 pairs of v-shaped supports that rise from the base. The space behind the supports is filled with glass. The public seating gallery accommodates 250 in tiered rows around the chamber.

On the main level of the chambers are the seats and tables for the 25 members of Toronto City Council, arranged in a semi-circle, or horseshoe. Meetings are chaired by the Mayor or may be delegated to a councillor. They sit in the centre chair below the City of Toronto logo. In the middle of the horseshoe of councillors is a table for the City Clerk and clerk staff. Senior city staff sit to the left or right of the centre chair.

There are two ancillary rooms in the City Council saucer. Behind the public gallery is a seating area for the press. Behind the council chamber is the Members' Lounge. It is used by councillors for informal discussions and for official receptions.

=== Other features ===
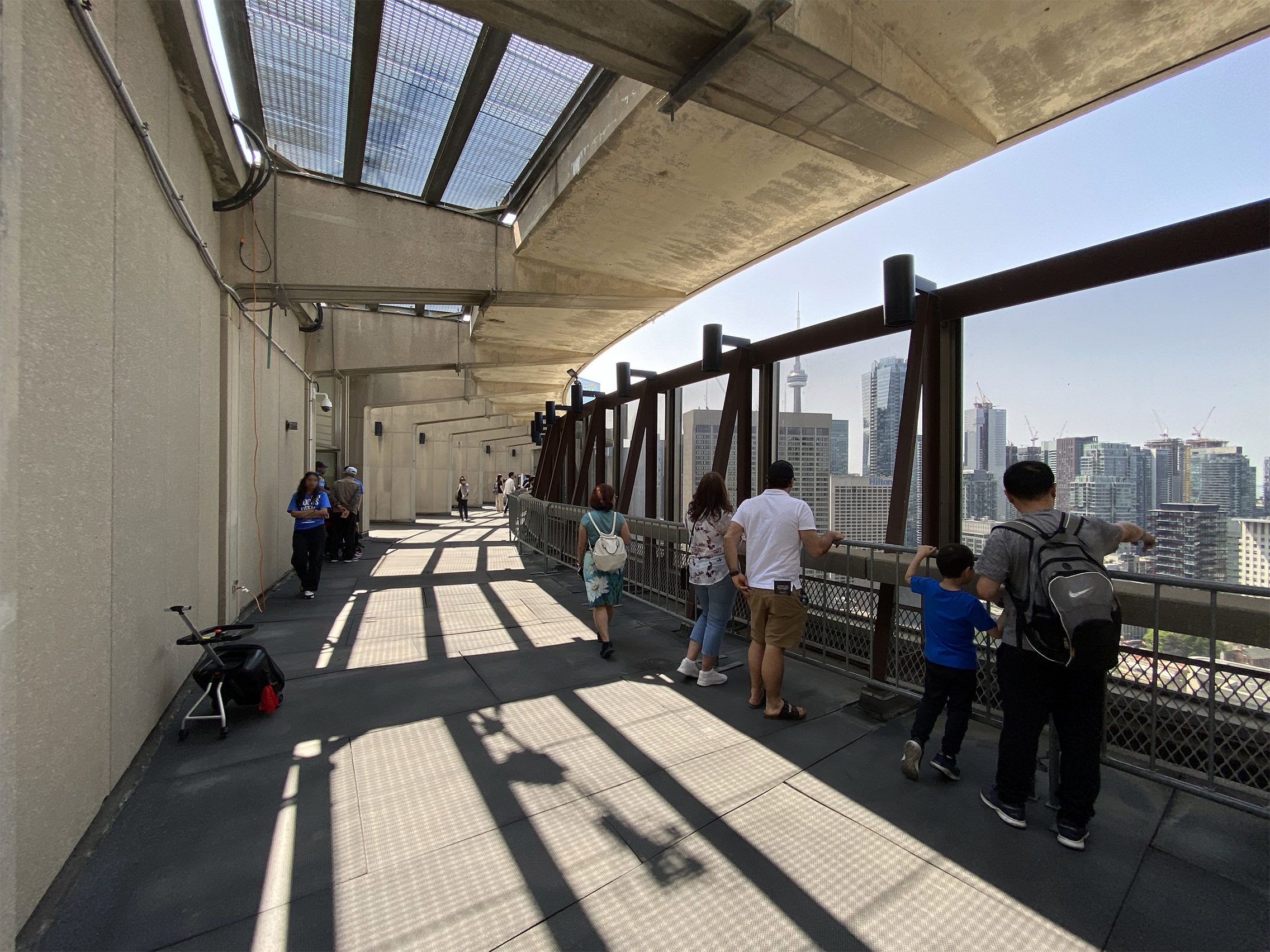
Observation deck in 2023

The building also includes observation decks, although these closed in 1979. Access to the observation deck, and other areas in the building complex, has been provided during the annual Doors Open Toronto event.

The building also includes a branch of the Toronto Public Library, although it has been reduced in size since its opening.

=== Public square ===
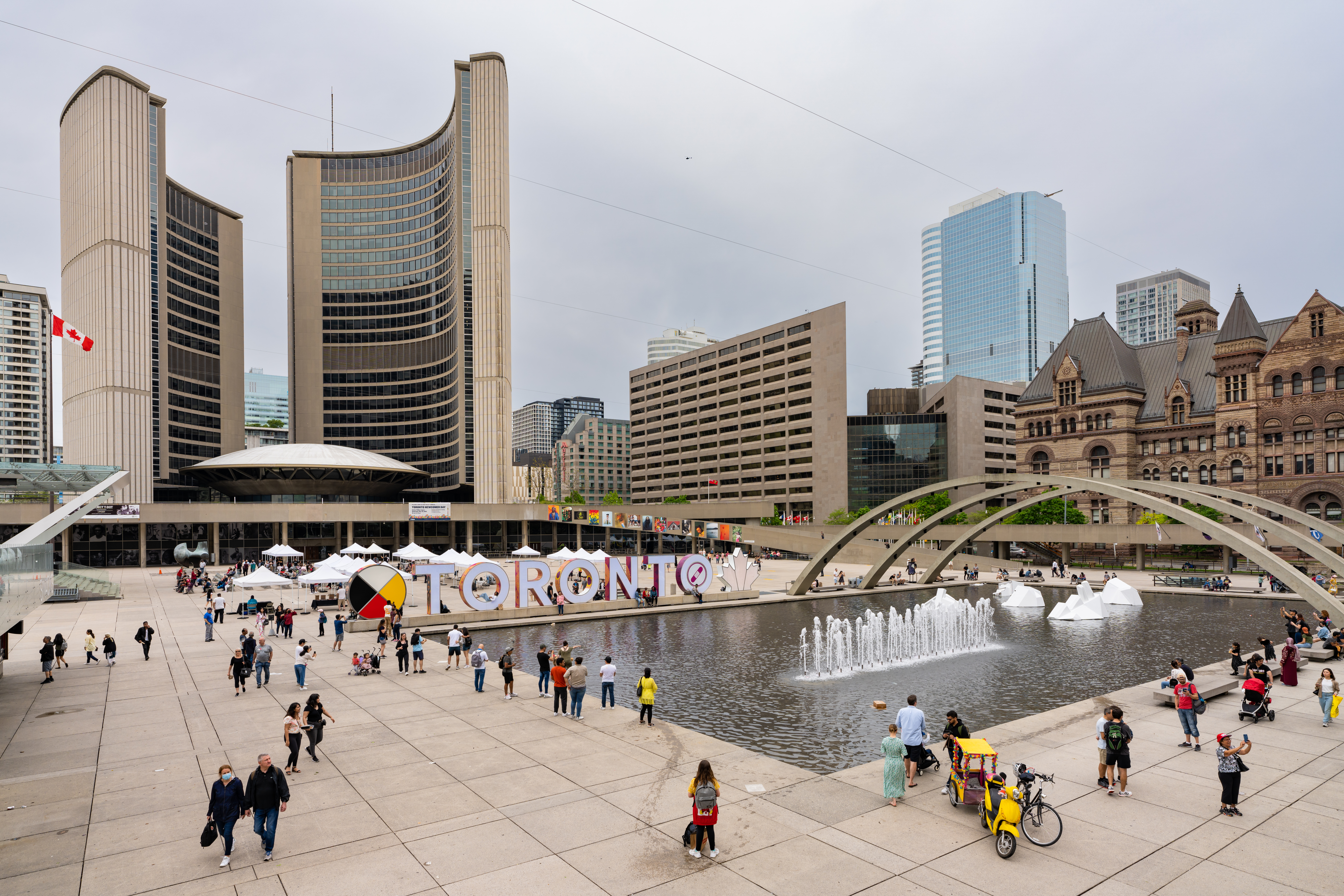
Nathan Phillips Square

The design for the public space in front of the new city hall, Nathan Phillips Square, was part of the original design competition. The square's reflecting pool and concrete arches, fountain, and overhead walkways surrounding the square, were thus also part of Revell's submission. It has since seen the addition of several monuments, sculptures, and other works of public art, including the Toronto Sign.

One piece of art is especially notable in the square. Revell had specified that a work of art would provide an "artistic focal point" in the square. He had become friends with the English sculptor Henry Moore. According to Revell, "None of my buildings is ready until there's a Henry Moore sculpture in front of it." Revell pushed the City government to accept a Moore artwork first, and supplement the artwork budget with Canadian works. An Art Committee was struck under the direction of Eric Arthur, reporting to City Council. In 1966, Moore offered Three-Way Piece No. 2 (The Archer) which he had created with Toronto City Hall in mind.

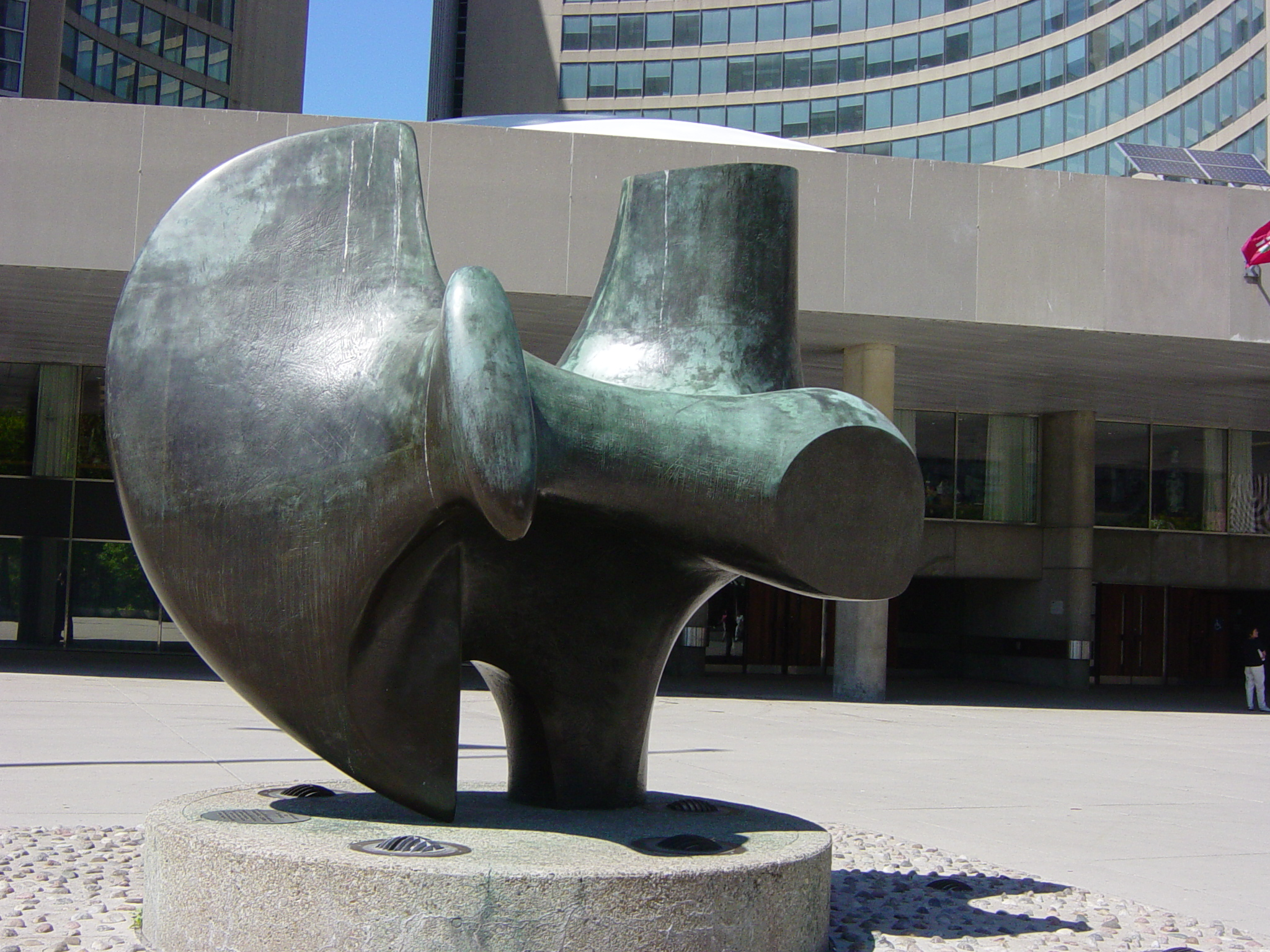
The Archer

The mayor's office received numerous letters opposing the acquisition of the Moore sculpture. A rival sculptor produced a sample of his work - "a Mooreish knock-off." Despite the public opposition, the Board of Control committee of Toronto City Council approved the purchase at the cost of CA$125,000. Several councillors opposed the purchase and insulted Moore's artwork. The magazine Canadian Architect noted the comedy at Toronto City Hall. They offered a statue of a Coca-Cola bottle to be paid for with one million bottlecaps.

To avoid the fight over public funds, it was proposed to raise the purchase money from volunteer donors. Fund-raising went well but only raised CA$100,000 to which Moore agreed. This was not the end of the wrangling at City Hall. The Board of Control and City Council wanted final say over the installation location, and the mounting of the sculpture itself became the matter of debate. It was finally unveiled on October 27, 1966, mounted near the City Hall's entrance. The event took place with a 7:30 pm band concert and an 8:30 pm unveiling. A group of university students protested. In its report, The New York Times stated "Thus did instant culture come last night to Toronto, a city known more for its hockey than its art." At its unveiling, Mayor Givens had the final word: "the Philistines have retreated in disorder."

== In popular culture ==
Even as early as 1969, the building appeared as a futuristic alien building in a Star Trek comic; it was later seen in the Star Trek: The Next Generation episode "Contagion" as one of the possible destinations of an alien portal. The 2010 film Red featured Toronto City Hall and various other city locations.

== See also ==
- Metro Hall
- East York Civic Centre
- Etobicoke Civic Centre
- North York Civic Centre
- Scarborough Civic Centre
- York Civic Centre

Preceded by Old City Hall (Toronto)	Toronto City Hall; 1965–	Succeeded by current

Preceded by 67 Adelaide Street East	Seat for the Municipal Government of Metropolitan Toronto; 1965–1992	Succeeded by Metro Hall
