= Broadway Bridge =

Broadway Bridge may refer to:

Canada

- Broadway Bridge (Saskatoon), in Saskatoon, Saskatchewan

United Kingdom

- Broadway Bridge (Liverpool), in Liverpool, Merseyside

United States

- Broadway Bridge (Clarkdale, Arizona), listed on the National Register of Historic Places (NRHP) in Yavapai County
- Broadway Bridge (Little Rock), in Arkansas
- Broadway Bridge (Denver, Colorado), in Colorado
- Broadway Bridge (Daytona Beach), in Florida
- Buck O'Neil Bridge, in Kansas City, Missouri, formerly and also called the Broadway Bridge
- Broadway Bridge (Little Falls), in Minnesota
- Broadway Bridge (Manhattan), in New York
- Broadway Bridge (Portland, Oregon), in Oregon
- Broadway Bridge (St. Peter, Minnesota), NRHP-listed in Nicollet County and in Le Sueur County
- Broadway Bridge (Greenville, Ohio), NRHP-listed

== See also ==
- Broadway Avenue Bridge in Minneapolis, Minnesota
- Broadway (disambiguation)
