= Broadway, Missouri =

Extinct hamlet in Missouri, U.S.

Coordinates: 38°06′06″N 91°42′28″W

Broadway
- Ghost town
- Location within Missouri Broadway (the United States)
- Country: United States
- State: Missouri
- County: Maries
- Post office established: 1898
- Post office closed: 1921
- Named for: Local nickname for nearby country road

Population
  - Total: 0
- Time zone: UTC−6 (Central (CST))
  - Summer (DST): UTC−5 (CDT)

Broadway is an extinct town in Maries County, in the U.S. state of Missouri.

A post office called Broadway was established in 1898, and remained in operation until 1921. The community was named in jest, as the nearby country road was referred to as "Broadway" by locals.
