= Broadway Market Building =

- U.S. National Register of Historic Places
- Location within North Carolina Location within the United States
- Location: 201 Broadway, Asheville, North Carolina
- Coordinates: 35°36′4″N 82°33′22″W
- Area: 0.1 acres (0.040 ha)
- Built: c. 1916; 110 years ago
- Architectural style: Concrete block construction
- NRHP reference No.: 05000939
- Added to NRHP: September 1, 2005

Broadway Market Building was a historic commercial building located at Asheville, Buncombe County, North Carolina. It was built about 1916, and was a two-story building constructed of hand-pressed panel-face concrete block with beveled edges. The building has been demolished.

It was listed on the National Register of Historic Places in 2003.
