= Doug Taylor (historian) =

Canadian historian (1938–2020)

- Born: June 14, 1938; Toronto, Ontario, Canada
- Died: July 27, 2020 (aged 82); Toronto, Ontario, Canada
- Other names: John Douglas Taylor
- Occupation(s): Historian, teacher, author
- Partners: Ivan Codrington

Doug Taylor (June 14, 1938 – July 27, 2020) was a Canadian historian, professor, author, and connoisseur of movie theatres. In two books, and multiple online articles, Taylor wrote about Toronto's history of beautiful cinemas. He published a history of selected neighbourhoods in 2010, a book on Toronto's lost landmarks in 2018.

Toronto Life magazine and Inside Toronto both profiled Taylor when he published Toronto Theaters and the Golden Age of the Silver Screen. The Toronto Sun's local historian, Mike Filey, used its publication as a jump-off for his own article on Toronto's cinema history.

Taylor's parents immigrated to Canada from Newfoundland, when it was an independent country. Two of Taylor's books are memoirs of his experience growing up in an immigrant family.

Liz Braun, the Toronto Sun's long-term film reviewer, endorsed Taylor's books on Toronto cinemas.

Taylor died on July 27, 2020, at the age of 82.

== Publications ==
- Doug Taylor (2008). There Never Was a Better Time: Toronto's Yesterdays. iUniverse. ISBN 9780595899555.
- Doug Taylor (2010). Arse Over Teakettle: An Irreverent Story of Coming of Age During the 1940s in Toronto. iUniverse. ISBN 9781450205306.
- Doug Taylor (2010). The Villages Within: An Irreverent History of Toronto and a Respectful Guide to the St. Andrew's Market, the Kings West District, the Kensington Market, and Queen Street West. iUniverse. ISBN 9781450225250.
- Doug Taylor (2011). The Reluctant Virgin: Murder in 1950s Toronto. iUniverse. ISBN 9781462046478.
- Doug Taylor (2013). When the Trumpet Sounds. iUniverse. ISBN 9781491708705.
- Doug Taylor (2014). Toronto Theaters and the Golden Age of the Silver Screen. The History Press. ISBN 9781626194502.
- Doug Taylor (2016). Toronto's Local Movie Theatres of Yesteryear: Brought Back to Thrill You Again. Dundurn Press. ISBN 9781459733428.
- Doug Taylor (2016). Toronto Then and Now. Pavilion Books. ISBN 9781910904077.
- Doug Taylor (2018). Lost Toronto. Pavilion Books. ISBN 9781911595038.
