= Broadway Rastus =

Broadway Rastus may refer to:

- Broadway Rastus (revue), a theatrical show by Irvin Miller
- Pseudonym used by Frank Melrose
