= Broadway Records =

Broadway Records has been the name of three otherwise unrelated American record labels:

- Broadway Records (1920s), founded in the early 1920s in Bridgeport, Connecticut
- Broadway Records (1947), founded in 1947 in Los Angeles
- Broadway Records (2012), founded in 2012
