= Allan Broadway =

Australian rules footballer

Personal information
- Full name: George Allan Broadway
- Born: 4 December 1921; Footscray, Victoria
- Died: 27 July 1997 (aged 75)
- Original team: Yarraville
- Height: 183 cm (6 ft 0 in)
- Weight: 77 kg (170 lb)

Playing career^{1}
Years	Club	Games (Goals)
1945–1946	Footscray	16 (13)
1946	Fitzroy	3 (2)
Total		19 (15)
- ^{1} Playing statistics correct to the end of 1946.

George Allan Broadway (4 December 1921 – 27 July 1997) was an Australian rules footballer who played with Footscray and Fitzroy in the Victorian Football League (VFL).

== Career ==
Broadway, a forward, played for Yarraville in the Victorian Football Association before the Second World War. During the war, he served as a private in the Australian Army Service Corps. He made 13 appearances for Footscray in the 1945 VFL season and kicked 12 goals. During the 1946 season he attempted to join Camberwell and St Kilda, before being cleared to Fitzroy.

In 1947 he joined Terang as playing coach. He coached Coleraine to a premiership in 1948, the first of his two years leading the club, then left to coach Stratford in 1950. After two years coaching Stratford, Broadway was cleared to another Gippsland club Maffra, as a player.

While a spectator at a cricket match in Stratford in the summer of 1952, Broadway was one of six people struck by lightning. He suffered burns but was not required to go to hospital.
