= Broadway, Durban =

- Location within KwaZulu-Natal Location within South Africa
- Coordinates: 29.7765°S 31.0452°E
- Country: South Africa
- Province: KwaZulu-Natal
- Municipality: eThekwini

Area
  - Total: 5.18 km^{2} (2.00 sq mi)

Population (2011)
  - Total: 9,724
  - Density: 1,880/km^{2} (4,860/sq mi)

Racial makeup (2011)
  - Black African: 16.3%
  - Coloured: 2.2%
  - Indian/Asian: 12.0%
  - White: 68.7%
  - Other: 0.8%

First languages (2011)
  - English: 81.6%
  - Zulu: 8.4%
  - Afrikaans: 5.5%
  - Other: 4.5%
- Time zone: UTC+2 (SAST)
- Postal code (street): 4051
- Area code: 031

Broadway, Durban is a residential area in northern Durban, KwaZulu-Natal, South Africa.
