= Westminster Presbyterian Church (Sacramento, California) =

United States historic place

- U.S. National Register of Historic Places
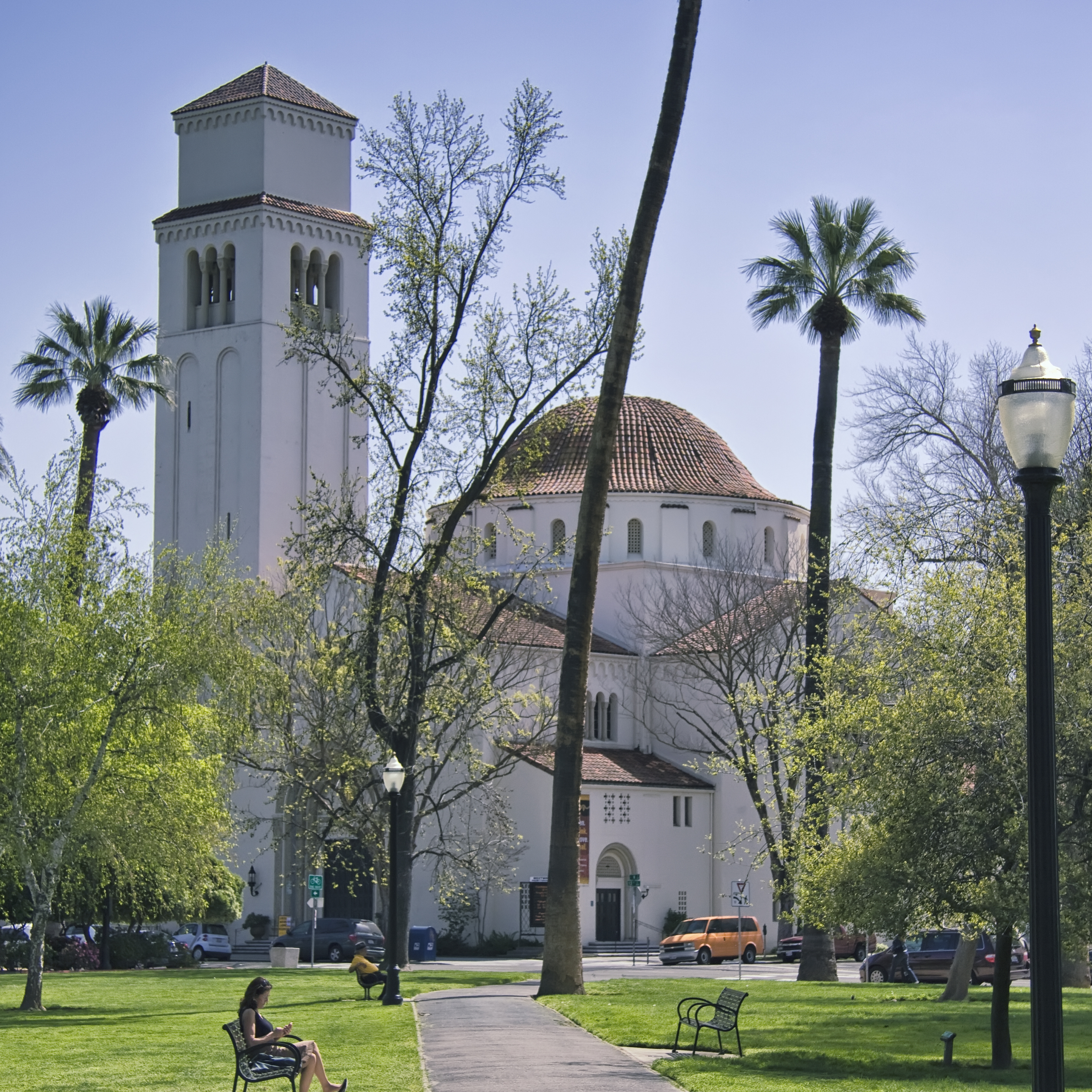
- Westminster Presbyterian Church with bell tower and tiled dome.

- Location within Sacramento, California Location within California Location within the United States
- Location: 1300 N St., Sacramento, California
- Coordinates: 38°34′27.7″N 121°29′27.5″W
- Area: 0.6 acres (0.24 ha)
- Built: 1927
- Built by: Walter Campbell Construction Co.
- Architect: Dean and Dean
- Architectural style: Mission/Spanish Colonial Revival
- NRHP reference No.: 03000425
- Added to NRHP: May 22, 2003

The Westminster Presbyterian Church, located at 13th St. and N Street in Sacramento, California, was built in 1927. It was listed on the National Register of Historic Places in 2003.

It was deemed significant for its architecture. The Presbyterian church was designed in "Spanish Eclectic" style with Byzantine influences as in the Hagia Sophia, by Sacramento architects Dean and Dean. It has a bell tower and tiled dome. It is constructed of reinforced concrete with stucco covering and decorations made of pre-cast cement.

Westminster Presbyterian Church is listed as an American Presbyterian and Reformed Historical Site No. 373 by the Presbyterian Historical Society.

== See also ==
- History of Sacramento, California
- National Register of Historic Places listings in Sacramento County, California
- California Historical Landmarks in Sacramento County, California
