= Mike Filey =

Canadian historian (1941–2022)

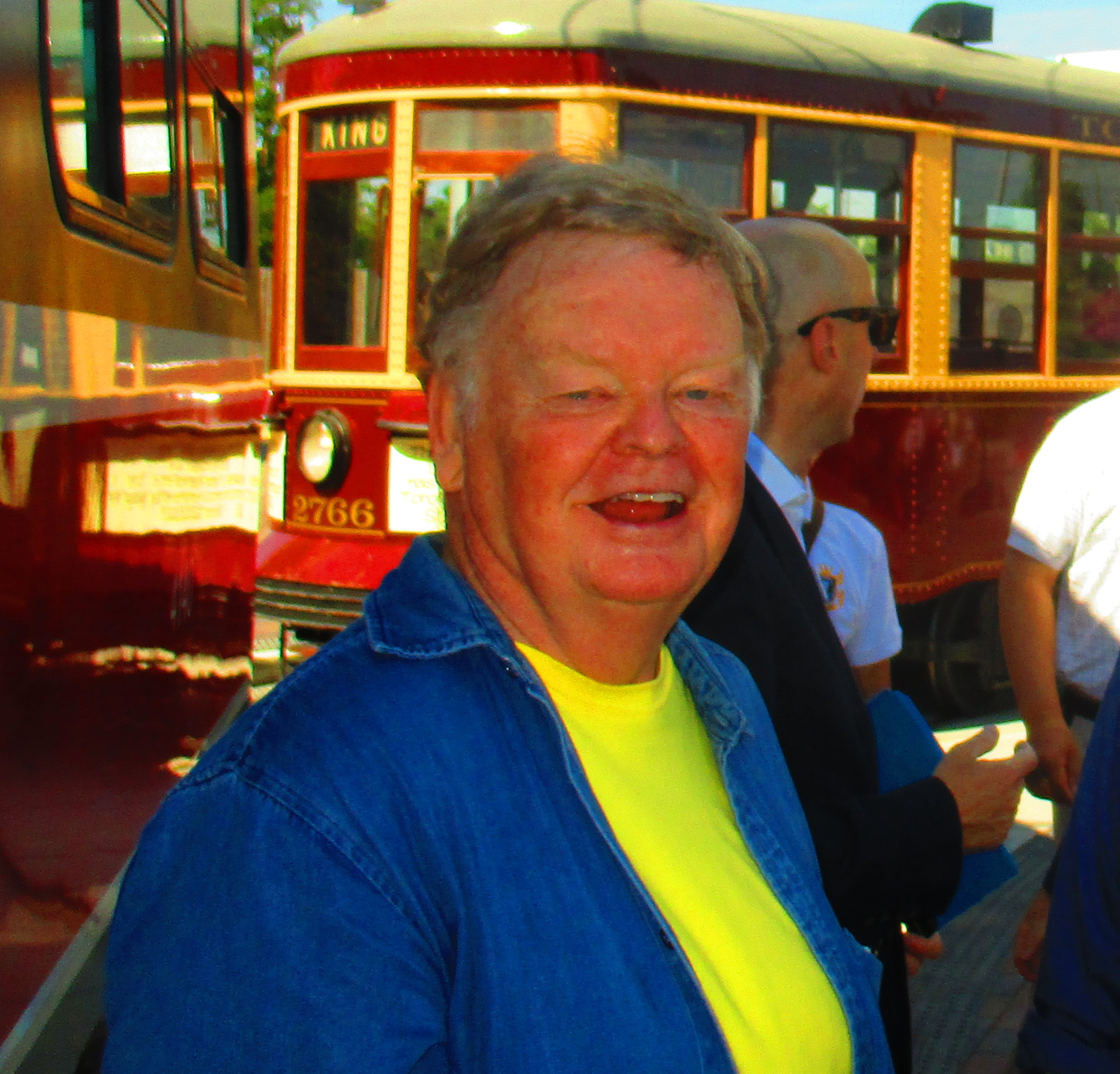
- Filey prior to a ceremony at the Distillery Loop
- Born: October 11, 1941; Toronto, Ontario, Canada
- Died: July 30, 2022 (aged 80)
- Occupation(s): Historian, radio host, author

Mike Filey (October 11, 1941 – July 30, 2022) was a Canadian historian, radio host, journalist and author. He was awarded the Jean Hibbert Memorial Award in 2009 for promoting the city of Toronto and its history.

== Early life ==
Born in 1941 in Toronto, Filey attended high school at North Toronto Collegiate Institute and earned a degree in chemical technology from Ryerson Polytechnical Institute.

As a child, Filey lived with his family on Bathurst Street, just south of the iconic Honest Ed's.

== Career ==
Filey began his career at what is now the Ontario Ministry of the Environment, working there for nine years. He then worked for five years at the Canadian National Exhibition and four years at Canada's Wonderland.

In 1972, Filey was an organizer of Heritage Toronto, a citizen's group interested in Toronto's history. From 1975 to 2020, he wrote the column, The Way We Were for the Toronto Sun.

Filey is the author of more than two dozen books about the history of Toronto. Among the topics covered are the Toronto Transit Commission (TTC), books with old photographs, and twelve books of Toronto Sketches. Over the years, Filey was a regular guest on several radio stations including CFRB, CKFM, and CHFI-FM and hosted his own weekly radio show, Mike Filey's Toronto, on Zoomer Radio 740. His guided walks included topics such as Toronto, Then and Now.

According to his friend Alan Parker, another columnist at the Toronto Sun, Filey has been called "Toronto's best-known historian". For his love for Toronto, his extensive research, and his "consistent willingness to share his knowledge" in the history of Toronto, he was bestowed the Jean Hibbert Memorial Award by the Etobicoke Historical Society in 2009.

== Personal life ==
Filey lived in Willowdale, Toronto, with his wife, Yarmila. Filey died on July 30, 2022, from prostate cancer.

== Publications ==
- Mike Filey (2019). Toronto: Spirit of Place. Magic Light Publishing. ISBN 978-1894673877.
- Mike Filey (October 24, 2015). Mike Filey's Toronto Sketches, Books 10–12. Dundurn. ISBN 978-1-4597-3545-3.
- Mike Filey (2015). Toronto Sketches 12 : The Way We Were. Dundurn. ISBN 978-1459731691.
- Mike Filey (March 31, 2014). Trillium and Toronto Island: The Centennial Edition. Dundurn. ISBN 978-1-77070-550-0.
- Mike Filey (November 10, 2012). Toronto Sketches 11: "The Way We Were". Dundurn. ISBN 978-1-4597-0765-8.
- Mike Filey (November 16, 2010). Toronto Sketches 10: "The Way We Were". Dundurn. ISBN 978-1-4597-1161-7.
- Mike Filey (October 27, 2008). Toronto: The Way We Were. Dundurn. ISBN 978-1-55002-842-3.
- Mike Filey (April 2006). Toronto Sketches 9. Dundurn. ISBN 978-1-55002-613-9.
- Mike Filey and John McQuarrie (2005). Toronto: A Photographic Portrait. Magic Light Publishing. ISBN 978-1894673198.
- Mike Filey (2004). Dates to Remember: Roads Travelled, Bridges Crossed. Humphrey Funeral Home - A.W. Miles Chapel.
- Mike Filey (2004). Toronto Sketches 8: The Way We Were. Dundurn. ISBN 978-1550025279.
- Mike Filey (2003). Toronto Sketches 7: The Way We Were. Dundurn. ISBN 978-1550024487.
- Mike Filey (September 1, 2002). A Toronto Album 2: More Glimpses of the City That Was. Dundurn. ISBN 978-1-55488-059-1.
- Mike Filey (September 2001). A Toronto Album: Glimpses of the City that was. Dundurn. ISBN 978-0-88882-242-0.
- Mike Filey (2000). Toronto Then & Now. Magic Light Publishing. ISBN 978-1-894673-00-6.
- Mike Filey (2000). Toronto Sketches 6: The Way We Were. Dundurn. ISBN 978-1550023398.
- Mike Filey (June 1999). Mount Pleasant Cemetery: An Illustrated Guide. Dundurn. ISBN 978-1-55002-322-0.
- Mike Filey (April 1998). Discover & Explore Toronto's Waterfront: A Walker's, Jogger's, Cyclist's, Boater's Guide to Toronto's Lakeside Sites and History. Dundurn. ISBN 978-1-55002-304-6.
- Mike Filey (October 1, 1997). The TTC Story: The First Seventy-five Years. Dundurn. ISBN 978-1-77070-079-6.
- Mike Filey (1997). Toronto Sketches 5: The Way We Were. Dundurn. ISBN 978-1550022926.
- Mike Filey; Victor Russell (July 25, 1996). From Horse Power to Horsepower: Toronto: 1890-1930. Dundurn. ISBN 978-1-55488-173-4.
- Mike Filey (October 1, 1996). I Remember Sunnyside. Dundurn. ISBN 978-1-4597-1338-3.
- Mike Filey (1995). Toronto Sketches 4: The Way We Were. Dundurn. ISBN 978-1550022483.
- Mike Filey (1994). Toronto Sketches 3: The Way We Were. Dundurn. ISBN 978-1550022278.
- Mike Filey (September 1, 1993). More Toronto Sketches: The Way We Were. Dundurn. ISBN 978-1-55488-232-8.
- Mike Filey (1992). Toronto Sketches: The Way We Were. Dundurn. ISBN 978-1-55002-176-9.
- Mike Filey (1989). Like No Other in the World: The Story of Toronto's SkyDome. Sun Controlled Ventures. ISBN 978-0-919233-31-7.
- Mike Filey (1989). Toronto Flashbacks 1: A Postcard Book of 30 Black and White Historical Photographs. Firefly. ISBN 9780920668610.
- Mike Filey (1989). Toronto Flashbacks 2: A Postcard Book of 30 Black and White Historical Photographs. Firefly. ISBN 9780920668627.
- Mike Filey (1986). Not a One-horse Town: 125 Years of Toronto and Its Streetcars. Mike Filey. ISBN 978-0-9691501-1-4.
- Mike Filey (1983). A Toronto Almanac : Things Typical, Topical & Trivial about Toronto : in Celebration of Toronto's 150th Anniversary. M. Filey. ISBN 978-0-9691501-0-7.
- Mike Filey (1979). Toronto City Life: Old and New. Nelson, Foster & Scott. ISBN 978-0-919324-40-4.
- Mike Filey (1977). Wish You Were Here: Great Postcards of Early Toronto. Greey De Pencier. ISBN 978-0919872356.
- Mike Filey, Richard Howard and Helmut Weyerstrahs (1974). "Passengers Must Not Ride on Fenders"; A Fond Look at Toronto: Its People, Its Places, Its Streetcars. Green Tree Publishing.
- Mike Filey (1974). Toronto: The Way We Were: A Collection of Photos & Stories About North America's Greatest City. Nelson, Foster, & Scott Ltd. ISBN 0-919324-22-3.
- Mike Filey (1972). Toronto: Reflections of the Past. Nelson, Foster, & Scott Ltd. ISBN 978-0919324121.
- Mike Filey, Pierre Berton, John Robert Colombo, Ron Haggart, William Kilbourn, Robert McMann, Douglas Richardson and Anthony Adamson (1972). The Open Gate; Toronto Union Station. Peter Martin Associates. ISBN 9780887780721.
- Mike Filey (1971). Look at Us Now. Toronto Telegram.
- Mike Filey (1970). A Toronto Album: Glimpses of the City That Was. University of Toronto Press. ISBN 978-0802017376.
