= Curtis Park, Sacramento, California =

Curtis Park
- Neighborhood of Sacramento
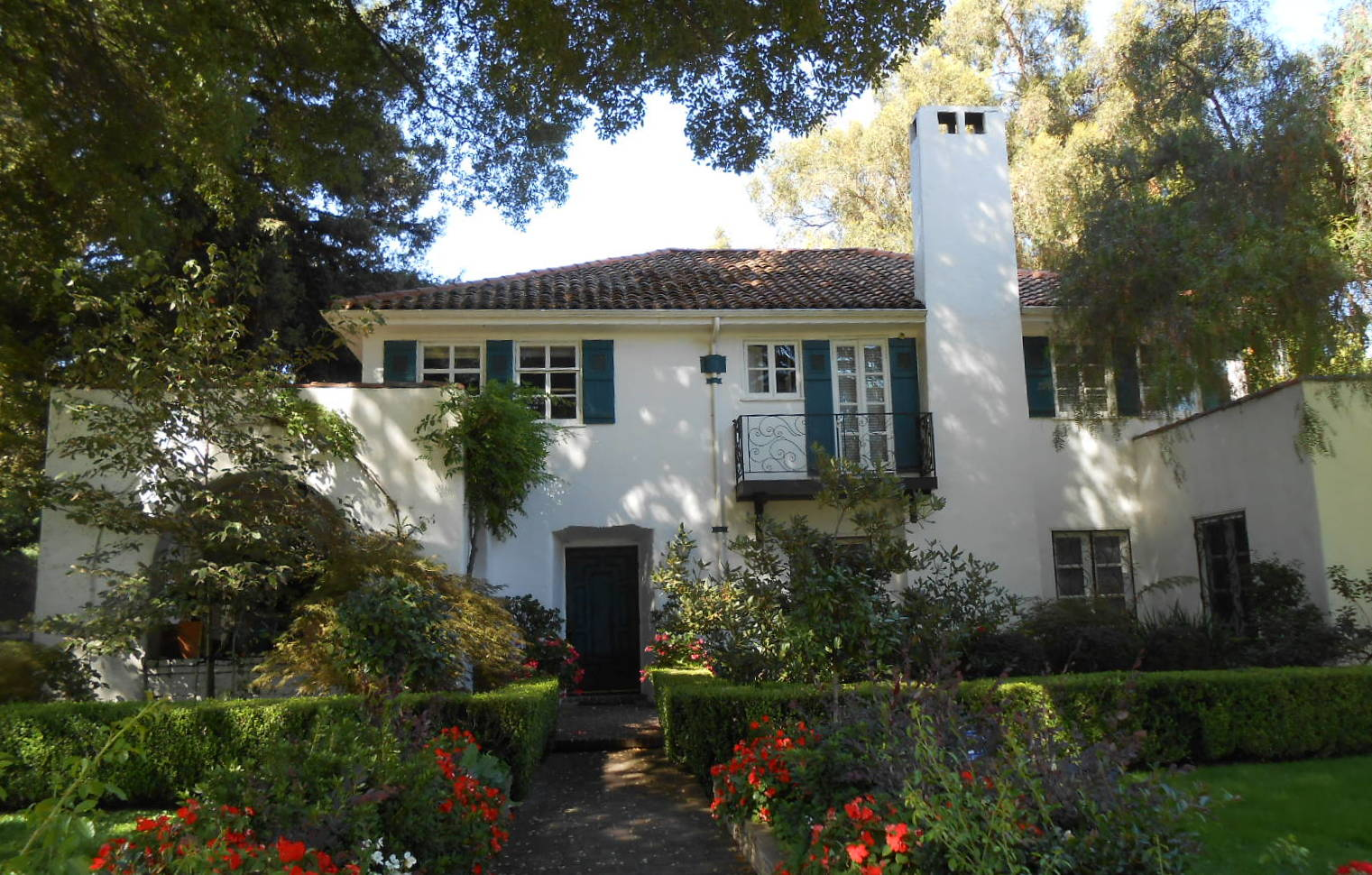
- J. C. Carly House

- Location within Sacramento
- Coordinates: 38.54548°N 121.47922°W
- Country: United States
- State: California
- County: Sacramento
- City: Sacramento
- ZIP Code: 95818

Curtis Park is a neighborhood located within the city of Sacramento, California. Curtis Park is defined as north of Sutterville Road, south of Broadway, east of Freeport Boulevard, and west of Highway 99. Curtis Park is a largely residential neighborhood. It is known for its charming vintage homes including Victorian, Bungalow, and 1920s revival style subdivisions. Information about the neighborhood can be obtained from the Sierra Curtis Neighborhood Association.

== Utility providers ==
- Water, Sewer, Garbage - City of Sacramento
- Electric - SMUD
- Natural Gas - PG&E

== Notable residents ==
Traditionally one of the more well-to-do neighborhoods in the city proper, Curtis Park has been home to many people of note, including:

- Ray Eames – Childhood home of the designer
- Roger Dickinson – Assemblyman
- Kevin Johnson – Former NBA star and mayor of Sacramento
- Dave Jones – California Insurance Commissioner, former State Assemblyman & Sacramento City Councilmember
- Gloria McLeod – California State Senator from Chino; keeps a home in Curtis Park
- Raphael Saadiq – Musician
- Joe Serna – The late mayor of Sacramento, lived here until his death
