= Broadway station (Sacramento) =

Broadway
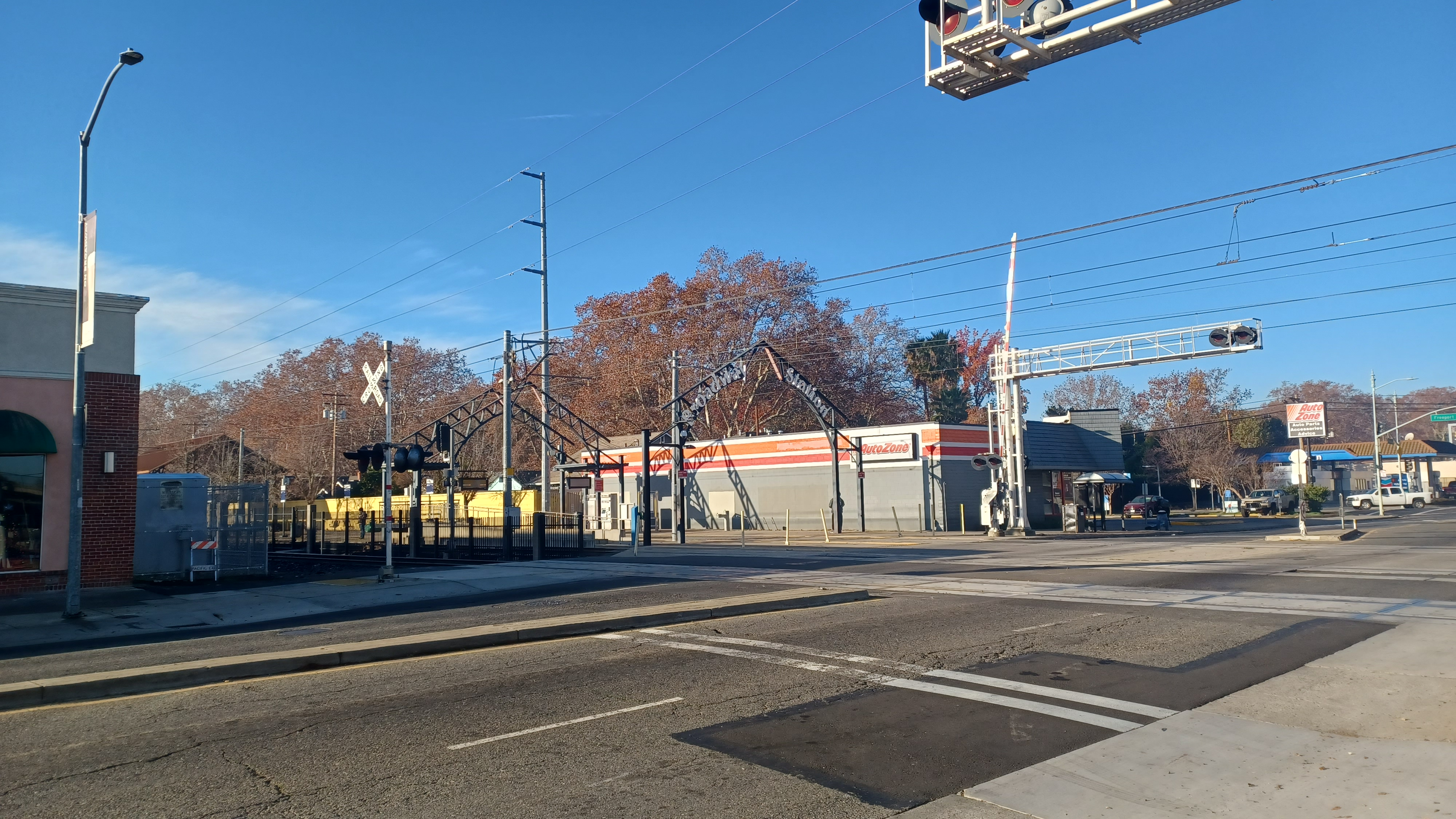
- Station in December 2024

General information
- Location: Broadway at Freeport Boulevard; Sacramento, California; United States
- Coordinates: 38°33′34.65″N 121°29′16.55″W
- Owner: Sacramento Regional Transit District
- Platforms: 1 side platform, 1 island platform
- Tracks: 2
- Connections: Sacramento Regional Transit: 51, 62

Construction
- Structure type: At-grade
- Cycle facilities: Racks
- Accessible: Yes

History
- Opened: September 26, 2003

Services
Preceding station	SacRT	Following station
16th Street toward Watt/I-80	Blue Line	4th Avenue/Wayne Hultgren toward Cosumnes River College
Location

Broadway is a side platformed Sacramento RT light rail station in Sacramento, California, United States, served by the Blue Line. The station was opened on September 26, 2003, and is operated by the Sacramento Regional Transit District. It is located south of Broadway near Freeport Boulevard, and was the initial station of the Phase 1 south side extension. In addition, it is the southernmost station in the Central City service area (the former fare zone).
