= St. Oscar Romero Catholic Secondary School (Toronto) =

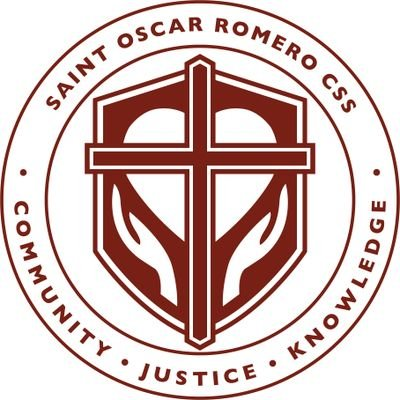

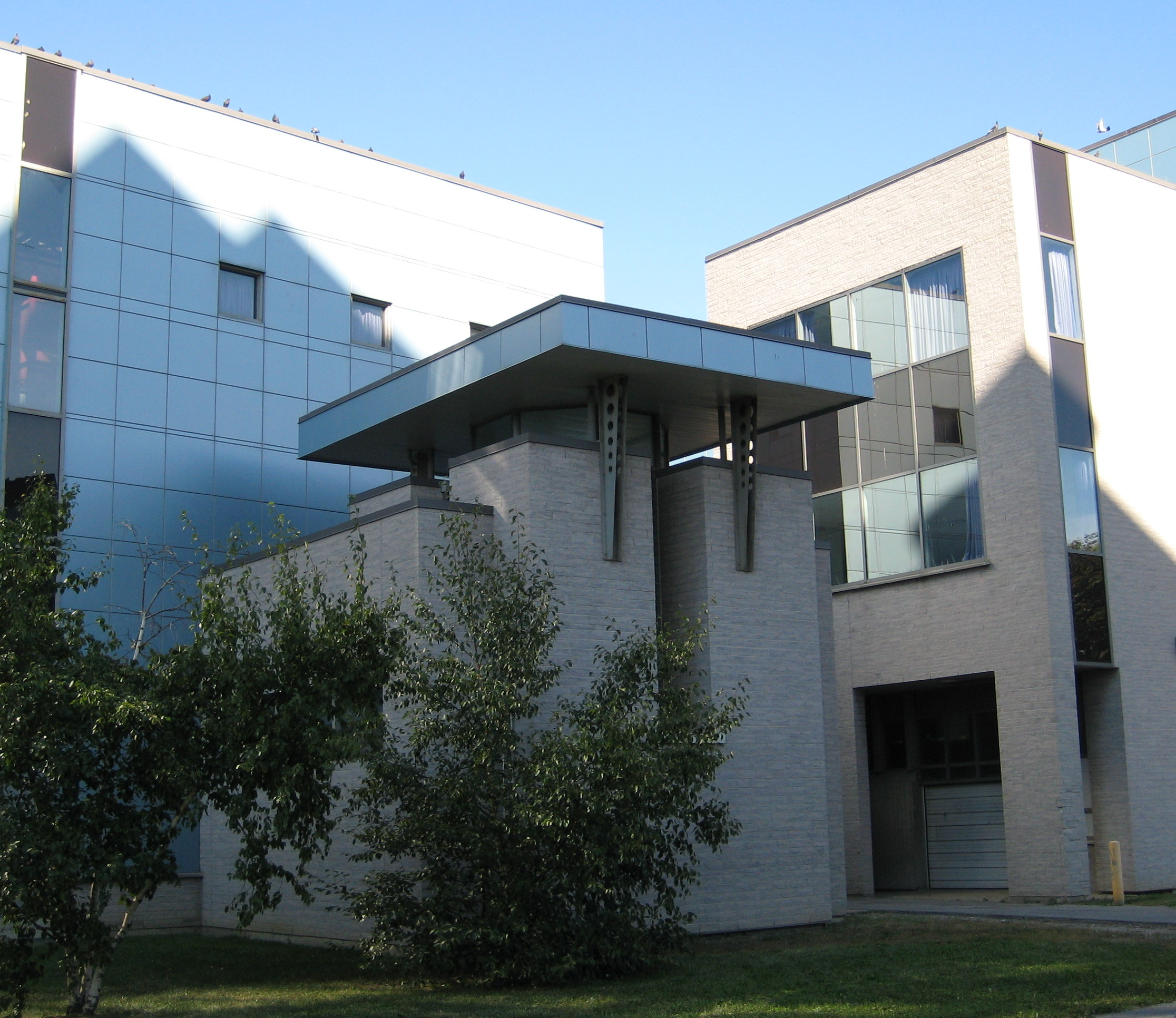

Location
- 99 Humber Boulevard; Toronto, Ontario, M6N 2H4; Canada; 43.680416°N 79.480838°W

Information
- School type: Bill 30 Catholic High School
- Motto: Community, Justice, and Knowledge
- Religious affiliation: Roman Catholic
- Founded: 1989
- School board: Toronto Catholic District School Board (Metropolitan Separate School Board)
- Superintendent: Adalgisio Bria; Area 2
- Area trustee: Daniel Di Giogrio; Ward 10
- School number: 555 / 685550
- Principal: Stephen Carey
- Grades: 9-12
- Enrolment: 753 (2017-18)
- Language: English
- Area: Rockcliffe–Smythe
- Colours: Maroon, Black, White
- Team name: Romero Raiders
- Parish: Our Lady of Victory
- Specialist High Skills Major: Business; Construction; Sports
- Program Focus: Advanced Placement; Gifted
- Website: stoscarromerocss.ca

St. Oscar Romero Catholic Secondary School (acronym as SORCSS, St. Oscar Romero, St. Oscar Romero CSS, or in short Romero) is a Catholic high school in Toronto, Ontario, Canada. It operated as Archbishop Romero Catholic Secondary School until 2015 and Blessed Archbishop Romero Catholic Secondary School until 2018. The school is a member of the Toronto Catholic District School Board, formerly the Metropolitan Separate School Board and is named after Salvadoran archbishop Oscar Romero, who was assassinated in 1980. The school building was opened in 1967 as York Humber High School by the Board of Education for the City of York, later the Toronto District School Board. It has been leased to the MSSB/TCDSB since 1989. St. Oscar Romero's school motto is "Community, Justice, and Knowledge".

== History ==
Throughout the 20th century, Catholic education in the City of York was served by nearby Roman Catholic schools ran by the religious orders: Chaminade College School to the north, Bishop Michael Power for boys and St. Joseph's Islington for girls to the west and Loretto College School to the east. Predominantly, Catholic children in York attended elementary schools in the Metropolitan Separate School Board and later attended public high schools such as York Memorial Collegiate Institute, Vaughan Road Collegiate Institute and George Harvey Collegiate Institute.

When the province extended Roman Catholic high school funding beginning 1985, the MSSB began to search for an existing public school site in York. In May 1988, the Metropolitan Toronto School Board (MTSB) and YBE agreed to lease the York Humber High School on Humber Blvd. On September 7, 1989, York's first Catholic high school, now known as Archbishop Romero Catholic Secondary School, opened its doors to 200 grade 9 students, 18 teachers and three support staff members. The new wing was erected in 1991 and constructions/alterations of the former York Humber building began in November 1992 costing at $12-million. The school was officially opened and blessed on May 7, 1995.

With the namesake beatified in May 2015, the school was renamed to Blessed Archbishop Romero Catholic Secondary School shortly afterwards. After the canonization of Oscar Romero, it was renamed to St. Oscar Romero Catholic Secondary School on October 16, 2018.

== Academics and extra-curricular activities ==
St. Oscar Romero is a semester secondary school from grades 9–12. It offers various academic programs such as English, geography, mathematics, science, civics, history, and technological education at academic, applied or open levels.

Since the turn of 2010, Romero's technological program consists of six computer labs, free Wi-fi, Chromebook and iPad labs, Macintosh lab for the media/communication technology program, and app courses. The school also offers an additional course for Grades 10 to 12 in applications and/or programming. It also has the woodworking shop located in the southwestern side of the school for its construction technology program.

Romero participates in many athletic programs under the "Romero Raiders" banner such as volleyball, basketball, golf, tennis, badminton and baseball as well as intramural sports. In addition, the school also offers many clubs and committees for students such as the Student Council (SAC), Romero Clean-Up, NYH Food Bank, Arts Alive (Romero's art show), Share Christmas BINGO and several other clubs.

== See also ==
- Education in Ontario
- List of secondary schools in Ontario
