= Keelesdale station =

Toronto subway station

Keelesdale
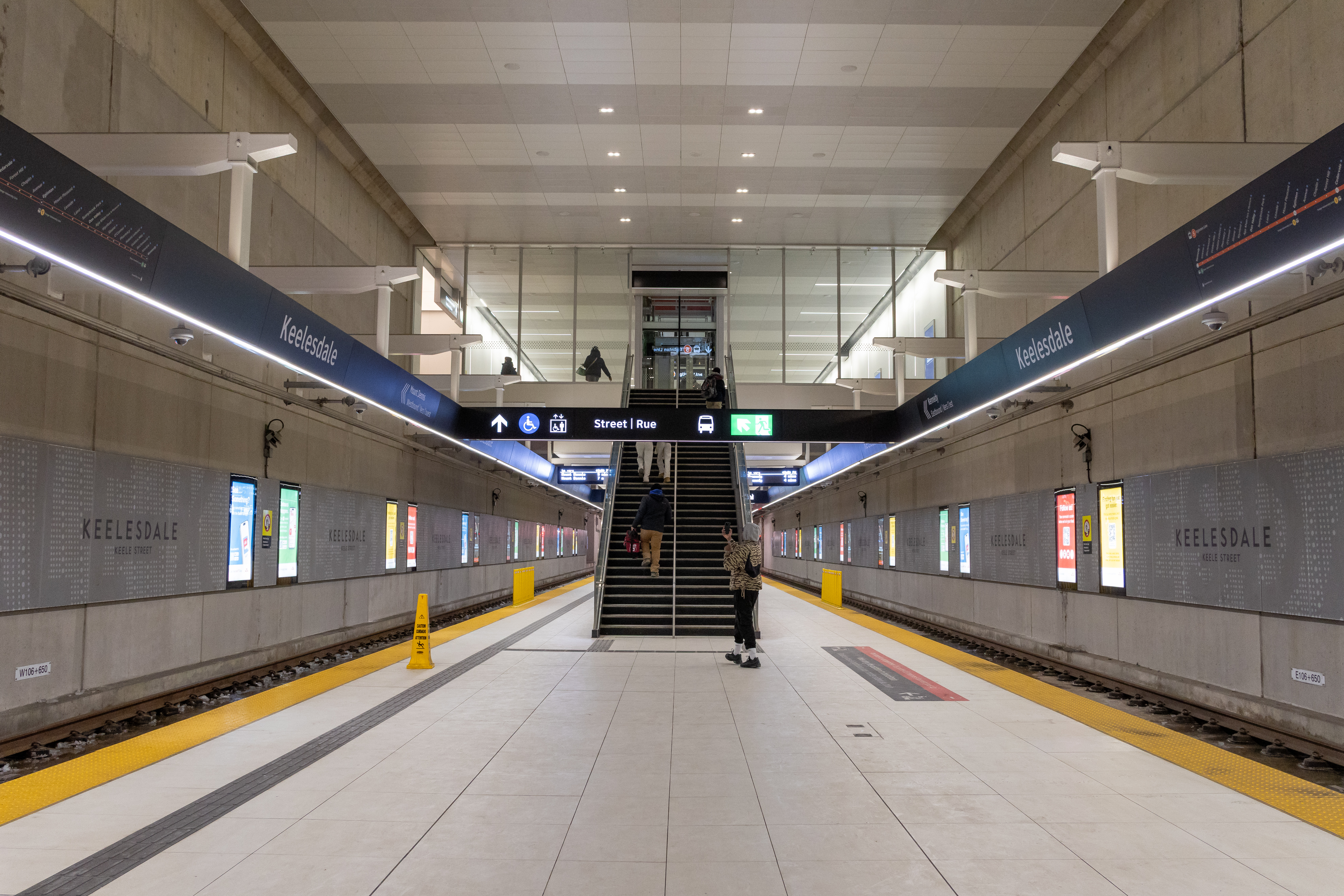
- Keelesdale station platform

General information
- Location: 2620 Eglinton Avenue West; Toronto, Ontario; Canada
- Coordinates: 43°41′25″N 79°28′30″W
- Owner: Metrolinx
- Platforms: Centre platform
- Tracks: 2
- Connections: TTC buses: 34 Eglinton; 41 Keele; 158 Trethewey; 164 Castlefield; 334 Eglinton; 341 Keele; 941 Keele Express

Construction
- Structure type: Underground
- Accessible: Yes
- Architect: Arcadis

History
- Opened: October 12, 2025; 12 months ago (TTC buses); February 8, 2026; 9 months ago (Line 5)

Services
Preceding station	Toronto Transit Commission	Following station
Mount Dennis Terminus	Line 5 Eglinton	Caledonia towards Kennedy
Location

Keelesdale is an underground Toronto subway station on Line 5 Eglinton in Toronto, Ontario, Canada. It is located in the Keelesdale neighbourhood (also known as Silverthorn) at the intersection of Keele Street and Eglinton Avenue. Nearby destinations include the York Civic Centre, Keelesdale Park and Chris Tonks Arena, York Memorial Collegiate Institute, George Harvey Collegiate Institute, and the Silverthorn neighbourhood.

== Description ==
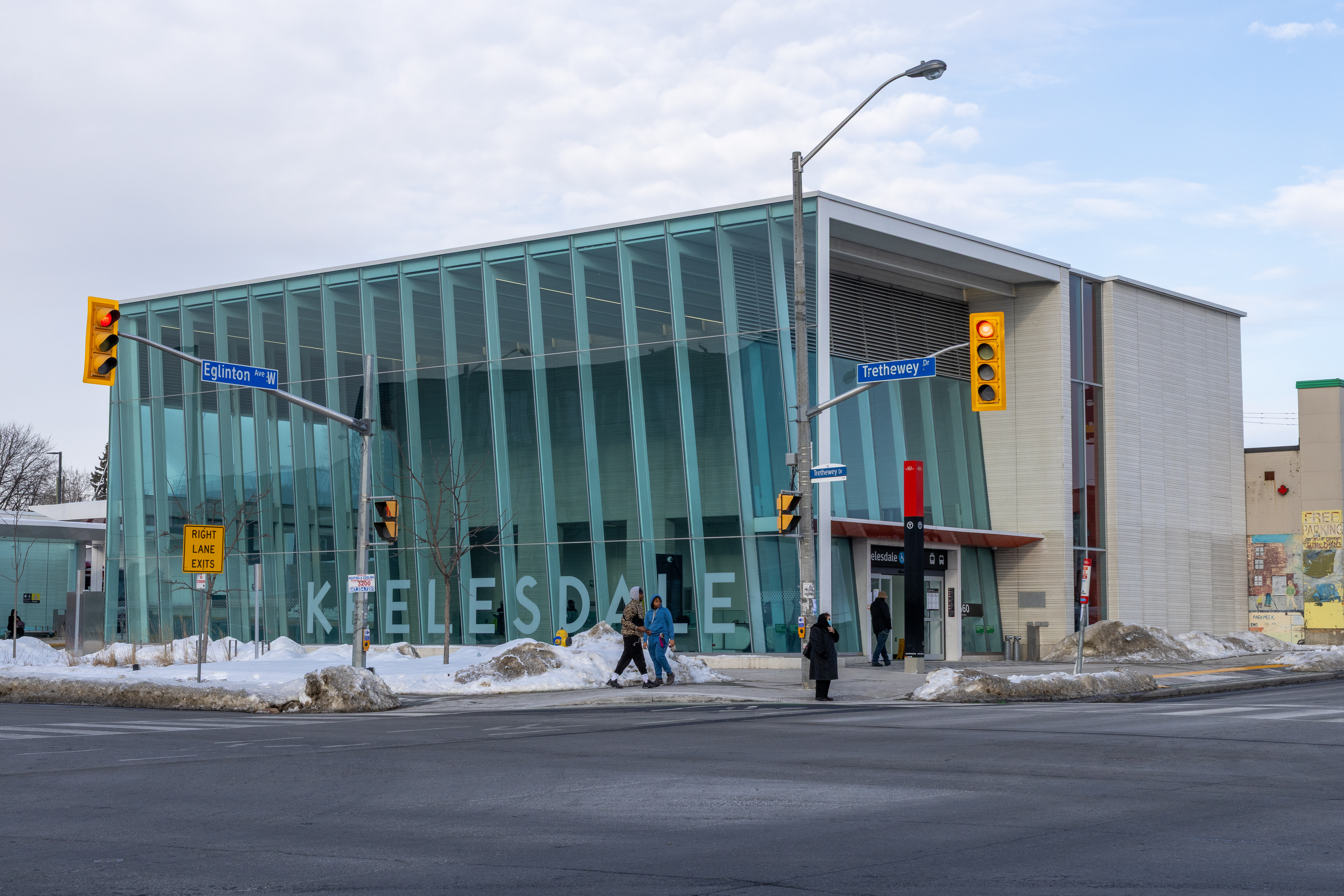
Main entrance to Keelesdale station

The primary entrance and an off-street bus loop are located at the northeast corner of Eglinton Avenue and Trethewey Drive. A secondary entrance is located on the northwest corner of Eglinton Avenue and Trethewey Drive adjacent to York Memorial Collegiate. A third entrance is located at the southeast corner of Eglinton Avenue and Keele Street. The primary entrance is fully accessible and has a station plaza with a landscaped public space. The station has four bus bays outside the fare-paid area plus on-street connections for TTC buses. There is outdoor parking for 60 bicycles.

During the planning stages for Line 5 Eglinton, the station was given the working name "Keele", which is identical to the pre-existing Keele station on Line 2 Bloor–Danforth. In 2015, a report to the TTC board recommended giving a unique name to each station in the subway system (including Line 5 Eglinton). Thus, the station was given the final name "Keelesdale". Silverthorn was also considered.

On March 10, 2016, Ontario premier Kathleen Wynne and Toronto mayor John Tory attended a ground-breaking ceremony at the site of the station, which was the first station of the project on which construction started.

Before construction, land expropriations and demolitions were required. The primary entrance is at the site of former EMS Station 19 and a car wash. The secondary entrance is at the site of a former Coffee Time outlet and its adjacent parking lot.

=== Architecture ===
The station was designed by Arcadis, following an architectural concept designed by architects gh3* from Toronto and Daoust Lestage Lizotte Stecker from Montreal. As with other stations on Line 5, architectural features include natural light from large windows and skylights, steel structures painted white, and orange accents (the colour of the line).

== Surface connections ==
The bus terminal is not within the fare-paid area. The following bus routes serve Keelesdale station:

Keelesdale station surface transit connections
Bay number	Route	Name	Additional information
1	164	Castlefield	Eastbound to Cedarvale station
1	Wheel-Trans		
2	41	Keele	Northbound to Pioneer Village station
2	941	Keele Express	Northbound to Finch West station (Rush hour service)
3	Spare		
4	158	Trethewey	Northbound to Weston Road and Oak Street
N/A	34	Eglinton	Westbound to Mount Dennis station and eastbound to Kennedy station (On-street connection)
N/A	41	Keele	Southbound to Keele station (On-street connection)
N/A	164	Castlefield	Westbound to Mount Dennis station (On-street connection)
N/A	941	Keele Express	Southbound to Keele station (Rush hour service; on-street connection)
N/A	334A	Eglinton	Blue Night service; eastbound to Kennedy station and westbound to Renforth Drive and Pearson Airport (On-street connection)
N/A	334B	Eglinton	Blue Night service; eastbound to Finch Avenue East and Neilson Road via Morningside Avenue and westbound to Mount Dennis station (On-street connection)
N/A	341	Keele	Blue Night service; northbound to York University and southbound to Keele station (On-street connection)

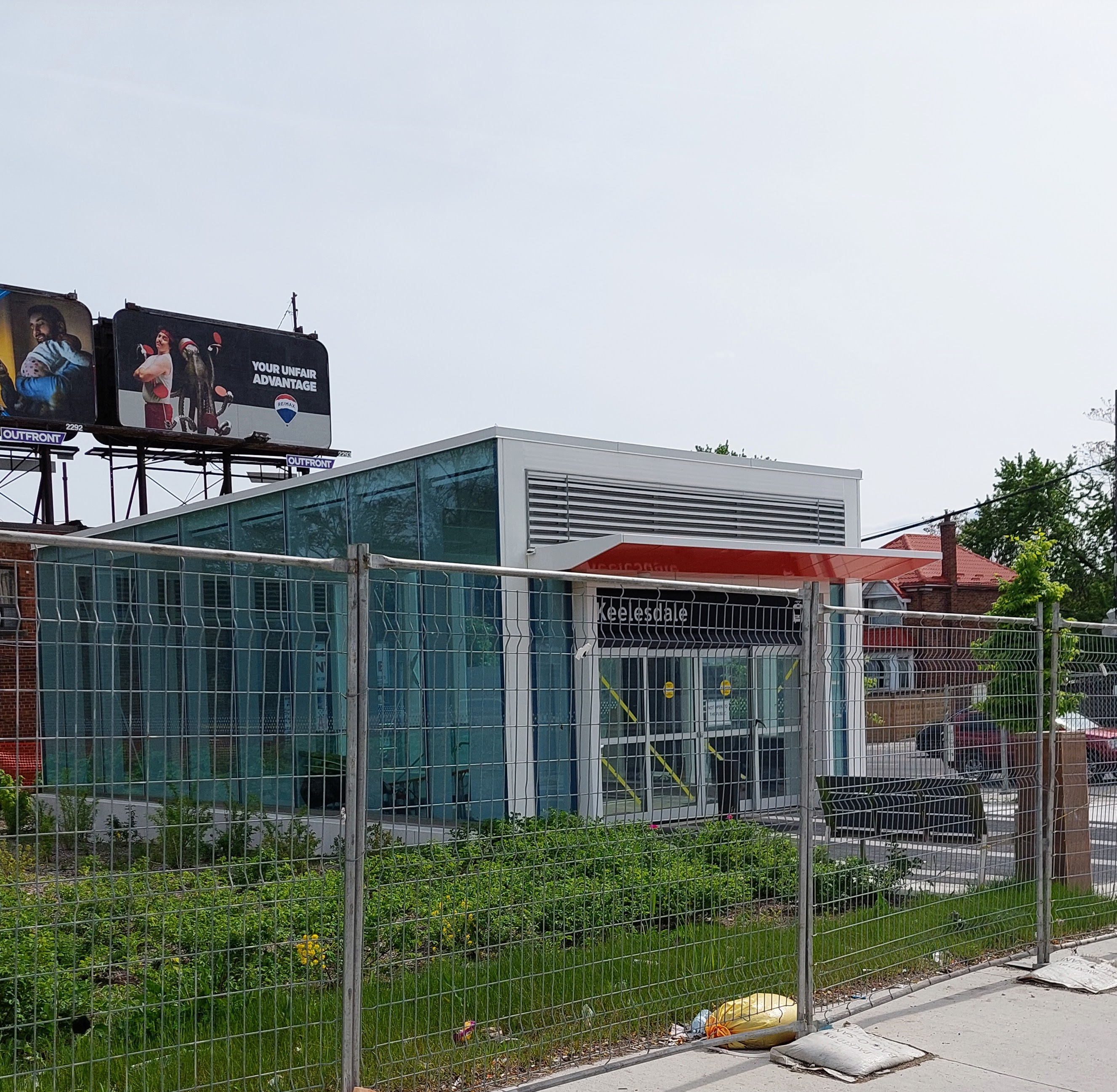
Third entrance in May 2022
