= Silverthorn, Toronto =

Silverthorn
- Neighbourhood
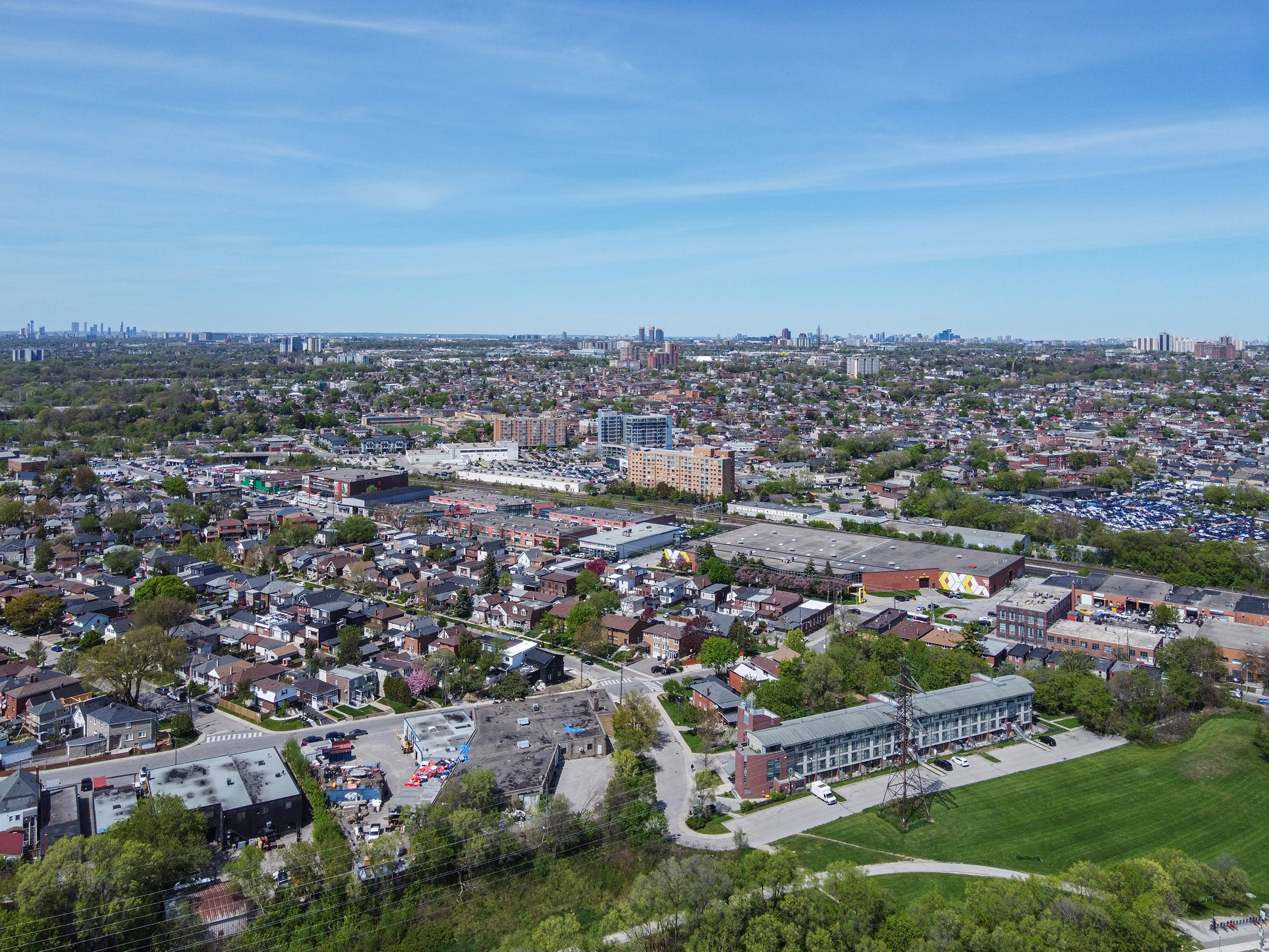
- Aerial view of Silverthorn from Harwood, York in 2024

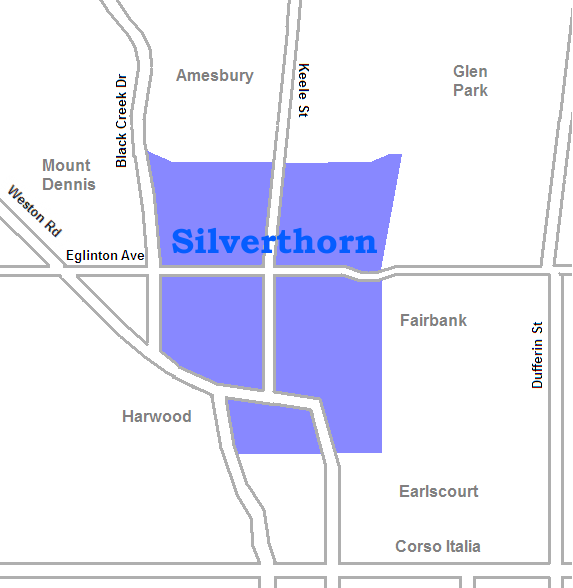
- Vicinity

- Location within Toronto
- Coordinates: 43.690°N 79.476°W
- Country: Canada
- Province: Ontario
- City: Toronto
- Established: 1850 (York Township)
- Changed municipality: 1998 Toronto from York

Government
  - MP: Ahmed Hussen (York South—Weston)
  - MPP: Michael Ford (York South—Weston)
  - Councillor: Frances Nunziata (Ward 5 York South—Weston)

Silverthorn, often misspelled as Silverthorne, is a neighbourhood and former postal village in Toronto, Ontario, Canada. The approximate boundaries are the GO Transit Barrie line railway tracks to the east, Black Creek Drive and the CP railway line to the west and the former boundaries of the City of York to the north and south. The neighbourhood west of Keele Street is known as Keelesdale. For demographic purposes, the city breaks the area down into two neighbourhoods: Keelesdale–Eglinton West, south of Eglinton, and Beechborough–Greenbrook north of Eglinton. It was originally a postal village to serve the then-agricultural York Township.

== History ==
The area's name comes from the Silverthorn family led by John and Esther Silverthorn, who settled in the area north of Dundas Street and east of Etobicoke Creek in 1786. This settlement later became a village called Silverthorn's, and later Summerville.

== Character ==
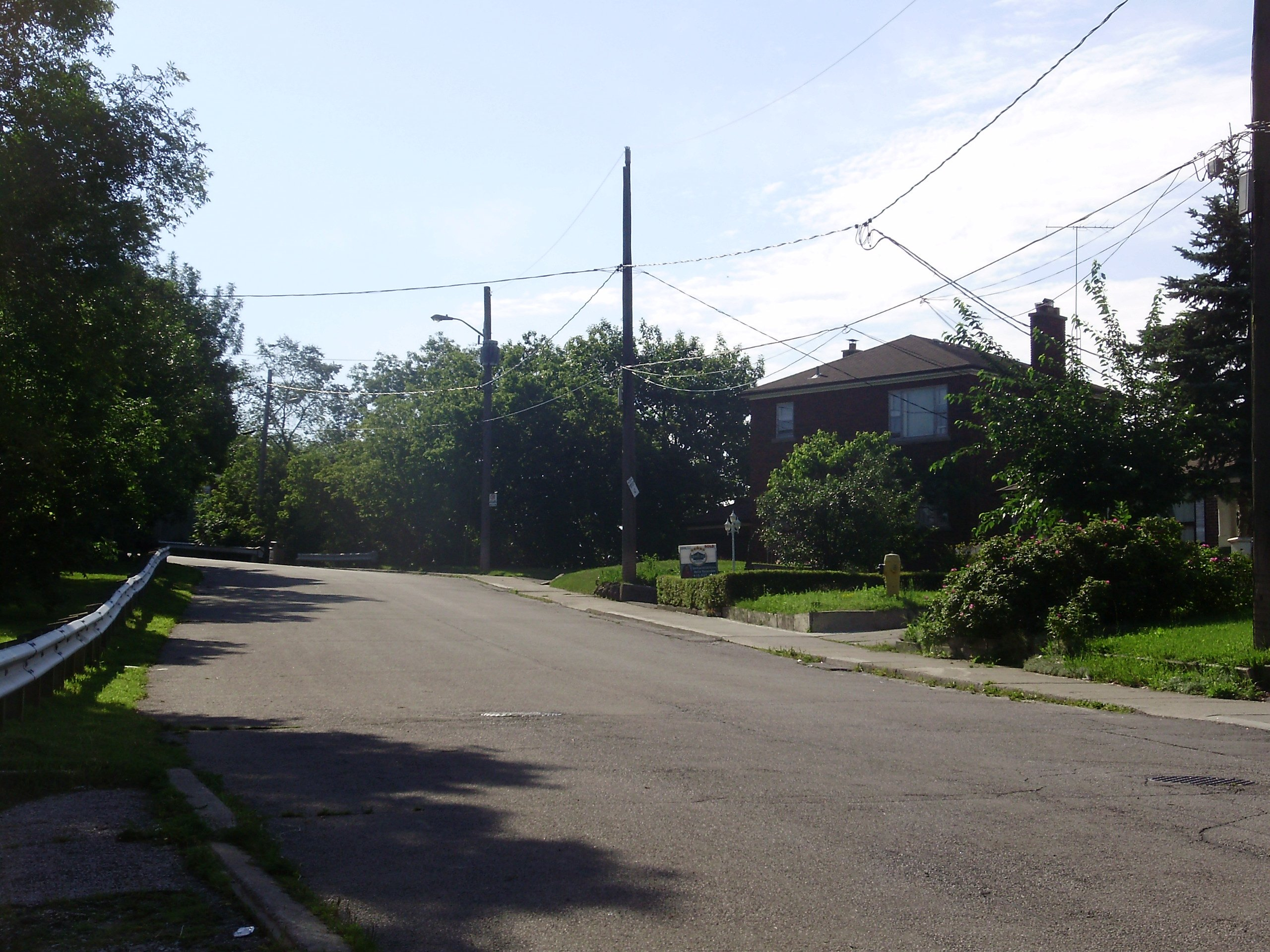
The neighbourhood south of Eglinton Avenue is made up of single-detached homes.

Silverthorn contained the central commercial district for the former City of York along Eglinton Avenue where the York Civic Centre, which housed York's municipal offices, is located.

The area has a large number of Roman Catholics, many of whom are Italian and Portuguese by descent. However, Silverthorn is very diverse and includes many Baptists, Buddhists and other Christians. Latin Americans, Black Canadians, and Southeast Asians are also well represented in this area.

North of Eglinton, nearly two-thirds of the Silverthorn's population resides in rental units, many of them in low-rise apartment buildings. South of Eglinton the area retains its working class character, though the majority of residents are owners (almost 60%). Although the houses are modest, they are also single, detached and owned. There is an above-average contingency of Romance language speakers including Portuguese, Italian and Spanish. This area contains the western end of Eglinton West.

The hilly terrain of Silverthorn is comparable to nearby areas but distinguishable compared with the city, which in general slopes south to the lake. One resident described the topography of the neighbourhood as "Toronto's hidden San Francisco," referring to that city's the famously hilly terrain. Silverthorn's winding and one-way streets make through traffic a non-factor for ball playing.

=== Castlefield Design District ===
The area along Castlefield Road from Kincort Street to just west of Dufferin is home to the interior design district, furniture retailers, home decor centres and Roots Canada.

== Education ==
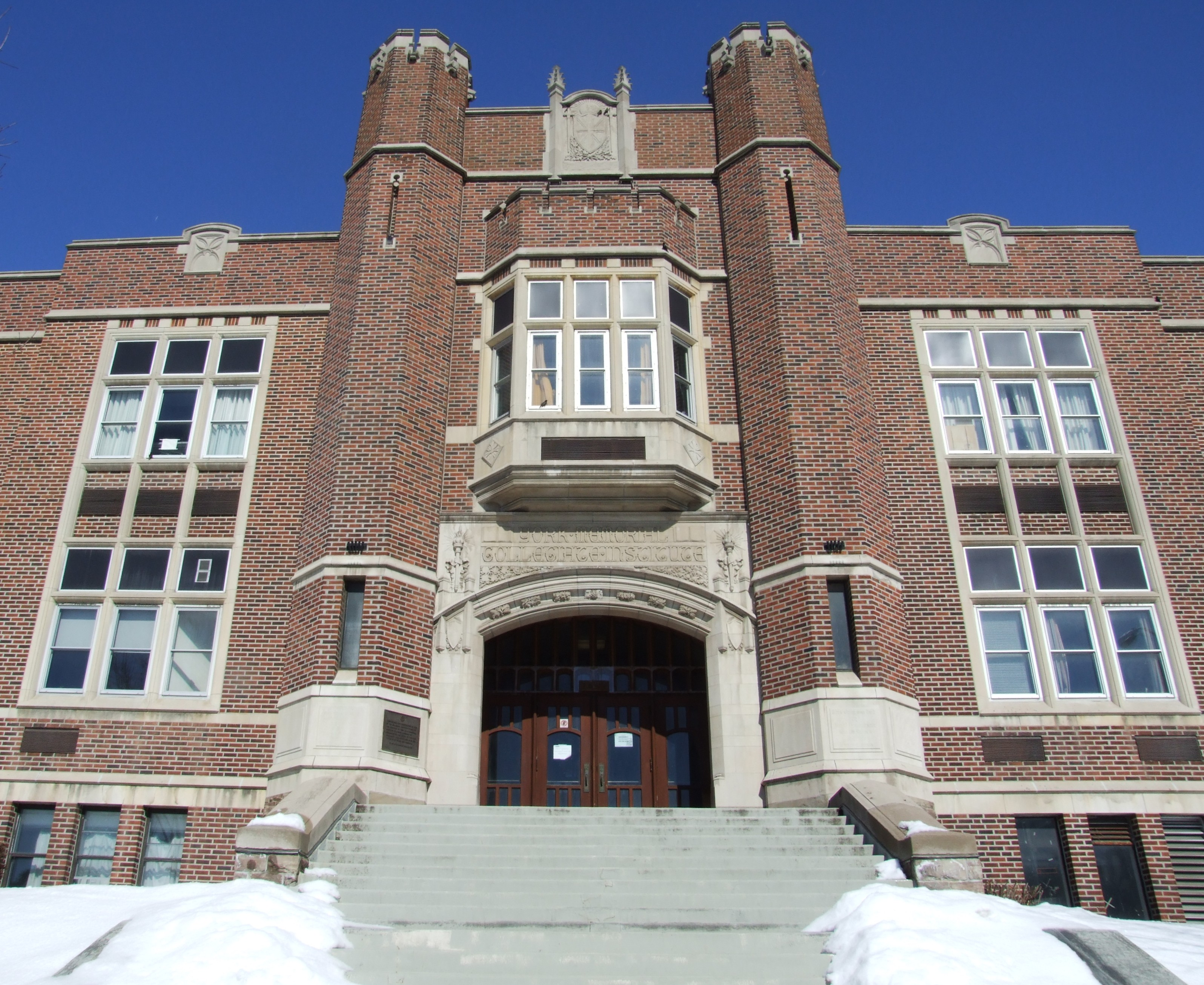
York Memorial Collegiate Institute is a public secondary school operated by the Toronto District School Board.

The Toronto District School Board (TDSB) is an English secular public school board that presently serves the City of Toronto, including Silverthorn. Presently, the school board operates three elementary schools:

- Charles E. Webster Junior Public School — a public elementary school at 1900 Keele Street
- Kane Senior Public School — a middle school at 300 Kane Avenue; renamed Kane Middle School in the mid-1990s; September, 2011 renamed Silverthorn Community School
- Keelesdale Junior Public School

In addition, TDSB operates two secondary schools in the area:

- York Memorial Collegiate Institute
- George Harvey Collegiate Institute

In addition to TDSB, three other public school boards also operate in the city. The Toronto Catholic District School Board (TCDSB) is a public English separate school board; Conseil scolaire Viamonde is a secular French public school board; and the Conseil scolaire de district catholique Centre-Sud is a French separate public school board. However, none of these three operate a school in Silverthorn.

== See also ==
- List of neighbourhoods in Toronto
