= Liberal Party of Canada Rat Pack =

The Rat Pack was the nickname given to a group of young, high-profile provocative Canadian Liberal opposition Members of Parliament during the Progressive Conservative government of Prime Minister Brian Mulroney.

== Origins ==
In the 1984 federal election, the Liberal Party had suffered what was then the worst defeat in its history. In the 33rd Canadian Parliament, the Liberals were in danger of being overshadowed by the New Democratic Party (NDP), which had won almost as many seats as the Liberals.

In the midst of this, a group of young, energetic, and hitherto little-known Liberals soon emerged as a vocal voice of opposition to Mulroney by capitalizing of televised House of Commons proceedings, which was a new medium. They were Don Boudria from eastern Ontario, Sheila Copps from Hamilton, Brian Tobin from Newfoundland, and John Nunziata from the Greater Toronto Area. Tobin had been elected when the Liberals under former prime minister Pierre Trudeau regained power from the Joe Clark-led Conservatives in the 1980 election; the others had retained constituencies that retiring Liberal MPs elected in 1980 had won. The Globe and Mail attributed the name "Rat Pack" to "a newspaper reporter" who was unnamed in 1985.

== History ==
They played roles in ending the careers of several of Mulroney's ministers due to their vocal criticism and sold thousand of t-shirts. The Rat Packers continued to serve as Official Opposition MPs after the PCs won the 1988 election and moved into supporting the government when the Liberals won in 1993.

Boudria, Tobin, and Copps were all appointed to Cabinet at various times during the subsequent ministry of Jean Chrétien.

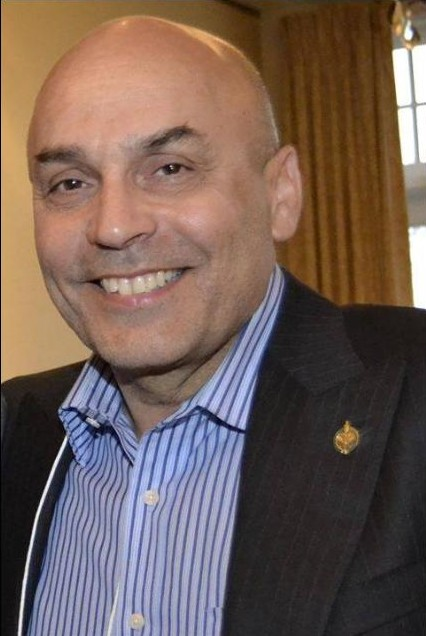
John Nunziata

Nunziata was expelled from the Liberal Party in 1996 for voting against the budget. He then ran—and won—as an independent candidate in the 1997 federal election and then lost to Liberal Alan Tonks in 2000. Tobin left Parliament in 1996 to become leader of the Newfoundland Liberal Party; he served as that province's premier until returning to Parliament in 2000.

Under Paul Martin, who succeeded Chrétien in 2003, Copps and Boudria were relegated to the Liberal backbenches. Tobin had already left Parliament in 2002 in protest of the stranglehold on the Liberal organization by Martin's supporters. In 2004, Copps's riding was merged with that of Martin loyalist Tony Valeri. Copps was narrowly defeated for renomination. The last remaining member of the group, Boudria, had chosen to retire by the time of the 39th federal election in 2006.

== Legacy ==
In 2012, Keith Beardsley called it the most formidable attack machines that question period has ever seen. In 2022, Anthony Wilson-Smith revealed that Brian Mulroney considered that the Rat Pack were “excellent” parliamentarians. When comparing Question Period, Copps found it "mean and nasty — and personal" compared to Rat Pack era where she said that was no personal animosity across both sides in 2023.

Otherwise, the term Rat Pack has been used pejorative. John Baird, Transport Minister in Stephen Harper government, used the term towards Liberal MP Marcel Proulx, who was later embraced by Liberal Geoff Regan in 2009. Beardsley found interim Liberal leader Bob Rae critique on the Harper government antics hypocritical because the Conservatives modelled many of their own Question Period strategies around the antics used by the Rat Pack. After the 2025 election, Raymond J. de Souza writing that despite their entertainment to politics, the Rat Pack had a long-term destructive effect on Canadian democracy and that their antics should be retired. Former federal Liberal cabinet minister and MP Sergio Marchi, expressed regret about the Rat Pack's contribution to the loss of decorum in house by arguing that deepened public cynicism in politics.
