= Rockcliffe–Smythe =

- Neighbourhood
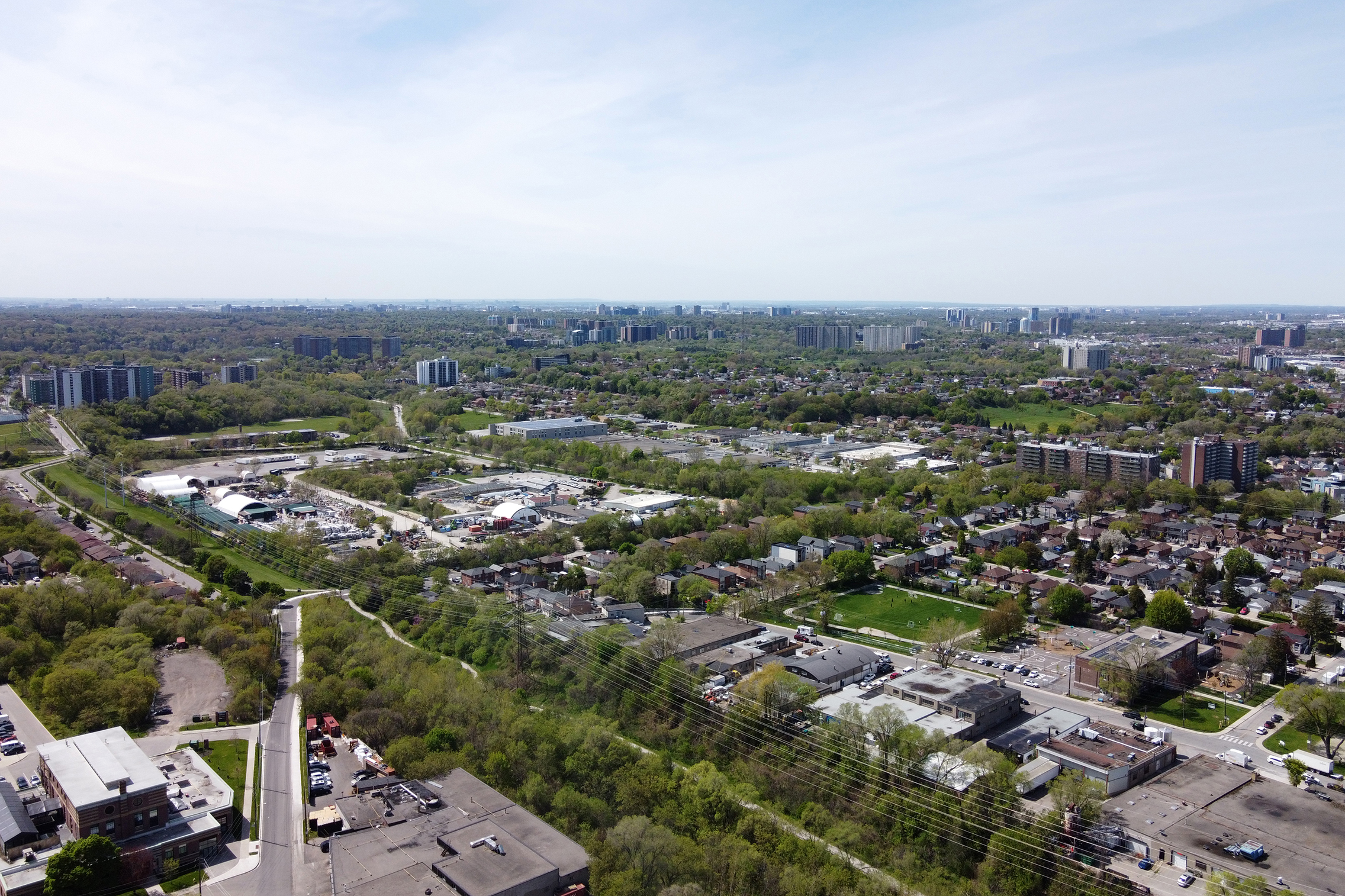
- Residential area in Rockcliffe–Smythe in 2024

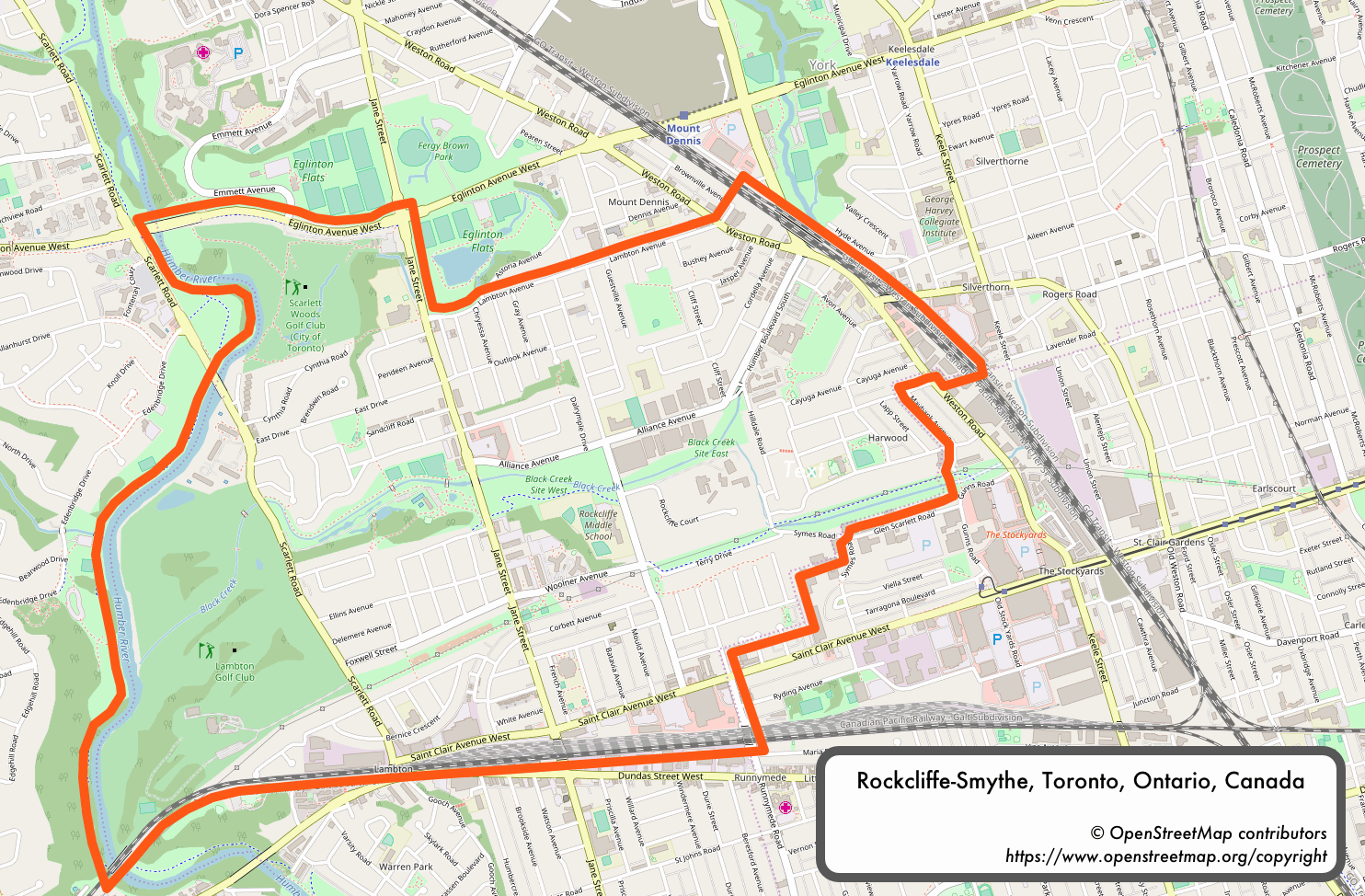

- Location within Toronto
- Coordinates: 43°40′31″N 79°29′19″W
- Country: Canada
- Province: Ontario
- City: Toronto
- Established: 1850 (York Township)
- Changed municipality: 1998 Toronto from York

Government
  - MP: Ahmed Hussen (York South—Weston)
  - MPP: Michael Ford (York South—Weston)
  - Councillor: Frances Nunziata (Ward 11 York South-Weston)

Rockcliffe–Smythe is a neighbourhood in Toronto, Ontario, Canada. It was developed after World War II as part of the urbanization of the former suburb of York Township. It is in Ward 5 (York-South Weston) in the City of Toronto.

As with many neighbourhoods defined by the city, there are often more traditional names for pockets of the city. Directly north-east of Jane Street and St. Clair West is an area called Syme, named after George Syme Reeve of York West. Further to the east (beyond Hilldale road) is another pocket called Harwood. Harwood is bordered by creek in almost all directions.

== Character ==
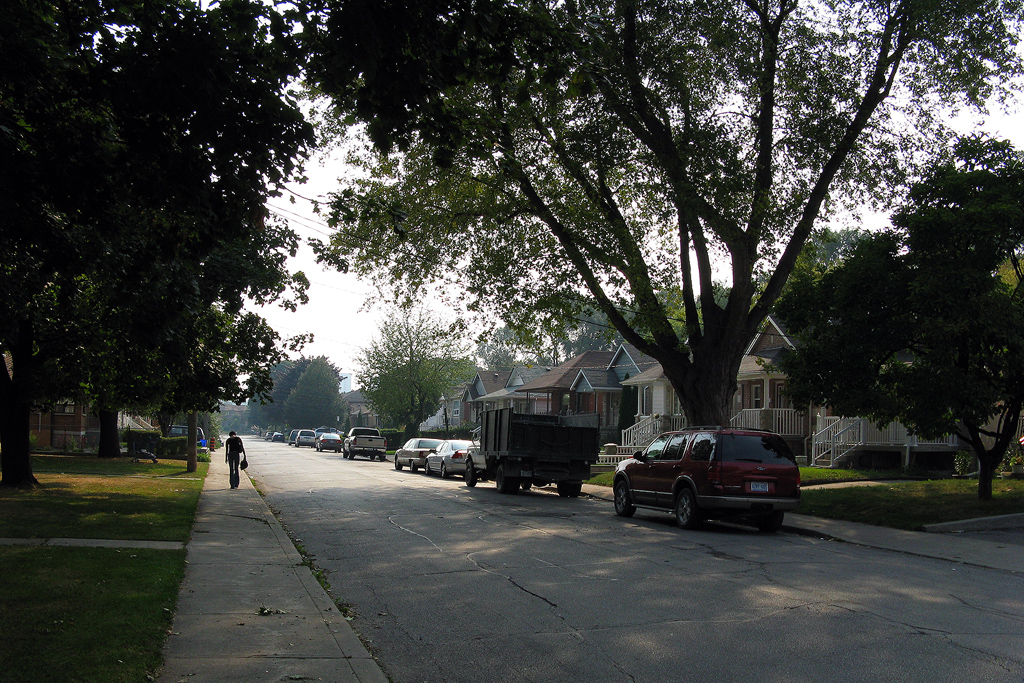
The area is predominantly residential in nature, made up of single-family detached homes.

The area is predominately residential in nature, mostly made up of single-family detached homes. There are apartment buildings along Jane Street, Scarlett Road, and Humber Boulevard. Rockcliffe–Smythe is known for having large amounts of green space including the centrally located Smythe Park. The entire western boundary is green space which includes Lambton Park and Scarlett Woods golf courses. Black Creek meets the Humber in the neighbourhood. The Black Creek enters the neighbourhood from the north-east, travelling through a concrete culvert in the center of Humber Boulevard and through concrete through parks and to the Humber.

In December 2016, Airbnb listed it sixth in its top 17 neighbourhoods to visit in 2017, based on a 497 per cent increase in bookings in 2016. In April, 2015, Toronto Life listed Rockcliffe–Smythe as one of the top three neighbourhoods in Toronto for first time home buyers. “In the last 10 years there have been significant changes.” New retail development, like the Stockyards outdoor mall at the neighbourhood's southeastern corner, has revived some formerly barren lots, and the Junction's hot retail strip is just a short walk south.

=== Boundary ===
Zigzagging from the north-west corner, where the Humber River and Eglinton Avenue West intersect:

- east along Eglinton to Jane Street
- south along Jane to Lambton Avenue
- east along Lambton, crossing Weston Road, to the north-south Mactier Subdivision/Weston Subdivision rail line
- south along the rail line to the former York/Old Toronto border
- following this border, crossing over St. Clair Avenue West, until it reaches the east–west Galt Subdivision railway line
- west along the rail line to the Humber River
- north along the river back to Eglinton Ave W

=== Main streets ===
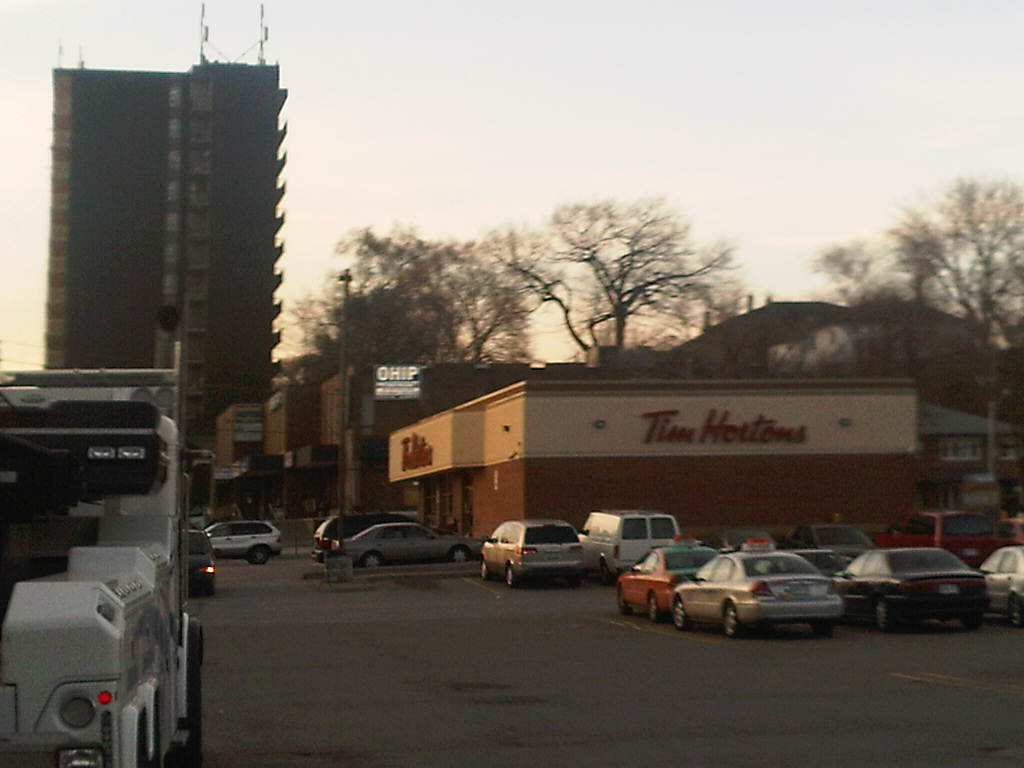
View of Jane Street Plaza on Jane Street, a major north–south four lane arterial road in the neighbourhood.

The area is centered by Jane Street, a north–south four-lane arterial road. To the west, Scarlett Road is another arterial road running northwest from Dundas Street to Eglinton, the northwest corner of the neighbourhood. The central east–west artery from Jane to Weston is Alliance Avenue and Lambton Avenue. To the east, Weston Road is a major four-lane arterial road that runs northwest.

== History ==
Rockcliffe–Smythe was mostly farm land during the 1800s. One of the first large-scale developments in the area was the opening of the Smythe gravel pit in the 1920s, by Conn Smythe. After World War II the gravel pit was used up. This led to the residential development of the surrounding area. Smythe made homes available to returning servicemen and families, losing money on each. The neighbourhood has retained the Smythe name ever since. Smythe Park exists today on the site of the pit and is the site of the Smythe Park Recreation and Community Centre.

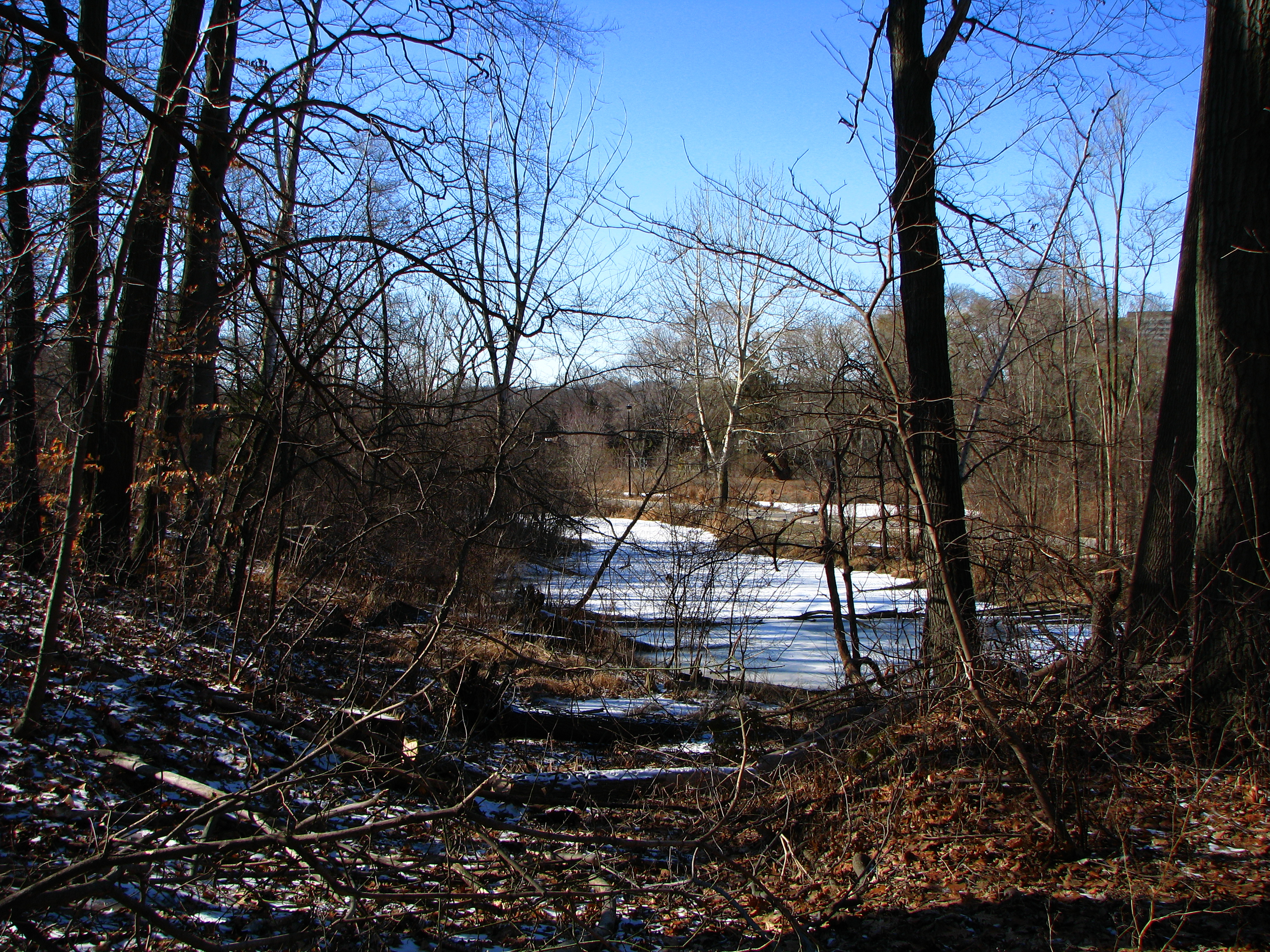
View of Smythe Park during the winter. The park was formerly the home of Smythe's gravel pit.

More recently, Rockcliffe Smythe is re-asserting itself with a spate of new infrastructure developments. The northern part of the area is now within walking distance to Mount Dennis station on the Eglinton Crosstown and the proposed SmartTrack Line. To the east of the neighbourhood is the York Community Centre, opened in 2017. The centre features a double gymnasium, a running/walking track, a six-lane 25-metre indoor training pool, an indoor leisure pool, two multi-purpose rooms, and weight, aerobic and dance rooms.

== Demographics ==
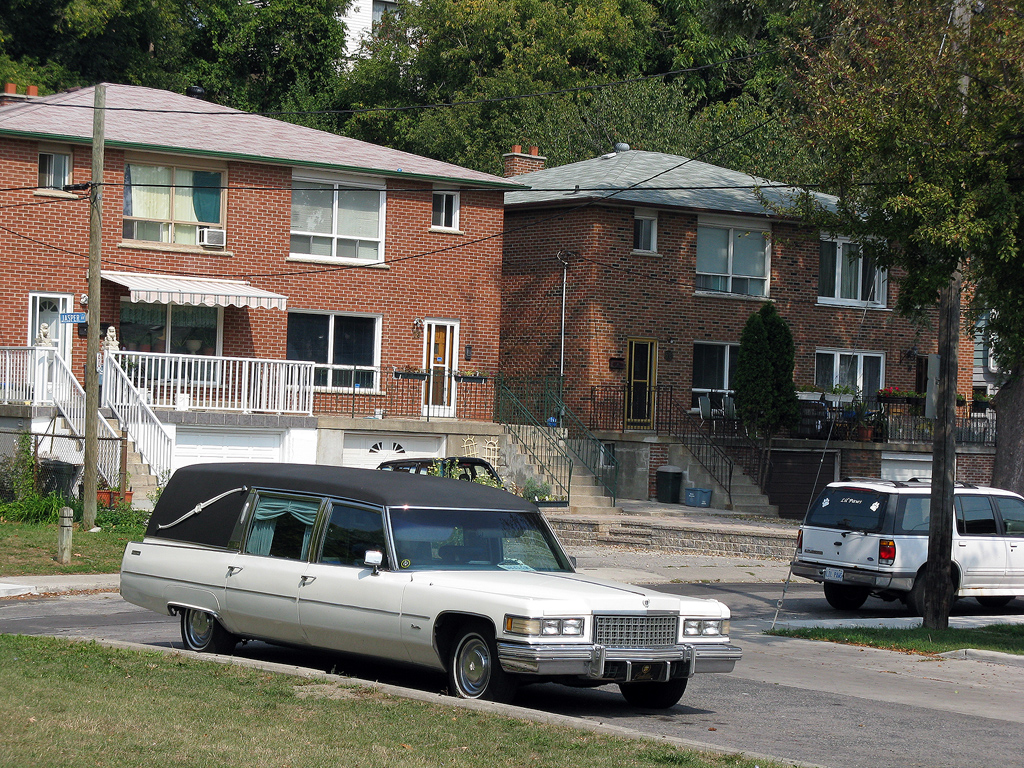
Old housing in Rockcliffe–Smythe

In 2016 there was a total population of 22,246 people. Of which 51.7% were female and 48.3% were male; having an average age of 41.1 years.:

The top 11 languages used at home by residents of Rockcliffe–Smythe were:

1. English: 50%
2. Portuguese: 17.4%
3. Spanish: 12.5%
4. Vietnamese 6.3%
5. Italian 3.8%
6. Tagalog 2.5%
7. Chinese 2.1%
8. Polish 2.1%
9. Somali 1.8%
10. French 1.3%
11. Ukrainian 1.3%

== Education ==
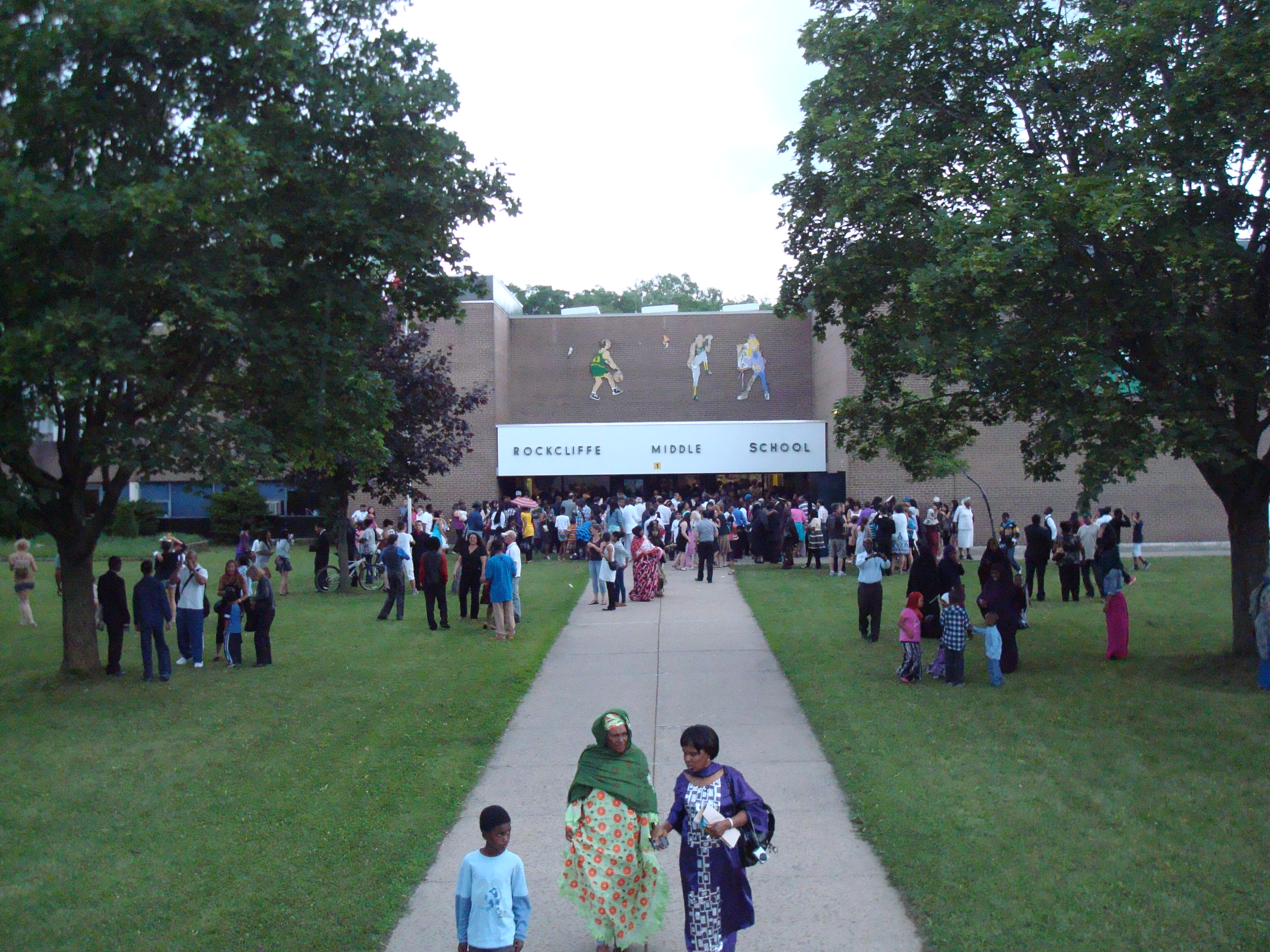
Rockcliffe Middle School is a secular public middle school operated by the Toronto District School Board.

The Toronto District School Board (TDSB) is an English secular public school board that serves the City of Toronto, as well as the Rockcliffe–Smythe. The school board operates a number of institutions that provides primary and secondary education in the area including:

- Cordella Avenue Junior Public School – A public elementary school located at 175 Cordella Avenue, at the end of Black Creek Drive on the west side of Weston Road. It first opened in 1960 and was expanded in 1970 to include additional classroom space.
- The Frank Oke School was originally opened in 1958 as a school for intellectually disabled young male pupils. Today, the school operates grades 9-12 and has well-structured academic and life skills vocational programs.
- George Syme Community School is a large public elementary school on Pritchard Avenue, near Jane Street and St. Clair Avenue. The original four-room George Syme School opened in 1909 and was replaced by the current building in 1970. It is a shared use facility, and is also home to adult ESL classes, the Syme-Woolner Neighbourhood and Family Centre, George Syme Daycare, International Language Programs and Escuela Pioneros de la Paz. The school celebrated its centennial in 2009.
- Harwood Public School is a public elementary school located on Leigh Street, off McCormack Street, west of Weston Road. It was founded in 1928.
- Lambton Park Community School, a K-6 public school located at 50 Bernice Crescent.
- Rockcliffe Middle School is a middle school for grade 6-8 students, on Rockcliffe Boulevard, close to the intersection of Jane Street and St. Clair.
- Roselands Junior Public School is a public elementary school located south of Eglinton Avenue on Jane Street. The school celebrated its 75th anniversary in 1997 and has gained a reputation for "Excellence in Education". The school is wheelchair accessible with handicapped parking spaces located close to the building.

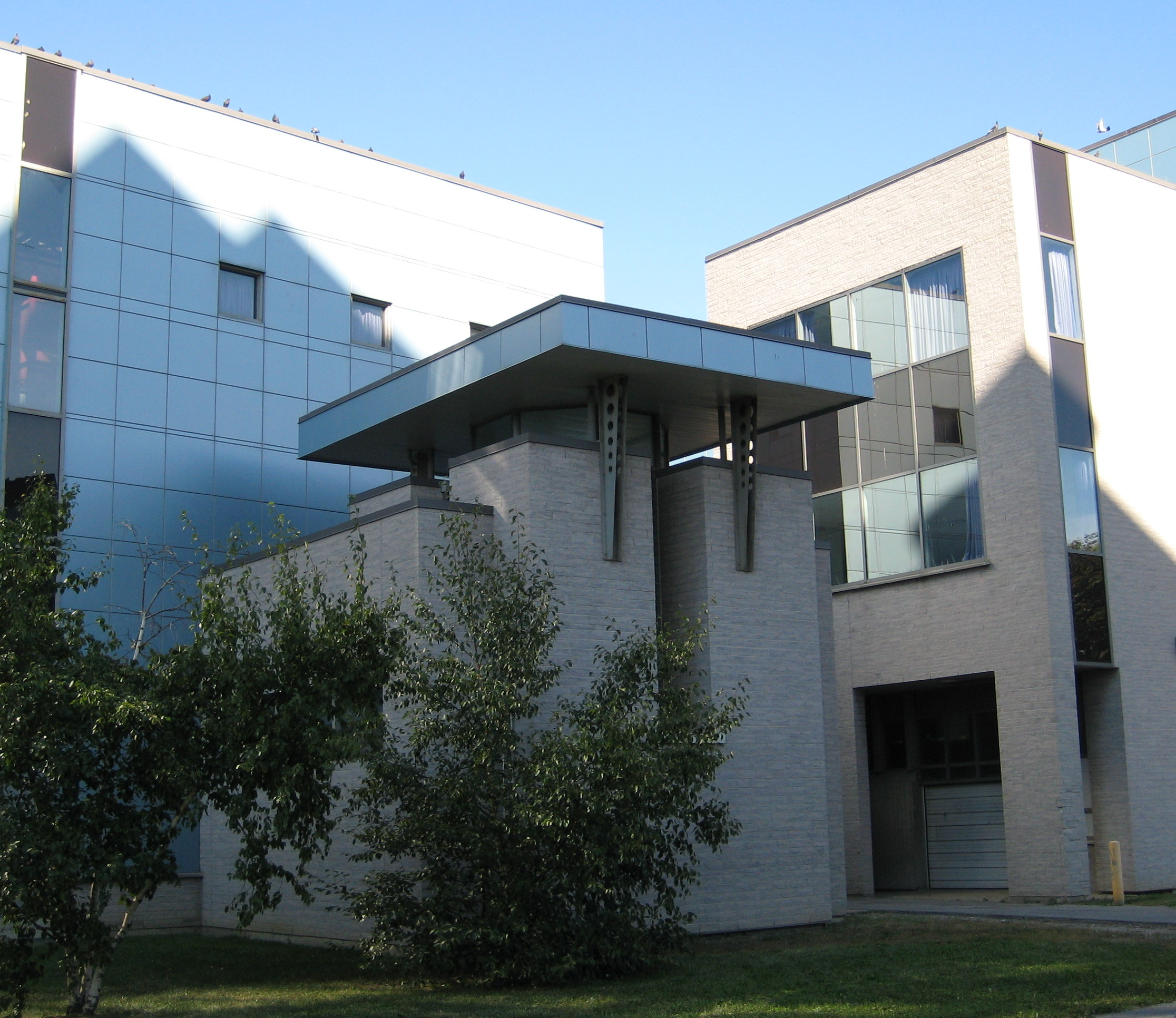
St. Oscar Romero Catholic Secondary School is a public separate secondary school operated by the Toronto District Catholic School Board.

The Toronto District Catholic School Board (TDCSB) is a public English separate school board that serves the City of Toronto, as well as the Rockcliffe–Smythe. The school board operates a number of institutions that provides primary and secondary education in the area including:

- St. Oscar Romero Catholic Secondary School – A Catholic high school located on Humber Boulevard. Established in 1989 as the first Catholic high school in the City of York. It was previously called York Humber Secondary School. November 1992 marked the start of a $12-million construction project that transformed the original building into a state-of-the-art facility. At a special ceremony on May 7, 1995, the school was officially opened and blessed.
- Santa Maria Catholic School is a Catholic elementary school located on Avon Avenue just west of Weston Road and south of Humber Boulevard.
- Our Lady of Victory Catholic School is a Catholic elementary school located on Guestville.

In addition to TDSB and TDCSB, two French public school boards also operate in the city. The Conseil scolaire Viamonde is a secular French public school board; and the Conseil scolaire de district catholique Centre-Sud is a French separate public school board. However, the two French school boards operate a school in the Rockcliffe–Smythe neighbourhood.

== Transportation ==
The area is served by Toronto Transit Commission bus lines that connect to the Bloor-Danforth subway line. Main routes include the Route 35 along Jane Street to Jane subway station, route 71 and 79 Scarlett Road along Runnymede Road, and the Route 89 Weston bus line that runs along Weston Road to Keele subway station. Lastly, the 161 Rogers Road loops within the neighbourhood and goes to the east, meeting the subway at Ossington subway station.

New light rail transit routes are planned for both Jane and Eglinton. The area will also be within reach of the Mount Dennis and Smart Track subway line at Weston and Eglinton. The subway line will connect to Line 5 Eglinton at Mount Dennis where there will be transportation along Eglinton to Pearson International Airport and south to Union Station.

== See also ==
- List of neighbourhoods in Toronto
