= Communist Party of Canada candidates in the 2015 Canadian federal election =

This is a list of Communist Party of Canada 2015 federal election candidates by riding and province.

== Alberta ==
Riding	Candidate's Name	Notes	Gender	Votes	%	Rank
Calgary Forest Lawn	Jason Devine	Candidate in Calgary East in the 2000, 2004, 2006, 2008, and 2011 elections	M	390	1.0	6/7
Edmonton Mill Woods	Naomi Rankin	Leader of the Communist Party of Alberta, perennial election candidate since 1982	F	96	0.2	8/8

== British Columbia ==
Riding	Candidate's Name	Notes	Gender	Votes	%	Rank
Burnaby North—Seymour	Brent Jantzen		M	126	0.2	7/8
Esquimalt—Saanich—Sooke	Tyson Strandlund		M	136	0.2	5/5
Surrey Centre	Iqbal Kahlon		M	133	0.3	6/6
Vancouver East	Peter Marcus		M	525	0.9	5/8
Vancouver Kingsway	Kimball Cariou	2011, 2008, and 2006 candidate in Vancouver East, candidate in Vancouver Centre in 2004 and 2000, Independent candidate in this riding in 1997	M	445	1.0	6/7

== Manitoba ==
Riding	Candidate's Name	Notes	Gender	Votes	%	Rank
Winnipeg Centre	Darrell Rankin	Former leader of the Communist Party of Ontario and current leader of the Communist Party of Manitoba, Perennial election candidate	M	135	0.4	6/6

== Newfoundland & Labrador ==
Riding	Candidate's Name	Notes	Gender	Votes	%	Rank
St. John's East	Sean Burton		M	140	0.3	5/5

== Nova Scotia ==
Riding	Candidate's Name	Notes	Gender	Votes	%	Rank
South Shore—St. Margarets	Ryan Barry		M	151	0.3	6/6

== Ontario ==
Riding	Candidate's Name	Notes	Gender	Votes	%	Rank
Brampton North	Harinderpal Hundal		M	120	0.2	5/5
Davenport	Miguel Figueroa	Leader of the Communist Party of Canada, perennial candidate	M	261	0.5	5/6
Don Valley West	Elizabeth Hill	City of York Board of Education Trustee from 1988 to 2006	F	84	0.2	6/7
Guelph	Tristan Dineen		M	144	0.2	7/7
Hamilton East—Stoney Creek	Bob Mann	2011, 2006 and 2004 candidate in this riding, 2000 and 1997 candidate in Hamilton East (1997 as an independent)	M	170	0.3	5/6
London West	Michael Lewis		M	87	0.1	6/6
Ottawa Centre	Stuart Ryan	2011, 2006 and 2004 candidate in this riding, 2000 candidate in Ottawa West—Nepean	M	124	0.2	8/8
Ottawa South	Larry Wasslen		M	136	0.2	7/7
St. Catharines	Saleh Waziruddin	2011 candidate in this riding	M	85	0.1	5/5
Sudbury	Elizabeth Rowley	2011 candidate in Brampton—Springdale, 2008 candidate in Windsor West, 2006 and 2004 candidate in Scarborough Southwest and 2000 candidate in Etobicoke North	F	102	0.2	6/7
Toronto Centre	Mariam Ahmad		F	133	0.3	6/7
University—Rosedale	Drew Garvie	2011, 2008 candidate in Guelph, organizer of the Young Communist League of Canada - Ontario	M	125	0.2	7/9

== Quebec ==
Riding	Candidate's Name	Notes	Gender	Votes	%	Rank
Hochelaga	Marianne Breton Fontaine	2011 candidate in this riding, leader of the Young Communist League of Canada (La ligue de la jeunesse communiste) Quebec	F	179	0.3	7/8
Laurier—Sainte-Marie	Pierre Fontaine		M	102	0.2	9/9
Outrement	Adrien Welsh	General Secretary of the Young Communist League of Canada	M	162	0.4	7/7
Ville-Marie—Le Sud-Ouest—Île-des-Soeurs	William Sloan	2011 candidate in Westmount—Ville-Marie	M	102	0.2	7/7
