= YMCI =

YMCI may refer to:

- York Mills Collegiate Institute, a high school in Toronto, Canada
- Young Men's Christian Institute, a forerunner of the University of Westminster, London, England
- York Memorial Collegiate Institute, a high school located in Toronto, Ontario
