= Mike Sullivan (Canadian politician) =

Canadian politician (born 1952)

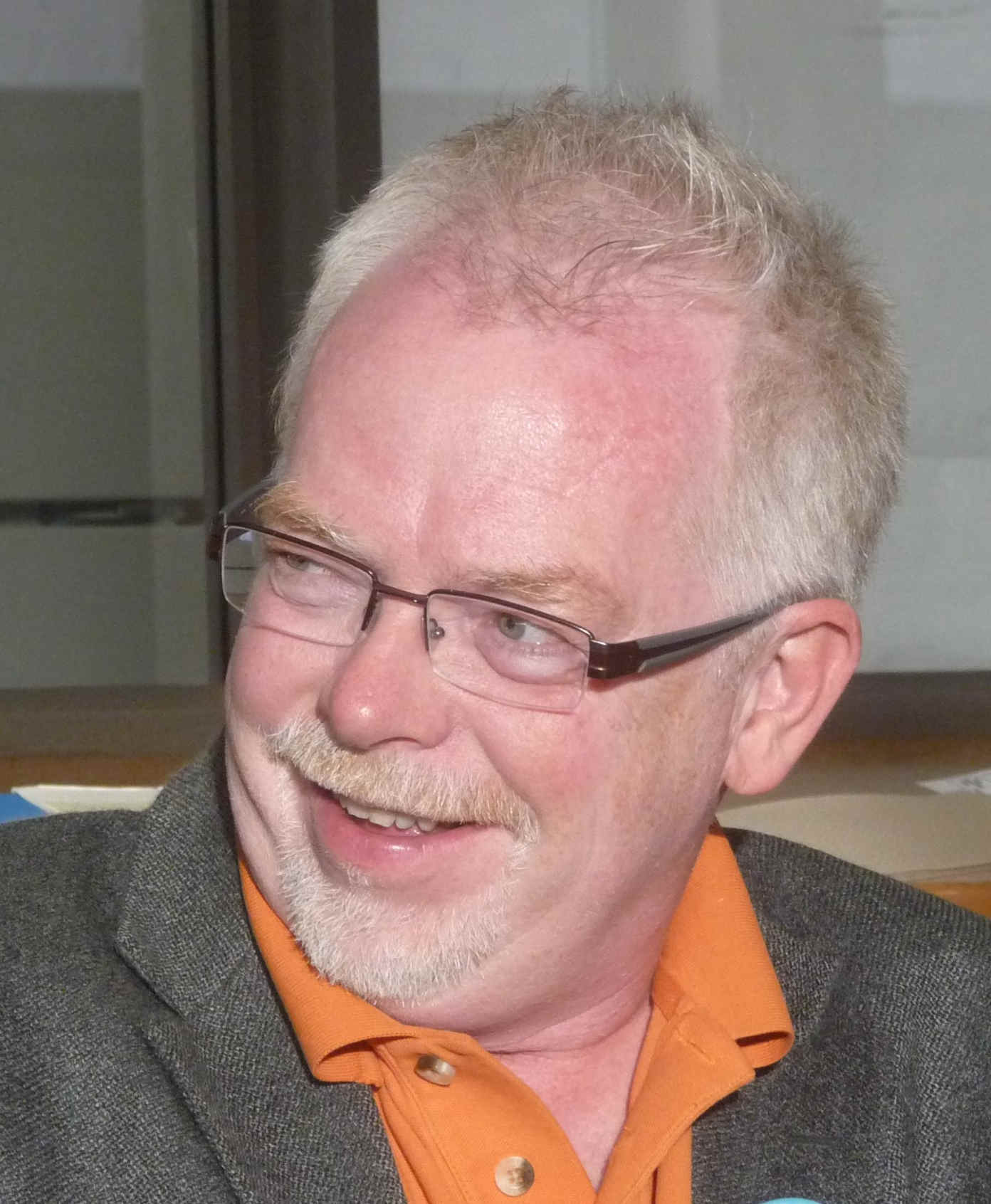

Member of Parliament for York South—Weston
- In office May 2, 2011 – August 4, 2015
- Preceded by: Alan Tonks
- Succeeded by: Ahmed Hussen

Personal details
- Born: Michael D. Sullivan; November 9, 1952 (age 73) Detroit, Michigan, United States
- Party: New Democrat
- Education: University of Toronto
- Occupation: Union representative

Michael D. Sullivan (born November 9, 1952) is a former Canadian politician. He was a New Democratic member of the House of Commons of Canada from 2011 to 2015 who was elected to represent the Toronto riding of York South—Weston.

== Background ==
Born in Detroit, Michigan, Sullivan grew up in Windsor, Ontario. He graduated from the University of Toronto with a Bachelor of Science degree in 1973. From February 1974 to November 1984, he worked for Canadian Broadcasting Corporation (CBC) where he was radio master control operator. From 1984 until his election to the House of Commons in 2011, Sullivan was a national representative for the National Association of Broadcast Employees and Technicians (NABET) and later the Communications Energy and Paperworkers (CEP), where he worked with CBC as well as Sun Media and Torstar newspapers.

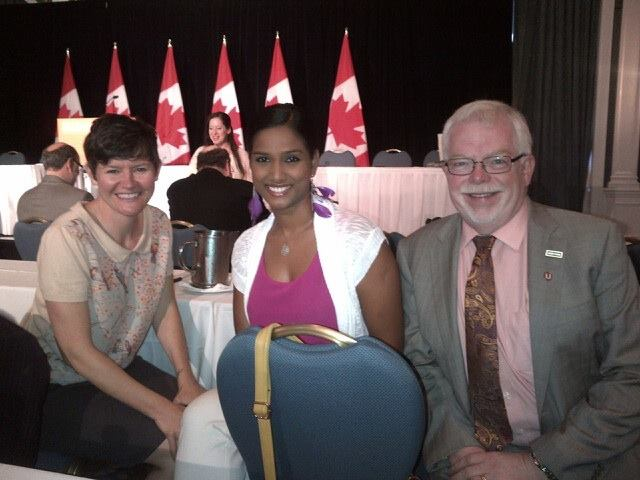
Left to right: Megan Leslie, Rathika Sitsabaiesan and Mike Sullivan at the New Democratic Party Caucus strategy session in Saskatoon

== Politics ==
Sullivan first ran for the NDP in York South—Weston in the 2008 federal election. He lost to Liberal incumbent Alan Tonks by 6,430 votes. He ran again in 2011, this time defeating Tonks by 2,580 votes.

He served as the NDP's Deputy Critic for Housing and Disability Issues in the 41st Canadian Parliament. In the 2015 election, Sullivan lost his seat to Liberal candidate Ahmed Hussen by 7,622 votes.

After losing his seat, he endorsed Charlie Angus in the 2017 New Democratic Party leadership election.

== Electoral record ==
2015 Canadian federal election: York South—Weston
Party	Candidate	Votes	%	±%	Expenditures
Liberal	Ahmed Hussen	20,093	46.0	+13.2	–
New Democratic	Mike Sullivan	13,281	30.4	-9.7	–
Conservative	James Robinson	8,399	19.2	-5.1	–
Libertarian	Stephen Lepone	1,041	2.4	–	–
Green	John Johnson	892	2.0	-0.8	–
Total valid votes/expense limit		43,706	100.0		$203,157.28
Total rejected ballots		362	0.82	+0.02	
Turnout		44,068	62.63	+9.53	
Eligible voters		70,361			
Liberal gain from New Democratic		Swing		+11.45	
Source: Elections Canada

2011 Canadian federal election
Party	Candidate	Votes	%	±%	Expenditures
New Democratic	Mike Sullivan	14,122	40.1	+12.1	–
Liberal	Alan Tonks	11,542	32.8	-13.8	–
Conservative	Jilian Saweczko	8,559	24.3	+3.9	–
Green	Sonny Day	975	2.8	-2.3	–
Total valid votes/expense limit		35,198	100.0		
Total rejected ballots		288	0.8	+0.1	
Turnout		35,486	53.10	+2.4	
Eligible voters		66,807	–	–	
New Democratic gain from Liberal		Swing		+12.95	

2008 Canadian federal election
Party	Candidate	Votes	%	±%	Expenditures
Liberal	Alan Tonks	16,071	46.6	-10.5	$48,748
New Democratic	Mike Sullivan	9,641	28.0	+6.7	$46,118
Conservative	Aydin Cocelli	7,021	20.4	+3.0	$27,300
Green	Andre Papadimitriou	1,757	5.1	+1.3	$2,977
Total valid votes/expense limit		34,490	100.0	$80,783	
Total rejected ballots		241	0.7		
Turnout		34,731	50.7		
Liberal hold		Swing		-8.6	
