= John Oostrom =

Canadian politician (1930–2023)

John Martin Oostrom

Member of Parliament for Willowdale
- In office September 4, 1984 – November 21, 1988
- Preceded by: Jim Peterson
- Succeeded by: Jim Peterson

Personal details
- Born: John Martin Oostrom; September 2, 1930 Werkhoven, Netherlands
- Died: March 4, 2023 (aged 92)
- Party: Progressive Conservative
- Profession: Businessman

John Martin Oostrom (September 2, 1930 – March 4, 2023) was a Canadian business executive and politician. He was the first Dutch-born Canadian elected to the House of Commons of Canada.

== Biography ==
Oostrom was the eldest of thirteen children and immigrated to Canada from the Netherlands with his entire family in 1952. They settled on a farm near Kemptville, Ontario. Oostrom moved to Toronto in 1955 to study at the University of Toronto, and graduated in 1959 with a BA. He subsequently earned a Master of Business Administration degree and entered the business world as a financial analyst. By the late 1970s, he had become an executive with the electronics firm, Philips Canada.

Oostrom was a member of Paul Hellyer's short-lived Action Canada Party in 1971, and followed Hellyer into the Progressive Conservative Party of Canada when Action Canada dissolved prior to the 1972 federal election. In that election, Oostrom was the Progressive Conservative (PC) candidate in the working-class Toronto riding of York South. He placed third behind New Democratic Party leader David Lewis and the Liberal candidate.

=== Career ===
In the 1979 federal election, Oostrom ran again in what had become York South—Weston. This time he came in second, only 3,500 votes behind Liberal incumbent Ursula Appolloni. A third attempt by Oostrom in the 1980 election was less successful. He came third with only half as many votes as the Liberal victor.

Oostrom was successful in his fourth campaign, in the 1984 federal election when he moved to the more affluent riding of Willowdale in North York. This time, Oostrom won, edging Liberal Member of Parliament Jim Peterson by just over 400 votes.

As a Progressive Conservative backbencher in the House of Commons of Canada, Oostrom was a social conservative, opposing abortion and favouring capital punishment and a hard law and order stance. As vice chair of the House of Common's committee responsible for immigration, Oostrom also expressed criticism of what he saw as lax policies towards refugee claimants. Oostrom was also a fervent anti-Communist and was also involved with the far-right World Anti-Communist League.

In the 1988 federal election, Oostrom again faced Peterson, who beat him by fewer than 2,000 votes. Oostrom returned to the private sector as a consultant before trying to regain his Willowdale seat as a PC Party candidate in the 1993 federal election. He was unsuccessful, garnering only 7,733 votes against Peterson's 28,000 and winning only 700 votes more than the third place Reform Party candidate.

Oostrom attempted another comeback in the 2000 federal election, this time in the suburban 905 riding of Oak Ridges north of Toronto. Running again as a Progressive Conservative, he came in a poor third.

In 2003, Oostrom added his voice to those Tories opposing the Progressive Conservative Party's merger with the Canadian Alliance.

=== Death ===
Oostrom died on March 4, 2023, at the age of 92.
