= Ursula Appolloni =

Canadian politician

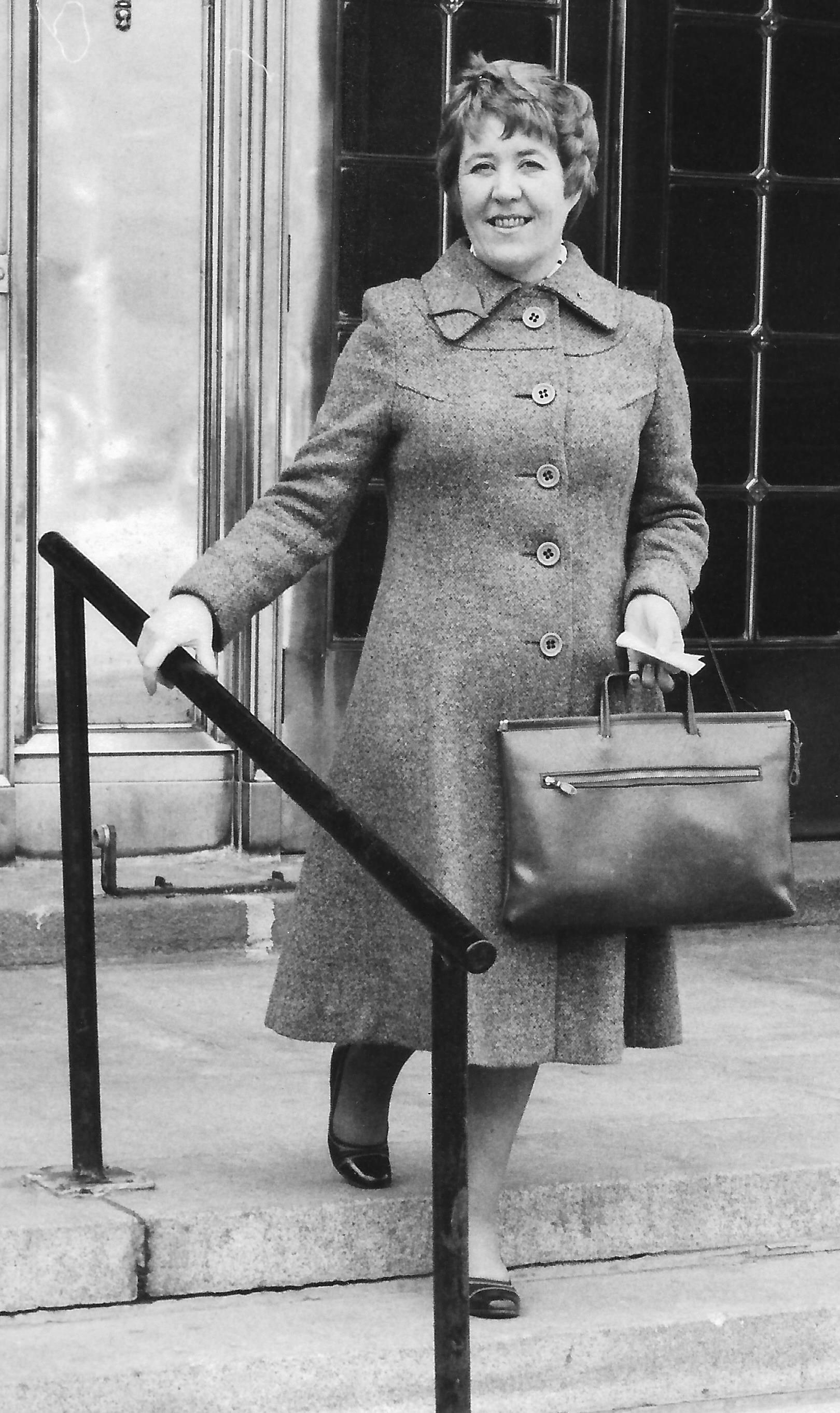
- Ursula Appolloni in front of her office, Confederation Building, Parliament Hill, Ottawa, in 1974

Member of Parliament for York South—Weston
- In office 22 May 1979 – 3 September 1984
- Preceded by: Riding established
- Succeeded by: John Nunziata

Member of Parliament for York South
- In office 8 July 1974 – 21 May 1979
- Preceded by: David Lewis
- Succeeded by: Riding dissolved

Personal details
- Born: Ursula Carroll; 7 December 1929 Cavan, Ireland
- Died: 28 December 1994 (aged 65) Ottawa, Ontario, Canada
- Party: Liberal
- Spouse: Lucio Appolloni (m. 1958)
- Children: 4
- Profession: Writer

Military service
- Allegiance: United Kingdom
- Branch/service: Women's Royal Air Force
- Years of service: 1948-1950
- Rank: Corporal

Ursula Appolloni (née Carroll; 7 December 1929 – 28 December 1994) was a Canadian politician. She served in the House of Commons as a Liberal Member of Parliament for the Toronto ridings of York South and York South—Weston from 1974 to 1984.

== Background ==
Appolloni was born in Cavan, Ireland as Ursula Carroll, and she served in Britain's Women's Royal Air Force from 1948 to 1950. In 1954 she met her future husband, Lucio, who at the time was working at the Italian consulate in Liverpool, England. They married in 1958 in Italy where they resided until 1965. She became fluent in Italian. They had four children together, Luisa, Suzanne, Andrew, and Simon. Eventually they emigrated to Canada and settled in Toronto. Prior to entering politics, she was a freelance writer with numerous articles published in the Toronto Telegram, Toronto Star and Catholic Register and she worked as chairman of the Board of Referees, Employment and Immigration Canada. Appolloni also directed a children's mime opera. After her election in 1974 they moved to Ottawa where they remained until her death.

== Politics ==
Appolloni was first involved in politics when she served as office manager for the campaign of Charles Caccia in the 1968 election. In 1974 she ran as the Liberal Party candidate in the riding of York South against New Democratic Party leader David Lewis in the federal election. Appolloni upset Lewis by 1,863 votes ending Lewis' political career. At his defeat, Lewis joked "One of the basic democratic rights is the right for the people to be wrong." Her husband, Lucio, had been the Liberal candidate in York South in the 1972 election. He lost to Lewis by almost 5,000 votes.

She remained as MP for York South and its successor riding, York South—Weston, until she retired in 1984. She was a backbencher for most of her parliamentary career, except for serving as Parliamentary Secretary to the Minister of National Defence from 1980 to 1982. Issues that she supported during her tenure included the creation of pensions for housewives and putting unemployed youth in the military reserve. She supported the abolition of the death penalty and was an anti-abortionist. Some argued that it was her anti-abortion stance that kept her out of cabinet.

== Later life ==
After leaving politics she worked as an editor for Health and Welfare Canada. A long-time smoker, she was diagnosed with lung cancer in June 1994 and died seven months later. Fellow Liberal Charles Caccia described her as "a person with a very big social conscience, with a particular interest in pensioners, women's rights and social justice."

== Electoral record ==
=== York South ===
1974 Canadian federal election
Party	Candidate	Votes
Liberal	Ursula Appolloni	12,485
New Democratic Party	David Lewis	10,622
Progressive Conservative	Paul J. Schrieder	5,557
Independent	Richard Sanders	103
Marxist–Leninist	Keith Corkill	102
Independent	Robert Douglas Sproule	97

=== York South-Weston ===
1979 Canadian federal election
Party	Candidate	Votes	%
Liberal	Ursula Appolloni	14,913	40.2
Progressive Conservative	John Oostrom	11,236	30.3
New Democratic	Vito Cautillo	10,451	28.2
Libertarian	Maria Sproule	336	0.9
Marxist–Leninist	Tim Sullivan	117	0.3
Total valid votes		37,053	100.0

1980 Canadian federal election
Party	Candidate	Votes	%	±%
Liberal	Ursula Appolloni	16,520	47.2	+7.0
New Democratic	Vince Del Buono	9,280	26.5	-1.7
Progressive Conservative	John Oostrom	8,711	24.9	-5.4
Libertarian	George Dance	299	0.9	-0.1
Communist	Mike Phillips	99	0.3	
Marxist–Leninist	Barbara Nunn	82	0.2	-0.1
Total valid votes		34,991	100.0	
