= York Humber High School =

Location
- 100 Emmett Avenue; Toronto, Ontario, M6M 2E6; Canada; 43°41′19.3632″N 79°30′14.7024″W

Information
- School type: Public, High school Vocational High school
- Motto: Factum Prosperitas (Build the Future)
- Religious affiliation: Secular
- Founded: 1967
- Status: Active (Emmett Rd.); Leased out (Humber Blvd.)
- School board: Toronto District School Board
- School district: South-West
- Superintendent: Sandy Spyropoulos; Executive Superintendent, LC1; Vicky Branco; LN03
- Area trustee: Chris Tonks; Ward 6
- School number: 6594 / 954640
- Principal: Rhonda Davy
- Grades: 9-12
- Enrolment: 160 (2019-20)
- Language: English
- Area: York
- Colours: Purple and Gold
- Team name: York Humber Bears
- Website: www.yorkhumber.ca

York Humber High School (also called York Humber HS, YMHS, or York Humber) is a specialized vocational basic high school located in Toronto, Ontario, Canada. It is administered by the Toronto District School Board. Prior to 1998, it was part of the Board of Education for the City of York. Founded in 1967 on Humber Blvd, the school moved to its new building on Emmett Road in 1992. Its motto is Factum Prosperitas (Build the Future).

== History ==
York Humber High School was constructed in 1966 and opened on September 5, 1967 on the original Humber Blvd. building. It was designed in brutalist architecture. In 1978, adult programs were introduced. By September 1988, the school had 489 students.

In 1989, the school was relocated to Frank Oke Secondary School and a warehouse building on Alliance Avenue and Cliff Street as two temporary locations and the new replacement school was built on Emmett Road in 1992 designed by Nowski Partners Architects. The former location was reopened by the Metropolitan Separate School Board as Archbishop Romero Catholic Secondary School that same year.

The school celebrated its 50th anniversary in 2017.

== Programs ==
York Humber offers its students several Experiential Learning programs including Green Industries, Food Services, Cosmetology, Auto Shop, and Carpentry. It has a Cooperative Education department where students develop many experiences and skills towards graduation and many other courses designed to increase employability, literacy and numeracy skills.

== See also ==
- Education in Ontario
- List of secondary schools in Ontario
- St. Oscar Romero Catholic Secondary School (Toronto)
