= Alan Tonks =

Canadian politician (born 1943)

Member of Parliament for York South—Weston
- In office November 27, 2000 – May 2, 2011
- Preceded by: John Nunziata
- Succeeded by: Mike Sullivan

6th Metro Toronto Chairman
- In office 1987–1997
- Preceded by: Dennis Flynn
- Succeeded by: Mel Lastman

Mayor of York
- In office 1982–1987
- Preceded by: Gayle Christie
- Succeeded by: Fergy Brown

Personal details
- Born: April 2, 1943 (age 83) Toronto, Ontario, Canada
- Party: Liberal
- Spouse: Cecile Tonks
- Children: 3
- Profession: Teacher

Alan Tonks (born April 2, 1943) is a former Canadian politician. He was the Liberal MP for the federal riding of York South—Weston in Toronto from 2000 to 2011, and was the Metro Toronto Chairman from 1987 to 1997.

== Background ==
Tonks is the son of the late Christopher Alexander Tonks (1917-2006), who was a reeve (1957-1960), deputy reeve, Board of Control member and alderman in what was first the Township and then the Borough of York (1969-1988) in Metropolitan Toronto. After graduating from York Memorial Collegiate Institute Tonks' father ran Tonks Hardware and Electric at 452 Rogers Road founded by his grandfather. Alan Tonks attended York University, where he earned a master's degree in political economy, and the University of Toronto, where he received a master's degree in education. He spent time working for a Canadian aid agency in Jamaica before becoming a junior high teacher for the Scarborough Board of Education for several years.

Married to Cecile, Tonks has three adult children, Chris, Matthew, and Alison. His son Chris is a former trustee on the Toronto District School Board.

== Local/municipal politics ==
Tonks entered municipal politics in 1978 and served as a member of the Board of Control in York from 1978 to 1980. He lost his first bid for they mayoralty in 1980 before serving as mayor from 1982 to 1988.

Due to a change in the Act governing Metropolitan Toronto, the position of Metro Chairman, beginning in 1988, had to be elected from Metro Councillors who were themselves elected to represent specific wards. Mayors continued to sit on Metro Council on an ex-officio basis but were now ineligible to be candidates for Metro Chairman as were former or non-members of Metro Council. Accordingly, incumbent Metro Chairman Dennis Flynn, a former mayor of Etobicoke, had to run for Metro Councillor in a specific ward if he wanted to remain Metro Chairman. Similarly, Tonks, who wished to become Metro Chairman, could not run for that position while being Mayor of York. Accordingly, in the 1988 municipal election, he did not run for re-election as Mayor of York and instead ran for the position of Metro Councillor representing one of York's two Metro wards.

At the first Metro Council session following the municipal election, Tonks was elected Chairman of the Municipality of Metropolitan Toronto by the other members of Metro Toronto Council defeating incumbent Metro Chairman Dennis Flynn, the only time a sitting Metro Chairman would be defeated by a challenger.

Tonks led Toronto until 1997. He did not run in the 1997 election and retired from local politics. In 1999, he was appointed chair of the Greater Toronto Services Board and served until 2000 when he became a federal member of parliament.

== Provincial politics ==
He first ran for the Legislative Assembly of Ontario in the 1975 provincial election as a candidate of the Ontario Liberal Party, and finished third in York South against former New Democratic Party leader Donald C. MacDonald. He was also unsuccessful in the 1987 Ontario election, losing to NDP leader Bob Rae by only 333 votes in York South.

== Federal politics ==
He was elected to the House of Commons of Canada in the 2000 election as the Liberal MP for York South—Weston defeating Independent MP (and former Liberal) John Nunziata by 1,497 votes. In 2003 he served as a parliamentary secretary to the Minister for the Environment. He was re-elected by a much greater margin in the federal elections held in 2004. He served as a member of the official opposition from 2006 to 2011, when he lost his seat by around 2500 votes to the NDP's Mike Sullivan.
