= Board of Education for the City of York =

Defunct school district in Ontario, Canada

Location
- 2 Trethewey Drive; Toronto, Ontario, Canada; M6M 4A8 Canada
- District ID: YBE

The Board of Education for the City of York (YBE), also known as the York Board of Education, is the former school district serving the Toronto suburb of York, Ontario. In 1998, it became part of the Toronto District School Board and the headquarters of the school board continues to be used as the TDSB's Continuing Education Office.

== Schools ==
As the district merged into the TDSB, its schools were:

=== Elementary and middle ===
- Bala Community School
- Charles E. Webster Public School
- Cedarvale Community School
- Cordella Junior Public School
- Dennis Avenue Community School
- F.H. Miller Junior Public School
- Fairbank Public School
- Fairbank Memorial Public School
- General Mercer Junior Public School
- George Syme Community School
- Harwood Public School
- Humbercrest Public School
- Humewood Community School
- J.R. Wilcox Community School
- Kane Middle School - merged within Silverthorn before 2011
- King George Junior Public School
- Lambton Park Community School
- Rawlinson Community School
- Roselands Junior Public School
- Silverthorn Community School - moved to old site of Kane Middle School 2011 and old site on Ypres Road re-developed
- Warren Park Junior Public School

=== Secondary ===
Secondary schools:

- George Harvey Collegiate Institute (1953)
- Frank Oke Vocational School
- Runnymede Collegiate Institute (1927)
- Vaughan Road Academy (1927; closed in 2017)
- Weston Collegiate Institute (1857)
- York Humber High School (1967)
- York Memorial Collegiate Institute (1929)
- Adult Day School (Moved to Yorkdale site; former D.B. Hood Community School and now Lycée Français de Toronto)
