= York South—Weston—Etobicoke =

Federal electoral district in Ontario, Canada

Coordinates: 43.697°N 79.503°W

Ontario electoral district
- Interactive map of riding boundaries from the 2025 federal election

Federal electoral district
- Legislature: House of Commons
MP
Ahmed Hussen
Liberal
- District created: 1976
- First contested: 1979
- Last contested: 2025
- District webpage: profile, map

Demographics
- Population (2021): 116,757
- Electors (2021): 76,304
- Area (km²): 24.80
- Pop. density (per km²): 4,707.9
- Census division: Toronto
- Census subdivision: Toronto (part)

York South—Weston—Etobicoke (French: York-Sud—Weston—Etobicoke; formerly York South—Weston) is a federal electoral district in Ontario, Canada, that has been represented in the House of Commons of Canada since 1979.

In 2015, York South—Weston elected Canada's first MP of Somali descent, Ahmed Hussen.

Under the 2022 Canadian federal electoral redistribution the riding was renamed York South—Weston—Etobicoke.

== Electoral district ==
Located in the west-end of Toronto, the riding is made up largely of the old City of York, a southwestern portion of the old city of North York, and parts of the old city of Toronto north of High Park. A sizeable portion of the land in the western part of the riding which was previously part of the old City of York was the old village of Weston until that village was absorbed into the City of York in 1968. The riding has a largely working class and immigrant population.

Its geographic boundaries are the part of the City of Toronto bounded by a line drawn from Humber River east along Highway 401, south along the Canadian National Railway situated west of Caledonia Road, west along Rogers Road, southeast along Old Weston Road, west along Lavender Road, south along Keele Street, southeast along the Canadian National/Canadian Pacific Railway, west along the Canadian Pacific Railway, and north along the Humber River to Highway 401.

=== Former boundaries ===
York South—Weston was created in 1976 from parts of York South, York West, Davenport, High Park—Humber Valley, and Etobicoke ridings.

Its new boundaries were originally of the part of Metropolitan Toronto bounded by a line drawn from Eglinton Avenue West north along Keele Street, west along Lawrence Avenue West, south along the Humber River, east and north along the north limit of the City of Toronto, south along Runnymede Road, east along Annette Street, south along Keele Street, east along Humberside Avenue, northwest along the Canadian National Railway, east along the north limit of the City of Toronto, north along the east side of Prospect Cemetery, and west along Eglinton Avenue West to Keele Street.

In 1987, York South—Weston was redefined to consist of the parts of the cities of North York, Toronto and York bounded by a line drawn from the western limit of the City of North York east along Highway 401, south along Keele Street, west along Eglinton Avenue West, south along Keele Street, west along the southern limit of the City of York, southeast along the Canadian National Railway line, west along Dupont Street, northwest along Dundas Street West, west along Annette Street, north along Runnymede Road, west along the Canadian Pacific Railway line, and north along the western limits of the Cities of York and North York to Highway 401.

In 1996, it was redefined to consist of the parts of the cities of North York, Toronto and York bounded by a line drawn from the western limit of the City of North York east along Highway 401, southeast along the Canadian National Railway situated immediately west of Caledonia Road, west along Rogers Road, south along Old Weston Road, west along the northern limit of the City of Toronto, southeast along the Canadian National Railway, west along the Canadian Pacific Railway, and north along the western limit of the cities of York and North York to Highway 401.

In 2003, it was given its current boundaries as described above. This riding was unchanged during the 2012 electoral redistribution.

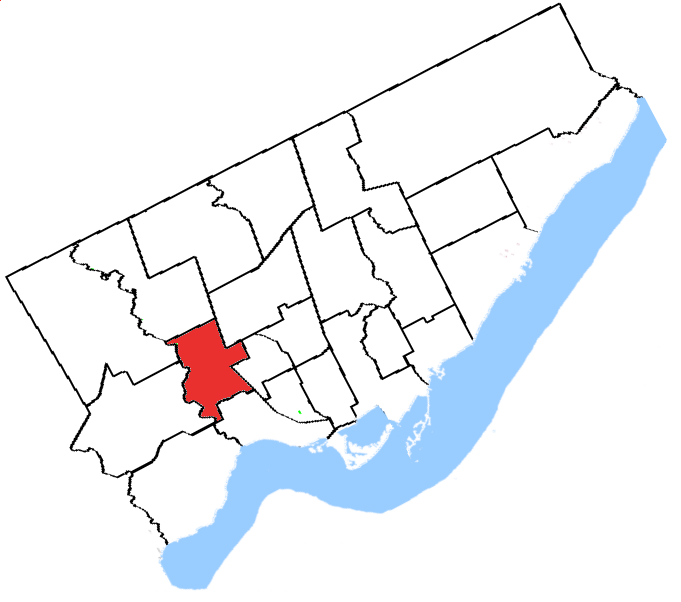
1976 to 1987

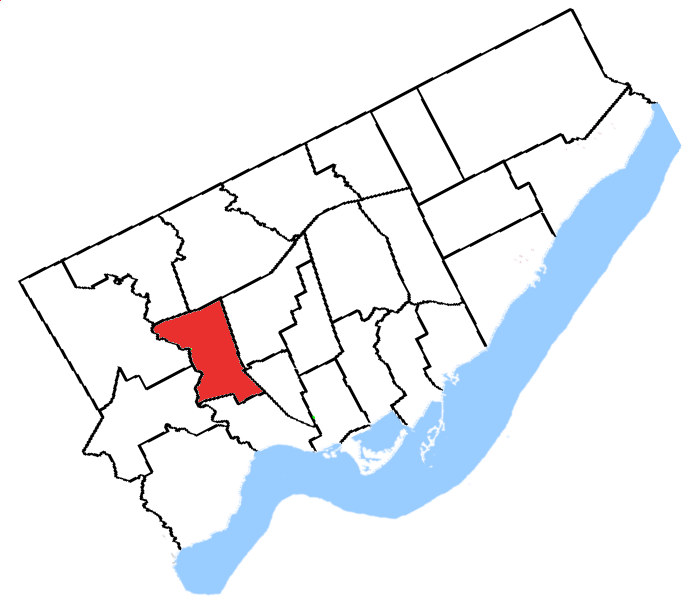
1987 to 1996

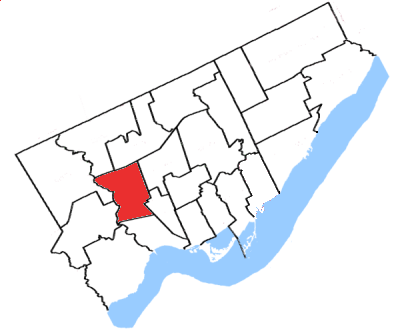
1996 to 2003

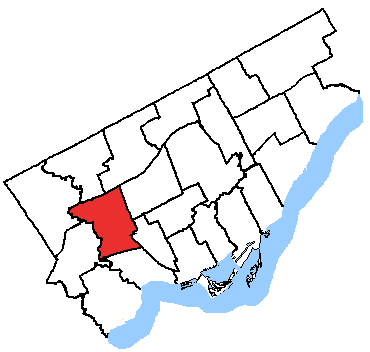
2003 to 2015

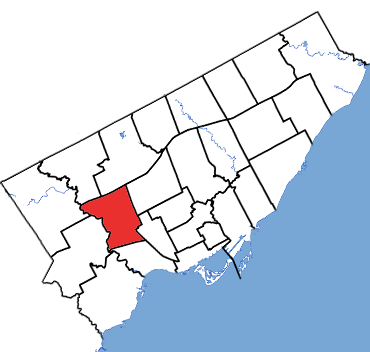
2015 to 2025

== Demographics ==
According to the 2021 Canadian census; 2013 representation

Languages: 49% English, 9.8% Portuguese, 7.2% Spanish, 4.8% Italian, 3.2% Tagalog, 3.1% Vietnamese, 2.1% Somali, 1% Yue
Religions: 65.9% Christian (41.2% Catholic, 2.8% Pentecostal, 2.3% Christian Orthodox, 1.7% Anglican, 1% Baptist), 18.5% No religion, 8.7% Muslim, 3% Buddhist, 2.6% Hindu
Median income (2020): $34,400
Average income (2020): $43,360

Ethnicity groups: White: 41.2%, Black: 24%, Latin American: 9.1%, Filipino: 6.8%, South Asian: 5.7%, Southeast Asian 4.6%, Chinese: 1.9%

Ethnic origins: Portuguese 12.2%, Italian 11%, Filipino: 6.2%, Canadian 6%, Jamaican 5.1%, English 4.4%, African 4.2%, Vietnamese 4.2%, Irish 4%, Scottish 3.6%

== Members of Parliament ==
This riding has elected the following members of the House of Commons of Canada:

Parliament	Years	Member	Party
York South—Weston; Riding created from York South, York West, Davenport, High Park—Humber Valley and Etobicoke
31st	1979–1980	Ursula Appolloni	Liberal
32nd	1980–1984	Ursula Appolloni	Liberal
33rd	1984–1988	John Nunziata	Liberal
34th	1988–1993	John Nunziata	Liberal
35th	1993–1996	John Nunziata	Liberal
35th	1996–1997	John Nunziata	Independent
36th	1997–2000	John Nunziata	Independent
37th	2000–2004	Alan Tonks	Liberal
38th	2004–2006	Alan Tonks	Liberal
39th	2006–2008	Alan Tonks	Liberal
40th	2008–2011	Alan Tonks	Liberal
41st	2011–2015	Mike Sullivan	New Democratic
42nd	2015–2019	Ahmed Hussen	Liberal
43rd	2019–2021	Ahmed Hussen	Liberal
44th	2021–2025	Ahmed Hussen	Liberal
York South—Weston—Etobicoke
45th	2025–present	Ahmed Hussen	Liberal

== Election results ==
Graph of election results in York South—Weston (parties that never received 2% of the vote are omitted) View source data.

2025 Canadian federal election
** Preliminary results — Not yet official **
Party	Candidate	Votes	%	±%	Expenditures
Liberal	Ahmed Hussen	24,540	55.24	–0.34	
Conservative	Nicolas Pham	17,562	39.53	+17.05	
New Democratic	Louise James	2,325	5.23	–9.36	
Total valid votes/expense limit					
Total rejected ballots					
Turnout		44,427	57.53		
Eligible voters		77,219			
Liberal notional hold		Swing		–8.70	
Source: Elections Canada

2021 federal election redistributed results
Party	Vote	%
Liberal	21,364	55.58
Conservative	8,640	22.48
New Democratic	5,800	15.09
People's	1,897	4.94
Green	734	1.91
Others	3	0.01

2021 Canadian federal election: York South—Weston
Party	Candidate	Votes	%	±%	Expenditures
Liberal	Ahmed Hussen	21,644	56.1	-2.3	$74,095.01
Conservative	Sajanth Mohan	7,783	20.2	+1.3	$20,850.17
New Democratic	Hawa Mire	6,517	16.9	-0.5	$57,283.18
People's	Sitara Chiu	1,754	4.5	+3.0	none listed
Green	Nicki Ward	872	2.3	-1.4	$1,360.28
Total valid votes/expense limit		38,570	99.0	–	$109,157.97
Total rejected ballots		404	1.0		
Turnout		38,974	51.1		
Eligible voters		76,304			
Liberal hold		Swing		-1.8	
Source: Elections Canada

2019 Canadian federal election: York South—Weston
Party	Candidate	Votes	%	±%	Expenditures
Liberal	Ahmed Hussen	25,976	58.42	+12.45	$96,745.62
Conservative	Jasveen Rattan	8,415	18.93	-0.29	none listed
New Democratic	Yafet Tewelde	7,754	17.44	-12.95	$55,295.42
Green	Nicki Ward	1,633	3.67	+1.63	$1,307.06
People's	Gerard Racine	685	1.54	-	$2,285.36
Total valid votes/expense limit		44,463	98.72		
Total rejected ballots		575	1.28	+0.46	
Turnout		45,038	56.75	-4.37	
Eligible voters		79,364			
Liberal hold		Swing		+6.37	
Source: Elections Canada

2015 Canadian federal election
Party	Candidate	Votes	%	±%	Expenditures
Liberal	Ahmed Hussen	20,093	45.97	+13.18	$82,886.06
New Democratic	Mike Sullivan	13,281	30.39	-9.73	$155,467.41
Conservative	James Robinson	8,399	19.22	-5.10	$16,183.98
Libertarian	Stephen Lepone	1,041	2.38	–	$202.00
Green	John Johnson	892	2.04	-0.73	$455.00
Total valid votes/expense limit		43,706	99.18		$203,875.44
Total rejected ballots		362	0.82	+0.01	
Turnout		44,068	61.12	+9.21	
Eligible voters		72,097			
Liberal gain from New Democratic		Swing		+11.46	
Source: Elections Canada

2011 Canadian federal election
Party	Candidate	Votes	%	±%	Expenditures
New Democratic	Mike Sullivan	14,122	40.1	+12.1	–
Liberal	Alan Tonks	11,542	32.8	-13.8	–
Conservative	Jilian Saweczko	8,559	24.3	+3.9	–
Green	Sonny Day	975	2.8	-2.3	–
Total valid votes/expense limit		35,198	100.0		
Total rejected ballots		288	0.8	+0.1	
Turnout		35,486	53.10	+2.4	
Eligible voters		66,807	–	–	
New Democratic gain from Liberal		Swing		+12.95	

2008 Canadian federal election
Party	Candidate	Votes	%	±%	Expenditures
Liberal	Alan Tonks	16,071	46.6	-10.5	$48,748
New Democratic	Mike Sullivan	9,641	28.0	+6.7	$46,118
Conservative	Aydin Cocelli	7,021	20.4	+3.0	$27,300
Green	Andre Papadimitriou	1,757	5.1	+1.3	$2,977
Total valid votes/expense limit		34,490	100.0	$80,783	
Total rejected ballots		241	0.7		
Turnout		34,731	50.7		
Liberal hold		Swing		-8.6	

2006 Canadian federal election: York South—Weston
Party	Candidate	Votes	%	±%	Expenditures
Liberal	Alan Tonks	22,871	57.06%	−2.77%	$36,134
New Democratic	Paul Ferreira	8,525	21.27%	+0.06%	$24,433
Conservative	Stephen Halicki	6,991	17.44%	+2.49%	$22,529
Green	Maria De Angelis-Pater	1,506	3.76%	+0.26%	$1,003
Independent	Dragan Cimesa	189	0.47%	–	–
Total valid votes		40,082	100.0%		

2004 Canadian federal election: York South—Weston
Party	Candidate	Votes	%	±%
Liberal	Alan Tonks	20,537	59.8	+14.2
New Democratic	Paul Ferreira	7,281	21.2	+17.5
Conservative	Stephen Halicki	5,133	14.9	+7.1
Green	Jessica Fracassi	1,199	3.5	+2.6
Communist	Shirley Hawley	175	0.5	+0.1
Total valid votes		34,325		
Note: Conservative vote is compared to the total of the Canadian Alliance vote and Progressive Conservative vote in 2000 election.

2000 Canadian federal election
Party	Candidate	Votes	%	±%
Liberal	Alan Tonks	15,841	45.6	+12.2
Independent	John Nunziata	14,344	41.3	-3.7
Alliance	Dan Houssar	1,754	5.0	-1.2
New Democratic	Tom Parkin	1,288	3.7	-5.6
Progressive Conservative	Jason Daniel Baker	986	2.8	-2.2
Green	Denis Calnan	293	0.8	+0.4
Communist	Hassan Husseini	130	0.4	+0.1
Marxist–Leninist	Anna Dicarlo	102	0.3	0.0
Total valid votes		34,738	100.0	

Note: Canadian Alliance vote is compared to the Reform vote in 1997 election.

1997 Canadian federal election
Party	Candidate	Votes	%	±%
Independent	John Nunziata	17,163	45.0	
Liberal	Judy Sgro	12,732	33.4	-36.7
New Democratic	Odoardo Di Santo	3,552	9.3	+3.9
Reform	Kathleen Crone	2,363	6.2	-8.6
Progressive Conservative	Jan Harnett	1,925	5.1	-1.8
Green	Shelley Lipsey	171	0.4	
Marxist–Leninist	Ginette Boutet	112	0.3	+0.1
Independent	Hassan Husseini	98	0.3	
Total valid votes		38,116	100.0	

1993 Canadian federal election
Party	Candidate	Votes	%	±%
Liberal	John Nunziata	23,919	70.1	+16.4
Reform	Kathleen Crone	5,047	14.8	
Progressive Conservative	Tony Figliano	2,332	6.8	-14.8
New Democratic	Sil Salvaterra	1,864	5.5	-17.7
Natural Law	Greg W. Roberts	265	0.8	
Libertarian	Roma Kelembet	261	0.8	0.0
Independent	Danny Red Goldstick	119	0.3	
Abolitionist	Philip Scott Carter	88	0.3	
Commonwealth of Canada	Felix Duda	80	0.2	0.0
Independent	Peter Hones	71	0.2	
Marxist–Leninist	Heather Robertson	68	0.2	
Total valid votes		34,114	100.0	

1988 Canadian federal election
Party	Candidate	Votes	%	±%
Liberal	John Nunziata	21,111	53.7	+16.0
New Democratic	Steve Krashinsky	9,095	23.1	-7.9
Progressive Conservative	Carlo Testa	8,488	21.6	-7.0
Libertarian	Clifford Trewin	295	0.8	0.0
Communist	Omar Latif	210	0.5	+0.1
Commonwealth of Canada	Myrtle Thompson	105	0.3	
Total valid votes		39,304	100.0	

1984 Canadian federal election
Party	Candidate	Votes	%	±%
Liberal	John Nunziata	14,217	37.7	-2.5
New Democratic	Steve Krashinsky	11,679	31.0	+2.8
Progressive Conservative	Carlo Testa	10,789	28.6	-1.7
Independent	Mike Luczkiw	526	1.4	
Libertarian	Myron Petriw	281	0.7	-0.2
Communist	Mike Phillips	174	0.5	
Total valid votes		37,666	100.0	

1980 Canadian federal election
Party	Candidate	Votes	%	±%
Liberal	Ursula Appolloni	16,520	47.2	+7.0
New Democratic	Vince Del Buono	9,280	26.5	-1.7
Progressive Conservative	John Oostrom	8,711	24.9	-5.4
Libertarian	George Dance	299	0.9	-0.1
Communist	Mike Phillips	99	0.3	
Marxist–Leninist	Barbara Nunn	82	0.2	-0.1
Total valid votes		34,991	100.0	

1979 Canadian federal election
Party	Candidate	Votes	%
Liberal	Ursula Appolloni	14,913	40.2
Progressive Conservative	John Oostrom	11,236	30.3
New Democratic	Vito Cautillo	10,451	28.2
Libertarian	Maria Sproule	336	0.9
Marxist–Leninist	Tim Sullivan	117	0.3
Total valid votes		37,053	100.0

== Toronto Council Wards 11 and 12 ==
Etobicoke North is also the name for two wards on Toronto City Council each represented by a city councillor:

- (Ward 11) York South - Weston - current councillor Frances Nunziata
- (Ward 12) York South - Weston - current councillor Frank Di Giorgio

The combined ward boundaries roughly corresponds to the federal electoral district.

== See also ==
- List of Canadian electoral districts
- Historical federal electoral districts of Canada
