= George Harvey Collegiate Institute =

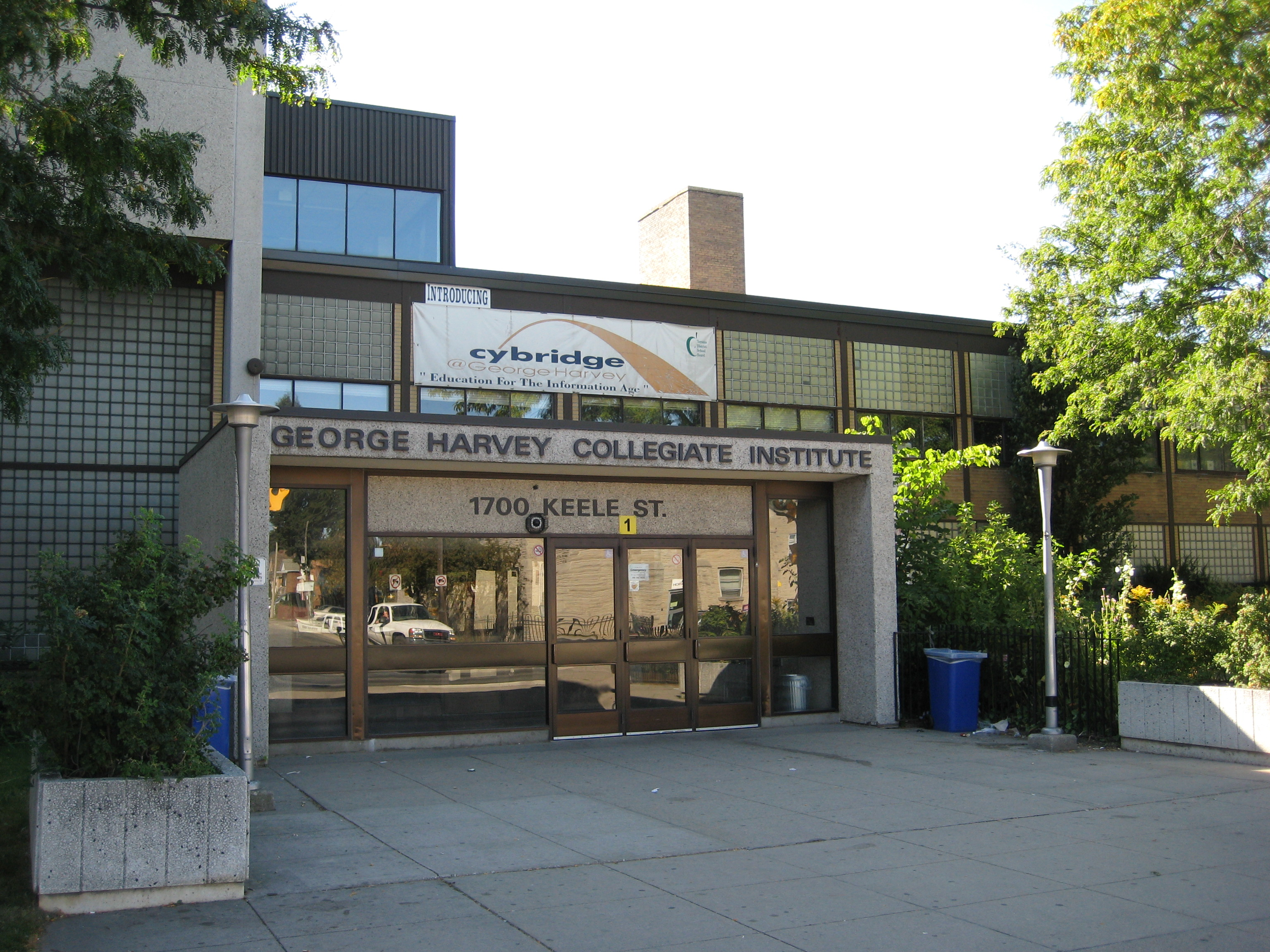
- George Harvey in 2009.

Location
- 1700 Keele Street; Toronto, Ontario, M6M 3W5; Canada; 43.684459°N 79.473327°W

Information
- Former names: George Harvey Vocational School; George Harvey Secondary School
- School type: Public High school
- Motto: Industry. Life. Commerce
- Founded: September 2, 1952; 73 years ago
- Closed: June 30, 2022; 4 years ago
- School board: Toronto District School Board (Board of Education for the City of York)
- Superintendent: Jeff Hainbuch
- Area trustee: Chris Tonks
- Principal: S. Miceli
- Faculty: Z. Prekajski, G. Vanek
- Grades: 9 to 12
- Enrolment: 600 (2020-2021)
- Language: English
- Schedule type: Semestered
- Area: York
- Team name: Hawks
- Website: www.georgeharveyci.ca

George Harvey Collegiate Institute (George Harvey CI, GHCI, also known simply as Harvey) is a Toronto District School Board facility that previously operated as a high school in Toronto, Ontario, Canada. It was formerly known as George Harvey Vocational School and George Harvey Secondary School located in the former suburb of York. Before 1998, it was part of the Board of Education for the City of York.

The school opened in 1952 as the first vocational school in the former City of York for students who wanted to pursue skilled trades. It became a composite secondary school focused on technology and offered a STEPS to University program, as well as a program called Game Design. George Harvey was also the first TDSB school to provide netbooks to students. The school ceased to exist as an individual school on June 30, 2022, when the student body consolidated with York Memorial Collegiate Institute, in the same building, which will operate until 2026.

== History ==
The vocational school was constructed in 1951 and opened in 1952. Designed by architect John B. Parkin, the original building had 12 classrooms, 3 commercial rooms, 3 typing rooms, two science labs, a double gymnasium, a 500-seat auditorium, a library, an auto shop, an electrical shop, a machine shop, a wood shop and a large trades room. It was the first technical secondary school serving the former City of York before it evolved into a composite school.

In May 2019, the school hosted 900 students from the displaced nearby York Memorial Collegiate Institute, which had been damaged in a five-alarm fire. As the school had a population of 535 students, the building can hold up to 1,435 pupils.

After the pupil accommodation review in 2021, the school and its name ceased to exist by June 30, 2022, and its student body was consolidated and has operated as York Memorial Collegiate Institute since September 2022. The newly-merged school will continue to operate at the George Harvey building until 2026.

== Notable alumni ==
- Tyrone Williams, former NFL and CFL player

== See also ==
- Education in Ontario
- List of secondary schools in Ontario
