= York Memorial Collegiate Institute =

High school in Toronto, Ontario, Canada

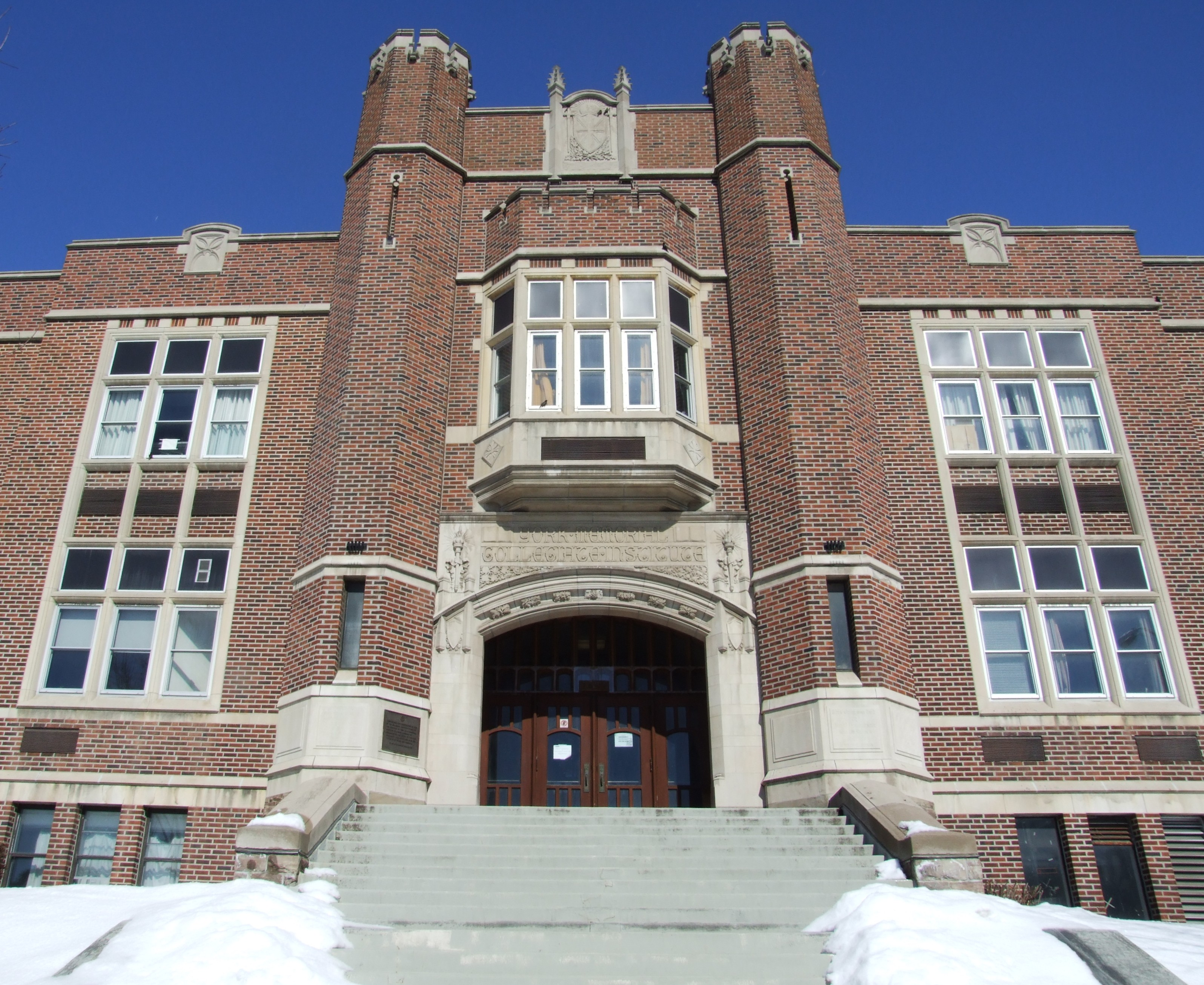
- Permanent building, damaged by fire in May 2019

Location
- 1700 Keele Street; Toronto, Ontario, M6M 3W5; Canada; 43°41′25″N 79°28′35″W

Information
- School type: Public, high school
- Motto: Macte Nova Virtute (Go Forth With New Strength)
- Religious affiliation: Non-aligned
- Established: 1929
- Status: Active, school temporarily relocated to 1700 Keele St
- School board: Toronto District School Board (Board of Education for the City of York)
- School district: North-West
- Superintendent: Uton Robinson; Executive Superintendent, LC1; Kwame Lennon; LN03
- Area trustee: Chris Tonks, Ward 6
- School number: 6697 / 954683
- Principal: Donald Drummond
- Grades: 9–12
- Enrolment: 1450 (2022–2023)
- Language: English
- Area: York, Toronto, Ontario
- Colours: Red and gold
- Mascot: Mustangs
- Team name: York Memorial Mustangs
- Website: schools.tdsb.on.ca/yorkmemorial/

York Memorial Collegiate Institute is a public secondary school in Toronto, Ontario, Canada. It is administered by Toronto District School Board (TDSB), de jure located at 2690 Eglinton Avenue West. Prior to 1998, the school was part of the legacy Board of Education for the City of York.

The school opened in 1929 at the Keele and Eglinton area in what was then the Township of York. At 1,350 students, the school is often referred to as "Memo" by its students. Its motto is Macte Nova Virtute (Go forth with new strength).

== History ==
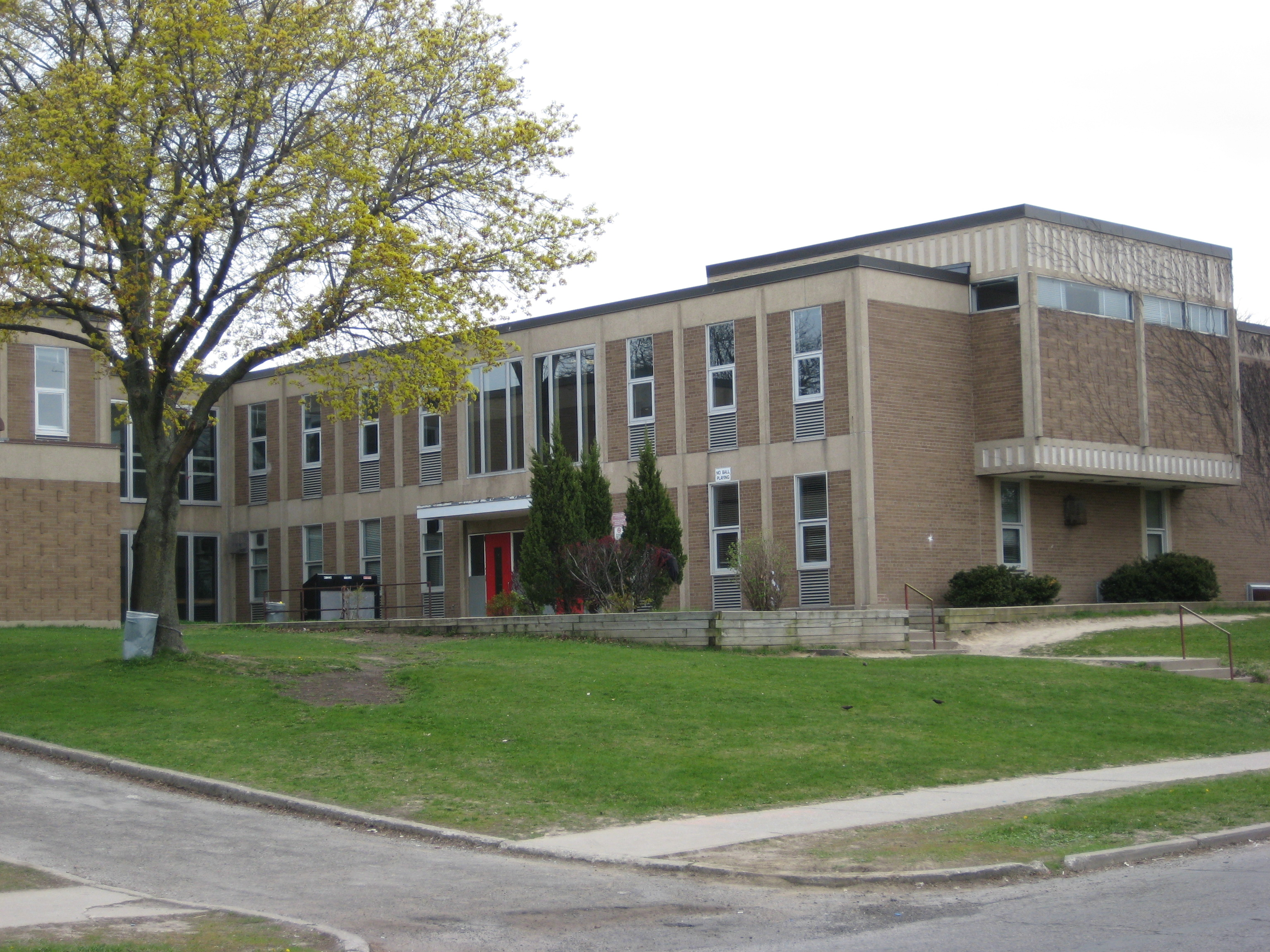
From 2019 to 2022, York Memorial Collegiate was housed at the former Scarlett Heights Entrepreneurial Academy building.

In 1929, the Council of the Township of York decided to construct a high school in memory of their youth killed in World War I and purchased 9.5 acres (3.8 ha). Architect Charles Wellington Smith designed the building and the cornerstone was laid on May 6. The school was opened on September 3, 1929, to its first students. The Collegiate Gothic building with Don Valley Brick and smooth faded stone, consists of 15 classrooms, 3 science labs, an auditorium, cafeteria, two gyms, a swimming pool, and various offices. It was built at a cost of $250 000. The school officially opened on January 30, 1930.

A World War II memorial was dedicated on February 27, 1949.

Since the building was originally constructed in 1929, in 1954, an addition with six classrooms was added. This is followed by the construction of seven classrooms and library in 1961, followed by fourteen classrooms and pool area conversion in 1966. The next year, in 1967, a new swimming pool was built in the site of the Centennial building, with a gym and community centre. Eight rooms were converted between 1968 and 1969. The last addition, in the eastern portion, was built in 1971, currently houses the cafeteria, library, and the offices of the York school board (which are currently used by the TDSB as its continuing education offices).

By 1973, fire escapes were added, space in the interior was converted for lockers. Some rooms were also converted in 1988.

In 1985, the building was designated as a heritage building by the York City Council.

On May 6 and 7, 2019, fires started in the YMCI building, which reached six-alarm status. The second fire caused sections of the roof and walls to collapse, as well as damage or destruction to the stained glass windows in the auditorium. All of the students were temporarily housed in nearby George Harvey Collegiate Institute.

The school is being rebuilt using materials including brick and a stained glass window salvaged from the remnants of the current building. TDSB is projecting the completion in 2026.

In December 2022, 14 teachers refused to work citing unsafe working conditions. Students subsequently staged a walkout due to the teacher shortage and safety concerns.

== Advanced Placement ==
York Memorial has Roadmap to University with Success with Honours (RUSH) and Advanced Placement (AP) programs. The RUSH program is an enrichment program that trains students for the full AP program. AP courses are offered in a wide variety of subjects.

There is also a Pre-Advanced Placement program (10 English, 11 Biology, 11 Physics, 11 Chemistry) which students attend in grades 10 to 11 before taking the AP program in grade 12.

== Notable alumni ==
- Samantha Bee – Comedian, The Daily Show correspondent
- Dave Devall – Retired weatherman
- D-Sisive – rapper
- Harry Sinden – Former Boston Bruins' president
- Gail Kim – WWE Wrestler/diva and TNA Knockout
- Alan Tonks – Canadian former Liberal MP
- Ross Dowson - Trotskyist leader and political activist
- Chuck Crate - leader of the Canadian Union of Fascists

== See also ==
- Education in Ontario
- List of secondary schools in Ontario
