= Old Toronto =

- Dissolved (core) city (lower-tier)
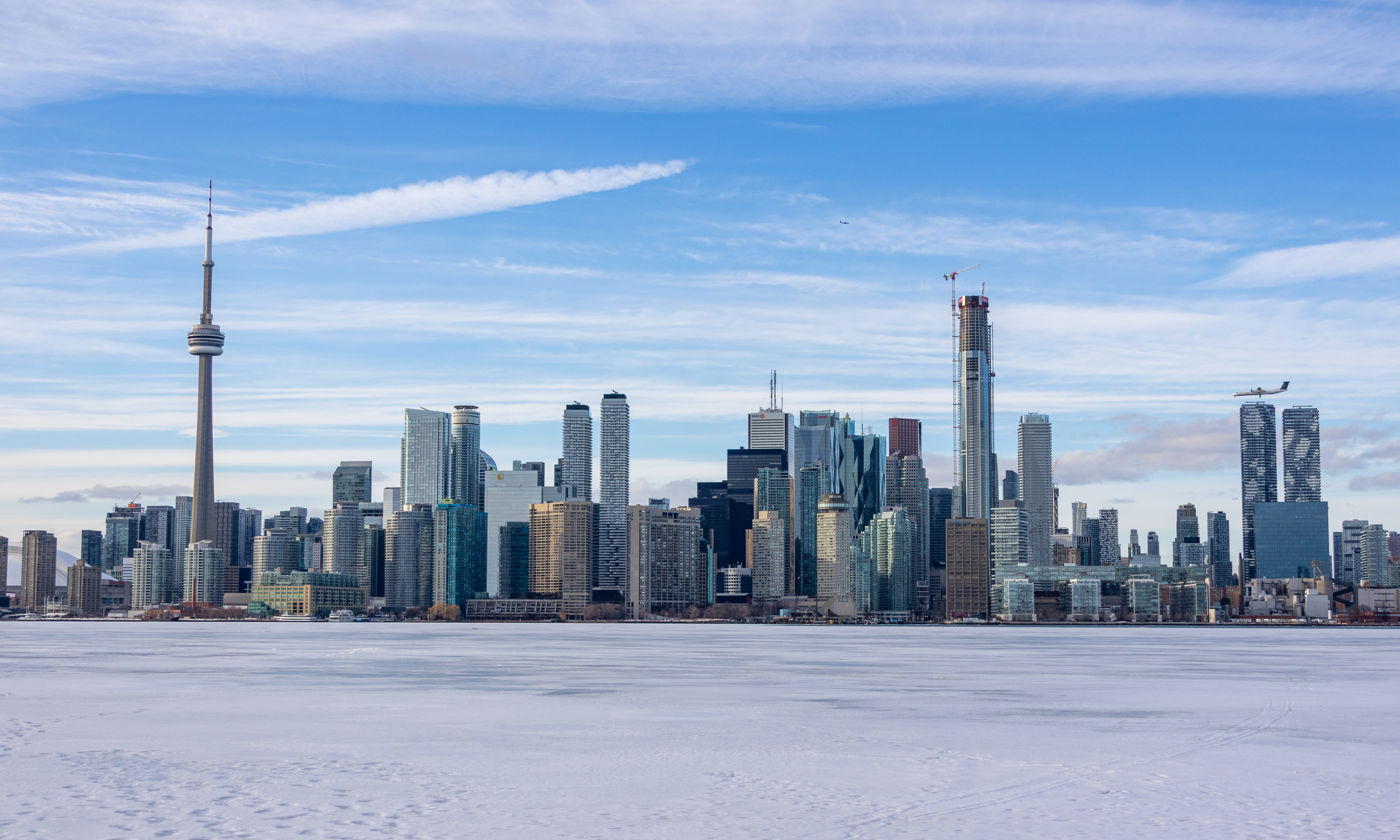
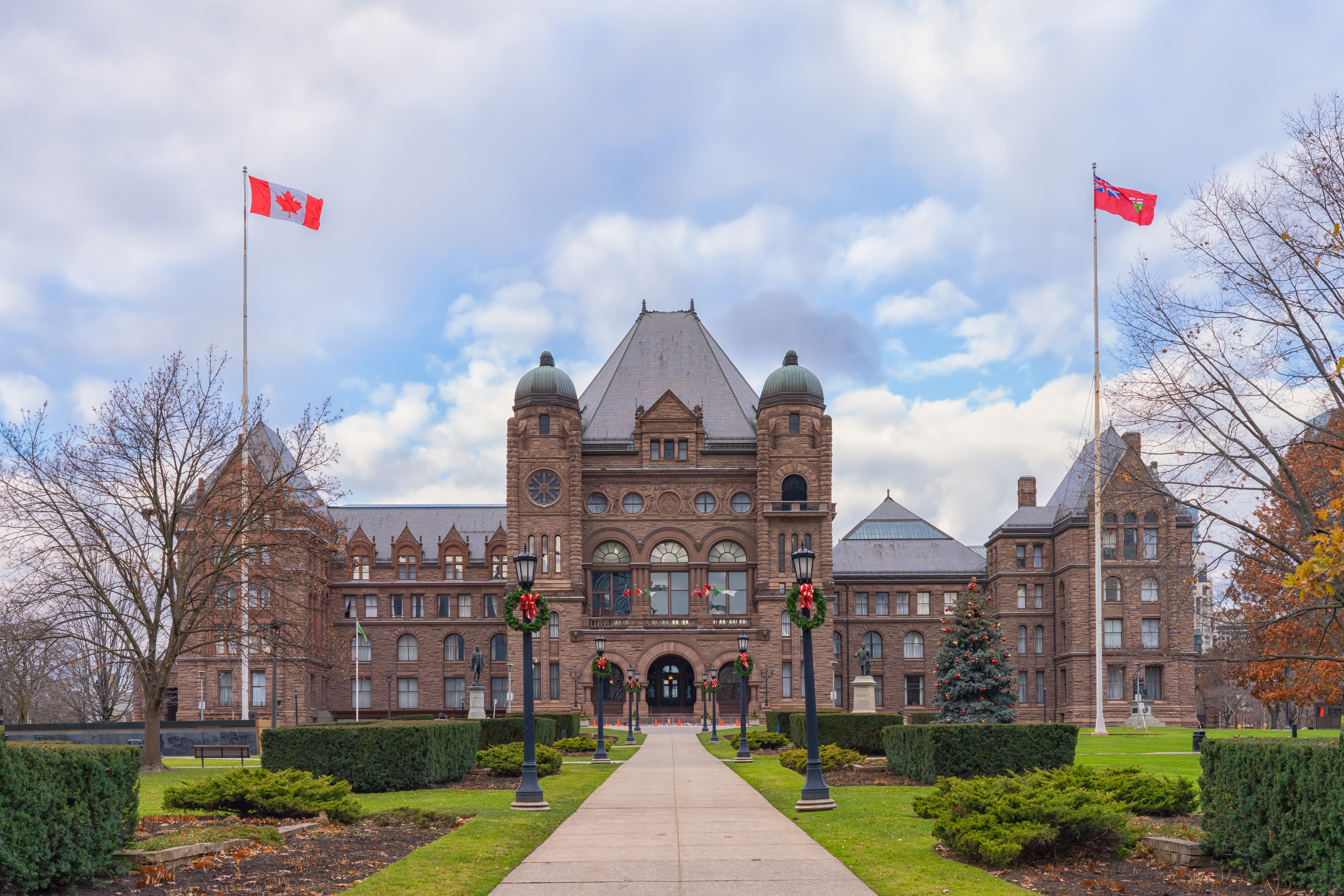
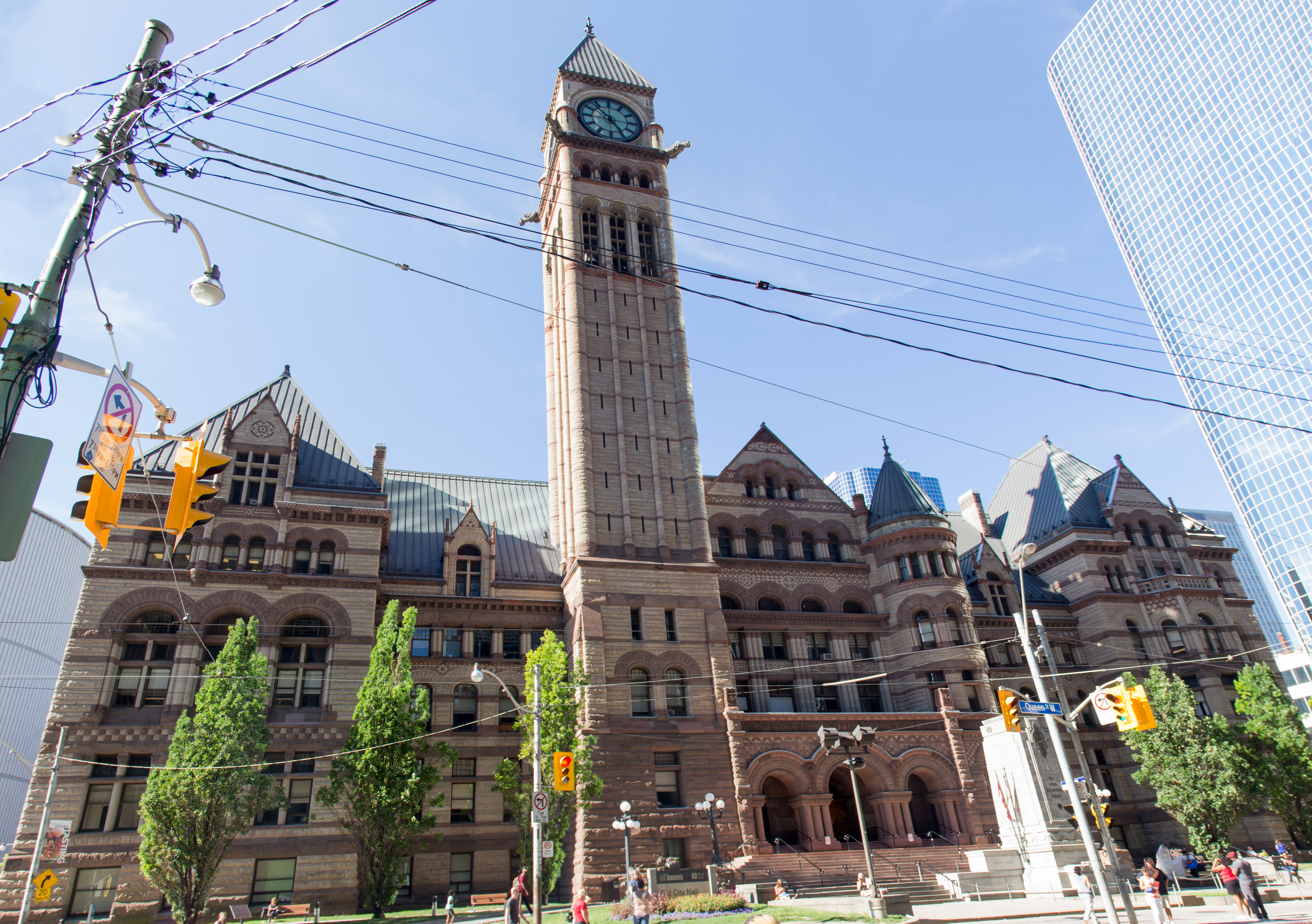
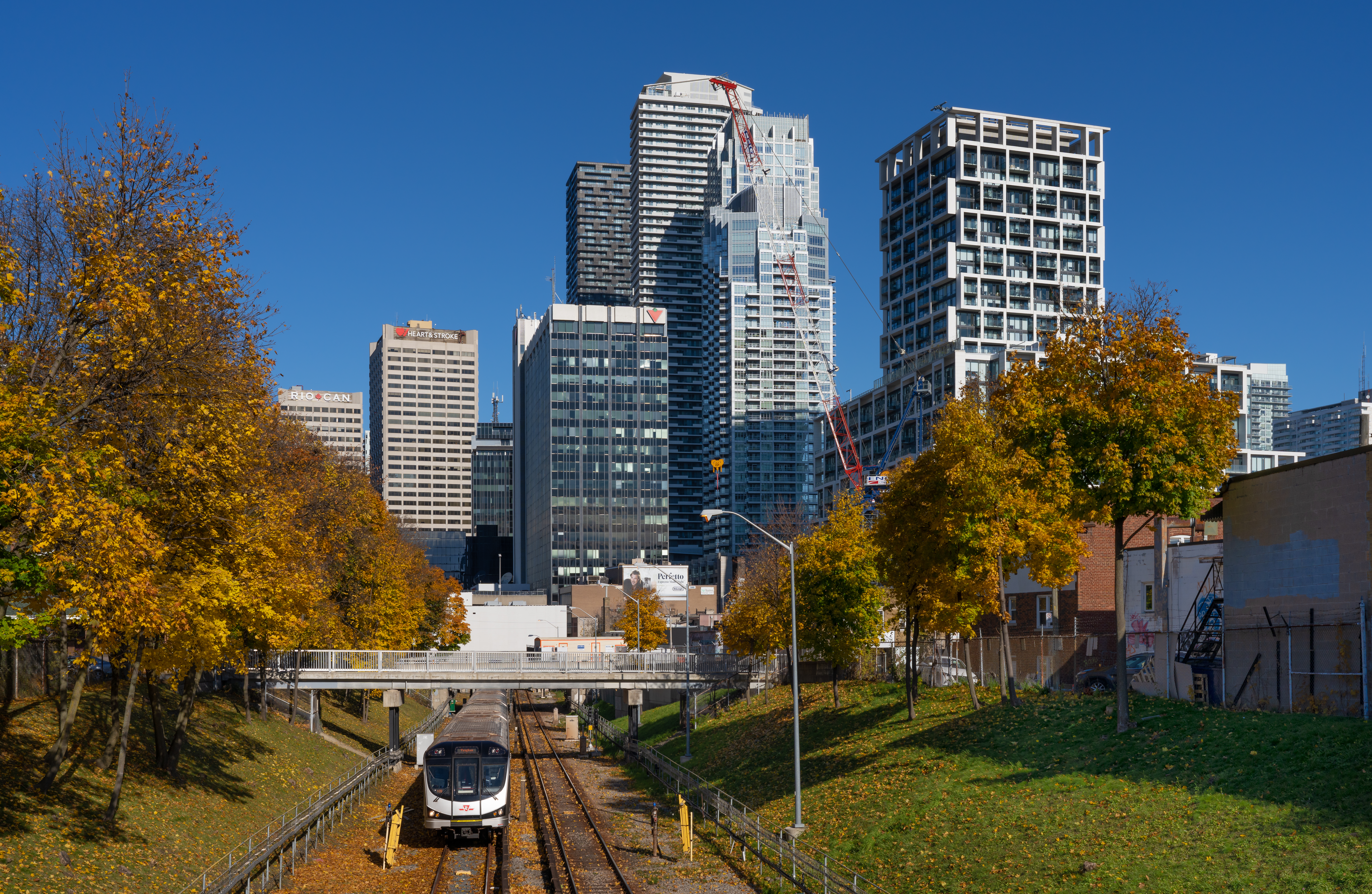
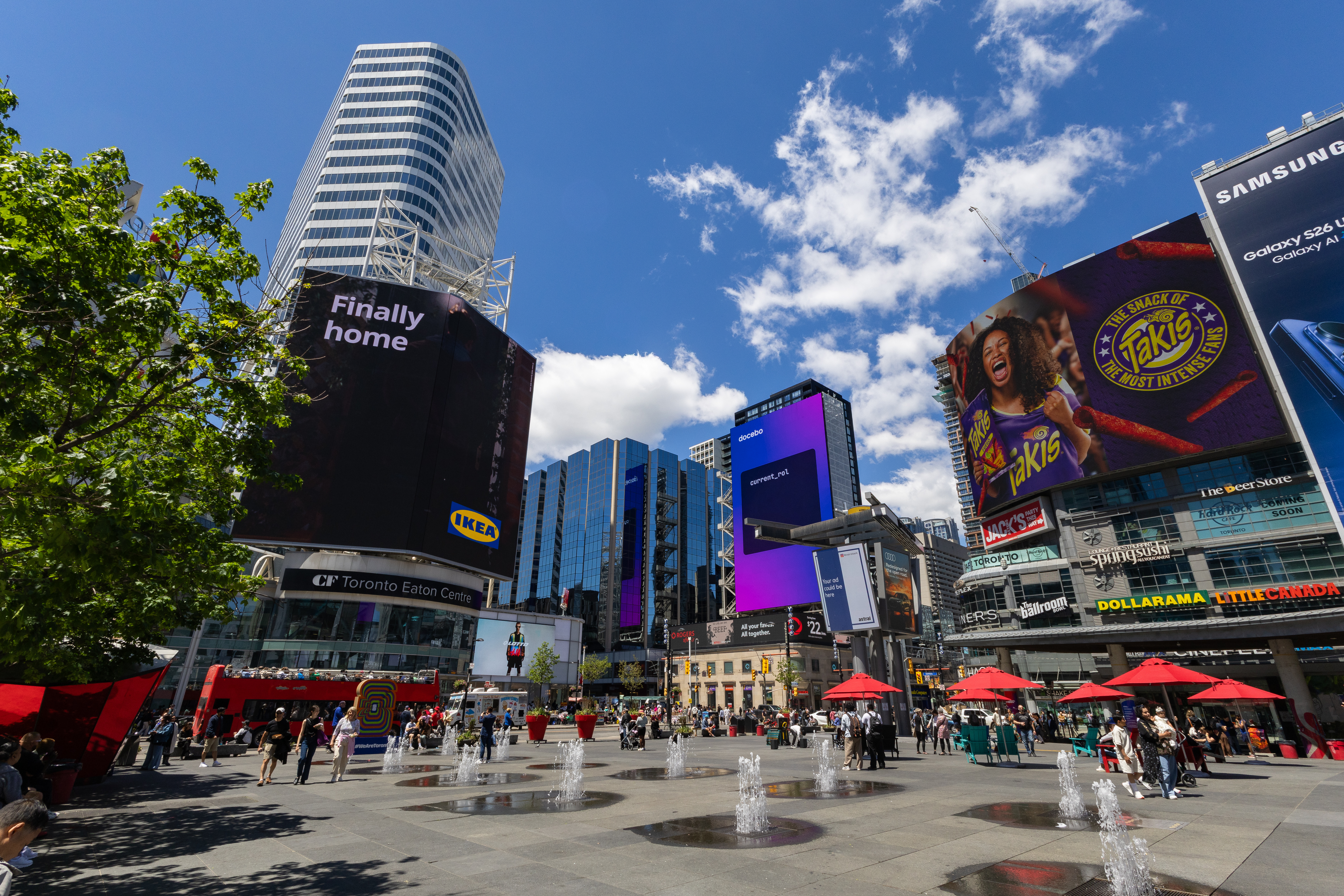
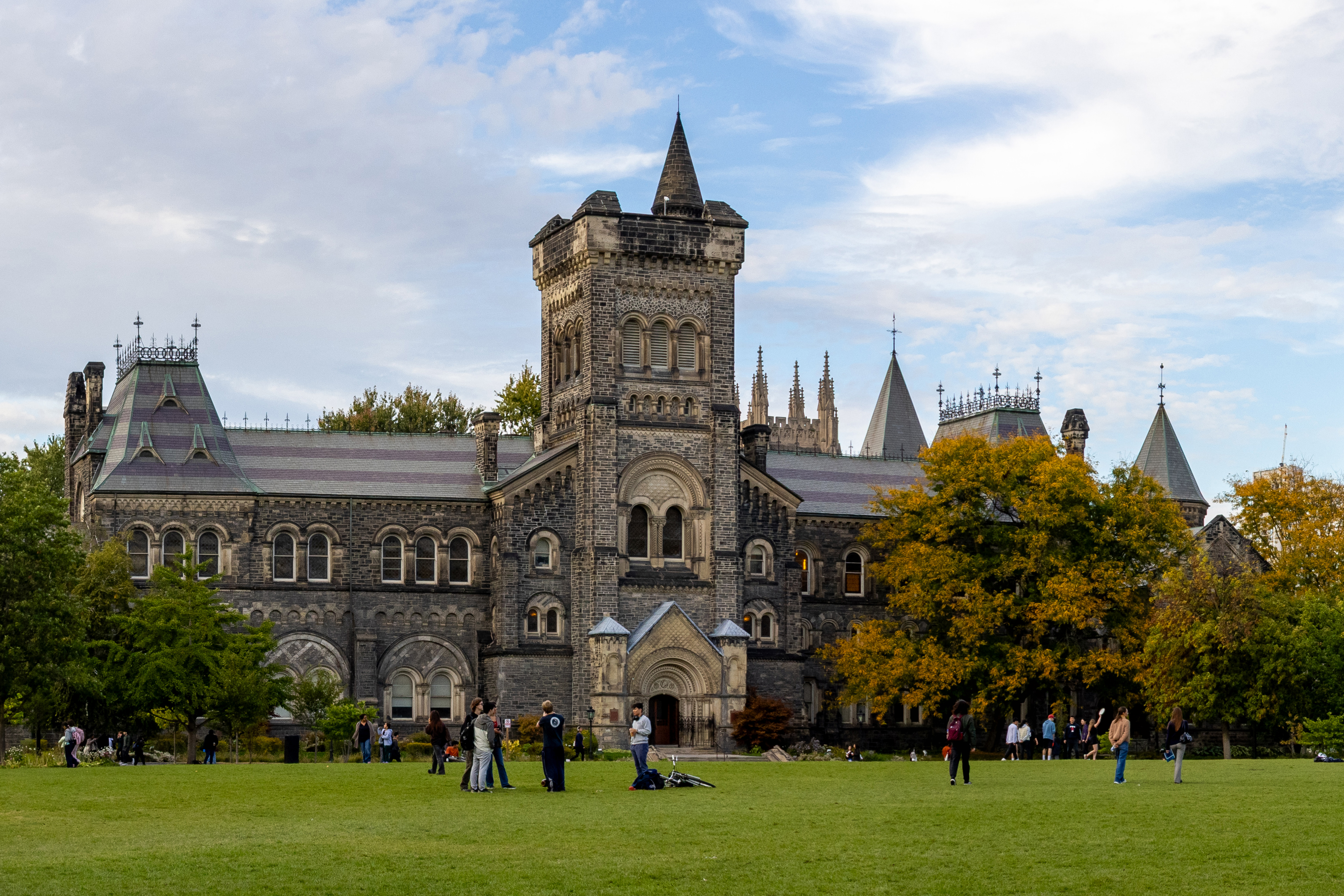
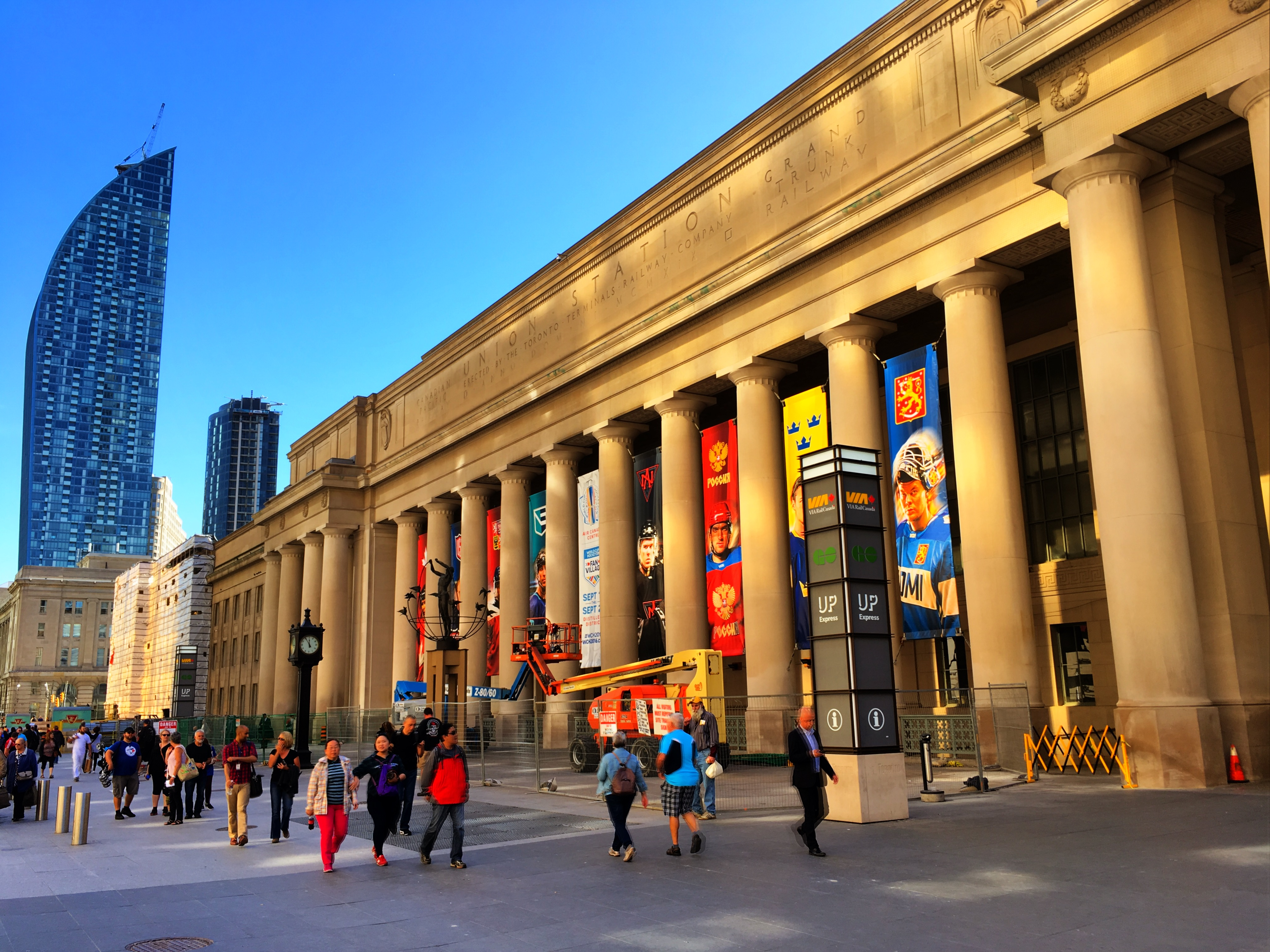
- Skyline of Old Toronto from the Toronto Harbour Ontario Legislative Building Old City Hall Yonge–Eglinton Sankofa Square University of Toronto St. George Union Station

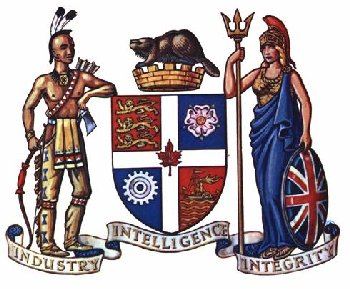
- Flag Coat of arms Logo
- Nicknames: Toronto the Good, Queen City, Hogtown
- Motto: Industry, Intelligence, Integrity
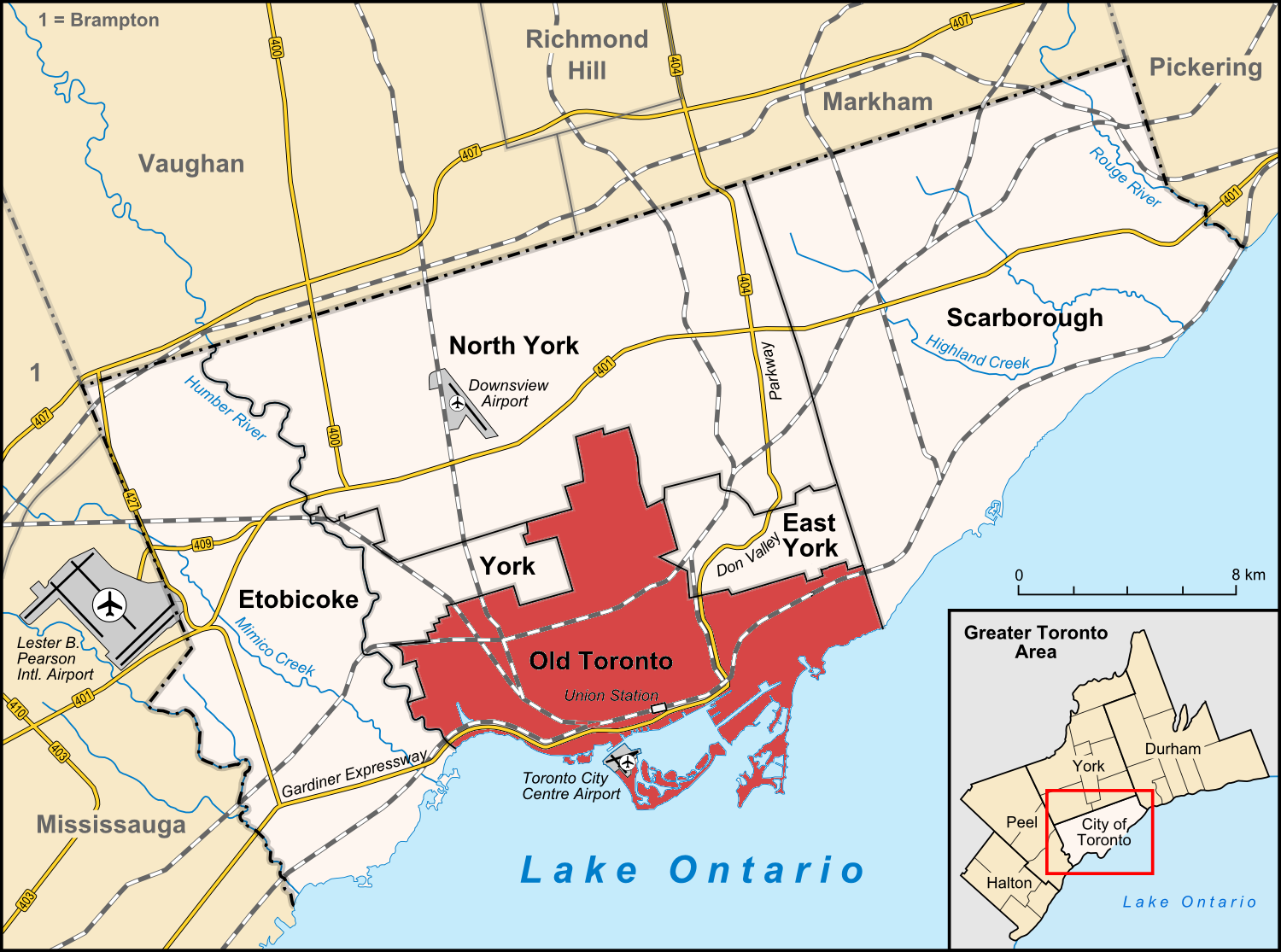
- City of Toronto before 1998 in red
- Interactive map of Old Toronto
- Coordinates: 43°38′57″N 79°22′41″W
- Country: Canada
- Province: Ontario
- City: Toronto
- Established: 6 March 1834 (City of Toronto) from Town of York
- Changed Region: 1 January 1954 Metropolitan Toronto from York County
- Amalgamated: 1 January 1998 into Toronto

Government
  - Mayor: List of mayors of Old Toronto
  - Governing Body: Toronto City Council

Area^{[1]}
  - Total: 97.15 km^{2} (37.51 sq mi)

Population (2021)^{[1]}
  - Total: 841,236
  - Density: 8,659.1/km^{2} (22,427/sq mi)
- Time zone: UTC-5 (EST)
  - Summer (DST): UTC-4 (EDT)
- Area codes: 416, 647, 437

Old Toronto is the part of Toronto, Ontario, Canada, that corresponds to the boundaries of the City of Toronto prior to 1998. It was incorporated as a city in 1834, after being known as the town of York, and being part of York County. Toronto periodically grew in size by annexing adjacent land and municipalities.

In 1954, the City of Toronto and the surrounding suburban towns and townships of southern York County were joined in a federation known as the Municipality of Metropolitan Toronto (Metro). Later, the lower-tier city annexed two towns until it reached its final boundaries in 1967. In 1998, the municipalities of Metro Toronto were amalgamated into the present-day single-tier City of Toronto, which continues legally from the predecessor City of Toronto, although the by-laws of each municipality remained in force.

Historically, "Old Toronto" referred to Toronto's boundaries before the Great Toronto Fire of 1904, when most urban development was to the east of Yonge Street. Since the 1998 amalgamation, the 1967–1998 city proper is referred to as "Old Toronto" or the "former city of Toronto". It is sometimes less accurately referred to as "downtown" or "the core" as Downtown Toronto is located within Old Toronto, which functioned as a downtown and inner city for Metro Toronto overall before amalgamation. Old Toronto has a population density of approximately 8,659 residents per square kilometre, which would rank as Canada's densest (North America's second-densest) city with a population over 100,000 if it were still a distinct city.

== History ==
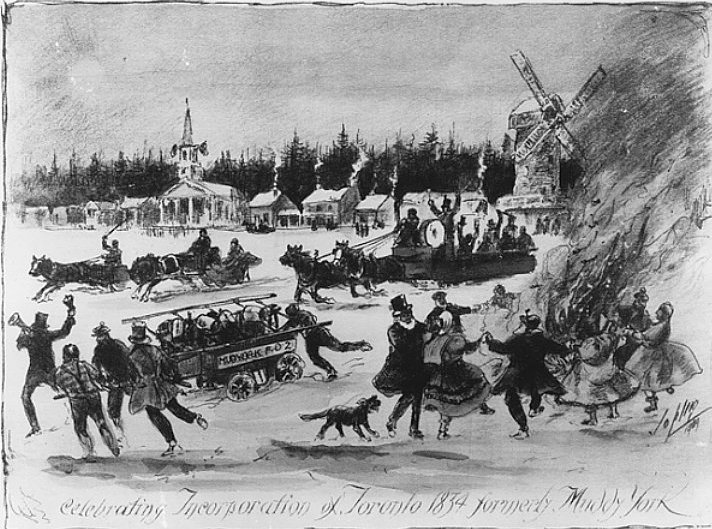
Residents celebrate the incorporation of York into the City of Toronto in 1834.

The former town of York was incorporated on March 6, 1834, reverting to the name Toronto to distinguish it from New York City, as well as about a dozen other localities named "York" in the province (including the county in which Toronto was situated), and to dissociate itself from the negative connotation of "dirty Little York", a common nickname for the town by its residents. The population was recorded in June 1834 at 9,252.

In 1834, Toronto was incorporated with the boundaries of Bathurst Street to the west, 400 yards north of Lot (today's Queen) Street to the north, and Parliament Street to the east. Outside this formal boundary were the "liberties", land pre-destined to be used for new wards. These boundaries were today's Dufferin Street to the west, Bloor Street to the north, and the Don River to the east, with a section along the lakeshore east of the Don and south of today's Queen Street to the approximate location of today's Maclean Street. The liberties formally became part of the city in 1859 and the wards were remapped.

William Lyon Mackenzie, a Reformer, was Toronto's first mayor, a position he only held for one year, losing to Tory Robert Baldwin Sullivan in 1835. Sullivan was replaced by Dr. Thomas David Morrison in 1836. Another Tory, George Gurnett, was elected in 1837. That year, Toronto was the site of the key events of the Upper Canada Rebellion. Mackenzie would eventually lead an assault on Montgomery's Tavern, beginning the Upper Canada Rebellion. The attacks were ineffectual, as British regulars and the Canadian militia in Toronto went out to the camp at Montgomery's Tavern and dispersed the rebels. Mackenzie and some other Reformers escaped to the United States, while other rebel leaders, such as Samuel Lount and Peter Matthews, were hanged. Toronto would thenceforth elect a succession of Tory or Conservative mayors—it was not until the 1850s that a Reform member would be mayor again. Shortly after the rebellion, Toronto was ravaged by its first great fire in 1849. The fire was one of two great fires to occur in the city, with the other occurring in 1904.

It is a matter of deep regret that political differences should have run high in this place, and led to most discreditable and disgraceful results. It is not long since guns were discharged from a window in this town at the successful candidates in an election, and the coachman of one of them was actually shot in the body, though not dangerously wounded. But one man was killed on the same occasion; and from the very window whence he received his death, the very flag which shielded his murderer (not only in the commission of his crime, but from its consequences), was displayed again on the occasion of the public ceremony performed by the Governor General, to which I have just adverted. Of all the colours in the rainbow, there is but one which could be so employed: I need not say that flag was orange.

— Charles Dickens, commenting on 1841 Toronto Orange violence in American Notes for General Circulation, 1842

In their efforts to control the city and its citizens, the Tories were willing to turn to extra-governmental tools of social control, such as the Orange Order in Canada. As historian Gregory Kealey concluded, "Following the delegitimation of Reform after the Rebellions were suppressed, the Corporation (of Toronto) developed into an impenetrable bastion of Orange-Tory strength." By 1844, six of Toronto's ten aldermen were Orangemen, and, over the rest of the 19th century, twenty of twenty-three mayors would be as well. A parliamentary committee reporting on the 1841 Orange Riot in Toronto concluded that the powers granted the corporation made it ripe for Orange abuse. Orange influence dominated the emerging police force, giving it a "monopoly of legal violence, and the power to choose when to enforce the law." Orange Order violence at elections and other political meetings was a staple of the period. Between 1839 and 1866, the Orange Order was involved in 29 riots in Toronto, of which 16 had direct political inspiration.

At its height in 1942, 16 of the 23 members of city council were members of the Orange Order. Every mayor of Toronto in the first half of the 20th century was an Orangeman. This continued until the 1954 election when the Jewish Nathan Phillips defeated radical Orange leader Leslie Howard Saunders.

=== Annexations and amalgamations ===
The boundaries of Toronto remained unchanged into the 1880s. Then followed a series of expansions lasting to the 1910s: Toronto expanded to the west by annexing the Town of Brockton in 1884, the Town of Parkdale in 1889, and properties west to Swansea (such as High Park) by 1893; to the north by annexing Yorkville in 1883, The Annex in 1887, Seaton Village in 1888, Rosedale in 1905, Deer Park in 1908, the City of West Toronto, Bracondale, and Wychwood Park in 1909, Dovercourt Park and Earlscourt in 1910, and Moore Park and North Toronto in 1912; and to the east by annexing Riverdale in 1884, a strip east of Greenwood in 1890, Town of East Toronto (including East Danforth and Upper Beaches) in 1908, an extension east to Victoria Park Avenue in 1909, and the Midway (bounded by Danforth Avenue in north, Greenwood Avenue to west, Queen Street to south and East Toronto western boundaries to the east) in 1909. By 1908, the named wards were abolished, replaced by a simple numbering scheme of Ward 1 to Ward 6.

By the 1920s, Toronto stopped annexing suburbs. In 1954, the municipalities in York County south of Steeles Avenue were severed from the county to form the aforementioned Municipality of Metropolitan Toronto (a precursor to later regional municipalities), which included Toronto and numerous suburbs. Metropolitan Toronto operated as an upper-tier municipal government whereas Toronto continued to operate as a lower-tier government within Metropolitan Toronto. In 1967, provincial reform of lower-tier municipalities in Metropolitan Toronto saw Toronto annex the municipalities of Forest Hill and Swansea. The City of Toronto remained this size until 1998, when it was formally dissolved and its area amalgamated into the new single-tier City of Toronto. The new City of Toronto was formed from Old Toronto, the five other dissolved municipalities that made up Metropolitan Toronto, and that upper tier itself in 1997.

== Demographics ==
Federal census population history of Toronto
Year	Pop.	±%
1851	30,775	—
1861	44,821	+45.6%
1871	56,092	+25.1%
1881	86,415	+54.1%
1891	181,215	+109.7%
1901	208,040	+14.8%
1911	376,471	+81.0%
1921	521,893	+38.6%
1931	631,207	+20.9%
1941	667,457	+5.7%
1951	675,754	+1.2%
1956	667,706	−1.2%
1961	672,407	+0.7%
1966	664,584	−1.2%
1971	712,786	+7.3%
1976	633,318	−11.1%
1981	599,217	−5.4%
1986	612,289	+2.2%
1991	635,395	+3.8%
1996	653,734	+2.9%
2001	676,352	+3.5%
Source: Statistics Canada

Largest ethnic origin in Old Toronto by census tract based on the 2021 census

Panethnic groups in Old Toronto (1996−2021)
Panethnic group	2021 Canadian census (Note: Total of 179 census tracts from 5350001.00 through 5350142.00 in the Toronto CMA, all situated in the former Toronto census subdivision.)		2016 Canadian census (Note: Total of 174 census tracts from 5350001.00 through 5350142.00 in the Toronto CMA, all situated in the former Toronto census subdivision.)		2011 Canadian census (Note: Total of 160 census tracts from 5350001.00 through 5350142.00 in the Toronto CMA, all situated in the former Toronto census subdivision.)		2006 Canadian census (Note: Total of 155 census tracts from 5350001.00 through 5350142.00 in the Toronto CMA, all situated in the former Toronto census subdivision.)		2001 Canadian census		1996 Canadian census	
Panethnic group	Pop.	%	Pop.	%	Pop.	%	Pop.	%	Pop.	%	Pop.	%
European (Note: Statistic includes all persons that did not make up part of a visible minority or an indigenous identity.)	492,470	59.53%	509,355	65.28%	484,190	68.2%	456,540	68.93%	462,110	69.25%	457,725	70.8%
East Asian (Note: Statistic includes total responses of "Chinese", "Korean", and "Japanese" under visible minority section on census.)	99,190	11.99%	89,985	11.53%	76,020	10.71%	74,360	11.23%	74,935	11.23%	68,740	10.63%
South Asian	66,265	8.01%	47,085	6.03%	36,635	5.16%	32,365	4.89%	31,325	4.69%	27,340	4.23%
African	48,100	5.81%	38,565	4.94%	32,755	4.61%	34,510	5.21%	35,295	5.29%	33,650	5.21%
Southeast Asian (Note: Statistic includes total responses of "Filipino" and "Southeast Asian" under visible minority section on census.)	37,190	4.5%	31,120	3.99%	30,950	4.36%	24,825	3.75%	27,740	4.16%	27,450	4.25%
Latin American	25,550	3.09%	18,135	2.32%	15,720	2.21%	14,135	2.13%	12,615	1.89%	11,720	1.81%
Middle Eastern (Note: Statistic includes total responses of "West Asian" and "Arab" under visible minority section on census.)	22,865	2.76%	17,370	2.23%	12,040	1.7%	8,120	1.23%	8,520	1.28%	7,685	1.19%
Indigenous	9,670	1.17%	9,385	1.2%	7,215	1.02%	5,630	0.85%	4,425	0.66%	3,245	0.5%
Other/multiracial (Note: Statistic includes total responses of "Visible minority, n.i.e." and "Multiple visible minorities" under visible minority section on census.)	25,980	3.14%	19,310	2.47%	14,440	2.03%	11,810	1.78%	10,345	1.55%	8,920	1.38%
Total responses	827,280	98.34%	780,310	97.83%	709,965	97.17%	662,295	97.51%	667,325	98.67%	646,480	98.89%
Total population	841,236	100%	797,642	100%	730,656	100%	679,236	100%	676,352	100%	653,734	100%
Note: Totals greater than 100% due to multiple origin responses.

== Culture ==
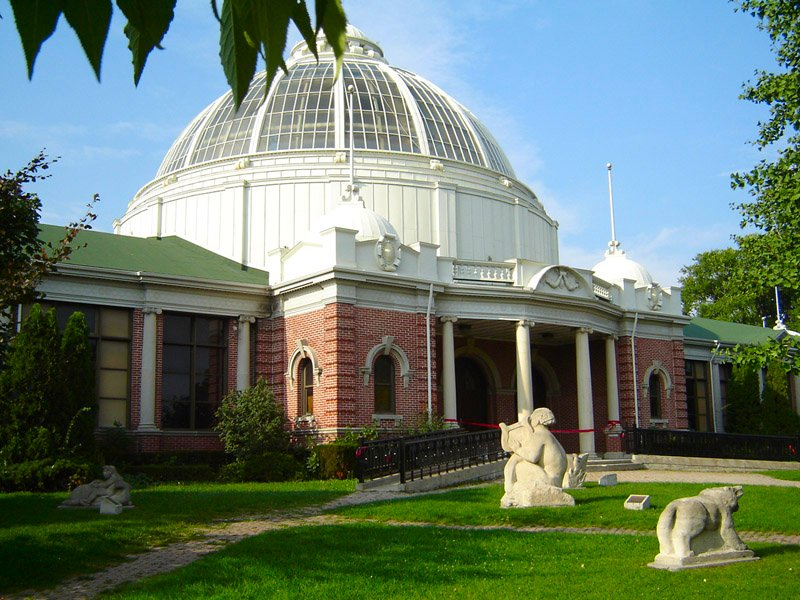
The Horticulture Building, used for the Canadian National Exhibition. The building was built in 1907 to replace the Exhibition's second Crystal Palace.

The first Crystal Palace in Toronto, officially named the Palace of Industry, was modelled after the Crystal Palace in Hyde Park, London, England, and was Toronto's first permanent exhibition hall. Completed in 1858, it was located south of the Provincial Lunatic Asylum, northwest of King and Shaw streets. It was dismantled in 1878, and the ironwork was used to construct a new Crystal Palace on what would later become Exhibition Place. The second Crystal Palace hosted Toronto's first Industrial Exhibition (the predecessor to the Canadian National Exhibition or CNE) in 1879. By the time it was destroyed in 1906 by fire, it was officially known as the CNE Transportation Building. It was replaced by the Horticulture Building in 1907.

== Institutions ==
=== Health care ===
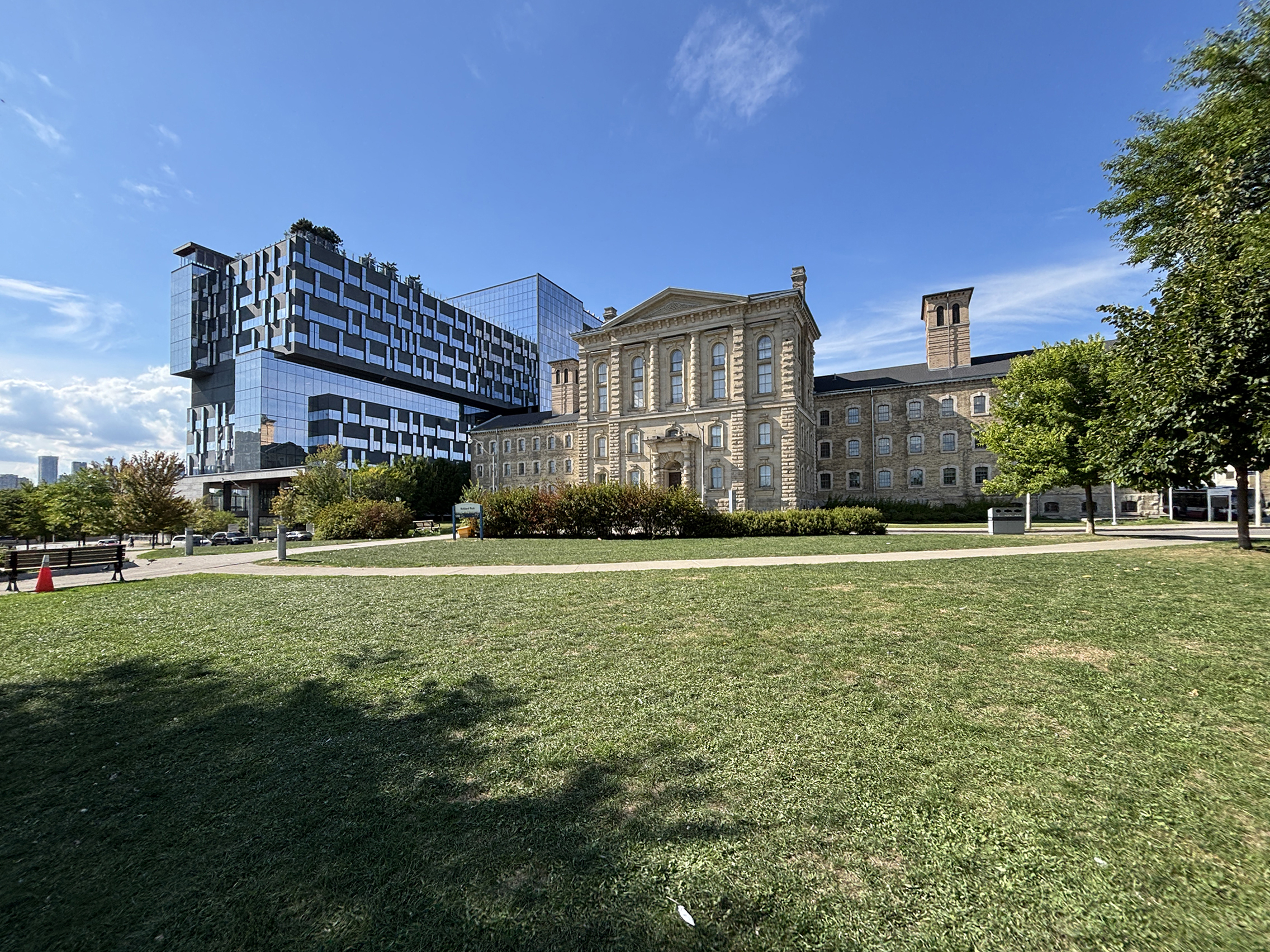
Bridgepoint Active Healthcare is one of several health care institutions in Old Toronto. The institution presently includes the former Don Jail building.

Old Toronto was home to a number of hospitals, including Bridgepoint Active Healthcare (originally named House of Refuge, see below), Casey House, Mount Sinai Hospital, Princess Margaret Cancer Centre (originally named Princess Margaret Hospital), St. Joseph's Health Centre, St. Michael's Hospital, The Hospital for Sick Children, Toronto Grace Health Centre, Toronto Western Hospital and Women's College Hospital. Two health care institutions were also established in 1998 by amalgamating previously separate hospitals: the Toronto Rehabilitation Institute and the Centre for Addiction and Mental Health.

The Toronto General Hospital is the oldest operating hospital established in Toronto. It started as a small shed in the old town and was used as a military hospital during the War of 1812, after which it was founded as a permanent institution, York General Hospital, in 1829, at John and King streets. In 1853–1856, a new home for the hospital was built on the north side of Gerrard Street, east of Parliament, using a design by architect William Hay, and relocated to University Avenue at College Street in 1913.

The House of Providence on Power Street (between King and Queen streets) was opened by the Sisters of St. Joseph in 1857 to aid the plight of the desperately poor. It was demolished in 1962 to make way for the Richmond Street exit from the Don Valley Parkway. By that time it was a nursing home, and its residents moved to a new facility at St. Clair and Warden Avenues, known today as Providence Healthcare.

The House of Refuge was built in 1860 as a home for "vagrants, the dissolute, and for idiots". The building became a smallpox hospital during an epidemic during the 1870s. It was demolished in 1894, and a new structure called the Riverdale Isolation Hospital was built on the site in 1904, which evolved into the Rivderdale Hospital and later Bridgepoint Health.

=== Public library ===
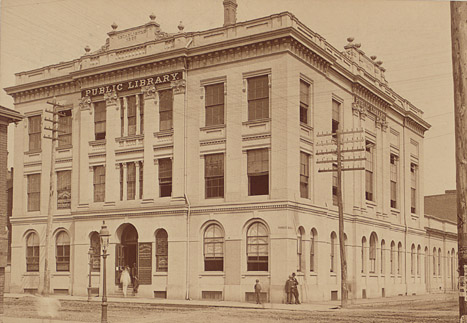
The Toronto Mechanics' Institute in 1884. The institute, whose collection was later absorbed by the Toronto Public Library in 1884, was established in 1830.

Toronto has operated the Toronto Public Library system since 1884. Its collection originated from The Mechanics Institute, which was founded in 1830 by reform Alderman James Lesslie to provide technical and adult education. In 1853 the Institute erected a new permanent home at the corner of Church and Adelaide streets, but it struggled to attract new paying members. In 1883 the institute was thus transformed into a municipally supported public reference library. The idea was promoted by alderman John Hallam, but it met considerable resistance in city council. No other city in Canada at this time had a completely free public library. Hallam brought the initiative to a public referendum, and the citizens of Toronto voted in its favour on January 1, 1883. The 5,000-book collection of the Mechanics' Institute became the first books of the newly formed Toronto Public Library.

As a result of the 1998 amalgamation of Toronto, the other municipal libraries of Metropolitan Toronto were merged with Toronto Public Library. It also merged with the Metro Toronto Public Library, which operated one branch, the Toronto Reference Library in Old Toronto.

=== Education ===
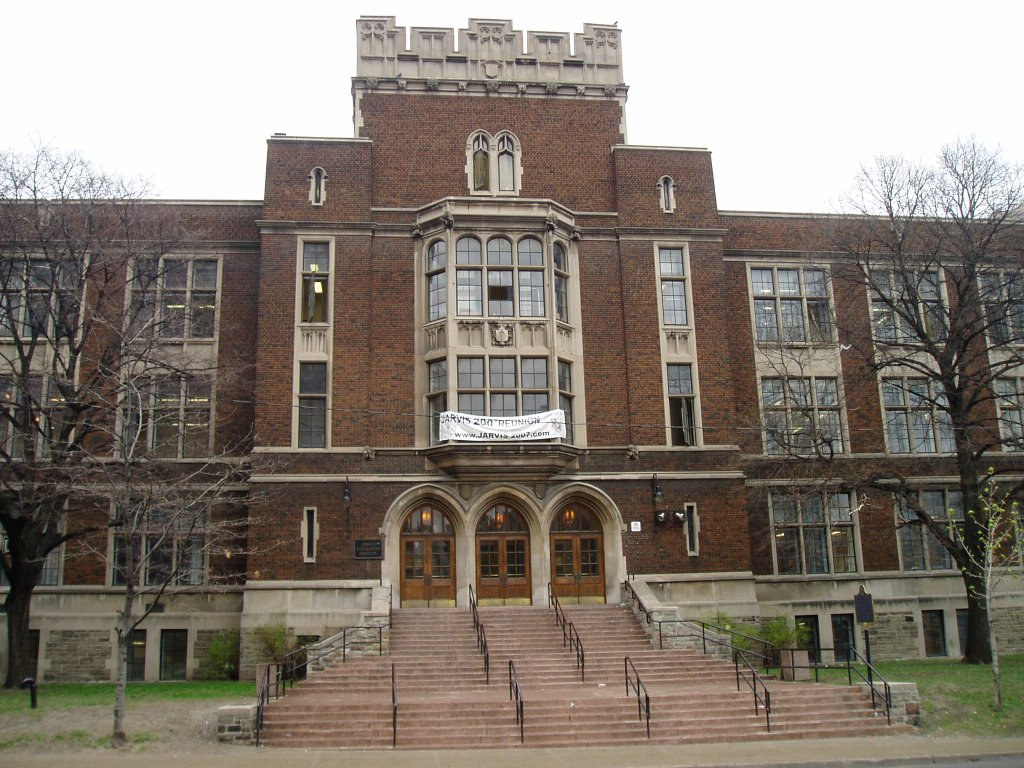
Jarvis Collegiate Institute is one of several public secondary schools located in Old Toronto.

Four public school boards provide primary and secondary education for residents of Old Toronto, Conseil scolaire catholique MonAvenir (CSCM), Conseil scolaire Viamonde (CSV), the Toronto Catholic District School Board (TCDSB), and the Toronto District School Board (TDSB). CSV and TDSB are secular public school boards, operating respectively a French first language institution and English first language institutions. The other two school boards, CSCM and TCDSB, are public separate school boards, operating French first language separate schools and English first language separate schools. Before 1998, the Toronto Board of Education and Conseil des écoles françaises de la communauté urbaine de Toronto had operated public secular schools while the Metropolitan Separate School Board (French: Les Conseil des écoles catholiques du Grand Toronto) had operated public separate schools. These were reorganized upon the amalgamation into the City of Toronto.

Old Toronto hosts Toronto Metropolitan University, the University of Toronto's St. George campus, OCAD University, George Brown College and several other post-secondary institutions.

== Politics ==
=== Capital ===
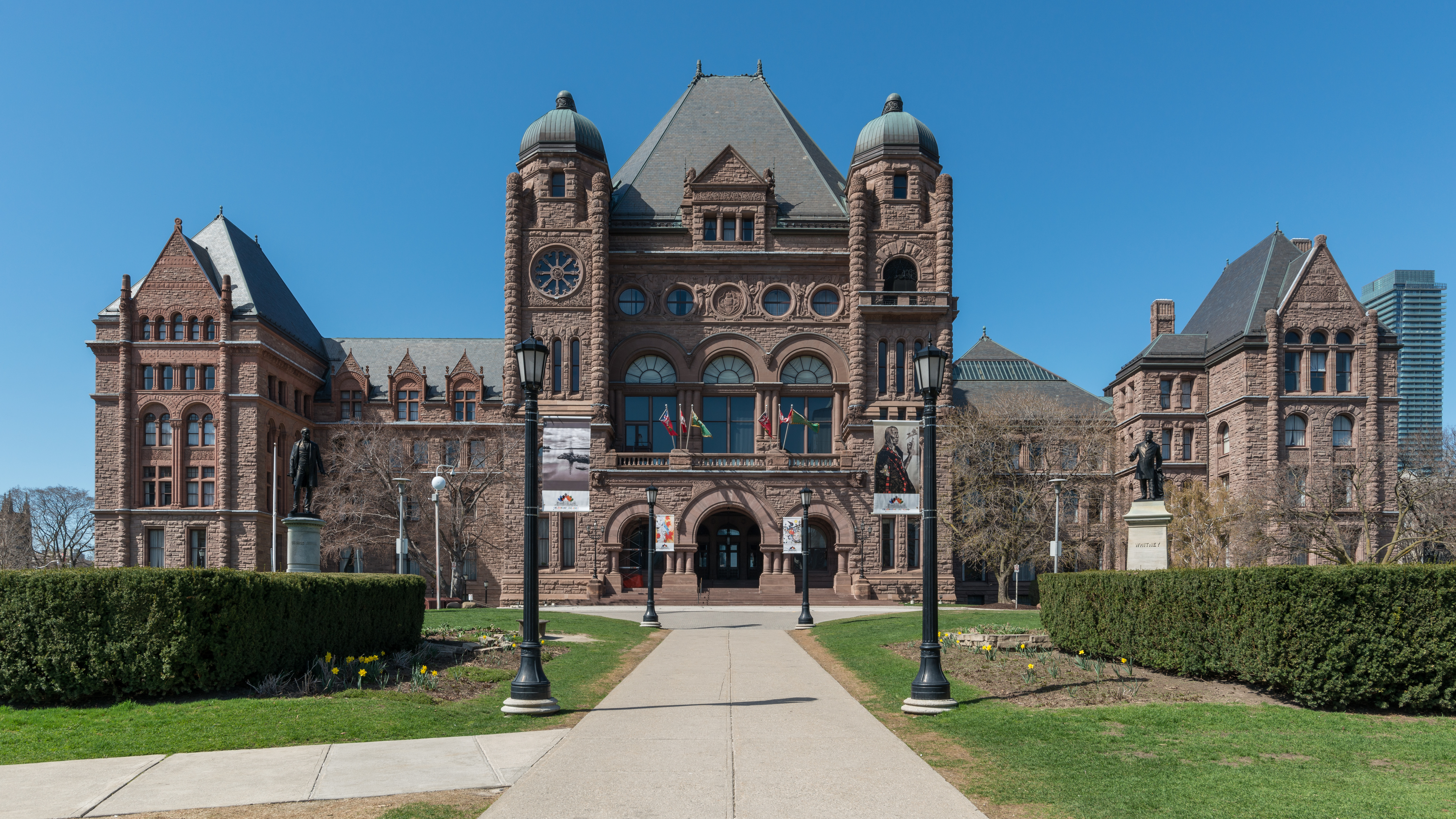
Built in 1893, the Ontario Legislative Building houses the Legislative Assembly of Ontario.

The first Upper Canada parliament buildings were built in 1796 at Front and Parliament streets when the capital of the Province was moved from Niagara-on-the-Lake. These were destroyed in 1813 during an attack on the then-City of York during the War of 1812. A second building was constructed on the same site in 1820, only to be lost to fire in 1824. They were replaced by a new structure built between 1829 and 1832 near Front, John, Simcoe, and Wellington streets, which saw alterations take place in 1849.

With the unification of Upper and Lower Canada in 1840, the building continued to see sporadic periods of usage as the legislature of the Province of Canada until the capital was permanently moved to what is now Ottawa shortly before Confederation in 1867, which saw the formation of the modern-day province of Ontario (the same area as Upper Canada). Upon Confederation, Toronto was selected to be the provincial capital and thus the Front Street building returned to usage as the location of the provincial legislature until the current Legislative Buildings at Queen's Park were completed in 1893. The Front Street building remained vacant until it was demolished in 1903; the Canadian Broadcasting Centre now sits on the site.

Chorley Park, located in the Rosedale neighbourhood, served as the official residence of the Lieutenant-Governor of Ontario from 1915 to 1937. The building was demolished in 1961 after it and the lands around it were purchased by the municipal government.

=== Municipal politics ===
==== City council ====
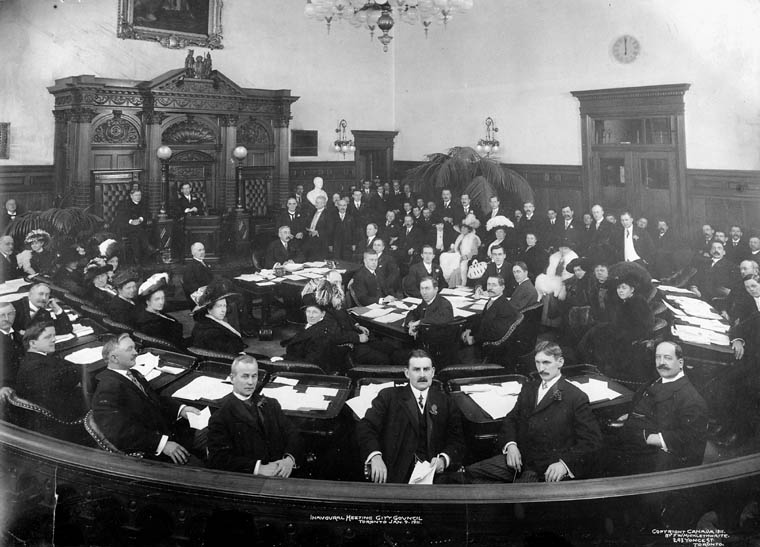
Meeting of the Toronto City Council in January 1911

In 1833, several prominent reformers had petitioned the House of Assembly to have the town incorporated, which would also have made the position of magistrate elective. The Tory-controlled House struggled to find a means of creating a legitimate electoral system that might nonetheless minimize the chances of reformers being elected. The bill passed on March 6, 1834, proposed two different property qualifications for voting. There was a higher qualification for the election of aldermen (who would also serve as magistrates) and a lower one for common councillors. Two aldermen and two councilmen would be elected from each city ward. This relatively broad electorate was offset by a much higher qualification for election to office, which essentially limited election to the wealthy, much like the old Courts of Quarter Sessions it replaced. The mayor was elected by the aldermen from among their number, and a clear barrier was erected between those of property who served as full magistrates and the rest. Only 230 of the city's 2,929 adult men met this stringent property qualification.

==== City halls ====
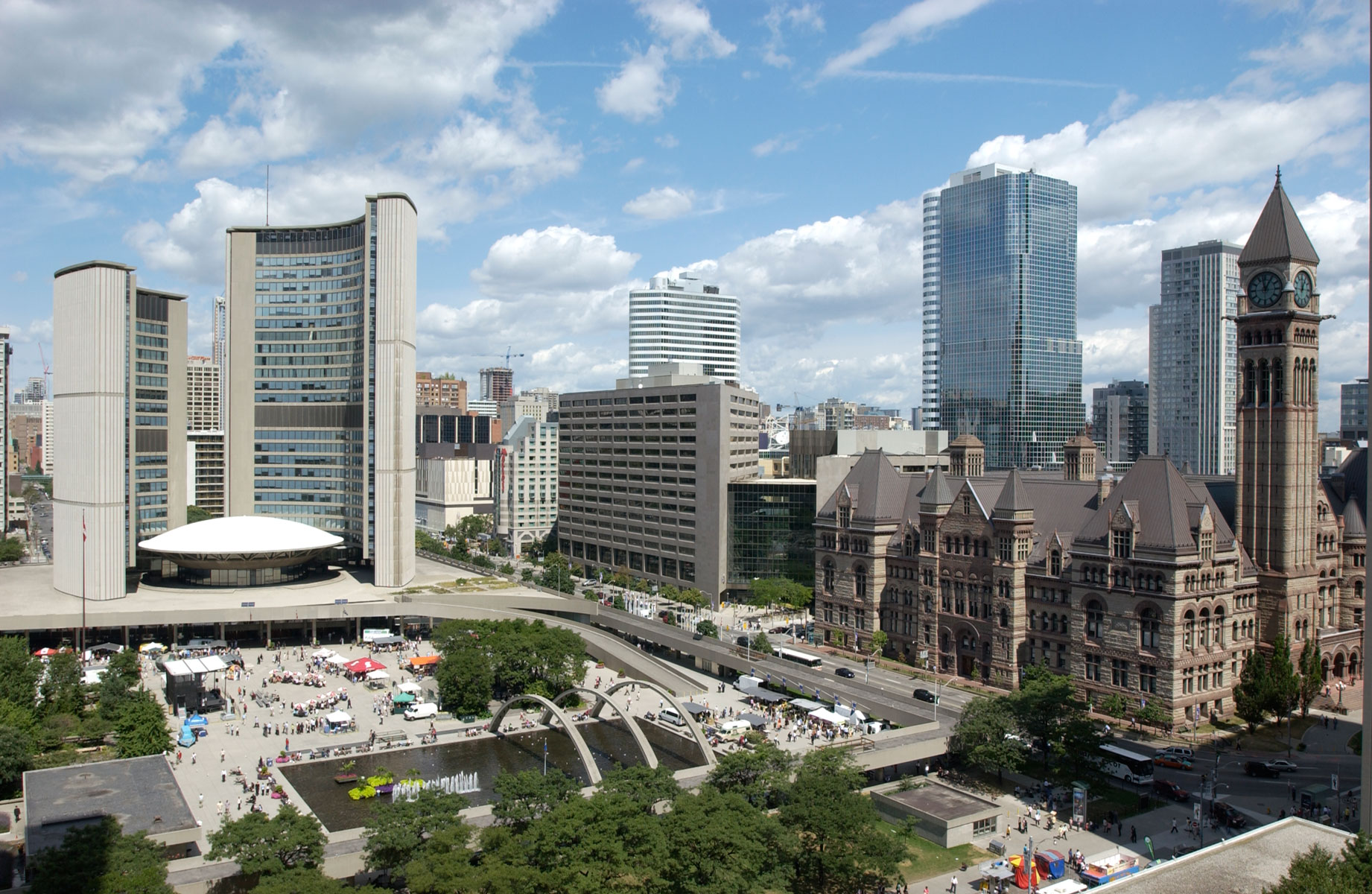
Toronto City Hall (left) next to Old City Hall (right). The latter building was used from 1899 to 1965, whereas the former has been used since 1965.

The second market building replaced the original wooden market building in 1831 and ran from King Street to Front Street (the site of the current St. Lawrence Hall, and the St. Lawrence Market North building). It was selected by the first mayor, William Lyon Mackenzie, as city hall. His newspaper, the Colonial Advocate, rented space in the rear. This building, along with much of the surrounding Market Block, was destroyed by fire in the 1849 Cathedral Fire. The site was rebuilt as St. Lawrence Hall in 1850.

The second city hall, built in 1845 and renovated in 1850, was known as the New Market House. It served as city hall until 1899. In 1904, the current St. Lawrence Market South building was built, incorporating part of the city hall structure. Toronto third city hall began construction in 1889, and was completed a decade later, in 1899. Old City Hall was also used as a court house (assuming the role of the closed Adelaide Street Court House, closed in 1900), and continues to be used as a dedicated court house. The third city hall was used by the Toronto City Council from 1899 to 1965, when they moved to the completed fourth Toronto City Hall.

==== Ward system ====
The earliest Toronto neighbourhoods were the five municipal wards that the city was split into in 1834. The wards were named for the patron saints of the four nations of the British Isles (St. George, St. Andrew, St. Patrick, and St. David) and St. Lawrence, a patron saint of Canada (St. Joseph is the principal patron saint of Canada). Today, only St. Lawrence remains a well-known neighbourhood name. The others have attached their names to a variety of still-existing landmarks, including three subway stations. As Toronto grew, more wards were created, still named after prominent saints. St. James Ward is preserved in the modern St. James Town neighbourhood, while the northern ward of St. Paul's has continued to the present as a federal and provincial electoral district.

== See also ==
- Downtown Toronto
