= Henry Cummings Campbell =

Canadian educator and librarian

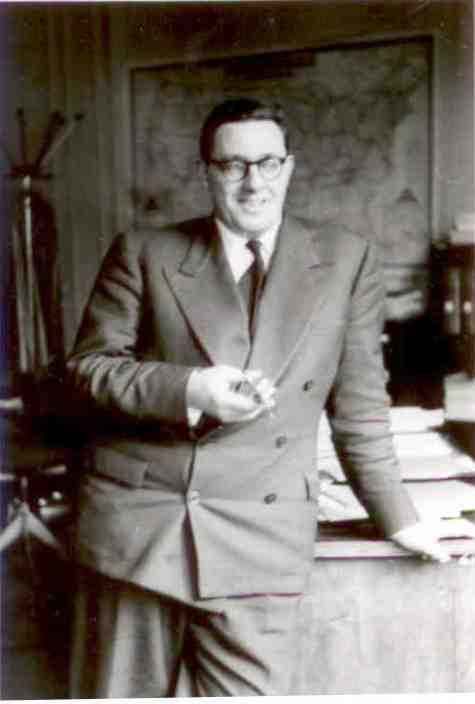
Henry Cummings Campbell, c. 1950.

Henry Cummings Campbell BA BLS MA (April 22, 1919 - July 31, 2009) was a Canadian educator and librarian, and Chief Librarian of the Toronto Public Library.

== Career ==
Henry C. Campbell worked as a producer at the National Film Board of Canada under the direction of John Grierson from 1941 to 1946. He worked at the United Nations Archives in New York from 1946 to 1949 and was Programme Director at the UNESCO Library Division in Paris from 1949 to 1956. He was Chief Librarian of the Toronto Public Library from 1956 to 1978, and oversaw the creation of the Metropolitan Toronto Public Library in 1967. In 1959, he also founded Books for the Developing World, which eventually became the Canadian Organization for Development through Education (CODE), with Roby Kidd and Marion McFarland of the Canadian Association of Adult Education and Kurt Swinton of Encyclopædia Britannica. He served as president of the Canadian Library Association in 1973-1974 and was First Vice President of the International Federation of Library Associations and Institutions (IFLA) from 1974 to 1979. He was president of the Federation of Canada-China Friendship Associations from 1984 to 1986 and president of the Ex Libris Association of retired librarians in 2002, of which he was also co-founder in 1986.

== Contribution to the Toronto Public Library ==
Henry C. Campbell was the first Chief Librarian of the Toronto Public Library (1956 to 1978) to hold a professional library degree. He is credited for having contributed to the expansion of the library and its adaptation to an increasingly dynamic and multicultural city. New services were offered, such as the Film Department, Library on Wheels, the Marguerite G. Bagshaw Puppetry Collection and Theatre, the Northern District Library with reading machines for the visually impaired, language self-instruction centres, a Young People’s Department, the Spaced Out Library of science fiction, the Metropolitan Bibliographic Centre, the West Indian Collection at Parkdale Branch, and the First Nations/Aboriginal Collection at Spadina Road. The Lillian H. Smith Collection of Children’s Books was established in 1962 to mark the 50th anniversary of children’s services and Community Information Posts were established at the Parliament Street and Parkdale Branches in 1969. Henry C. Campbell also contributed, along with the Board of the Toronto Public Library, to the creation of the Metropolitan Toronto Library Board and the Metropolitan Reference Library (now the Toronto Reference Library).

In 1963, Theresa G. Falkner, chair of the Toronto Public Library, wrote in her annual report of a "dynamic new climate" at the library, of electricity in the air, experimentation going on and a feeling of excitement. She described the situation as follows: "The human dynamo generating this vibrating wind of change in the library is Harry C. Campbell. Dr. Sanderson did well to recommend him to the board as his successor. In our chief librarian we have a brilliant driving force, fearless, optimistic and tireless. His vigorous leadership is deeply appreciated by the Board."

== Recognitions ==
- Establishment of the Harry Campbell IFLA Conference Attendance Grant to assist librarians from Developing Countries to attend IFLA (1974)
- Ontario Library Association Trustee Award (1977)
- Honorary Fellow, International Federation of Library Associations and Institutions (IFLA) (1979)
- Prithvi Nath Kaula Gold Medal and Citation (1984)

== Publications ==
- 1959. A bibliography of Canadiana : being items in the Public Library of Toronto, Canada, relating to the early history and development of Canada. Edited by Gertrude M. Boyle, assisted by Marjorie Colbeck; with an introduction by Henry C. Campbell.
- 1959. Toronto builds an extension [central reference library]. Library Journal 84, 1 Dec.: 3706-08.
- 1961. The immigrant and the public library [Toronto]. Library Journal 86, 1 June: 2057-59.
- 1961. Public libraries in metropolitan Toronto. Wilson Library Bulletin 35, Jan.: 359-64.
- 1961. Early Toronto newspapers, 1793-1867 : a catalogue of newspapers published in the town of York and the city of Toronto from the beginning to Confederation. Edited by Edith G. Firth; with an introduction by Henry C. Campbell.
- 1962. Toronto’s overseas interne scheme: 10 years after. Journal of Education for Librarianship 2, Winter: 158-61.
- 1963. New Canadians tune in to the public library. UNESCO Bulletin for Libraries 17, March–April: 63-4.
- 1964. Regional Plans for Documentation in Canada, Revue Internationale de la Documentation, 31:6-8.
- 1964. The nature and purpose of increased government assistance, federal, provincial and local. Canadian Library 20, Jan.: 186-89.
- 1964. Public libraries in Metropolitan Toronto—1957-1964. Ontario Library Review 48, 1: 64-9.
- 1966. A proposal for a bibliographic bank for the Province of Ontario. Library Resources and Technical Services 10, 4: 512-19.
- 1966. Some implications for libraries of communications satellites. UNESCO Bulletin for Libraries 20, May–June: 129-33,139.
- 1966. Books for boys and girls. Edited by Marguerite Bagshaw; assisted by Doris Scott; with an introduction by Henry C. Campbell, Toronto, Ryerson Press.
- 1967. Are libraries hot or cool? Wilson Library Bulletin 41, May: 911-12.
- 1968. The effect of metropolitanism on the public library. Library Quarterly 38, Jan.: 32-40.
- 1968. Bartlett's Canada; a pre-Confederation journey. Introduction by Henry C. Campbell, texts by Janice Tyrwhitt, Toronto, McClelland and Stewart.
- 1969. National planning for Canadian science and social science information systems. Library Trends 17, 3: 280-88.
- 1969. The Canadian library scene. International Library Review 1, April: 213-23. With Virginia F. Ludlow.
- 1969. Canadian libraries, London : Clive Bingley. Second edition in 1971 by Pendragon House, Toronto.
- 1971. Early Days on the Great Lakes / The Art of William Armstrong. McClelland & Stewart.
- 1971. Information for urban affairs in Canada. By Michel Barcelo, Henry C. Campbell and Dennis A. Young.
- 1973. A look ahead for the Toronto Public Library. IPLO Quarterly 14, Jan.: 104-07.
- 1973. Public libraries in the urban metropolitan setting : the management of change, studies in the evolution of library systems, London : Clive Bingley.
- 1973. Metropolitan public library systems in Canada. Pakistan Library Bulletin 6, 1-2: 1-28.
- 1975. Future Activity in Regional Organization of IFLA. IFLA Journal, 1975, Volume 1, Issue 4, pp. 287 – 291.
- 1975. Brief to the Minister of Culture and recreation on the present crisis in the large urban centre public libraries in Ontario by the Administrators of the Large Urban Centre Public Libraries in Ontario. Prepared by E. Stanley Beacock, Henry C. Campbell, and June E. Munro.
- 1980. The Future of Electronic Libraries and Electronic Publishing in Canada: A Position Paper for the Canadian Library Association. Ottawa: Canadian Library Association.
- 1980. Manual on Public Library Systems and Services.
- 1980. Computer Information Systems in the People’s Republic of China.
- 1983. Le Développement des systèmes et des services de bibliothèques publiques, Paris : UNESCO.
- 1984. Librarianship for Enduring Peace and Social Progress: Professor P N Kaula Endowment Lecture, Herald of Library Science, Volume 28, January–April 1989 (pp. 79–86).
- 2002. Library Universality in a Divided World, IFLA Journal 28 (2002) 3, pp. 118–135.
- 2002. IFLA's First Fifty Years: A reprise, by Joachim Wieder, Ed. by Harry Campbell, IFLA Journal 28 (2002) 3, pp. 107–117.
