= Coat of arms of Toronto =

Official coat of arms of the City of Toronto

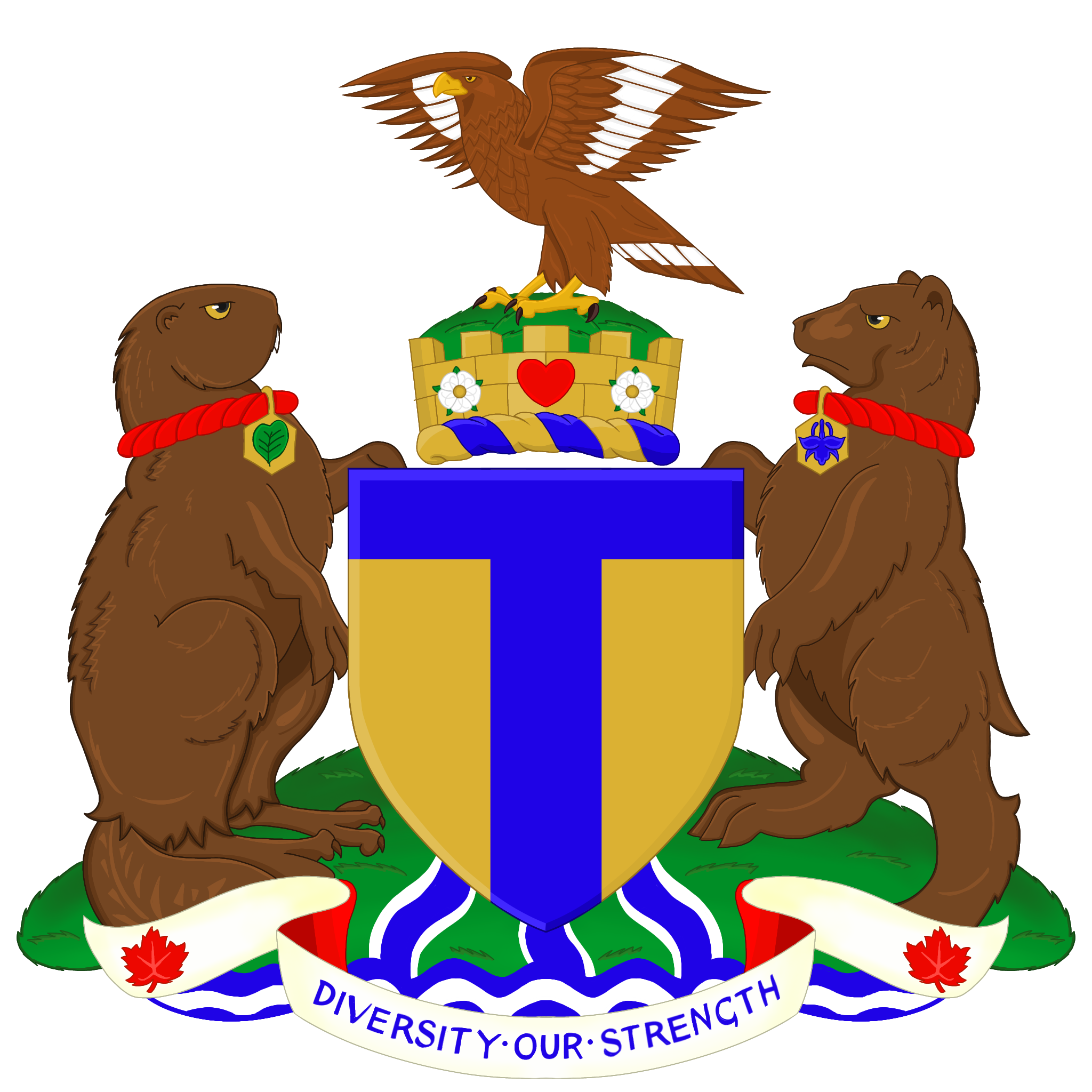
- Armiger: City of Toronto
- Crest: Issuant from a mural crown Or charged with a heart Gules between two roses Argent barbed Vert seeded Or, a mound Vert thereon a golden eagle wings raised proper.
- Shield: Or a chief-pale Azure.
- Supporters: On a mound Vert rising above barry wavy Azure and Argent and charged with three pales wavy Azure fimbriated Argent, dexter a beaver proper gorged with a cord Gules pendant therefrom a hexagon Or charged with an alder leaf Vert, sinister a bear proper gorged with a cord Gules pendant therefrom a hexagon Or charged with a columbine flower Azure.
- Motto: Diversity Our Strength.

The coat of arms of Toronto is the armorial bearing used to represent the city of Toronto in Ontario, Canada. It was designed by Robert Watt, the Chief Herald of Canada at the time, for the municipal government of Toronto (incorporated as the City of Toronto) after its amalgamation in 1998. The arms were granted by the Canadian Heraldic Authority on 11 January 1999.

== Description ==
The coat of arms can be described as follows: Or, a pale and a chief Azure. The crest: on a wreath of the colours, issuant from a mural coronet Or, masoned Sable charged with a human heart Gules between two roses Argent, buttoned Or, slipped proper, on a grassy mount Vert, a golden eagle statant, wings elevated and expanded proper. The supporters are: on the dexter, a beaver sejeant proper, collared with a torse Gules, therefrom on a hexagon Or an ash leaf Vert; on the sinister, a brown bear rampant proper, collared with a torse Gules, pendant therefrom a hexagon charged with a columbine flower proper. Both supporters are placed on a grassy mount from which at the base of the shield three wavy streams in pairle reversed Argent each surcharged with another Azure flow into a barry wavy 'lakefront', below which is placed a scroll with the motto Diversity Our Strength between two maple leaves Gules, veined Or, at the extremities of the scroll.

The Canadian Heraldic Authority's official blazon of the coat of arms is:

- Arms: Or a chief-pale Azure.
- Crest: Issuant from a mural crown Or charged with a heart Gules between two roses Argent barbed Vert seeded Or, a mound Vert thereon a golden eagle wings raised proper.
- Supporters: On a mound Vert rising above barry wavy Azure and Argent and charged with three pales wavy Azure fimbriated Argent, dexter a beaver proper gorged with a cord Gules pendant therefrom a hexagon Or charged with an alder leaf Vert, sinister a bear proper gorged with a cord Gules pendant therefrom a hexagon Or charged with a columbine flower Azure.
- Motto: Diversity Our Strength.

The arms displayed on the shield are designed in a way that represents the two towers of Toronto City Hall and the capital letter T, as shown in the image of the arms. The three wavy streams beneath the shield represent the three rivers of Toronto: the Humber, the Don and the Rouge. The barry wavy 'lakefront' represents Lake Ontario.

== Former coats of arms ==
The chain of office of the Mayor of Toronto includes the coats of arms or heraldic devices of all prior municipalities, including the Municipality of Metropolitan Toronto.

The coats of arms for the current City of Toronto government, the former City of Scarborough, and the former City of York are registered in the Canadian Heraldic Authority's Public Register of Arms, Flags and Badges of Canada. The former City of York was the only former municipality in Metropolitan Toronto to have a motto in Latin, while the mottoes of the other municipalities were in English.

=== Toronto ===
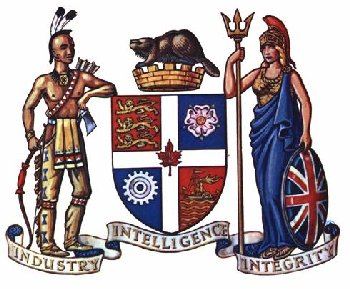
Arms of the former City of Toronto, designed by William Lyon Mackenzie.

The former City of Toronto had a coat of arms prior to amalgamation in 1998, designed by William Lyon Mackenzie. The shield consisted of four quarters separated by a white cross charged with a red maple leaf. The first quarter was red and charged with three golden lions as an allusion to the coat of arms of England, the second quarter was blue with a white stylized rose to allude to York, the third quarter was blue with a white cog wheel for industry, and the fourth quarter displayed a steam boat in gold on red to represent the importance of the lake and waterways in and around the city. The crest was a beaver atop a gold mural crown; the mural crown represents Fort York. The supporters were a First Nations warrior (likely representing the local Mississaugas) with a bow (on the viewer's left), and the personification of Britannia with trident and shield painted with the Union Jack (on the viewer's right). The motto was "Industry, Intelligence, Integrity".

In an earlier version of the arms, a beaver was shown in place of the white rose, and a sheaf of wheat instead of the cog wheel. In addition, the First Nations supporter in the earlier coat of arms was a Chief holding an axe, and both supporters were facing directly across to one another.

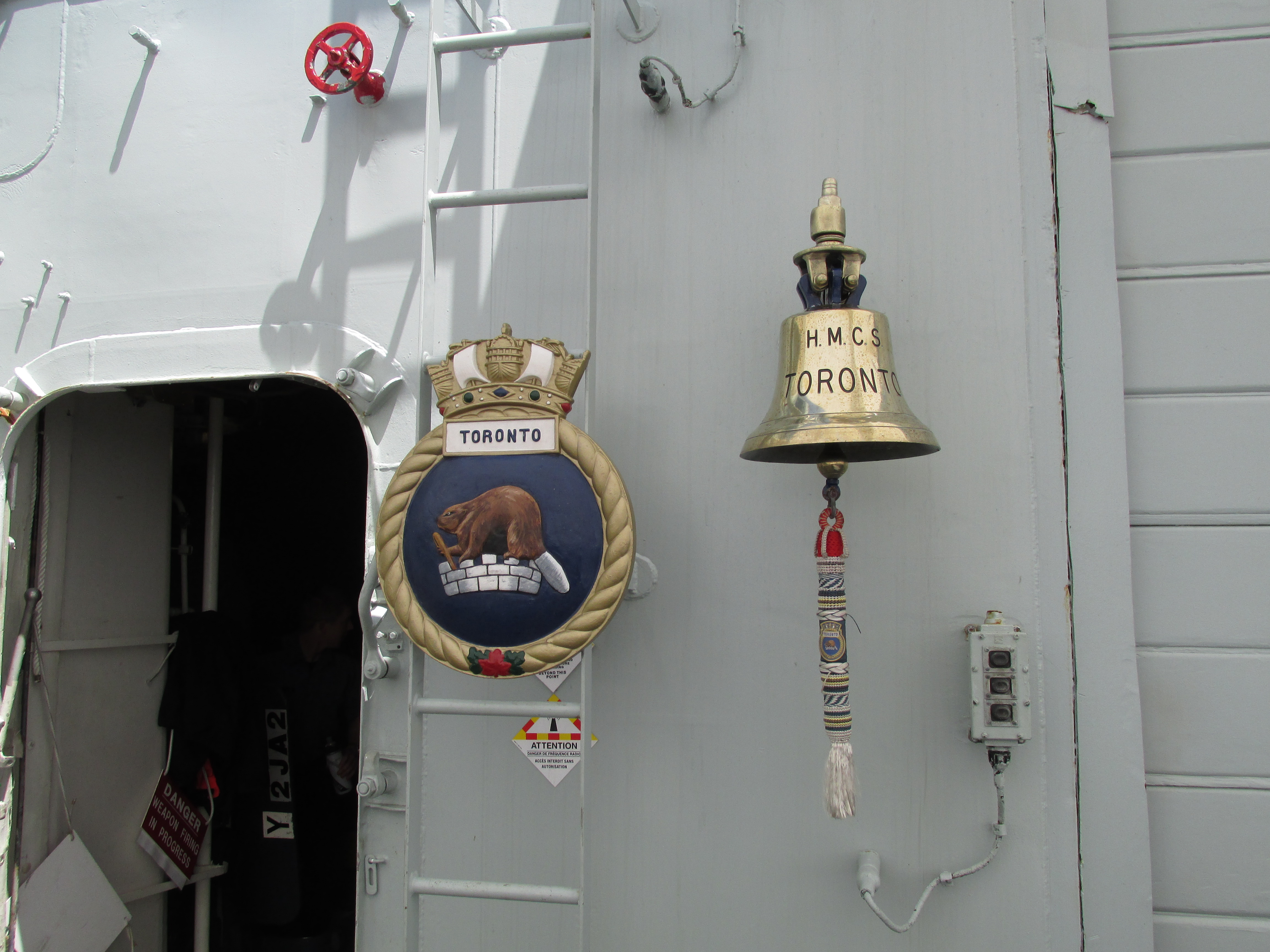
Heraldic badge of HMCS Toronto

The heraldic badge of HMCS Toronto features the crest of the former City of Toronto.

In 1997, the Canadian Heraldic Authority created a prototype for Amalgamated Toronto's new coat of arms. It consisted of a golden shield with 3 wavy shapes thereon, with a green disc consisting of a coronet that contained trilliums and a maple leaf; the 3 Golden and 3 Blue shapes represented the 6 municipalities (East York, Etobicoke, North York, Old Toronto, Scarborough, and York) brought together to form the new City of Toronto. The Trilliums upon the coronet represented Toronto's place in Ontario as the Provincial capital, and the Maple Leaf represented Toronto's place in Canada as Canada's largest city. The crest, almost identical to the former city crest, was a beaver atop a mural crown holding an ear of wheat. The supporters were hybrids between a Lion, an Ocelot, a Tiger, and a Dragon, as these were the 4 animals that the City of Toronto polled people on what animals they would like to see on the city arms. These hybrid supporters ultimately got the arms rejected by the Toronto City Council. The compartment, 3 wavy lines emptying into a watery base, is the same as the current compartment used by the City of Toronto, and represented the Humber, Don, and Rouge Rivers flowing into Lake Ontario. The motto, STRONGER IN UNITY, refers to the multicultural dimension of the city and to the six municipalities that formed what is now the City of Toronto.

=== East York ===
The Borough of East York's armorial device was designed by Harry Faulks, a resident of Leaside. It was selected by the Borough in 1967 and consisted of the following elements:

- Arms: Gules a rose Argent barbed Vert and seeded Or, in a chief of the second and between two maple leaves of the third a beaver proper.
- Crest: A bulldog statant proper.
- Motto: BOROUGH OF EAST YORK.

=== Etobicoke ===
The City of Etobicoke's coat of arms were granted by the Canadian Intellectual Property Office on 16 November 1977. The armorial bearings consisted of the following items:

- Arms: Or on a mount Vert a clump of four speckled alders proper.
- Crest: On a wreath of the colours Or and Vert, a Canadian Mural Crown, embattled of six maple leaves Or masoned and veined Sable.
- Supporters : On the dexter side a representation of a native Indian of the era, on bended knee holding in the dexter hand a bow all proper, and on the sinister side a figure on bended knee representing Etienne Brule, holding in the sinister hand a musket, all proper.
- On a compartment consisting of an escroll Argent the name ETOBICOKE, on the dexter side the word TRADITION, and on the sinister the word PROGRESS, all Sable.

=== North York ===
North York's civic shield

North York's seal was created by Toronto Architect Murray Brown (1885-1958) who was also commissioned in 1922–1923 to design the then-township's first municipal building. Township of North York Bylaw 103, passed 23 December 1923, defined the seal as "A Shield showing a sheaf of grain and scales, surmounted by a beaver on crown, and border of maple leaves on right and left hand sides, the whole surrounded with the words, "Progress With Economy".". The former municipality's armorial device consisted of:

- Arms: Per fess and per pale Gules, a beaver above a coronet, a sheaf of wheat and a scale, all Or.
- Badge: Three maple leaves on either side of the shield, all within a roundel
- Motto: PROGRESS WITH ECONOMY.

=== Scarborough ===
The City of Scarborough's coat of arms was granted in 1996 by the Canadian Heraldic Authority, and the official blazon of the arms was as follows:

- Arms: Or, a columbine flower and a chief embattled Azure, issuant from the upper chief a demi-sun Or.
- Crest: Issuant from a coronet heightened with four ears of corn (one and two-halves visible) alternating with four millstones (two visible) Or, a maple leaf Gules.
- Supporters: Two stags Or attired and unguled Azure, each gorged with a collar of braid Gules, Argent and Azure, standing upon a representation of the Scarborough Bluffs proper rising above the waters of Lake Ontario Azure and Argent.
- Motto: HOME ABOVE THE BLUFFS.

The previous armorial device of the former borough had a shield within a laurel wreath. Upon this shield were the following elements, in quarters:

- The arms of the province of Ontario
- A sheaf of wheat
- Two cog wheels and a factory
- A view of the Scarborough Bluffs

=== York ===
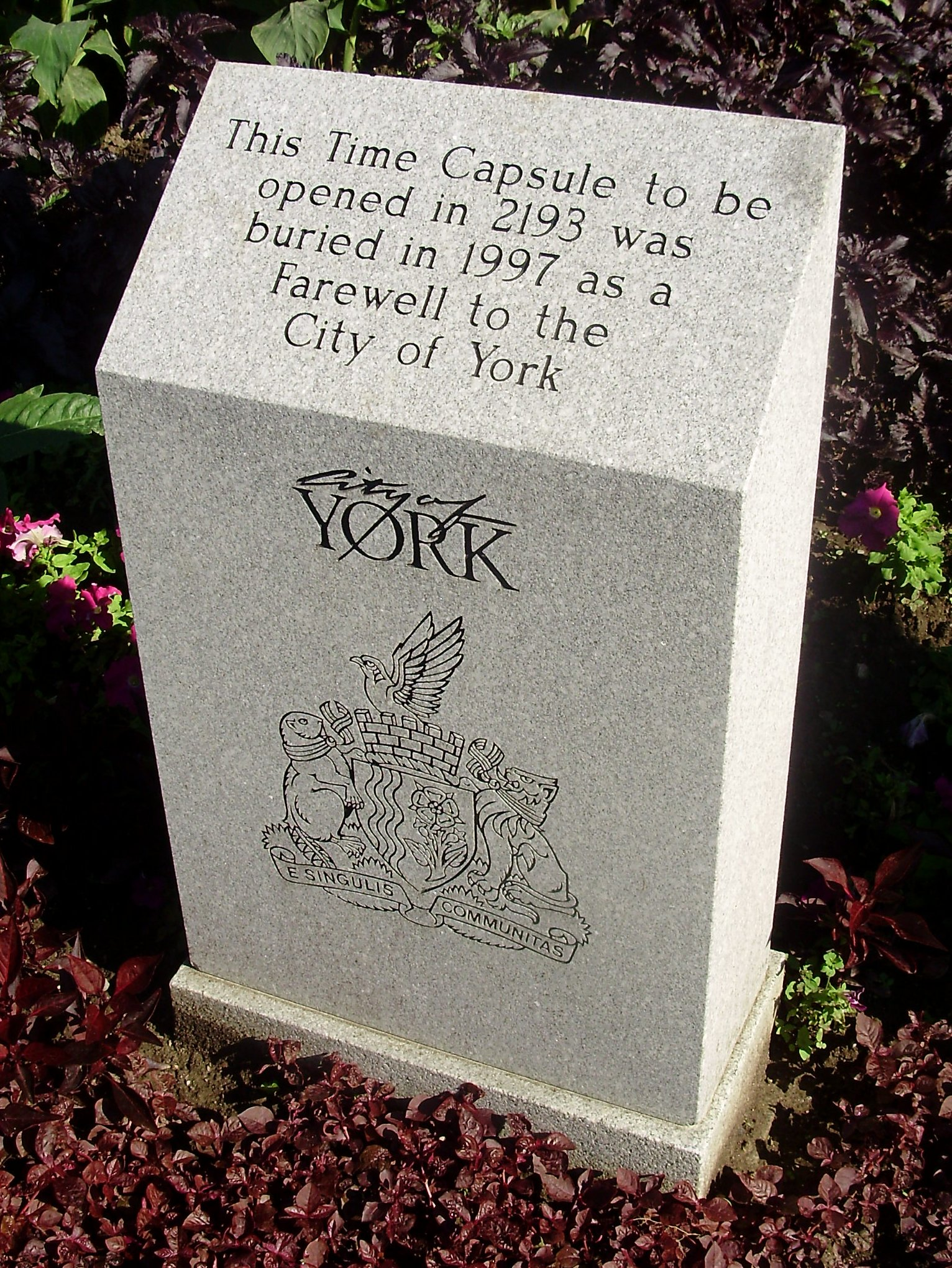
This time capsule outside the York Civic Centre is intended to be sealed for 196 years. It depicts the city of York's logo and coat of arms.

The City of York's coat of arms was granted in 1993 by the Canadian Heraldic Authority, and the official blazon of the arms was as follows:

- Arms: Vert, dexter a pale wavy Argent charged with a pallet wavy Azure, sinister a sprig of rose Or flowered Argent.
- Crest: A rock dove proper rising out of a Mural Crown Or masoned Azure.
- Supporters: On a grassy mound, dexter a beaver sejant erect Or gorged with a ribbon Vert, Argent and Azure, sinister a lion sejant the right forepaw raised Or gorged with a like ribbon.
- Motto: E SINGULIS COMMUNITAS (Latin for "From individuals, a community").
- Badge: A hexagon Vert charged with a sprig of rose Or flowered Argent.

The city's motto was in Latin, and it was the only former municipality with a motto in that language, while the others were in English.
