= Toronto Public Library =

Public library system in Toronto, Canada

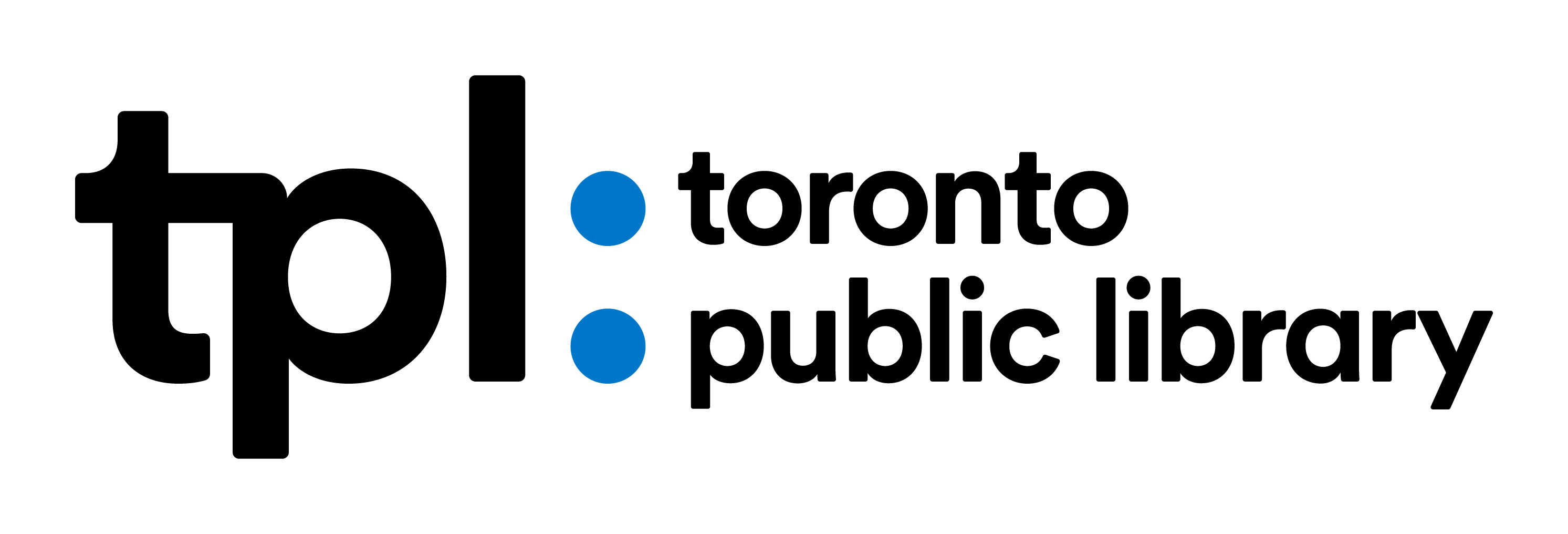
- Location: Toronto, Ontario, Canada
- Established: 1884
- Branches: 101

Collection
- Size: 10.6 million (2021)

Access and use
- Circulation: 26.6 million (2023)
- Population served: 3M (2024)
- Members: 2M

Other information
- Budget: $252M (2024)
- Director: Moe Hosseini-Ara (City Librarian)
- Employees: 2,000
- Parent organization: City of Toronto
- Website: www.tpl.ca

Toronto Public Library (TPL) is a public library system in Toronto, Ontario. It is the largest public library system in Canada, and in 2023 had averaged a higher circulation per capita than any other public library system internationally, making it the largest neighbourhood-based library system in the world. Within North America, it also had the highest circulation and visitors when compared to other large urban systems. Established as the library of the Mechanics' Institute in 1830, the Toronto Public Library now consists of 100 branch libraries and has over 26 million items in its collection.

== History ==
The first subscription library service to open in the city was on 9 December 1810, at Elmsley House. During the Burning of York in April 1813, several American officers under Commodore Issac Chauncey's command looted books from the library. Discovering his officers were in possession of the stolen books after they returned to Sackets Harbor, Chauncey ordered the looted books returned to York. The stolen books were returned in two crates, although by the time they arrived, the library had already closed. The books were auctioned off in 1822.

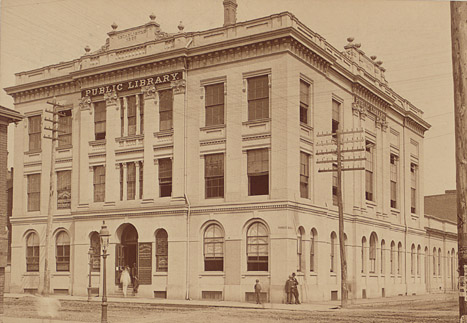
The Toronto Mechanics' Institute in 1884. A library was established at the Institute in 1830, whose collection was later absorbed into the Toronto Public Library in 1884.

In 1830, a library was established in the York Mechanics' Institute. In 1882, the provincial legislature, under Premier Oliver Mowat, passed The Free Libraries Act, 1882. A public campaign for a free library in Toronto preceded a referendum on the question, held on 1 January 1883, in which Torontonians voted in favour of creating a city library. Alderman John Hallam, whom historian Barbara Myrvold describes as having an "almost idolatrous regard for books", was a principal booster for the new library.

In 1884, the Mechanic's Institute's collection became the Toronto Public Library. James Bain was the first chief librarian and he supplemented the collection with $15,000 worth of books purchased on a trip to England in late 1883.

Between 1907 and 1916, ten libraries were built with funds from the Andrew Carnegie Trust. Several of these Carnegie libraries continue to be used by the public library; one, the original Central Reference Library, is now the Koffler Student Centre at the University of Toronto.

Henry Cummings Campbell was Chief Librarian of the Toronto Public Library from 1956 to 1978, and the first Chief Librarian to hold a professional library degree. He is credited with having contributed to the expansion of the library and its adaptation to an increasingly dynamic and multicultural city.

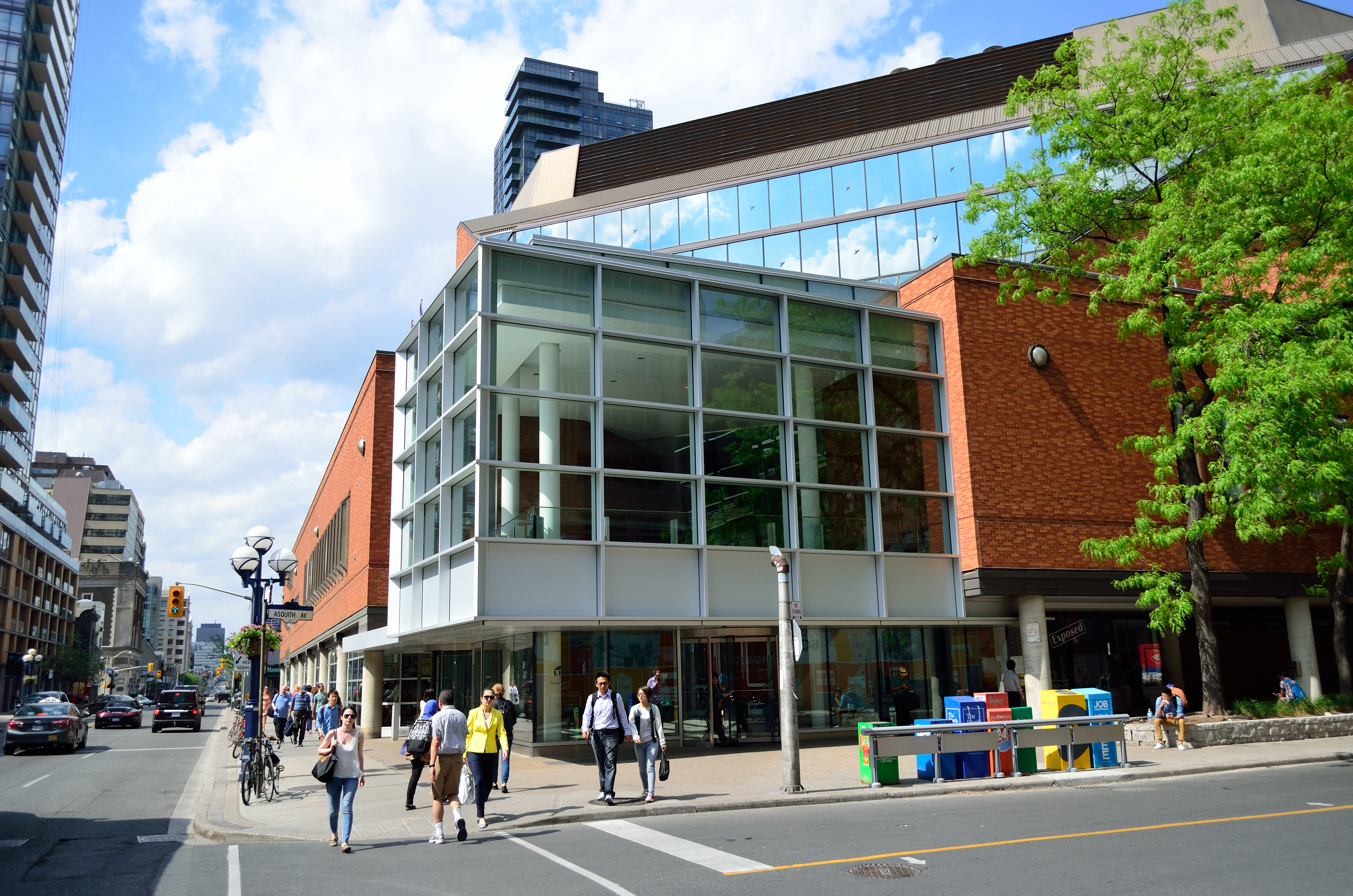
The Toronto Reference Library was merged with the other library boards of Toronto following Metropolitan Toronto's amalgamation in 1998.

During the amalgamation of Metropolitan Toronto in 1998, the individual library systems of all the Metro municipalities and of Metro itself were merged into the Toronto system:

- East York Public Library, established 1967, 5 branches
- Etobicoke Public Library, established 1950, 13 branches
- North York Public Library, established 1955, 19 branches
- Scarborough Public Library, established 1955, 19 branches
- York Public Library, established 1967, 6 branches
- Metropolitan Toronto Public Library, established 1967, 2 branches
- The old Toronto Public Library, established 1883, 33 branches

This made the Toronto Public Library the largest library system in North America, serving a population of 2.3 million people with 98 branches at the time.

In 2004, a new library was opened in the St. James Town neighbourhood of Toronto, bringing the total number of branches to 99. In 2014, the city's 100th library was constructed and opened in Scarborough City Centre.

The Toronto Public Library ended late fines on borrowed items in 2022, saying that late fines "aren't effective in encouraging the return of materials and represent a barrier to library use."

On 27 October 2023, a ransomware attack was detected which brought down various online services, including the TPL website. While the library remained open with wireless internet available, public computers and services on its website were offline. Confidential information of some staff members was exposed in the breach.

== Governance ==
The Toronto Public Library is governed by a board appointed by Toronto City Council. The board is composed of eight citizen members, four city councillors and the mayor or their designate.

== Services ==
=== Collections ===
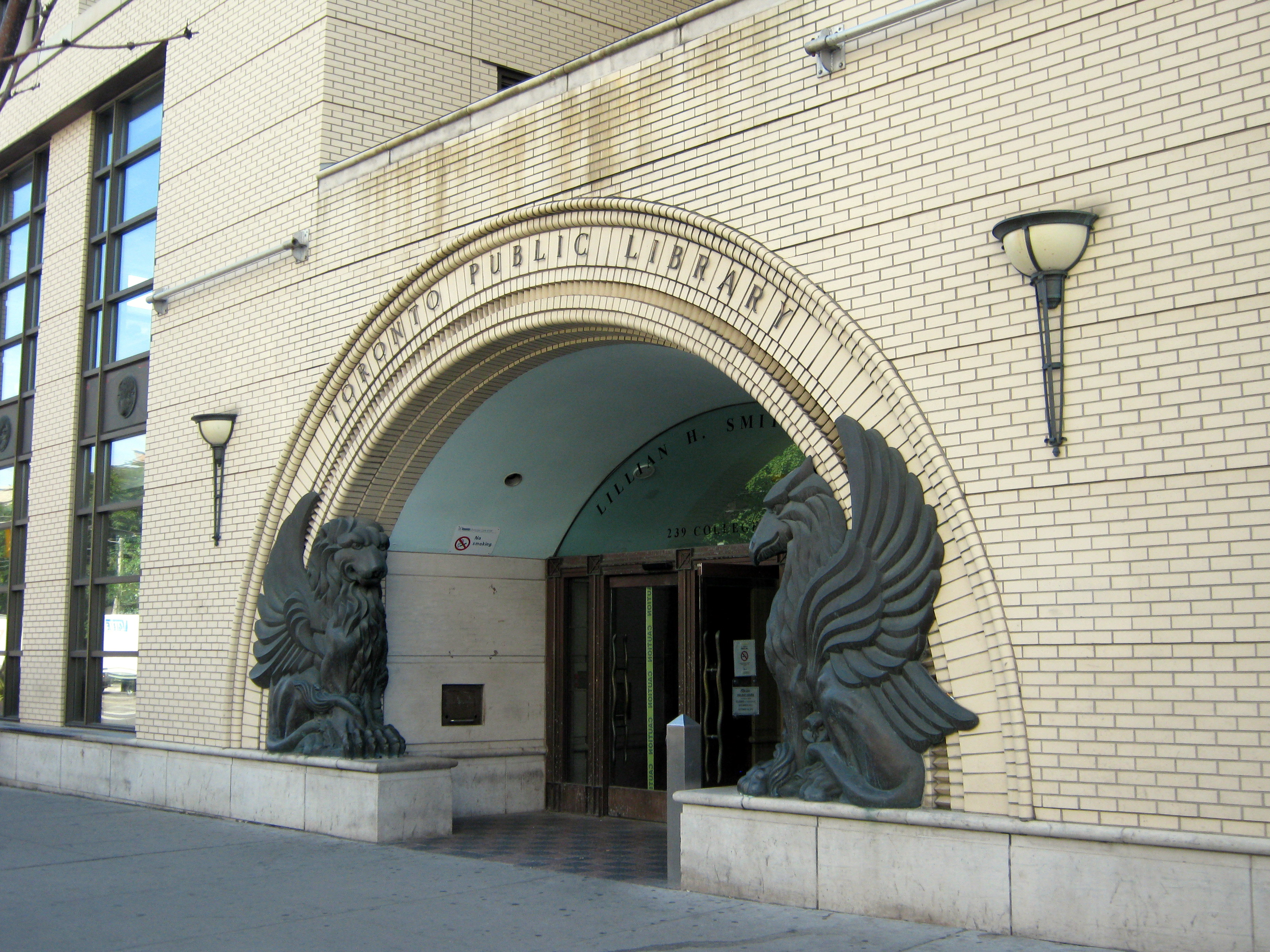
The Lillian H. Smith branch of TPL holds the Merril Collection of Science Fiction, and the Osborne Collection of Early Children's Books.

The library's collection count is over 12 million items.

==== Special collections ====
Toronto Public Library's special collections is located in several branches throughout the city. A number of special collections are housed at the Marilyn & Charles Baillie Special Collections Centre in the Toronto Reference Library. Special collections at the reference library includes the Arthur Conan Doyle Collection, and the Baldwin Collection of Canadiana.

Special collections located at other branches of the Toronto Public Library Merril Collection of Science Fiction, and the Osborne Collection of Early Children's Books, located at Lillian H. Smith branch. The Rita Cox Black and Caribbean Heritage Collection is spread throughout four branches of TPL, Malvern, Maria A. Shchuka, Parkdale, York Woods branch.

=== Bookmobiles ===
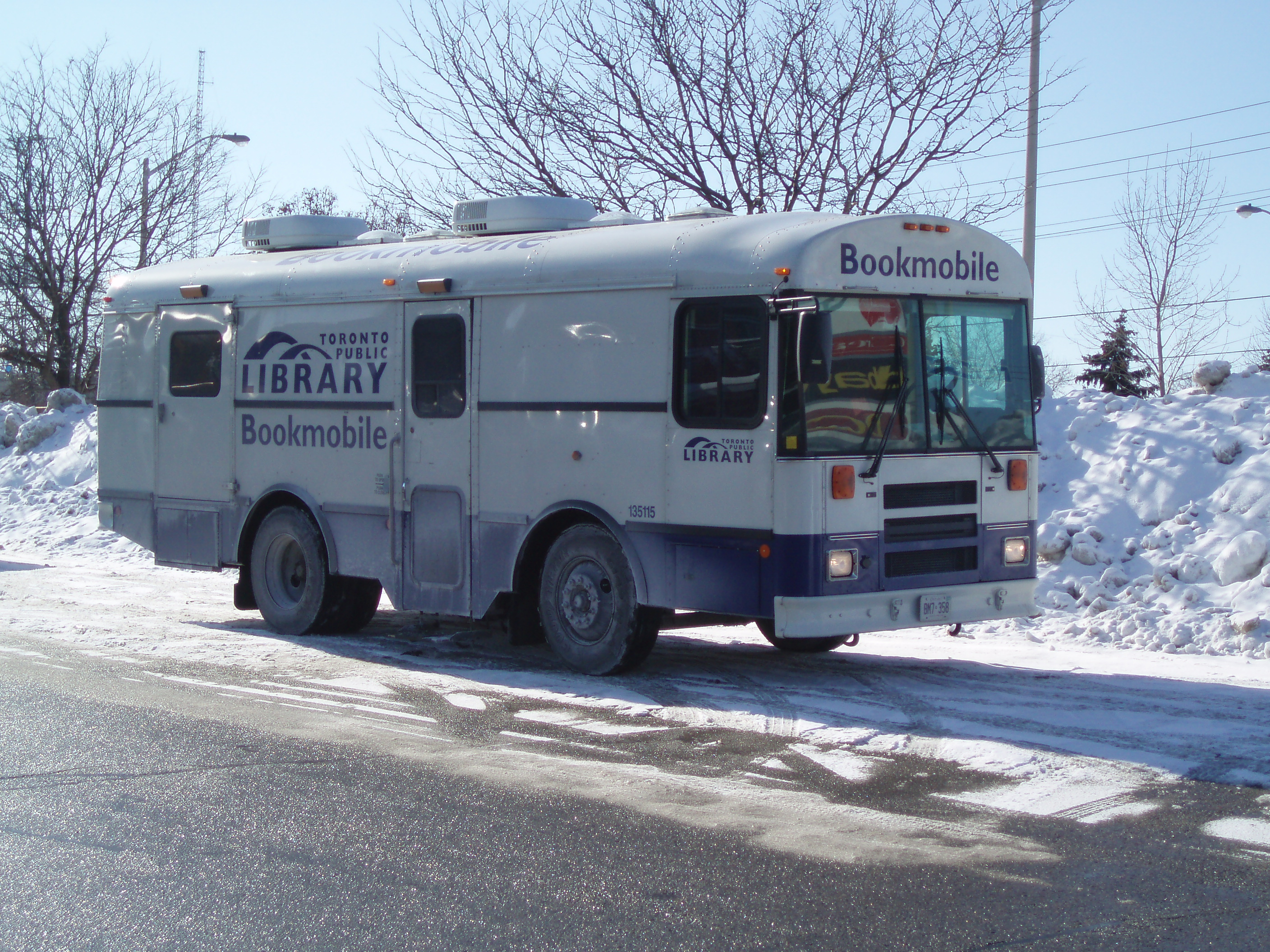
Toronto Public Library operates two bookmobiles.

The TPL operates two Bookmobile buses (24' Blue Bird CS), targeting communities who lack easy access to a neighbourhood branch. There are 32 regular Bookmobile stops in Toronto, including one on Ward's Island. The bookmobile concept was previously used in the library systems of the former municipalities of North York and Scarborough as well as in Toronto as far back as 1948.

=== Musical instruments ===
Since April 2016, the Parkdale, Downsview and York Woods branches have a collection of musical instruments including guitars, violins, keyboards, percussion instruments, and others that can be borrowed for free with a library card. Since then, the Musical Instrument Lending Libraries have expanded to the Downsview and York Woods branches.

=== tpl:map ===
Adult residents of Toronto can reserve a pass to a number of Toronto attractions with their library cards — one pass per attraction, per year to each participating destination. On the first Wednesday of each month, at 2:00 PM EST, a limited number of dates become available for the succeeding month (i.e. September passes become available in August), and eligible card holders make a reservation for a specific date. The number of visitors who can share a pass varies according to the attraction. Passes for popular sites, such as the Toronto Zoo, the ROM (Royal Ontario Museum) and the Ontario Science Centre, are often in very high demand.

=== Technology ===
The Toronto Public Library technology services include public access computers and free wireless internet access in all branches. The Library also provides access to e-books, music, movies, and other electronic collections. All libraries also include at least one multifunction device capable of printing, scanning or photocopying. Scanning services to email are provided at no cost. The Toronto Public Library website allows users to reserve materials and have them transferred to a patron's selected branch. The library also operates a 24/7 Dial-a-Story telephone hotline, which reads stories to children in sixteen languages.

The library system uses NFC/RFID pads on each item, where users only need to place the item on a reader pad, allowing them to be checked out without scanning a barcode.

Thirteen branches of the Toronto Public Library also house Digital Innovation Hubs, where patrons can reserve a workstation or equipment and attend workshops to bring new and emerging technology to the community.

In 2018, the Fabrication Studio opened at the newly renovated North York Central branch. This space includes sewing machines, a serger, an embroidery machine, a button maker, and a vinyl printer/cutter. They also offer free classes on using the equipment and other fabrication-related topics like knitting and crochet, embroidery, and watercolour painting.

==== Digital content ====
Toronto Public Library cardholders can digitally borrow books, music and movies since 2014 by creating an account on the online platform Hoopla. Also, since 2018, the Toronto Public Library has partnered with Kanopy, a streaming platform with over 30,000 films and documentaries, that lets the library users stream up to eight items per month after registering using their library card.

The library's digital archive provides instant access to historical images—including photographs from the Toronto Star Photograph Archive—postcards, maps, rare digitized books and more.

The Toronto Public Library offers audiobook, e-book, and eMagazine services, including OverDrive eBooks & eAudiobooks, Zinio eMagazines, OneClick Digital eAudiobooks, O'Reilly Online, TumbleBook Library, Ebsco eBooks, delivered via the library's website.

=== Theatres ===
3 branches of the library system offer performance theatres available for both non-profit community and commercial usage.

Location	Seating Capacity
Fairview	260
Palmerston	110
York Woods	235

== Budget ==
The Toronto Public Library had a net operating budget of $274,378,000 in 2026.

Toronto Public Library's operating revenues are almost entirely in the form of grants from its parent agency, the City of Toronto originating from municipal property taxes. Smaller, less significant sources of revenue include minor grants from the Government of Ontario, revenue from venue rentals and transfers from Toronto Public Library Foundation.

Prior to June 2022, Toronto Public Library derived approximately 2% of its revenues from fines and user fees. In the interest of reducing barriers to library access, the library ceased charging fines for overdue items and this revenue stream was replaced by both increases in municipal funding and grants from the Foundation. The library has indicated that, despite the loss of revenue and a general increase in late item returns, the financial impact remains within the budget and has increased card registrations customer retention.

== Branches ==
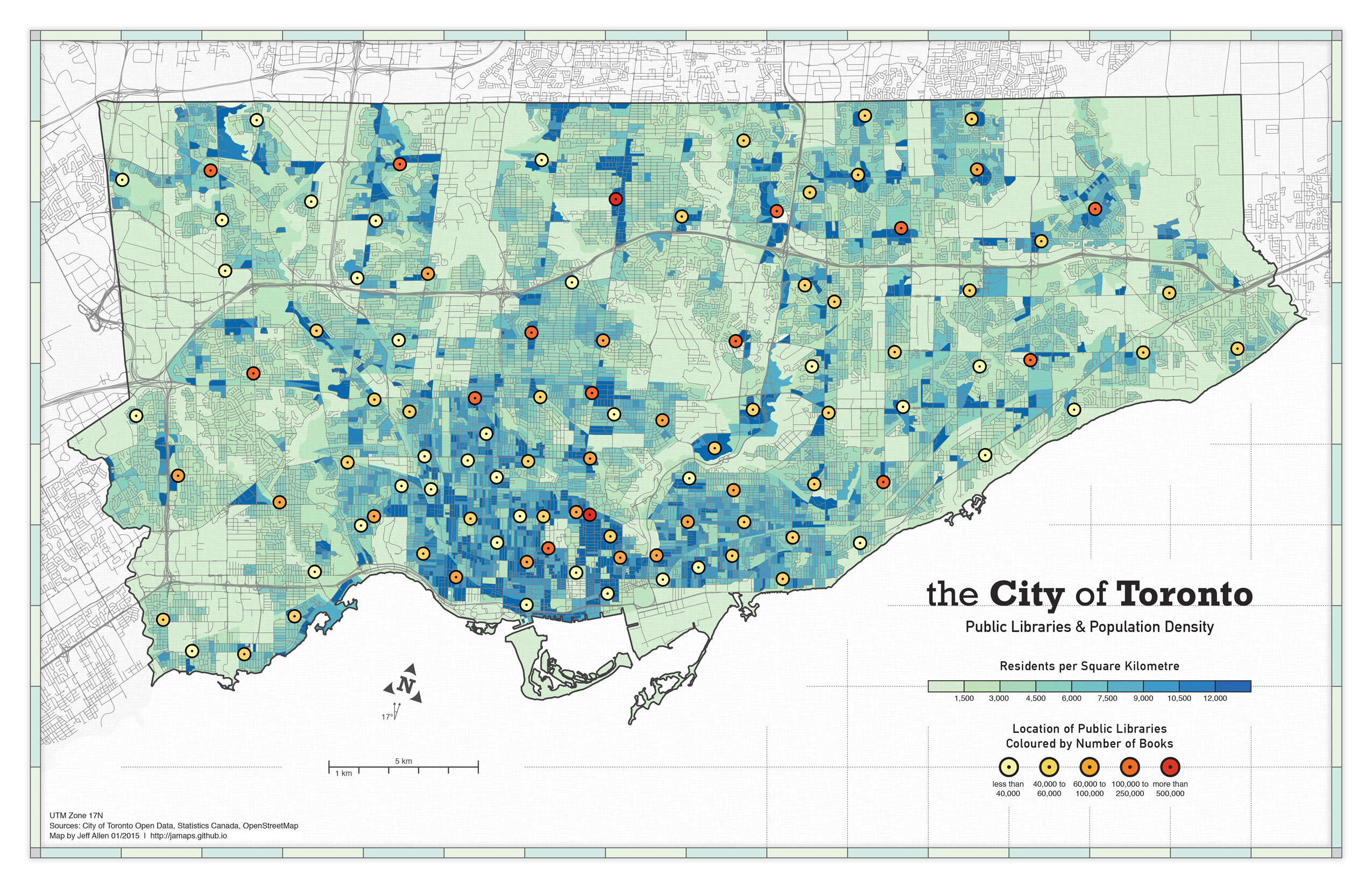
Map of public libraries in Toronto in relation to population density (2015)

Toronto Public Library has 100 library branches spread across Toronto, making it the largest neighbourhood-based public library system in the world.

Library branches, their programs, materials and services are often tailored to the demographics of the neighbourhood in which the branch is located. For example, materials in languages that are widely spoken in the neighbourhood are almost always available at a local library branch, and seasonal book displays and artwork may reflect the cultures of the local neighbourhood.

Toronto Public Library branches also have a range of trained staff; from librarians, to specialists in specific areas, clerical workers, and social workers. This makes TPL branches often one of the first lines of support for city residents searching for and accessing social services. Services such as "Book a Librarian", wherein members of the public may book one-on-one time with a librarian to assist with research, services and limited tech support are quite popular.

Toronto Public Library branches, in addition to community centres and some schools, operate as cooling centres as a part of the City of Toronto's heat relief network during extreme heat events.

Several branches of the Toronto Public Library feature public art installations. In 1925, Toronto-based artist George Agnew Reid painted a mural in the Earlscourt Library (now the Dufferin/St. Clair branch). The mural, on all four upper walls of the general reading room, depicts community life. It was covered in the 1960s, but has since been restored and is now fully visible.

== See also ==
- Children's Books History Society
- List of Carnegie libraries in Canada
- List of public libraries in Ontario

== Sources ==
- Bruce, Lorne (9 January 1994). Free Books for All: The Public Library Movement in Ontario, 1850–1930. Dundurn. ISBN 978-1459721074.
- Myrvold, Barbara (1986). "The First Hundred Years: Toronto Public Library, 1883–1983". In McNally, Peter F. (ed.). Readings in Canadian Library History. Ottawa: Canadian Library Association. pp. 65–89. ISBN 978-0-88802-196-0.
