= Toronto Mechanics' Institute =

Toronto's first public library, established in 1830

Coordinates: 43.6515°N 79.3746°W

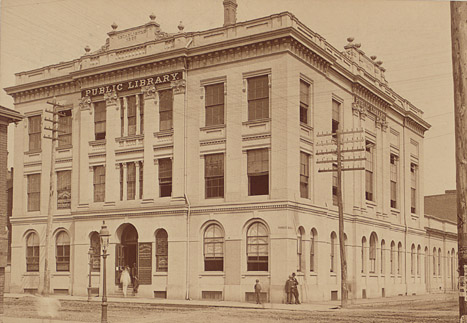
The first home of the Toronto Public Library

The Toronto Mechanics' Institute, originally named the York Mechanics' Institute, was an educational institution in 19th century Toronto that became the city's first public library. It was one of a series of mechanics' institutes that were set up around the world after becoming popular in Britain. Established in 1830, it was designed to provide technical and adult education.

Paying members had access to lectures, courses, and a library. In 1853 the Institute erected a new permanent home at the corner of Church and Adelaide Streets, but it struggled to attract new paying members. In 1883 the Institute was thus transformed into a municipally-supported public reference library. The idea was promoted by alderman John Hallam, but it met considerable resistance in city council. No other city in Canada at this time had a completely free public library. Hallam brought the initiative to a public referendum, and the citizens of Toronto voted in its favour on January 1, 1883. The 5,000 book collection of the Mechanics' Institute became the first books of the Toronto Public Library and James Bain was selected as the first chief librarian. As chief librarian, he focused on building the library's special collection documenting Canadian history. He also applied to Andrew Carnegie for a grant to build more branches and to replace the Mechanics' Institute as the central reference library.

The building remained the main branch of the Toronto Public Library until 1909 when the Carnegie grant allowed the library to open its new location at College and St. George (today the Koffler Centre). It remained a library branch until 1927, and was torn down in 1949. Today a condominium complex (84 Adelaide Street East) stands on the site, although it is marked with a heritage plaque.
