= Lillian H. Smith =

Canadian children's librarian (1887–1983)

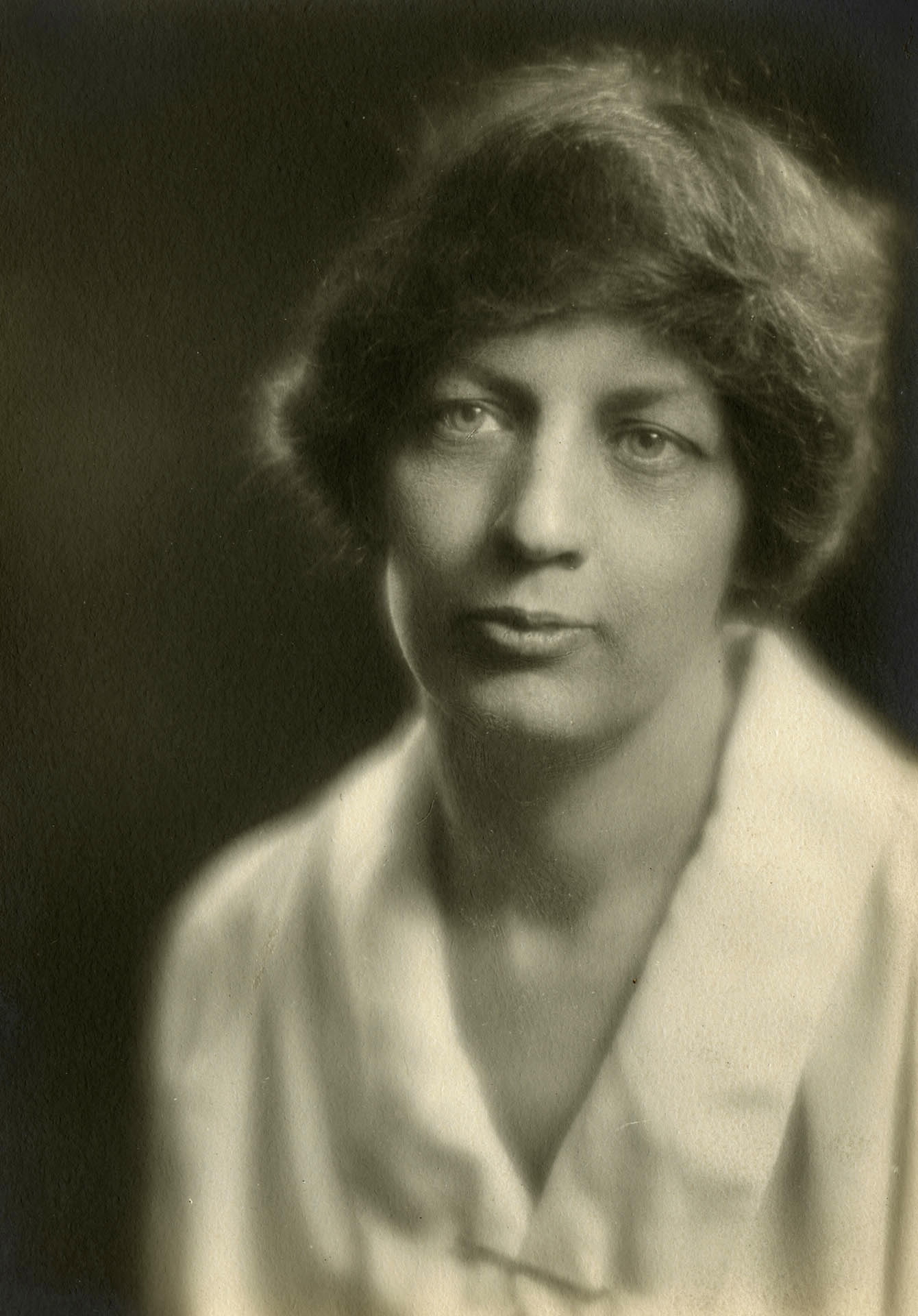
- Born: Lillian Helena Smith; March 17, 1887; London, Ontario
- Died: January 5, 1983 (aged 95); Toronto, Ontario
- Citizenship: Canadian
- Education: University of Toronto
- Occupation: Librarian
- Employer: Toronto Public Library

Lillian Helena Smith (17 March 1887 — 5 January 1983) was the first children's librarian in the British Empire. Over the course of her career, Smith established library spaces and services for children within the Toronto Public Library, Toronto schools, and at the Hospital for Sick Children. She also helped to create a library classification system that was used for children’s collections at Toronto libraries until the late 1990s. The Lillian H. Smith Toronto Public Library branch, opened in 1995, is named after her.

== Early life and education ==
On 17 March 1887, Smith was born in London, Ontario. Her mother was an organist and a pianist, and her father was a Methodist minister. From a young age, she took great interest in books and reading.

She attended Victoria University in the University of Toronto for her post-secondary education, before completing additional training at the Training School for Children's Librarians at the Carnegie Library of Pittsburgh.

== Career ==
Smith's library career began in 1911, at the New York Public Library, where she trained under librarian Anne Carroll Moore and was responsible for the children’s room at the Washington Heights Branch.

=== Toronto Public Library ===
In 1912, Smith was invited by George Locke, then Chief Librarian of the Toronto Public Library, to head the library's Children’s Services department. In the early days of her work, Smith expanded and refined the children's book collection at the Central Library. She visited schools to read to classes and promote the library. She also promoted the importance of children's literacy through community meetings and book displays. She organized and supervised training and professional development for other children's librarians throughout the library system. By 1952, under Smith's leadership, children's library services had expanded to include 16 branches with designated children's rooms, and libraries for children within 30 elementary schools and at The Hospital for Sick Children.

==== Boys and Girls House ====
Beginning in 1912, the “Story Hours” held in children’s rooms at various branches became very popular with patrons and by 1921, overcrowding in these rooms was a significant issue. As a result, in 1922, the library purchased the property at 40 St. George St, adjacent to the Reference Library, remodeling the home there into a separate children's library called the “Boys and Girls House”.

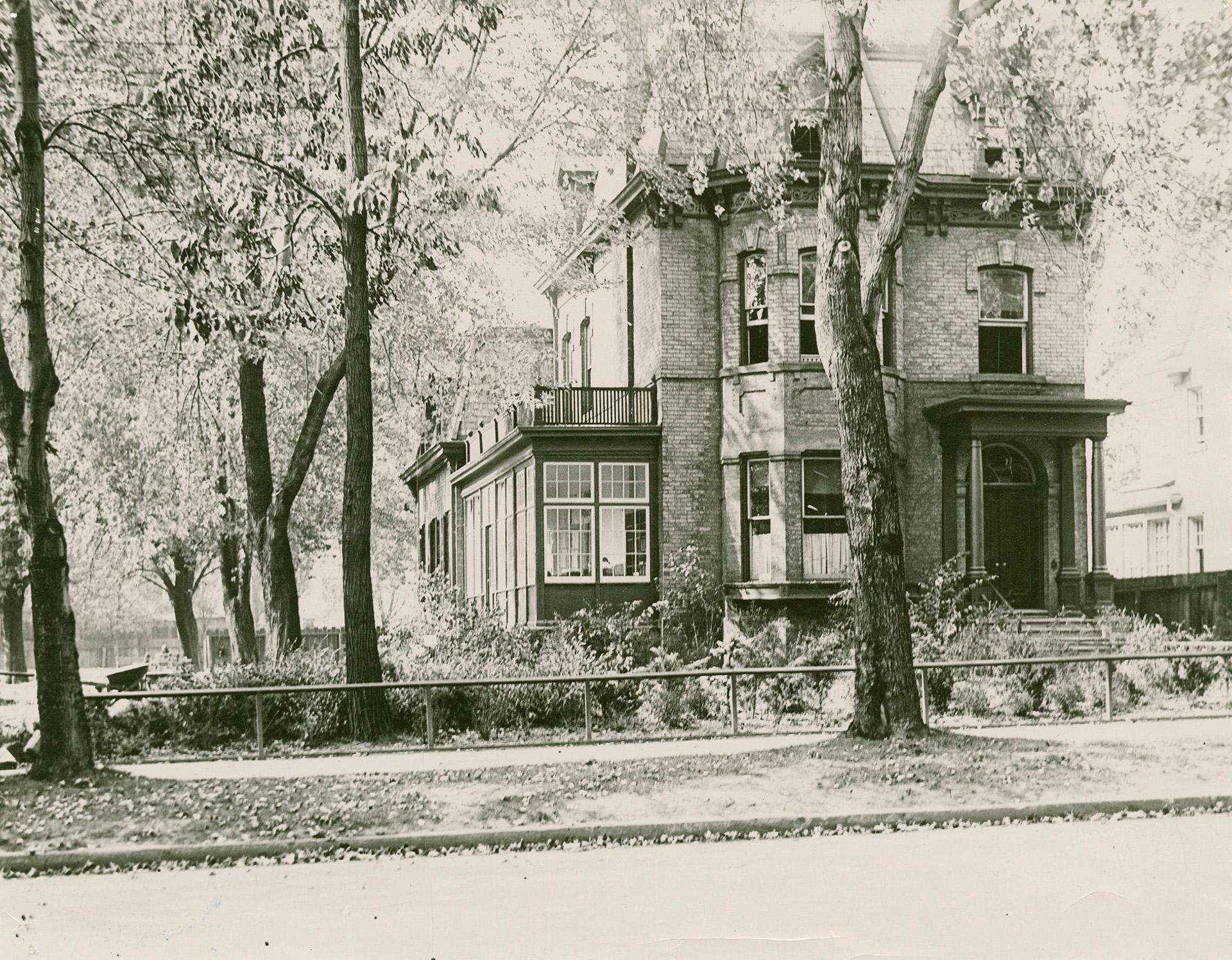
The first Boys and Girls House, 40 St. George St.

The new facility contained loanable materials, reading rooms, rooms for storytimes, club rooms, special childrens' collections, and a high school reference collection. In 1928, an addition to the building was constructed to add a theatre and a designated Story Hour Room.

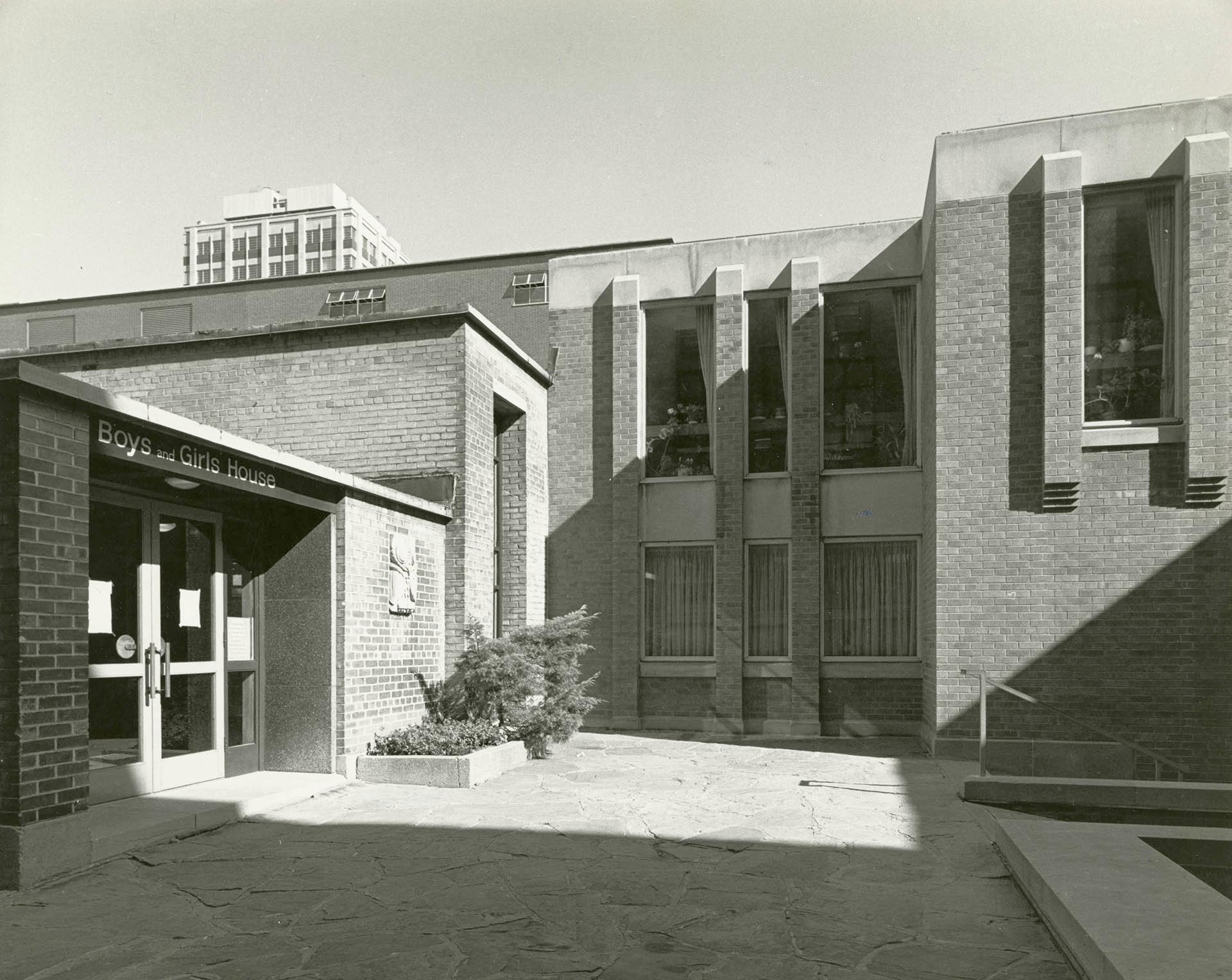
The new Boys and Girls House building, opened in 1964

By 1962, the house was in disrepair and considered unsafe for further use, so plans were made to replace the library building. In August of that year, the house was demolished and construction on the new building began in September. The new facility opened on May 7th, 1964.

=== Classification system ===
In the summer of 1930, the arrangement of books in the Toronto children's library collections was changed from the Dewey Decimal system to a system derived in-house based on the interests and needs of children users. Smith and her colleagues had observed that children had difficulty using the Dewey system.

The new system, which became known as the Lillian H. Smith Classification, was based on the alphabet, rather than on numbers, and divided books into intellectual levels: X-Z for pre-school level, A-V for junior and senior school levels, and W for senior school level. Because of the simplicity of this new system, the card catalogue for navigating the shelves was replaced with a simple shelf list.

The system consisted of the following categories:

Letter	Topic
X	Picture Books
Z	Little Children's Books
A	Fairy Tales
B	Legends
C	Myths
D	Epic Heroes
E	Exploration
F	Famous People
G	History
H	Geography and Description
K	Natural History
L	Science
N	Practical Science
O	Things to Do
P	Art
Q	Music
R	Plays
S	Poetry
T	The Bible
W	Standard Fiction

This system was retained by children’s services at the Toronto Public Library until the 1990s, at which point the library reverted to the Dewey Decimal system, although the use of X and Z for children’s picture books was maintained.

== Later years ==
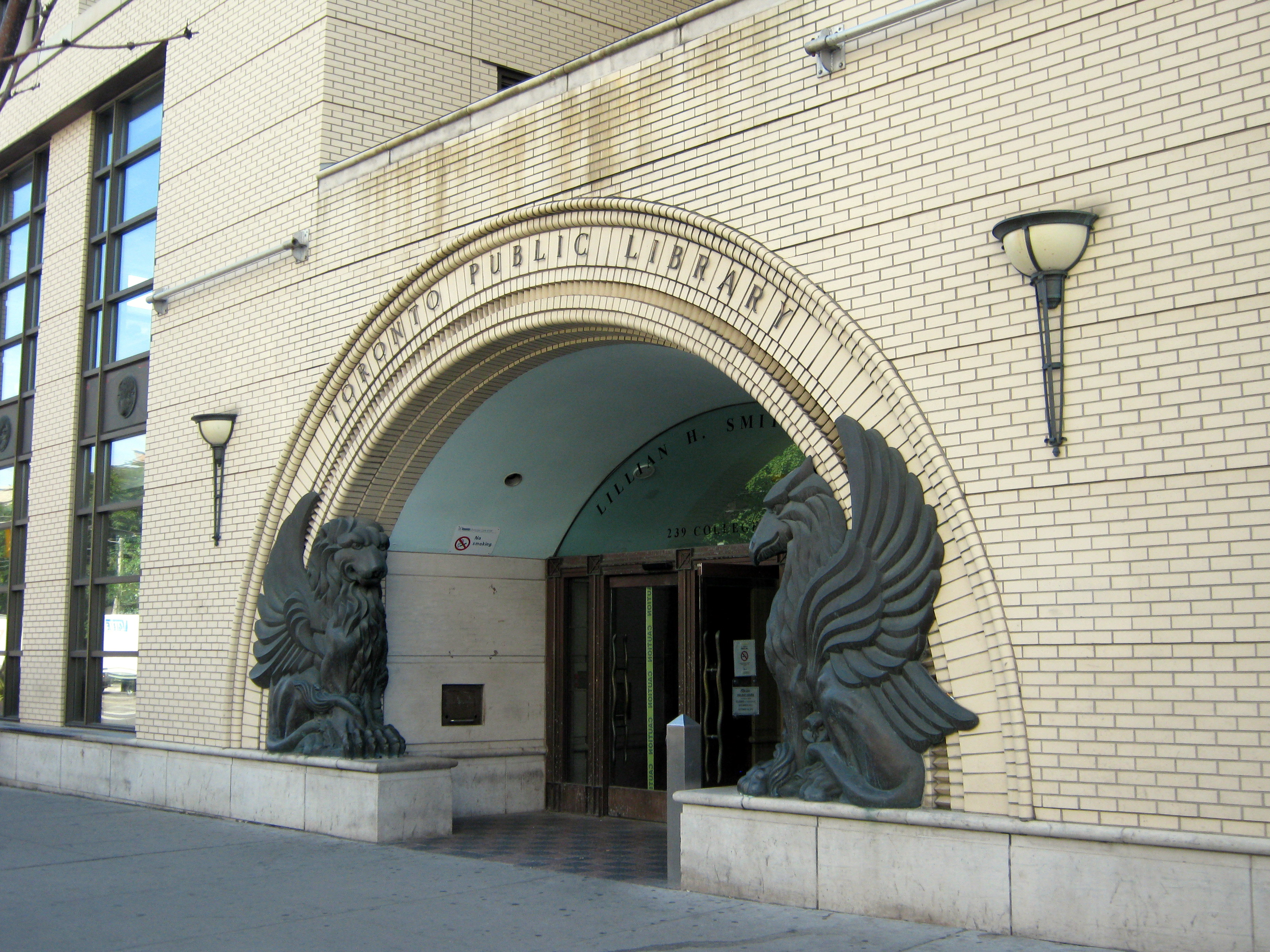
Toronto Public Library's Lillian H. Smith Branch

Smith retired in 1952. By the end of her career, Smith had opened up numerous children's spaces in Toronto libraries and schools and one at The Hospital for Sick Children.

In addition to her librarian career, Smith was a teacher and a writer. She created guidelines on the inclusion of children's literature in Toronto libraries. In 1953, she published The Unreluctant Years: A Critical Approach to Children's Literature, which was commissioned by the American Library Association.

On 5 January 1983, Smith died in Toronto, Ontario.

== Awards and honours ==
In 1962, Smith received the American Library Association's Clarence Day award.

In 1995, Boys and Girls House moved to a new location at 239 College Street and was renamed the Lillian H. Smith branch in her honour. It is no longer exclusively a children's library, but a general Toronto library branch.
