= Norman C. Goodhead =

Canadian politician

Norman Goodhead

9th Reeve of North York
- In office 1 January 1959 – 31 December 1964
- Preceded by: Vernon Singer
- Succeeded by: James Service

Personal details
- Born: August 26, 1917 Toronto, Ontario
- Died: October 3, 2009 (aged 92)
- Spouse: Eula
- Children: 4
- Occupation: Businessman

Norman Goodhead (August 26, 1917 — October 3, 2009) was Reeve of the Township of North York, Ontario from 1959 to 1964 and was twice a leading candidate to be Chairman of Metropolitan Toronto.

== Early life ==
Goodhead was born in the neighbourhood of Cabbagetown in Toronto, which was at the time considered a slum.

== Reeve ==
He was first elected to North York town council in 1956. Elected reeve in the December 1958 municipal election, he was a pro-development politician who led the municipality at a time when its population and infrastructure were booming. In the election, he campaigned for the creation of a Board of Control and for increased representation of North York on Metro Toronto Council, as the township had grown to a population of over 200,000.

As reeve, Goodhead opposed illegal basement apartments and other attempts by homeowners to subdivide and rent out houses to multiple tenants. His efforts led to the eviction of 50 families in one month of 1959, declaring he was prepared to evict 1,000 more. His actions were criticised by Reeve Albert Campbell of Scarborough, who said "imagine talking about sending township officials into private homes and padlocking them, then ordering workment to ripo out plumbing and the like."

He criticised the construction of the Gardiner Expressway, declaring that "the Gardiner Expressway will someday be a monument to stupidity."

== First Metro Chairman candidacy ==
Goodhead stood for the position of Metro Chairman in 1962, losing to Toronto Controller William R. Allen, who won 14 votes to Goodhead's 10; the position of Metro Chairman was elected by members of Metropolitan Toronto Council.

== Defeat as Reeve ==
He was defeated in his attempt to win a fourth term as reeve by James Service in the 1964 municipal election. Service, who was campaigning as a reformer, unseated Goodhead after unsuccessfully running against him in 1962 on the issue of amalgamating North York and the other Metro municipalities into a single City of Toronto, which Goodhead opposed. By the 1964 election, Goodhead was accused of engaging in "domineering tactics", "irrationality" and an "authoritarian approach" to issues by the Globe and Mail. The campaign also saw Service accuse Goodhead of being in a financial conflict of interest between his role as reeve and his role as an official in a garbage disposal company. Goodhead denied the charge.

== Business career ==
After leaving politics, he became a millionaire as president of Disposal Services Ltd., which was purchased from him by a US firm, Waste Management Inc, in 1972 for $12.5 million, and. He was also president of Superior Sand and Gravel, which owned two landfill sites, one in Scarborough and the other in Maple, Ontario The Maple landfill was the largest in Canada.

== Second campaign for Metro Chairman ==
Goodhead came out of retirement to run for Metro Chairman again in 1969, after Allen retired. Though he led on the first ballot, he was defeated on the third ballot by Scarborough Mayor Albert Campbell by 21 votes to 11. His protégé, Paul Godfrey, would be elected Metro Chairman in 1975.

== Legacy ==
Following Goodhead's death, Godfrey, whose mother had managed Goodhead's campaigns, called him "one of the original people that got North York out of the short-pants era to becoming a full-fledged municipality," and "a political dynamo" who would often clash with then-Metro Chairman Fred Gardiner.
