= City of Toronto Act =

Series of government acts governing Toronto, Canada

The City of Toronto Act is a city charter–type statute which governs the organization and political powers of Toronto. There have been other acts governing the city passed by the Legislative Assembly of Ontario since Toronto's original incorporation as a city in 1834, although they have since been consolidated and repealed as the city matured over time.

As of 2025, Toronto's governing document is the City of Toronto Act, 2006.

== 1834 incorporation ==
On March 6, 1834, the provincial legislature passed an act (Note: The full title of the act is An act to extend the limits of the Town of York, to erect the said Town into a City, and to incorporate it under the name of the City of Toronto. No short title was provided.) which created the City of Toronto from the unincorporated town of York. The act severed Toronto from York County. This allowed for the creation of the local government or city council. The act was transferred to the succeeding governments of Canada West in 1840 and Ontario in 1867. The incorporation remained in effect throughout Toronto's mergers with other cities and towns of York County until the creation of Metropolitan Toronto in 1954.

== The Municipality of Metropolitan Toronto Act, 1953 ==
The Municipality of Metropolitan Toronto Act, 1953 (Note: The "The" in the short title was part of the short title itself, which was a standard practice with Ontario statutes until 1981. The full title of the act is An Act to provide for the Federation of the Municipalities in the Toronto Metropolitan Area for Certain Financial and Other Purposes.) was a provincial act passed on April 2, 1953, to coordinate the services in the various municipalities of southern York County. The southern municipalities – East York, Etobicoke, Forest Hill, Leaside, Long Branch, Mimico, New Toronto, North York, Scarborough, Swansea, Toronto, Weston, and York – were separated from York County and organized under a new regional federation, named the Municipality of Metropolitan Toronto (commonly known as "Metro Toronto").

The act went into effect on April 15, 1953, and the Metro Toronto council met thereafter. The federation's taxation and legislative powers took effect on January 1, 1954. The federation was governed by a council made up of representatives of the member municipalities and a chairman to oversee the council. The first chairman was Fred Gardiner, appointed by the Ontario provincial government. Subsequent chairmen were selected by the council itself and later directly elected.

On January 1, 1967, seven of the thirteen municipalities were absorbed into the remaining six federation members: Toronto, Etobicoke, North York, East York, York, and Scarborough. The Metropolitan Toronto Act was revised in 1990 and finally repealed in 1997 with the amalgamation of the Metro Toronto government and the governments of the municipalities within.

== City of Toronto Act, 1997 (Bill 103) ==
In 1997, the Legislative Assembly of Ontario enacted a law to amalgamate the Metro Toronto government and the six municipalities within the Metro Toronto boundaries into an enlarged City of Toronto. A referendum in the six constituent municipalities showed residents opposed the merger by a ratio of more than three to one. However, municipal governments in Canada are subject to their respective provincial governments; thus, the Progressive Conservative government was able to move forward with the merger despite the referendum, which they did. The act took effect on January 1, 1998.

== Stronger City of Toronto for a Stronger Ontario Act, 2006 (Bill 53) ==
On December 14, 2005, the first reading of Bill 53 was given in the Legislative Assembly of Ontario. Also known as the Stronger City of Toronto for a Stronger Ontario Act, 2006, it enacted the new City of Toronto Act, 2006, as well as amended and repealed various public acts related to Toronto, and repealed various private acts also related to the city. The bill received its second reading on April 10, 2006, and was referred to the Standing Committee on General Government, which returned it to the legislature on May 30, 2006. On June 12, 2006, the bill received its third reading and royal assent after a 58–20 vote.

=== City of Toronto Act, 2006 (Schedule A) ===
The City of Toronto Act, 2006 (French: Loi de 2006 sur la cité de Toronto) functions as a consolidated city charter and grants unique powers to the municipal government of Toronto. Namely, this law permitted the Toronto government to enter into agreements with other governments and increased the scope for the city government to raise revenue. Tax powers in Canada are defined by the constitution and restrict certain powers of direct taxation only to the federal government.

Unlike all other municipalities in Ontario, Toronto's municipal structure derives almost entirely from its own statute and is generally not affected by the Municipal Act, 2001. As such, whenever general changes are made to municipal governance in Ontario, both the Municipal Act, 2001 and the City of Toronto Act, 2006 are amended.

== See also ==
- Politics of Toronto
- Common Sense Revolution – see entry on Bill 103
- Metro Toronto (former Government body)
- New Deal for Toronto Act
