= Albert Campbell (Canadian politician) =

Canadian politician

3rd Metro Toronto Chairman
- In office October 1, 1969 – July 30, 1973
- Preceded by: William R. Allen
- Succeeded by: Paul Godfrey

1st Mayor of Scarborough, Ontario
- In office 1967–1969
- Preceded by: Office established
- Succeeded by: Robert W. White

32nd Reeve of Scarborough, Ontario
- In office 1957–1967
- Preceded by: A. Harris
- Succeeded by: Office abolished

Personal details
- Born: Albert McTaggart Campbell; May 21, 1910 Ridgetown, Ontario
- Died: August 30, 1973 (aged 63) Scarborough, Ontario
- Resting place: St. Margaret's Cemetery (St. Margaret's in the Pines)
- Party: Liberal

Albert McTaggart "Ab" Campbell (May 21, 1910 – August 30, 1973) was a Canadian politician and the Chairman of Metropolitan Toronto from 1969 to 1973.

== Background ==
Campbell was born on a family farm in Ridgetown, Ontario, in 1910 to John M. Campbell and Isabella McTaggart. He attended the Ontario Agricultural College at Guelph and graduated with a B.S.C. from the University of Toronto in 1933. After leaving the family farm he was, for almost 15 years, a secondary school teacher (Ridgetown Vocational, now Ridgetown District High School) teaching chemistry, physics and math. In 1944, he moved briefly to East York before settling in Scarborough on his wife's (nee Helen E. Huber, 1910-2005) family farm, which they inherited after her uncle James G. Cornell's death. Both Cornell (1913-1919) and her grandmother's cousin John Richardson (1881-1894) were prior Reeves of Scarborough Township. Campbell kept the 19-acre (7.7-hectare) family farm on Lot 18, Concession C, bound by Eglinton Avenue, Kingston Road and Markham Road, until the end of his life despite the transformation of Scarborough from a semi-rural community to a metropolitan suburb.

== Politics ==
Campbell's political career began as a Scarborough (public) school board trustee in 1950, then as councillor for Ward 3 (Scarborough Village) and as deputy reeve. In 1957, Campbell became reeve of the township of Scarborough for the next 11 years. When the township was incorporated as a borough in 1967, he became its first mayor from 1967 until 1969. During his years as Reeve and Mayor, he also sat on the Metropolitan Toronto Council.

On October 1, 1969, he was elected by the Metropolitan Toronto council to the position of chairman, defeating former North York reeve Norman C. Goodhead by 21 votes to 11 on the third ballot. He was re-elected to the position unanimously in January 1972 but, ill with cancer, he retired on July 30, 1973, and died shortly thereafter. During his career, he had also served as president of the Canadian Federation of Mayors and Municipalities, the Ontario Municipal Association, and the Association of Ontario Mayors and Reeves.

He attempted to enter provincial politics twice. He was defeated for the Ontario Liberal Party nomination for York—Scarborough prior to the 1959 provincial election to former reeve Oliver E. Crockford. Four years later, he won the Liberal nomination in the new Scarborough Centre riding (York-Scarborough was split into 4 ridings), but was defeated in the 1963 provincial election placing third in a close race.

Where Campbell's predecessors as Metro Chairman, Fred Gardiner and William Allen, had driven their agendas at Metro Council, Campbell saw himself more as Council's servant with the duty to implement the policies decided upon by the assembly.

== Legacy ==
Albert Campbell Square at the Scarborough Civic Centre, was dedicated by Queen Elizabeth II months prior to his death, the Albert Campbell District Library (opened in 1971), and a Scarborough high school, Albert Campbell Collegiate Institute, are named after him. The school opened after his death in 1975. The Cornell Campbell farm at Kingston Road and Markham Road has been preserved, with the Scarborough Village Theatre and Scarborough Village Recreation Centre on the site.
