= Canadian National Exhibition Association Act =

Ontario provincial statute

The Canadian National Exhibition Association Act is an Ontario provincial statute first passed in 1983 and amended in 1999 to establish the governance and operation of the Canadian National Exhibition.

== Changes and non-profit status ==
The 1999 amendments changed the composition of its membership and of the Board of Directors.

In 2013, the CNEA became an independent non-profit corporation and pays rent to the City of Toronto government to use Exhibition Place (a city-owned property and subject to the City of Toronto Act). As such CNEA members no longer sit on the Exhibition Place Board.

== See also ==
- Royal Agricultural Winter Fair - which is held at Exhibition Place but operated by the Royal Agricultural Winter Fair Association independent from the Exhibition Place
