= William Allen (Canadian politician) =

Canadian lawyer and politician

William R. Allen
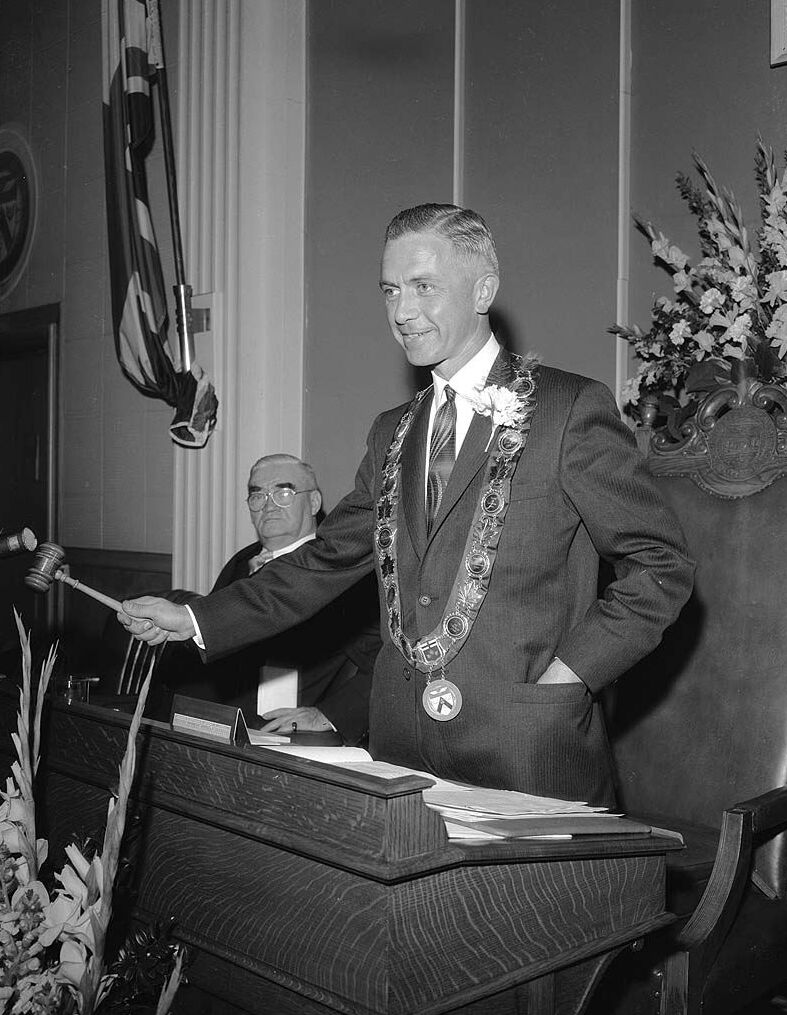
- Allen in 1962

2nd Metro Toronto Chairman
- In office January 10, 1962 – September 30, 1969
- Preceded by: Fred Gardiner
- Succeeded by: Albert Campbell

Personal details
- Born: June 29, 1919 Buckingham, Quebec
- Died: October 1, 1985 (aged 66) Toronto, Ontario
- Spouse: Marjorie Hornberger
- Children: Frank, Rosemary, and Jane

William Randall Allen QC (June 29, 1919 – October 1, 1985) was a Canadian lawyer and politician who served as the Chairman of the Municipality of Metropolitan Toronto from 1962 to 1969. He is the namesake of the William R. Allen Road in Toronto, Ontario.

== Background ==
Born in Buckingham, Quebec (on the outskirts of Ottawa, Ontario), Allen was a graduate of St. Michael's College School, the University of Toronto, and Osgoode Hall Law School. During World War II, he enlisted with the Queen's York Rangers and attained the rank of captain, serving overseas in Britain and Europe.

After being called to the Ontario Bar in 1949, Allen was appointed Queen's Counsel in 1960. He married Marjorie Hornberger; together, they raised three children.

His father, Robert Aloysius Allen, was an alderman and then a Liberal Member of Provincial Parliament representing Riverdale during the 1930s. Robert Allen was the first Liberal to be elected to the legislature from Riverdale since Confederation in 1867. Robert Allen's father-in-law, Randall McDonnell, was the mayor of Mayo, Quebec for 13 consecutive years.

== Politics ==
In 1950, William Allen entered municipal politics with his election as an alderman on Toronto city council, representing Riverdale in Ward 1. He subsequently was elected by the City of Toronto to become the youngest Controller in Toronto history. He was a member of the first Metropolitan Toronto Council in 1952. In the 1955 Toronto municipal election, Allen was elected to the Toronto Board of Control and was re-elected in 1956, 1958, and 1960. In 1958 and 1960 he finished in the top two, of the four controllers elected, enabling him to return to Metro Council.

Metropolitan Toronto was created by the Province of Ontario in 1952 and comprised Toronto, North York, Scarborough, Etobicoke, York, and East York. While these municipalities continued to manage some local matters, Metropolitan Toronto assumed the responsibilities of more expensive programs, such as the TTC, police, and welfare. The municipality was presided over by a "super mayor", or Metro chairman, for its 46-year duration until amalgamation in 1998.

Undefeated in civic elections, Allen remained in municipal office until 1962 when, upon the retirement of Fred Gardiner (namesake of the Gardiner Expressway), Allen defeated the Reeve of North York, Norman C. Goodhead, to become the second Chairman of Metropolitan Toronto. At the time, many felt Allen's Catholicism would serve as a roadblock in the election.

Allen continued to build the infrastructure that began with his predecessor, Metro's first chairman, Fred Gardiner. Most notably, the Bloor-Danforth and University subway lines opened during Allen's tenure. Furthermore, Allen also initiated many social programs that included welfare assistance and old age homes. Allen cited the latter initiative as one of his proudest achievements. Metro's fourth chair, Paul V. Godfrey, told reporters after Allen's death 25 years later that he gave Metro its "human touch". (Toronto Star, October 1/85)

Allen retired from the post in 1969. After leaving politics, he served as president and CEO to several corporations and sat on the board of directors for Molson, Air Canada, York University, the Toronto Stock Exchange, and others. Allen continued to practice law before being appointed president of the Canadian National Exhibition from 1979 to 1980.

During his political career, Allen served on all city council and metropolitan council standing committees. He also held positions with a number of external bodies. He was president of the Ontario Municipal Association, honorary president of the Convention and Tourist Bureau of Metropolitan Toronto, and honorary vice-president of Boy Scouts of Canada.

Allen maintained similar policies set out by his predecessor, Fred Gardiner. Toronto was going through a period of change, and he did little to impede that process. He presided over the expansion of the subway network and continued with the expressway building program, which was cancelled after his exit from politics.

== Retirement ==
Upon his retirement, the Spadina Expressway was renamed the William R. Allen Expressway (now the William R. Allen Road) in honour of Allen's distinguished civic service. The "Allen" runs from Kennard Avenue (Wilson Heights Boulevard link) in the north, to Eglinton Avenue West in the south.

Allen strongly opposed amalgamation until his death in 1985 (Globe and Mail, October 1/85). He is buried at Mount Hope Catholic Cemetery.
