= Chairman of the Municipality of Metropolitan Toronto =

Regional chair of Metropolitan Toronto, Ontario, Canada

- Flag of Metropolitan Toronto
- Seat: Metro Hall, Metro Square, Toronto
- Appointer: Premier of Ontario (First Chairman) Metropolitan Toronto Council
- Precursor: Warden of York County, Ontario
- Formation: 1953
- First holder: Fred Gardiner
- Final holder: Alan Tonks
- Abolished: 1998
- Succession: Mayor of Toronto

The chairman of the Municipality of Metropolitan Toronto or Metro Chairman was the regional chair of Metropolitan Toronto, Ontario, Canada, and the most senior political figure in the municipality. The Metro Chairman was elected by the members of Metropolitan Toronto Council.

== New level of government ==
The position was created in 1953 when Metropolitan Toronto was created by the province of Ontario as a new urban county-level municipality out of the southernmost part of the-then York County. It had exactly the same boundaries as the present-day City of Toronto, but originally consisted of thirteen cities and boroughs, each with its own mayor. These cities included the City of Toronto and what were then its surrounding suburbs: the towns of New Toronto, Mimico, Weston, and Leaside; the villages of Long Branch, Swansea, and Forest Hill; and the townships of Etobicoke, York, North York, East York, and Scarborough.

Metropolitan Toronto was the government entity responsible for co-ordinating various activities within the metropolitan area, including policing and transportation.

Fred Gardiner was appointed by the Premier of Ontario Leslie Frost as the first Metro Chairman. He was subsequently re-elected to the position by Metro Council.

Metro's first two chairmen—Fred Gardiner and William R. Allen—were each honoured with an expressway bearing their name upon retirement.

== Chair's relationship to council ==
For Metro's first three decades, the Metro Chairman was not required to be an elected member of Metro Council, and it was customary for a new Metro Chairman to resign from his previous position upon becoming chairman.

In 1987, Metro Council was reformed by the province so that Metro councillors were directly elected to the body. (They had previously been drawn from among local city and borough councils.) Under this reform, the chair was required to be a Metro Councillor representing a ward and could not be a non or former member of Metro Council. City mayors, who remained on the reformed Metro Council, were also not permitted to be elected to the position of Metro Chairman.

Accordingly, in the 1988 municipal election incumbent Metro Chairman Dennis Flynn was required to run for election from a Metro ward if he wanted to be re-elected as Metro Chairman. As well, Alan Tonks, ran for a Metro Council seat rather than for re-election as Mayor of York as he wished to challenge Flynn for the position of Metro Chairman which was voted upon by Metro Council at its first meeting following the municipal election. Both Flynn and Tonks were elected as Metro Councillors and Tonks defeated Flynn in the vote for Metro Chairman.

== Amalgamation ==
The position ceased to exist when the six municipalities of Metro Toronto were amalgamated into the City of Toronto. The newly created position of mayor for the resulting single-tier "megacity" replaced not only the mayors of the former Metro municipalities, but also abolished the office of Metro Chairman.

== List of chairmen of the Municipality of Metropolitan Toronto ==
- Fred Gardiner (1953–1962) - former Reeve of Forest Hill
- William R. Allen (1962–1969) - former member of the Board of Control for the City of Toronto.
- Albert Campbell (1969–1973) - former Mayor of Scarborough
- Paul Godfrey (1973–1984) - former alderman and Metro Councillor for the Borough of North York
- Dennis Flynn (1984–1987) - former Mayor of Etobicoke
- Alan Tonks (1987–1997) - Metro Councillor from and former Mayor of the City of York

=== Elections ===
With the exception of the initial appointment of the Metro Chairman in 1953 by the provincial government, Metro Chairmen were elected by Metropolitan Toronto Council.

Gardiner was appointed Metro Chairman by the province in 1953. In January 1955, he stood for election to the position and was acclaimed.

Below is a list of contest elections for Metropolitan Toronto Chairman:

==== 1962 election ====
Toronto Controller William R. Allen - 14
North York Reeve Norman C. Goodhead - 10

Source: "Allen New Metro Chief", Toronto Globe and Mail, January 10, 1962

==== 1969 election ====
First Ballot
former North York Reeve Norman C. Goodhead - 11
Scarborough Mayor Albert Campbell - 9
former Etobicoke Reeve John MacBeth - 8
Toronto Alderman David Rotenberg - 4

Second Ballot
Albert Campbell - 14
Norman C. Goodhead - 10
John MacBeth - 8

Third Ballot
Albert Campbell - 21
Norman C. Goodhead - 11

Source: "Campbell is elected Metro chairman", Came, Barry. The Globe and Mail (1936–2016); Toronto, Ont. [Toronto, Ont]01 Oct 1969: 1

==== 1973 election ====
First Ballot
North York Controller Paul Godfrey - 14
Toronto Alderman Reid Scott - 8
Scarborough Controller Kenneth Morrish - 4
Toronto Alderman William Archer - 3
Toronto Alderman John Sewell - 3

Second ballot
Paul Godfrey - 17
Reid Scott - 11
Kenneth Morrish - 3

Source: "Godfrey at 34 youngest ever to head Metro", Toronto Star (1971–2009); Toronto, Ontario [Toronto, Ontario]03 July 1973: 1.

==== 1975 election ====
Paul Godfrey (incumbent) - 32
Toronto Alderman John Sewell - 1
Toronto Alderman Michael Goldrick - 1
Toronto Alderman Dan Heap - 1

Source: "The Godfrey opposition: One vote for each as three in Reform Caucus use election for chance to criticize Metro chairman", The Globe and Mail (1936–2016); Jan 15, 1975; pg. 5

==== 1977 election ====
Paul Godfrey (incumbent) - 31
Toronto Alderman John Sewell - 4

Source: "Godfrey re-elected as Metro chairman", The Globe and Mail (1936–2016); Jan 12, 1977; pg. 4

==== 1978 election ====
Paul Godfrey (incumbent) - 28
Scarborough Controller Joyce Trimmer - 8

(Toronto alderman David White and Allan Sparrow were nominated but declined to run) Source: "Godfrey easily beats 3 rivals, keeps top Metro post", Baker, Alden, The Globe and Mail (1936–2016); Dec 13, 1978, pg. 4

==== 1980 election ====
Paul Godfrey (incumbent) - 34
Toronto Alderman Anne Johnston - 5

Source: "Godfrey returned as Metro Chairman", The Globe and Mail (1936–2016); Toronto, Ont. [Toronto, Ont]10 Dec 1980: 13

==== 1982 election ====
Paul Godfrey (incumbent) - 33
Toronto Alderman Richard Gilbert - 6

Source: "Godfrey defends Cabinet ties", Baker, Alden. The Globe and Mail; Toronto, Ont. [Toronto, Ont]15 Dec 1982: 3.

==== 1984 election ====
Etobicoke Mayor Dennis Flynn - 24
York Controller Fergy Brown - 7
York Mayor Alan Tonks - 4
Toronto Alderman Richard Gilbert - 4

Source: "Flynn voted chairman by Metro councillors", York, Geoffrey. The Globe and Mail (1936–2016); Toronto, Ont. [Toronto, Ont]01 Sep 1984: 1

==== 1985 election ====
Dennis Flynn (incumbent) - 33
Toronto Councillor Richard Gilbert - 6

Source: "At Metro style beats substance", Toronto Star, December 11, 1985

==== 1988 election ====
First Ballot
Alan Tonks - 17
Dennis Flynn (incumbent) - 11
Richard Gilbert - 6

Second Ballot
Alan Tonks - 18
Dennis Flynn (incumbent) - 16

Source: "Alan Tonks is voted new Metro Chairman": [FIN Edition], Jim Byers and Michael Smith, Toronto Star.Toronto Star; Toronto, Ont. [Toronto, Ont]14 Dec 1988: A1

==== 1991 election ====
Alan Tonks (incumbent) - 28
Joe Pantalone - 6

Source: "Tonks easily turns back challenge for chairman's job Pantalone gathers little support for 'quality of life' plan", Coutts, Jane.The Globe and Mail; Toronto, Ont. [Toronto, Ont]06 Dec 1991: A.11.

==== 1994 election ====
Alan Tonks (incumbent) - 21
Joe Pantalone - 10
Brian Ashton - 3

Source: "Tonks takes Metro again in easy win": [MET Edition], Toronto Star; Toronto, Ont. [Toronto, Ont]09 Dec 1994: A1.

== See also ==
- Gardiner Expressway
- William R. Allen Road
- Albert Campbell Collegiate Institute and Albert Campbell Square
- List of Toronto mayors - the "megacity" mayor replaced the Metro Chairman in 1998
