= Metropolitan Toronto =

Coordinates: 43.7072°N 79.3805°W

- Dissolved region
- Municipality of Metropolitan Toronto
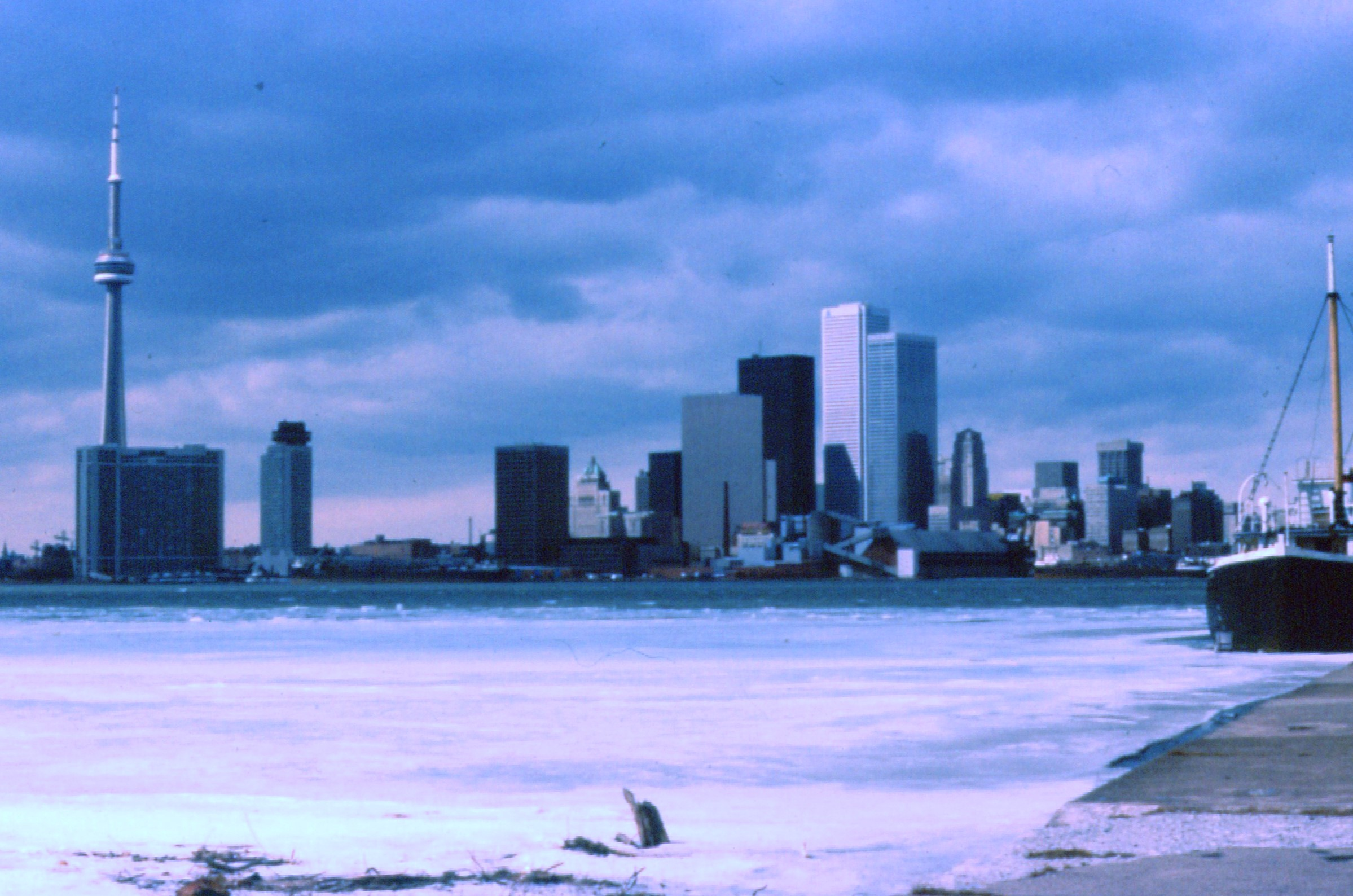
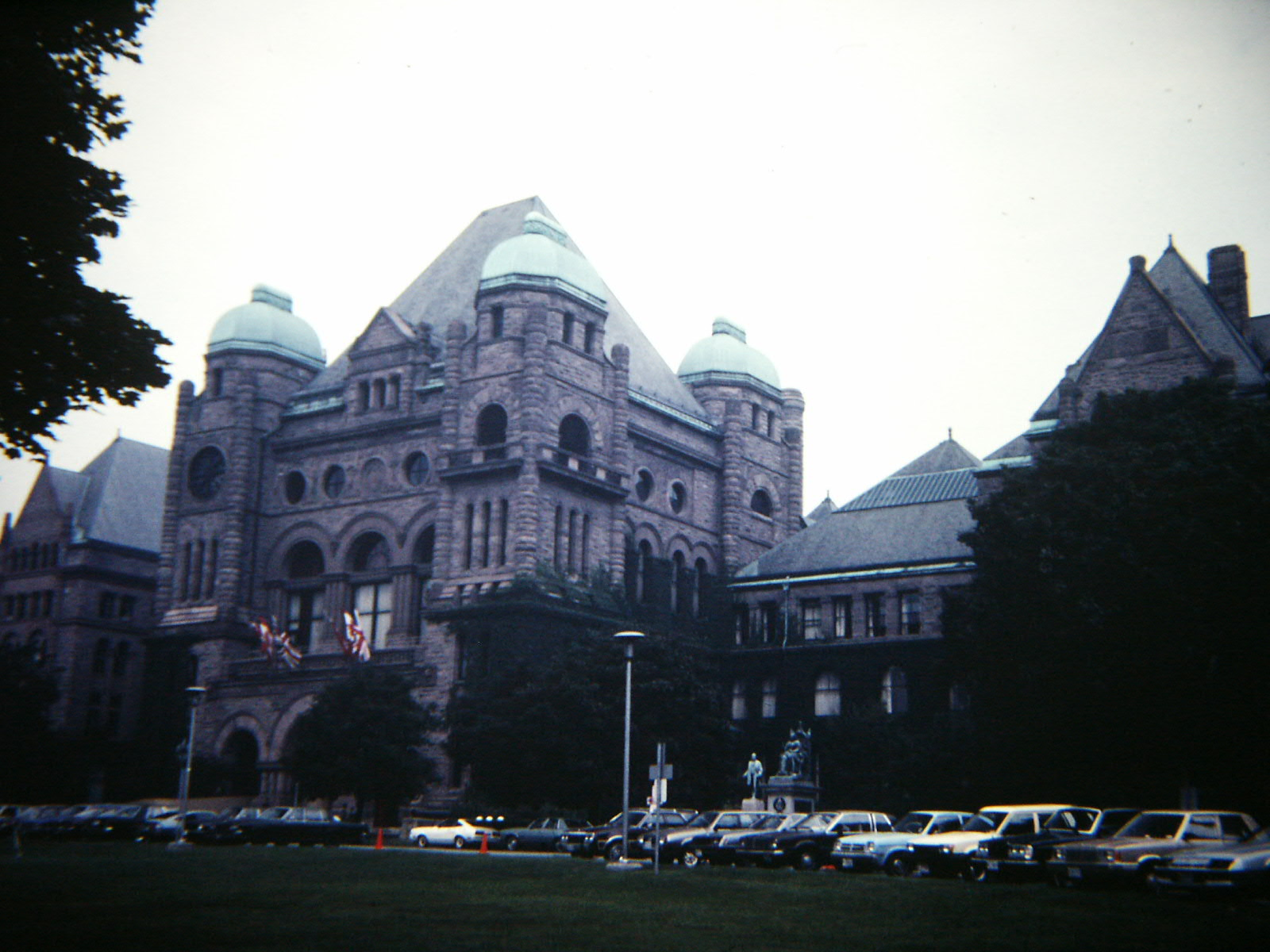
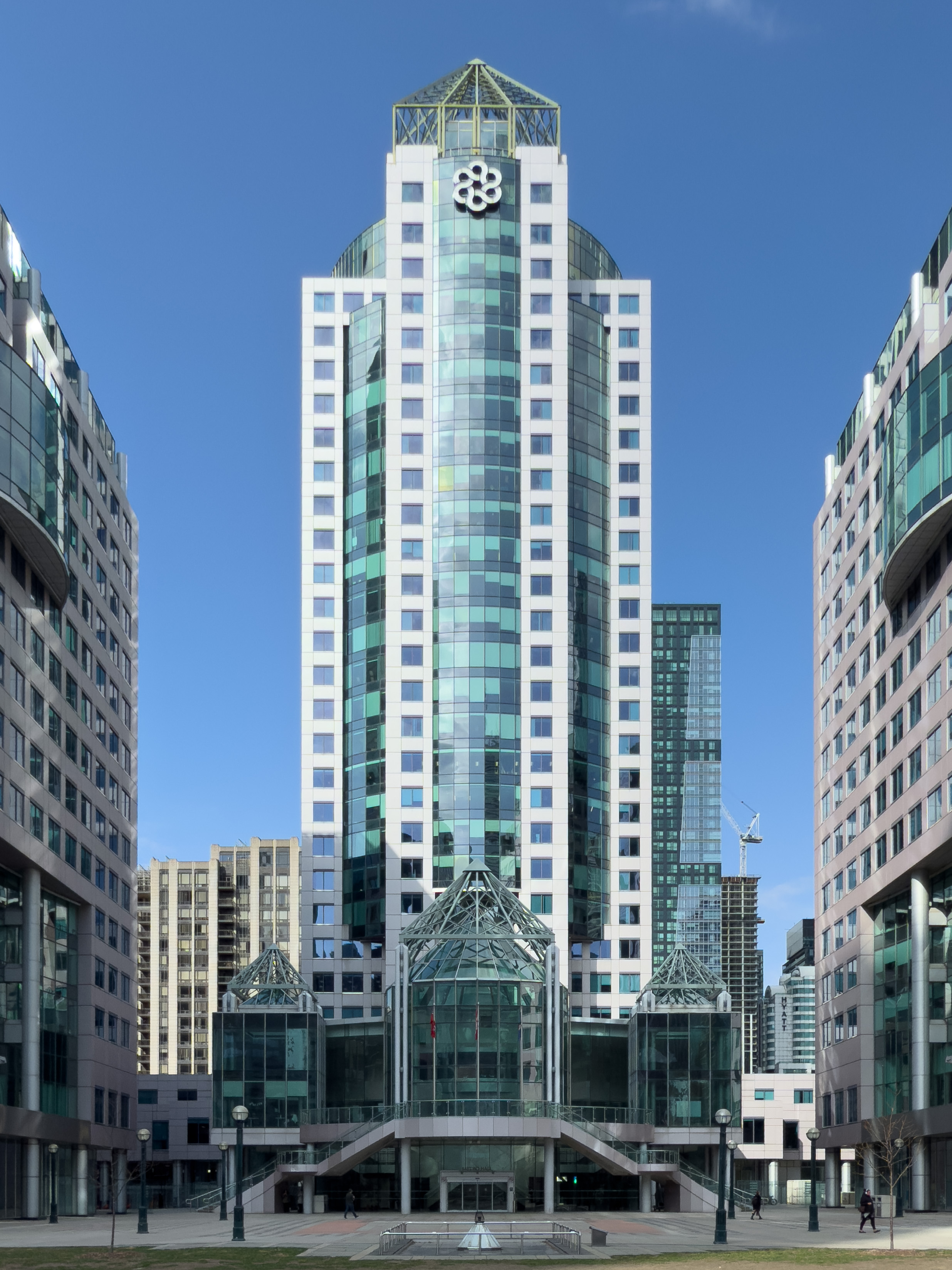
- Skyline of downtown Toronto as seen from Port of Toronto Ontario Legislative Building Metro Hall

- Flag Seal
- Nicknames: Metro, Metro Toronto
- Location of Metropolitan Toronto in Greater Toronto Area
- Country: Canada
- Province: Ontario
- Incorporated: 1953 from York County
- Changed status: 1998 into Toronto

Government
  - Type: Council–manager government
  - Body: Metropolitan Toronto Council
  - Chairman: Alan Tonks (last)

Area
  - Total: 630 km^{2} (240 sq mi)
- Time zone: UTC−05:00 (EST)
  - Summer (DST): UTC−04:00 (DST)

The Municipality of Metropolitan Toronto was an upper-tier level of municipal government in Ontario, Canada, from 1953 to 1998. It was made up of the old city of Toronto and numerous townships, towns and villages that surrounded Toronto, which were starting to urbanize rapidly after World War II. It was commonly referred to as "Metro Toronto" or "Metro".

Passage of the 1997 City of Toronto Act caused the 1998 amalgamation of Metropolitan Toronto and its constituents into the current City of Toronto. The boundaries of present-day Toronto are the same as those of Metropolitan Toronto upon its dissolution: Lake Ontario to the south, Etobicoke Creek and Highway 427 to the west, Steeles Avenue to the north, and the Rouge River to the east.

== History ==
=== City and suburbs ===
Prior to the formation of Metropolitan Toronto, the municipalities surrounding the central city of Toronto were all independent townships, towns and villages within York County. After 1912, the city no longer annexed suburbs from York Township. At times, the suburbs asked to be annexed into Toronto, but the city chose not to do so.

In 1924, Ontario cabinet minister George S. Henry was the first to propose a 'metropolitan district' with its own council, separate from the city and the county, to administer shared services. He wrote a draft bill, but the government chose not to act on it.

The Great Depression saw almost all of the towns and villages of the county become insolvent. When that happened, they were financially taken over by the province. In 1933, Henry, now the premier, appointed a formal inquiry into forming a metropolitan district. A proposal was made for Toronto to provide several of its services to the suburbs as well. The inquiry died with the defeat of Henry in 1934.

In the 1930s, a Liberal Ontario government named the first minister of municipal affairs, David A. Croll, and introduced a draft bill to amalgamate Toronto and the built-up suburbs. The draft bill faced strong opposition in Toronto and was withdrawn. The government then started its own inquiry into issues of the suburbs surrounding Toronto. Through consensus, it came to the conclusion that a metropolitan municipality was the best solution. The inquiry reported in September 1939, and its conclusions were put aside for the duration of World War II.

Two factors changed in the 1940s. A Progressive Conservative Party of Ontario (PCO) government was elected in 1943, with a changed policy, intending to promote economic growth through government action. Also in 1943, the first master plan was adopted in Toronto. It recognized that future growth would take place in the vacant land of adjacent suburbs. Planning would have to take into account the whole metropolitan area.

Forest Hill reeve Fred Gardiner, who was politically well-connected to newly elected PC premier George Drew, now promoted the idea of ambitious new programs to lay the capital infrastructure for growth. In 1946, the province passed the Planning Act, which required each urban municipality to have its own Planning Board. A Toronto and Suburban Planning Board was founded, under the chairmanship of James P. Maher, and the vice-chairmanship of Fred Gardiner. The Board promoted specific projects, and also promoted a suburban 'green belt', a unified system of arterial roads and the creation of a single public transit network.

The Board was ineffective. Projects such as a bridge across the Don River Valley and the Spadina Road Extension (the basis for the later Spadina Expressway) were rejected by the local municipalities. Gardiner, elected as chairman of the board in 1949, wrote to Premier Leslie Frost that only a unified municipality could measure up to the problems. In 1950, the City of Toronto Council voted to adopt an amalgamated city, while nearly all of the suburbs rejected the amalgamation.

From 1950 until 1951, the Ontario Municipal Board held hearings on the proposal, under the chairmanship of Lorne Cumming. The Board worked until 1953, releasing its report on January 20, 1953. Cumming's report proposed a compromise solution: a two-tiered government, with the formation of a Metropolitan government, governed by a Metropolitan Council, to provide strategic functions, while existing municipalities would retain all other services. He rejected full amalgamation, citing a need to preserve 'a government which is very close to the local residents.'

=== Formation ===
The Frost government moved immediately and on February 25, 1953, introduced the bill (An Act to provide for the Federation of the Municipalities in the Toronto Metropolitan Area for Certain Financial and Other Purposes) to create the Municipality of Metropolitan Toronto. The new municipality would have the power to tax real estate and borrow funds on its own. It would be responsible for arterial roads, major sewage and water facilities, regional planning, public transportation, administration of justice, metropolitan parks and housing issues as needed. The municipalities retained their individual fire and police departments, business licensing, public health and libraries.

The council would have its own chairman, selected by the province initially, then to be elected by the Council itself after 1955. Premier Frost convinced Fred Gardiner, who still preferred amalgamation, over the metro scheme, to take the job. Gardiner was well known to Frost through the Conservative Party, was well-off, was felt to be beyond personal corruption. Gardiner accepted the position partly due to his friendship with Frost, and he demanded that he retain his corporate connections. He also felt that the job would be "bigger than anything he had tried before." The bill to form Metro was passed on April 2, 1953. The Gardiner appointment was announced on April 7.

In Canada, the creation of municipalities falls under provincial jurisdiction. Thus it was provincial legislation, the Metropolitan Toronto Act, that created this level of government in 1953. When it took effect in 1954, the portion of York Township not yet annexed by Toronto, as well as all of Scarborough and Etobicoke Townships were incorporated as part of the Municipality of Metropolitan Toronto, and seceded from York County.

Metropolitan Toronto Council had its inaugural meeting on April 15, 1953, and was made up of the Metro chairman, Frederick Gardiner, who had been appointed by the province; the mayor of Toronto; Toronto's two most senior controllers; nine senior aldermen from the City of Toronto; and the twelve suburban mayors and reeves.

Metro Toronto was composed of the City of Toronto, the towns of New Toronto, Mimico, Weston and Leaside; the villages of Long Branch, Swansea and Forest Hill and the townships of Etobicoke, York, North York, East York, and Scarborough.

Metropolitan Toronto had planning authority over the surrounding townships such as Vaughan, Markham, and Pickering, although these areas did not have representation on Metro Council.

=== Growth and mergers ===
Gardiner was Metro chairman from 1953 until the end of 1961. During his tenure, Metro built numerous infrastructure projects, including the opening of the first subway line, start of construction of the second subway line, water and sewage treatment facilities, rental housing for the aged and the Gardiner Expressway, named after Gardiner. Metro also amalgamated the various police forces into one in 1956. It was a period of rapid development of the suburban municipalities of Metro. The population of Metropolitan Toronto increased from one million to 1.6 million by the time he left office.

As a result of continued growth, the province reorganized Metro in 1967. The seven small towns and villages, which were no longer any denser than the surrounding areas, were merged into their surrounding municipalities. This left the City of Toronto and the five townships, which at this time were re-designated as boroughs (all but East York were later incorporated as cities). Long Branch, New Toronto, and Mimico were absorbed back into Etobicoke; Weston was absorbed into York; Leaside into East York; and Swansea and Forest Hill, into Toronto, resulting in an unusual final situation where none of the municipalities outside the city were ever entities founded as distinct historic urban settlements in their own right. The reorganized Metropolitan Toronto adopted a flag and decal using a symbol of six rings representing the six municipalities.

==== Development pattern ====
Development in Metro Toronto generally unfurled outward smoothly from the City of Toronto into the surrounding municipalities with little leapfrogging, giving it a core-to-suburb continuum that ignored municipal boundaries, resulting in it having the structure of a single city. For example, most of the areas of the small inner boroughs of York and East York, were in effect, extensions of inner city Toronto and gradually transitioned into the more typical suburban areas of the outer municipalities (which also had such inner-city areas where they bordered Toronto). Given that none of the boroughs originated as distinct settlements, they did not have their own downtowns. To give themselves an identity distinct from the City of Toronto (which was deemed particularly important after being reincorporated as cities), North York and Scarborough built planned city centres: North York City Centre and Scarborough City Centre respectively. This pattern was in contrast to other metropolitan areas like Hamilton-Wentworth, where suburbs such as Stoney Creek had historic cores and whose inner areas were well separated from inner-city Hamilton.

As the seats on Metro Council were reapportioned according to population, the council was now dominated by the suburban majority; but it continued to address suburban and inner city issues in equal measure.

=== Amalgamation ===
In the 1995 provincial election, PCO leader Mike Harris campaigned on reducing the level of government in Ontario as part of his Common Sense Revolution platform, and promised to examine Metropolitan Toronto with an eye to eliminating it. However, in the end the Harris government announced what they saw as a superior cost-saving plan. The six municipalities of Metro Toronto would be amalgamated into a single-tier city of Toronto. This was a major break from the past, which had seen the core simply annex suburbs. Similar amalgamations were planned for other parts of Ontario, such as Ottawa and Hamilton.

The announcement touched off vociferous public objections to what the media termed the "megacity" plan. In March 1997 a referendum in all six municipalities produced a vote of more than 3:1 against amalgamation. However, municipal governments in Canada are creatures of the provincial governments, and referendums have little to no legal effect. The Harris government could thus legally ignore the results of the referendum, and did so in April when it tabled the City of Toronto Act. Both opposition parties held a filibuster in the provincial legislature, proposing more than 12,000 amendments that allowed residents on streets of the proposed megacity take part in public hearings on the merger and adding historical designations to the streets. This only delayed the bill's inevitable passage, given the PCO's majority. The amalgamation would take place effective January 1, 1998, at which time the new City of Toronto (legal successor of Old Toronto) came into existence.

== Political structure ==
Originally, members of the Metropolitan Toronto Council also sat on their respective lower-tier councils; they were not directly elected to the upper-tier council, and because Toronto councillors often voted in a bloc, inner-city issues tended to dominate.

From its inception in 1953 until the 1966 municipal election, Metropolitan Toronto Council consisted of the mayor of Toronto, two members of the Toronto Board of Control (the top two finishers of the four in municipal election) and one mayor or reeve from each of the 12 suburbs, and was presided over by the Metro chairman who did not have a seat.

With the 1966 election, as the result of the reorganization of the 13 municipalities into the City of Toronto and five boroughs, representation on Metropolitan Toronto Council also changed and the body was expanded from 22 to 32 seats, with greater representation from the suburbs which now had 20 out of 32 seats on the body – up from 11 out of 22 with seats roughly allocated according to population. The distribution of seats was as follows. Toronto (12), North York (6), Scarborough (5), Etobicoke (4), York (3), East York (2).

The new Metro Council was made up of the mayor of Toronto, two of the four members of the Toronto Board of Control, senior aldermen from the nine wards of the City of Toronto, the mayor of Scarborough and the four members of Scarborough's Board of Control, the mayor of Etobicoke and three of the four members of Etobicoke's Board of Control (the top three in terms of votes), the mayor of York and its two Controllers, the mayor of East York and one alderman, selected by East York council, the mayor of North York, all four members of North York's Board of Control, and one alderman selected by North York's council. After the Toronto Board of Control was abolished with the 1969 Toronto municipal election, Toronto's contingent on Metro Council was made up of the mayor of Toronto and 11 senior aldermen – with the nine previous city wards being redrawn into 11 wards.

In the City of Toronto the person who achieved the greatest number of votes in a ward was named the senior alderman. The person with the second most votes was the junior alderman. Both aldermen sat on the Toronto City Council, but only the senior alderman sat on Metro Council. With the 1985 Toronto municipal election the Metro Councillor and City Councillor in the City of Toronto were elected separately though from the same ward. The Metro Councillors still sat on both the Toronto and Metro Council, however. The suburbs retained the status quo and still did not have direct elections to Metro.

The Province of Ontario changed this arrangement with the 1988 municipal election, requiring direct elections to Metro Council from all of Metro's municipalities and severing the links between the two tiers. The suburban boards of control were abolished and Metro Councillors were elected from new Metro Wards, which were larger than the city and borough wards. Now only the mayors of the six member municipalities sat on both the upper-tier and lower-tier councils.

=== Metro chairman ===
The first chairman of Metropolitan Toronto, Fred Gardiner, was appointed by the province; subsequent chairmen were elected by Metro Council itself. The Metro chairman was, for many years, an ex-officio member of the council without having to be elected to Metro Council by constituents as either a local mayor, controller, alderman or councillor. Beginning in 1988, the position of chairman was chosen by council members from amongst its own members (excluding mayors who could vote for Metro councillors but could no longer run for the position).

As usual in Ontario municipalities, these councils were non-partisan, although in later years some councillors (and candidates) did identify themselves explicitly as members of particular political parties. Metro councillors were elected by plurality.

==== List of Metro chairmen ====
From the inception of Metro Toronto until amalgamation, there were six chairmen altogether:

- Fred Gardiner (1953–1962) – former Reeve of Forest Hill
- William R. Allen (1962–1969) – former member of the Board of Control for the City of Toronto.
- Albert Campbell (1969–1973) – former mayor of Scarborough
- Paul Godfrey (1973–1984) – former alderman and Metro Councillor for the Borough of North York
- Dennis Flynn (1984–1987) – former mayor of Etobicoke
- Alan Tonks (1987–1997) – Metro Councillor from and former mayor of the City of York

=== Wards ===
Metro Toronto wards established in 1988 were given names that contained the number of the ward, name of municipality and the name of the local communities:

==== East York ====
- Metro Toronto Ward 1 – East York

==== Etobicoke ====
- Metro Toronto Ward 2 – Lakeshore-Queensway
- Metro Toronto Ward 3 – Kingsway-Humber
- Metro Toronto Ward 4 – Markland Centennial
- Metro Toronto Ward 5 – Rexdale-Thistletown

==== North York ====
- Metro Toronto Ward 6 – North York Humber
- Metro Toronto Ward 7 – Black Creek
- Metro Toronto Ward 8 – North York Spadina
- Metro Toronto Ward 9 – North York Centre South
- Metro Toronto Ward 10 – North York Centre
- Metro Toronto Ward 11 – Don Parkway
- Metro Toronto Ward 12 – Seneca Heights

==== Scarborough ====
- Metro Toronto Ward 13 – Scarborough Bluffs
- Metro Toronto Ward 14 – Scarborough Wexford
- Metro Toronto Ward 15 – Scarborough City Centre
- Metro Toronto Ward 16 – Scarborough Highland Creek
- Metro Toronto Ward 17 – Scarborough Agincourt
- Metro Toronto Ward 18 – Scarborough Malvern

==== Toronto ====
- Metro Toronto Ward 19 – High Park
- Metro Toronto Ward 20 – Trinity-Spadina
- Metro Toronto Ward 21 – Davenport
- Metro Toronto Ward 22 – North Toronto
- Metro Toronto Ward 23 – Midtown
- Metro Toronto Ward 24 – Downtown
- Metro Toronto Ward 25 – Don River
- Metro Toronto Ward 26 – East Toronto

==== York ====
- Metro Toronto Ward 27 – York Humber
- Metro Toronto Ward 28 – York Eglinton

== City Hall and Metro Hall ==
At its inception in 1953, Metro was headquartered at a six-floor building at 67 Adelaide Street East (now home to Adelaide Resource Centre for Women). When the new Toronto City Hall opened in 1965, one of its twin towers was intended for Metro Toronto offices and the other for the City of Toronto; the two councils shared the central Council Chamber. Eventually this space proved inadequate and committee facilities and councillors' offices were relocated to an office tower at the southwest corner of Bay and Richmond Street (390 Bay Street), across from City Hall; Metro Council continued to meet in the City Hall council chamber. Finally, in 1992, the Metro government moved out of Toronto City Hall altogether and into a newly constructed Metro Hall at 55 John Street, which was designed by Brisbin Brook Beynon Architects (BBB Architects).

The amalgamated council chose to meet at City Hall, though it temporarily met at Metro Hall while City Hall was retrofitted for the enlarged council. Metro Hall continues to be used as office space by the City of Toronto.

== Services ==
A Metropolitan Toronto plaque on a city overpass.

The following is a list of services that were funded and provided by the Metro government:

- Economic Development Division
- Metro Toronto Welfare and Social Services (Welfare, homes for the aged, children's services)
- Metro Toronto Police (since renamed Toronto Police Service and retains the Metropolitan Toronto Police Force's coat of arms in its logo)
- Toronto Transit Commission
- Metro Toronto Parks and Property (Regional parks including the Toronto Islands, waterfront park and valley park systems)
- Metro Toronto Planning (Regional planning)
- Metro Toronto Treasury
- Metro Toronto Clerk
- Metro Toronto Legal
- Metro Toronto Personnel
- Metro Toronto Roads and Traffic (now Toronto Transportation)
- Metro Toronto Ambulance (renamed Toronto Ambulance Service (TAS) then later Toronto EMS)
- Metro Toronto Works (Sewage treatment, water filtration and distribution; now split into Toronto Water and Toronto Solid Waste Management)
- solid waste disposal (but not collection, which was a lower-tier responsibility)
- Social services, hostels, public housing, children's services: Metro Toronto Community Services, Metro Toronto Hostel Services Division, and Metro Toronto Housing Authority (now Toronto Community Housing Corporation)
- The Metro Toronto Library (now Toronto Public Library), which directly operated the Metro Toronto Reference Library and provided coordination between the municipal public libraries within Metro
- Metro Toronto Audit
- Metropolitan Toronto School Board consisted of six public secular school boards and one French entity: East York, Etobicoke, North York, Scarborough, Toronto, York and the French Language Section.
- Metropolitan Separate School Board operated English-language public separate schools and Les Conseil des écoles catholiques du Grand Toronto operated seven French-language Catholic schools.

In addition, the following agencies were Metro government agencies:

- Metro Toronto Zoo (now Toronto Zoo)
- Meridian Hall (formerly the O'Keefe Centre and the Hummingbird Centre)
- Exhibition Place

== See also ==
- Amalgamation of Toronto
- Greater Toronto Area
- Montreal Urban Community
- Common Sense Revolution – see entry on Bill 103
- Metro Manila – a metropolitan area that resembles it in terms of its regional status

== Notes ==
Preceded by York County (1834–1953)	Governing authority of Toronto; April 2, 1953 – December 31, 1997	Succeeded by City of Toronto (1998–present)
