= Amalgamation of Toronto =

Evolution of the current city of Toronto, Ontario

Map of Toronto with the limits of the 1974 – 1998 boroughs indicated

The amalgamation of Toronto was the creation of the city limits of Toronto, Ontario, Canada after amalgamating, annexing, and merging with surrounding municipalities since the 18th century. The most recent occurrence of amalgamation was in 1998, which dissolved the federation of Metropolitan Toronto and its constituent municipalities, and created the current "megacity" of Toronto.

== 1791–1882: Founding of settlements ==
- 1791: The townships of Etobicoke, York and Scarborough are surveyed in preparation for settlement.
- 1793: The unincorporated town of York is founded within York township on August 27. This is named in honour of Prince Frederick, Duke of York and Albany, King George III's second son. The area had previously been known as Toronto.
- 1830: The unincorporated Village of Yorkville was founded.
- 1834: York was incorporated under the city name of Toronto, coming into force on March 6. It was the largest town in Upper Canada with a population of 9,250 The city had five wards, bounded by Bathurst Street in the west, Parliament Street in the east, the lake to the south and a line analogous to Dundas Street to the north. Beyond this was an area known as the "Liberties".
- 1853: The village of Yorkville was incorporated.
- 1859: The Liberties of Toronto are abolished.
- 1876: The village of Brockton was incorporated.
- 1878: The village of Parkdale was incorporated on June 28, to go into effect January 1, 1879. Parkdale covered 487 acres (1.97 km^{2}), extending from Dufferin Street in the east to Roncesvalles Avenue in the west, from Lake Ontario in the south to the Grand Trunk Railway property and a line between Fermanagh and Wright avenues.
- 1881: The village of Weston was incorporated. The village of Brockton became the town of Brockton.

== 1883–1914: Growth, amalgamation and annexation ==
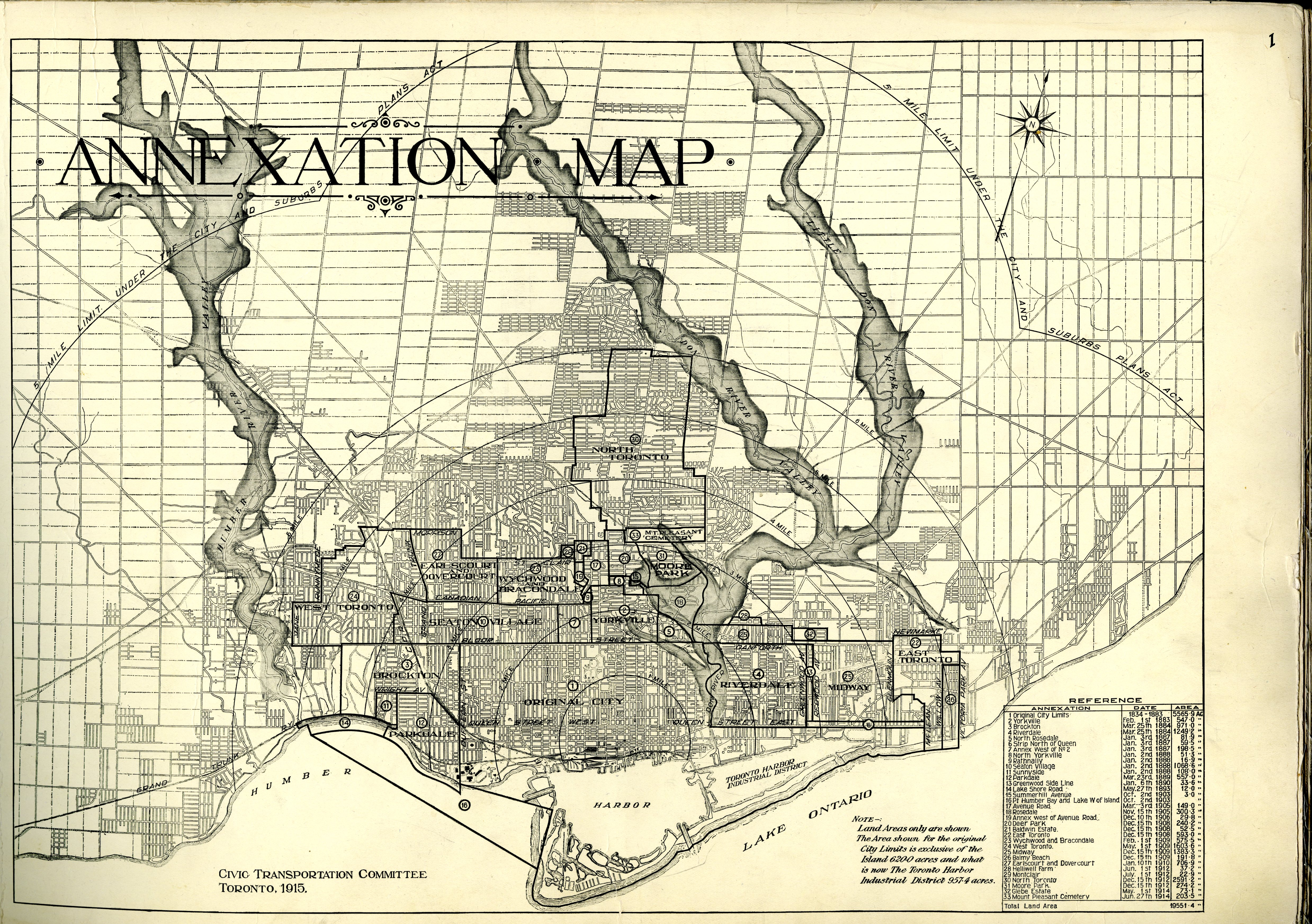
Map and timeline of Toronto annexation history

When Toronto was incorporated in 1834, the boundary of the incorporated entity (including its liberties) were what would later become Dufferin Street to the west, Bloor street to the north, and the Don Valley to the east, plus a long strip of industrial land east of the city core along the harbour. Toronto retained the same boundaries from its incorporation in 1834 for almost fifty years.

Starting in 1883, the city undertook numerous annexations of smaller municipal entities, unincorporated communities, and parcels of land in its surrounding area. Through these annexation, Toronto's almost quadrupled in geographical size to almost 80 km^{2}.

The flurry of annexations continues until 1914, after which no more expansion of Toronto would take place until 1967.

Date	Entity or area	Municipal restructuring
February 1, 1883	Yorkville (village)	Annexed by Toronto
March 25, 1884	Brockton (town)	Annexed by Toronto
March 25, 1884	Riverdale	Annexed by Toronto
1886	Parkdale	Upgraded from village to town
January 3, 1887	North Rosedale	Annexed by Toronto, formerly situated in York township
January 3, 1887	The Annex	Annexed by Toronto, formerly situated in York township
January 3, 1887	Additional strip north of Queen	Annexed by Toronto, formerly situated in York township
1887	West Toronto Junction	Incorporated as a village on land from York township (pop. 579)
January 2, 1888	North Yorkville	Annexed by Toronto, formerly situated in York township
January 2, 1888	Rathnally	Annexed by Toronto, formerly situated in York township
January 2, 1888	Seaton Village	Annexed by Toronto, formerly situated in York township
January 2, 1888	Sunnyside	Annexed by Toronto, formerly situated in York township
March 23, 1889	Parkdale (town)	Annexed by Toronto, following a vote in favour by residents on October 27 the year prior (pop. 5651)
March 23, 1889	West Toronto Junction	Upgraded from village to town, annexed neighbouring communities of Carleton and Davenport
1889	East Toronto	Incorporated as a village on land from York Township
1890	North Toronto	Incorporated as a village on land from York Township
January 6, 1890	Greenwood Side Line	Annexed by Toronto
1891	West Toronto Junction	Renamed West Toronto
May 27, 1893	Lake Shore Road	Annexed by Toronto
October 2, 1903	Summerhill Avenue	Annexed by Toronto
October 2, 1903	Port Humber Bay and Lake West of Island	Annexed by Toronto
March 3, 1905	Avenue Road	Annexed by Toronto
November 15, 1905	Rosedale	Annexed by Toronto
December 10, 1906	Annex west of Avenue Road..	Annexed by Toronto
April 14, 1908	West Toronto	Upgrade from town to city
December 15, 1908	Deer Park	Annexed by Toronto
December 15, 1908	Baldwin Estate.	Annexed by Toronto
December 15, 1908	East Toronto (village)	Annexed by Toronto
February 1, 1909	Wychwood & Bracondale	Annexed by Toronto, formerly situated in York township
May 1, 1909	West Toronto (city)	Annexed by Toronto (pop.12,000)
December 15, 1909	Midway	Annexed by Toronto, formerly situated in York township
December 15, 1909	Balmy Beach	Annexed by Toronto, formerly situated in York township
January 10, 1910	Earlscourt and Dovercourt	Annexed by Toronto, formerly situated in York Township
1911	Mimico	Incorporated as a village on land from Etobicoke Township
June 1, 1912	Helliwell Farm	Annexed by Toronto, formerly situated in York Township
July 1, 1912	Montclair	Annexed by Toronto, formerly situated in York Township
December 15, 1912	North Toronto (village)	Annexed by Toronto, Moore Park was an unincorporated communities in York township
December 15, 1912	Moore Park	Annexed by Toronto, Moore Park was an unincorporated communities in York township
April 13, 1913	Leaside	Incorporated as a village on land from York Township
1913	New Toronto	Incorporated as a village on land from Etobicoke Township
May 1, 1914	Glebe Estate	Annexed by Toronto, formerly situated in York Township
June 27, 1914	Mount Pleasant Cemetery	Annexed by Toronto, formerly situated in York Township

== 1915–1953: Growth and sprawl ==
- 1922: The township of North York was severed from the township of York.
- 1923: Forest Hill was incorporated on November 23, on land formerly in York township, which went into effect on January 1, 1924. The exclave township of East York is severed from the township of York.
- 1925: Swansea was incorporated as a village from land formerly in York township.
- 1931: Long Branch was severed from Etobicoke township to become a village.
- 1953: Metropolitan Toronto was created as a new level of government.

== 1954 federation into Metropolitan Toronto ==
In 1954, the City of Toronto was federated into a regional government known as Metropolitan Toronto. Metro Toronto was composed of the City of Toronto, the towns of New Toronto, Mimico, Weston, and Leaside; the villages of Long Branch, Swansea, and Forest Hill; and the townships of Etobicoke, York, North York, East York, and Scarborough.

The postwar boom had resulted in rapid suburban development, and it was believed that a coordinated land use strategy and shared services would provide greater efficiency for the region. The metropolitan government began to manage services that crossed municipal boundaries, including highways, water and public transit.

In Canada, the creation of municipalities falls under provincial jurisdiction. Thus it was provincial legislation, the Metropolitan Toronto Act, that created this level of government in 1953. When it took effect in 1954, the portion of York County south of Steeles Avenue, a concession road and common township boundary, was severed from the county and incorporated as the Municipality of Metropolitan Toronto. The area north of Steeles Avenue remained in York County, which ultimately became York Region in 1971.

The Metropolitan Toronto Council initially consisted of 12 councillors from Toronto (including the mayor), and one representative (usually a mayor or reeve) from each of the surrounding municipalities. Metropolitan Toronto also had planning authority over the surrounding townships such as Vaughan, Markham, and Pickering for up to 46 metres (150 ft) from a metropolitan road, although these areas did not have representation on Metro Council.

== 1967 merger ==
A round of mergers was conducted among the municipalities of Metropolitan Toronto in 1967. The seven smallest municipalities of the region were merged into their larger neighbours, resulting in a six-municipality configuration that included the old City of Toronto and the surrounding municipalities of East York, Etobicoke, North York, Scarborough and York.

- Forest Hill and Swansea were annexed by the City of Toronto,
- Leaside was merged with the Township of East York to become the Borough of East York.
- Weston was combined with the Township of York to form the Borough of York.
- The village of Long Branch and the towns of Mimico and New Toronto were dissolved, and merged with the Township of Etobicoke to form the Borough of Etobicoke.
- North York Township was promoted to the Borough of North York.
- And Scarborough was also transformed into a borough to become the Borough of Scarborough.

== 1974: Annexation of lands from Pickering into Scarborough ==
Concurrent with the creation of Durham Region, the West Rouge area of Pickering south of Twyn Rivers Drive (the original course of Sheppard Avenue) and east of Port Union Road was annexed into Scarborough. In other words, all of Pickering west of the Rouge River was annexed into Scarborough.

== 1979–1997: Boroughs promoted ==
- 1979: North York became a city.
- 1983: The boroughs of York, Etobicoke and Scarborough became cities.

== 1998 amalgamation ==
On January 1, 1998, the federation of Metropolitan Toronto and its six lower-tier constituent municipalities was dissolved by an act of the Government of Ontario, and formed into a single-tier City of Toronto (colloquially dubbed the "megacity"). The unified city became the fifth-most populous city proper in North America, behind Mexico City, New York City, Los Angeles and Chicago. In 2013, it surpassed Chicago in population.

The amalgamation was widely opposed in Toronto and the other municipalities. The amalgamation occurred despite a municipal referendum in 1997 in which over three-quarters of voters rejected amalgamation, with one-third of eligible voters participating. Mayor Mel Lastman of North York and Barbara Hall of Toronto both campaigned against the merger, as did former Toronto mayor John Sewell. Subsequently, Lastman defeated Hall in the 1997 Toronto municipal election to become the first elected mayor of the megacity. However, Canadian municipal governments legally are institutions of the provincial governments, as per Section 92(8) of the Constitution Act, 1867. and local referendums have little to no legal effect. The Harris government was thus entitled to ignore the referendum, and did so by tabling the amalgamation bill. Opposition parties in the provincial parliament engaged in a unique form of filibuster, tabling thirteen thousand amendments to the amalgamation bill, which lasted two weeks, but did not prevent passage of the bill. Each amendment named an individual street in the city, whose residents the government would be obliged to personally consult for input on the amalgamation proposal; one such amendment, granting consultation rights to residents of Cafon Court in Etobicoke, was successfully passed as not enough members of the Progressive Conservative caucus were present in the chamber to defeat it, but the government later tabled and passed another amendment to rescind the Cafon Court amendment.

The merger was proposed as a cost-saving measure and an administration improvement by the Progressive Conservative provincial government under Mike Harris. In 2007, Barry Hertz reported in the National Post that cost savings never materialized. He also noted that government staff had grown, with the city employing 4,015 more people in 2007 than it did in 1998. Before amalgamation, 73 percent of the expenses taken over by Toronto came from Metro Toronto, and were thus already integrated programs. Additionally, Ontario municipal affairs minister Al Leach touted it as a measure that would produce a stronger, more unified Toronto better equipped to compete in a global marketplace.

Canada Post mail standards do not forbid the use of former municipalities' names, relying on postal codes for accurate delivery. Although all municipalities were amalgamated, several old street names were retained, resulting in duplicate street names that are disambiguated only by referring to the former municipalities or by the postal code of a particular address. Mailing addresses in the City of Toronto continue to use the names of their former municipalities.

== See also ==
- Greater Toronto Area
- Common Sense Revolution, Bill 103
