= Paul Godfrey =

Canadian businessman and politician (born 1939)

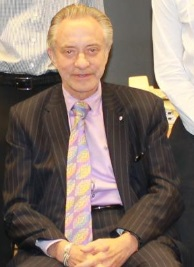

Toronto Blue Jays President and CEO
- In office 2000–2008
- Preceded by: Sam Pollock
- Succeeded by: Paul Beeston

4th Metro Toronto chairman
- In office 1973–1984
- Preceded by: Albert Campbell
- Succeeded by: Dennis Flynn

Chair of the Ontario Lottery and Gaming Corporation
- In office 2010–2013
- Preceded by: Kelly McDougald
- Succeeded by: Peter Wallace (interim)

Personal details
- Born: Paul Victor Godfrey; January 12, 1939 (age 87) Toronto, Ontario, Canada
- Party: Progressive Conservative Party of Ontario
- Education: University of Toronto
- Occupation: Media and sports executive, politician
- Profession: Chemical engineer
- Baseball career

Member of the Canadian

Baseball Hall of Fame
- Induction: 2024

Paul Victor Godfrey, CM, OOnt (born January 12, 1939) is a businessman and former Canadian politician. During his career, Godfrey was a North York alderman, Chairman of Metro Toronto, President of the Toronto Sun and head of the Toronto Blue Jays. He was instrumental in bringing the Toronto Blue Jays to Toronto and has campaigned to bring the National Football League to Toronto. He is the former president and CEO of Postmedia Network.

== Background ==
Born in Toronto, Ontario, Godfrey grew up in a working class Jewish family near the Kensington Market neighbourhood of Toronto, the son of Bess (Greenbaum) and Philip Godfrey.

He later moved to the Bathurst and Lawrence area of Toronto.

He trained as a chemical engineer.

In 1999, he was made a Member of the Order of Canada. In 2010, he was appointed to the Order of Ontario.

== Politics ==
He entered politics as an alderman in North York in 1964, serving until 1973. In 1970, he was appointed to North York's Board of Control to fill a vacancy caused by the death of Controller John Booth. He also joined Metropolitan Toronto Council for the first time, by virtue of being a Controller. He was re-elected to the Board of Control in 1969. In 1973, he became Chairman of Metropolitan Toronto succeeding Albert Campbell, and served until 1984. Godfrey was succeeded by Dennis Flynn.

In 1985, it was reported Godfrey had joined the new Ontario Premier Frank Miller's informal "kitchen cabinet", a group which met on Thursday mornings at the Sutton Place Hotel to discuss issues of the day during breakfast. This was similar to a "breakfast club" set up by the previous premier, Bill Davis, but with a more right-wing bent.

Godfrey was chair of the Ontario Lottery and Gaming Corporation from 2009 until he was fired on May 16, 2013, by Premier Kathleen Wynne.

During the Ontario PC Party of Ontario's 2015 leadership race, Godfrey endorsed Barrie MP Patrick Brown for leader.

== Media ==
In 1984, after he left politics he joined the Toronto Sun as publisher and CEO. In 1991 he succeeded founder Douglas Creighton as president and chief operating officer of Toronto Sun Publishing. In 1992 he became CEO of Toronto Sun Publishing replacing founder Doug Creighton. Creighton was forced to resign by the board of directors and the parent company, Maclean Hunter. In 1996, Godfrey led a successful attempt by Sun management to buy back control, allowing it to become an independent entity once again. Two years later, Godfrey organized a deal with Conrad Black to swap the Financial Post with four daily newspapers in southwestern Ontario. These included the Hamilton Spectator, Kitchener-Waterloo Record, Guelph Mercury, and Cambridge Reporter. In October 1998, Sun Media was approached by Torstar Corporation in an unsolicited takeover bid for $748 million. Godfrey said he was surprised by the move. Two months later Quebecor Media Inc. made a higher and eventually more successful bid for a reported $983 million. Godfrey was a key figure in seeking out Quebecor as an alternative buyer. After the sale, Quebecor, initially heralded as a "white knight" buyer, forced Godfrey to cut 180 jobs from his newspaper. In November 2000, Godfrey announced that he was stepping down as CEO of Sun Media. There was some speculation that he was uncomfortable while under the control of Quebecor. He remained on the board of Sun Media.

He had been named president and CEO of The National Post, starting in 2009. He was the president and CEO of Postmedia Network, starting July 13, 2010. He took a $900,000 bonus during a time Postmedia laid off staff company-wide. Godfrey then stepped down as president and CEO of Postmedia in 2019; he remains as executive chairman of the company.

== SkyDome ==
In 1984 he was appointed to the board of a new crown agency called the Stadium Corporation of Ontario along with Larry Grossman and Hugh Macaulay. Its mandate was to choose the location and design for a new domed stadium that would eventually become SkyDome. Godfrey stayed on the board until February 1989 when he resigned. He had been accused of being in a conflict of interest because of his involvement with a group lobbying for an NFL franchise in Toronto. Godfrey denied that there was any conflict and also denied that this had anything to do with his resignation. However, Godfrey remained on the board of directors of the Stadium Corporation, a separate entity, until 1998 when he resigned shortly before SkyDome filed for bankruptcy. He said his resignation would have no effect on the process. Godfrey said "... It didn't make much sense to me to have separate directors and shareholder meetings when the shareholders should be making all the decisions ... My resignation just streamlines the process."

== Blue Jays ==
On 1 September 2000, Godfrey became president and CEO of the Toronto Blue Jays baseball club when Rogers Communications bought the baseball club. He stepped down as president on September 22, 2008, after eight years. During his tenure, the team payroll increased from US $46 million to US $98 million. While the Blue Jays posted four out of eight seasons better than .500, they achieved no better than second place in the American League East division. In 2004, the Blue Jays purchased SkyDome for $25 million, far below its original construction cost of $650 million. The purchase gave Godfrey more latitude in controlling the total game experience.

== Ontario Lottery and Gaming Corporation ==
Godfrey was announced as the chair of the Ontario Lottery and Gaming Corporation, a role in which he served until being dismissed in 2013.

== Other positions ==
Godfrey served on the board of directors of the now defunct CanWest Global Communications, and as a director of RioCan Real Estate Investment Trust, CargoJet Income Fund and Astral.
