= Fred Gardiner =

Canadian politician (1895–1983)

Fred Gardiner QC

1st Chairman of the Municipality of Metropolitan Toronto
- In office 1953–1961
- Preceded by: New position
- Succeeded by: William R. Allen

Personal details
- Born: Frederick Goldwin Gardiner; January 21, 1895 Toronto, Ontario
- Died: August 21, 1983 (aged 88) Toronto, Ontario

Frederick Goldwin Gardiner (January 21, 1895 – August 21, 1983) was a Canadian politician, lawyer and businessman who served as the first chairman of Metropolitan Toronto from 1953 to 1961. As Metro Chairman, Gardiner, nicknamed "Big Daddy," was a staunch advocate of growth and expansion and was responsible for many capital works projects, including the Gardiner Expressway (named for him) and the Don Valley Parkway.

Gardiner, after graduating first in his law class, became a well-known criminal lawyer. He invested in various businesses, including consumer credit, sawmills, manufacturing and mining. At one time, he was the largest shareholder in the Toronto-Dominion Bank.

Gardiner was a prominent member of the Progressive Conservative Party of Canada in both federal and provincial politics, organized conventions and developed policy in the 1930s and 1940s. He was instrumental in the updating of the Conservative Party, as it was then known, to the Progressive Conservative Party to acknowledge its change in policy to incorporate progressive values. He was a close adviser to Ontario PC Premiers George Drew and Leslie Frost.

== Early life ==
Fred Gardiner was born on January 21, 1895, in Toronto, one of three children born to David and Victoria Gardiner, the others being Myrtle and Samuel. David Gardiner was born in October 1854 in County Monaghan, Ireland, one of ten children. David emigrated to Toronto in 1874 and worked as a labourer, then as a carpenter, and eventually as an attendant at the Toronto Asylum for the Insane and a longer-term position as a guard at the Central Prison on Strachan Avenue. While working at the Asylum, he met Victoria Robertson from Port Hope, Ontario. The two married in April 1888. Son Samuel was born in 1892, Fred in 1895 and Myrtle in 1898. The family lived on Arthur Street (now Dundas Street West), near Euclid Street, in the west-end of Toronto before it settled at 199½ Euclid in 1911.

As a child, Fred, known as Ted, assisted his father, who was a landlord for several properties in the Arthur-Euclid area. Fred also delivered telegrams by bicycle on holidays and weekends. Fred attended Grace Street School, (where he had to repeat fourth grade) until 1909 when he started to attend Parkdale Collegiate Institute on Jameson Avenue. It was in the third year at Parkdale that Gardiner started to develop his competitiveness, a trait he would use for material gain and political ends later in life.

In 1911, Gardiner first became involved in politics. His father, a member of the Loyal Orange Lodge, was also a member of the Conservative Party. Fred first helped out on a campaign for the board of education. In December 1911, he worked on the campaign for E. W. J. Owens in the provincial election for the riding of Toronto South.

In 1913, Gardiner entered the University of Toronto, in general arts, transferring in the second year to honours political science. Gardiner paid for his tuition out of his own savings. Gardiner joined the varsity rugby team in 1914, a year that the team won the national championship. Gardiner had to drop out of the varsity team when he did not have enough money for the fees, and his father refused to pay. Gardiner worked hard at his studies and won the political economy department's Alexander Mackenzie Medal in 1916.

After his third year, Gardiner enlisted in the militia in the spring of 1916. He signed on with the Depot Regiment of the Canadian Mounted Rifles. The regiment was disbanded in 1917, but Gardiner was transferred to an infantry battalion in the Canadian Expeditionary Force. He took an officer's course at Reading University and was assigned as an officer with the Royal Flying Corps, serving as a flight instructor. Gardiner saw action only after September 1918, when he piloted a Handley-Page night bomber on several missions.

While serving in the army, Gardiner developed a lifelong interest in gambling and became proficient at cards and dice. He played poker on the return voyage after the war and doubled his $1,500 stake. He also developed a taste for Scotch whisky.

Because of his service in the war, Gardiner was given an honours degree by the University, and he did not have to finish his fourth year of studies. Gardiner enrolled at Osgoode Hall in law, where returning soldiers could skip the first year, and take the second year in one summer semester. Gardiner was not impeded by the accelerated schedule, and he placed first in the class of 1920. He received the Chancellor Van Koughnet scholarship, a $400 cash prize and the Law Society's gold medal. Gardiner treasured the gold medal, and kept it on his desk for the length of his career.

Gardiner used most of his $400 prize to buy an engagement ring for Audrey Seaman, a railway clerk and daughter of the proprietor of a prosperous flooring company. Gardiner had known her since 1913. They married in October 1921. They had two children, William Warren and Anne. Anne would later marry a law partner of Gardiner's, J. B. Conlin.

== Early career ==
Gardiner started his law career with Crooks, Roebuck and Parkinson. Gardiner turned down a partnership with the firm because Arthur Roebuck (a future attorney-general of Ontario) was too liberal even though Roebuck took it as a personal slight. Gardiner left the practice in 1921 and joined Commercial Credit Company of Canada, as a legal associate. In 1923, Gardiner returned to law practice partnering with Harry Parkinson. The firm added H. Fred Parkinson and Donald H. Rowan to become the firm of Parkinson, Gardiner and Willis. Gardiner took criminal cases, litigation and continued to handle legal work with Commercial Credit. Gardiner attained the title of King's Counsel in 1938.

By 1945, Gardiner was considered one of the top half-dozen trial lawyers in the province and he commanded high fees. Gardiner was perceived as a stubborn and sometimes acid-tongued negotiator, and not a man to be crossed lightly as an opponent. Gardiner worked hard at research and marshalled detailed evidence with self-assurance.

Gardiner started investing in 1925, starting with $10,000, invested in industrial and mining stocks. He sold out in 1929 in time to avoid the crash and held on only to shares of Noranda Mines. After the crash, he invested all of his capital in the Bank of Toronto, which became through merger today's Toronto-Dominion Bank. Gardiner also accepted stocks as payment for his legal fees and he amassed investments in a diverse number of companies. He was involved in real estate, metal stamping, manufacturing, forest products, aluminum products, and car rentals. He partnered with Sam Steinberg in Drayton Motors, a large used car dealership. He also partnered with Steinberg in Sage Enterprises, managing hotels.

Gardiner began chartering aircraft for weekends of fishing. He continued to gamble, losing $6,000 in one night in the late 1930s. Gardiner's drinking increased until 1940, when Audrey convinced him to give it up. He did not drink again until 1949, and when he started, he drank more moderately. Gardiner also lessened his gambling and took up golf. He also developed an interest in growing red roses, for which he won horticultural prizes. He also assembled a collection of landscape and portrait paintings, and collected modern and antique silver artifacts.

== Entry to politics ==
It was after the provincial election of 1934, when the Conservatives were defeated, that Gardiner started to become more involved in politics in the Conservative party, and politics in Forest Hill, then a small and affluent suburb of Toronto. He joined the Conservative Businessman's Association in 1934. He first ran for deputy reeve of Forest Hill Village council in 1935. In his first campaign he spent $800, when candidates normally spent $200. He went door-to-door canvassing and received the endorsement of past reeve Andrew Hazlett. A Jewish car dealer named Ben Sadowski, whom Gardiner had befriended at Parkdale and intervened in a fight, canvassed for Gardiner among Jewish families of the area. Gardiner won the post by 1,211 to his challenger's 919 votes. Gardiner would go on to serve as reeve of the Village of Forest Hill for twelve years. In 1946, his final year as reeve, Gardiner was also Warden of the County of York, a title similar in some respects to his later chairmanship of Metropolitan Toronto.

In 1936, Gardiner started getting more involved in Conservative politics. He backed W. Earl Rowe for Conservative leader of Ontario. Rowe would lose the 1937 election to Mitchell Hepburn, and eventually give up the post in 1938. Gardiner's outward role in the election was to give speeches. One of Gardiner's first speeches was a rally for Leslie Frost, the older brother of Cecil Frost, who had organized the 1937 campaign. Cecil Frost and Gardiner would become the president and first vice-president, respectively, of the party in 1938. Gardiner, who had decided not to run for provincial politics in 1938, also chose not to run for federal politics in the 1939 federal election although the South York nomination was his if he had wanted it. Gardiner chose not to run because he thought the Conservatives would remain in opposition, and he would "sit in the back row of the Commons and wait for the boss to tell me when to make a speech."

Gardiner's largest role in the Conservative Party would be in reforming the party's policies to be more progressive. Gardiner was instrumental in the 1942 Port Hope policy conference, chairing the discussions of the labour committee. Gardiner came out in favour of legal safeguards for collective bargaining and uniform and general standards in wages and working conditions, including support for a 'closed shop' in collective agreements. The Port Hope policies were adopted at the Winnipeg national leadership convention in Winnipeg in December 1942, which gave the party a systematically-drafted platform. Gardiner again chaired the labour committee and acted in favour of reformed social security, as lieutenant of the resolution and policy committee. At the convention, the party would choose John Bracken as leader, and change its name to the Progressive Conservative Party.

Gardiner would continue his work inside the party for the rest of the 1940s and chaired the resolution and policy committee himself at the 1948 federal leadership convention. Gardiner turned down several chances to run provincially and federally. Gardiner chose instead to concentrate on his own career in business: "There is nothing you can do in politics that makes the cash register ring." Gardiner was even considered to run for the leadership of the Ontario Progressive Conservative Party (and therefore provincial premier) in 1948 but chose to support Leslie Frost instead. Gardiner would become one of Frost's closest political confidantes and advisers.

== Metropolitan Toronto ==
By the 1940s, urban development had expanded beyond the borders of the City of Toronto. Planning studies anticipated that the townships and villages surrounding Toronto would be the scene of any future growth. However, spending to build any capital projects was limited by the lack of capital borrowing ability of the suburbs. The trunk sewers and sewage treatment plant for the Don Mills development was financed by its developer, E. P. Taylor, when North York Township could not. Planning boards, including the Toronto and Suburban Planning Board of which Gardiner was chairman, proposed several projects, one being the Spadina Road Extension, which were rejected by the local governments.

The Ontario government, in concert with the City of Toronto, and Gardiner's Planning Board, proposed an amalgamated city to the Ontario Municipal Board (OMB) to overcome the roadblocks in building capital projects and facilitate growth. The OMB deliberated over the plan from 1951 until 1953, when it proposed a two-tier federal government named 'Metropolitan Toronto'. The Frost government approved the idea and passed it in April 1953, naming Gardiner the first chairman of the Metropolitan Council, made up equally of city and suburban representatives. Gardiner was also the chief administrative officer of the Metro Toronto organization. The two-tier plan was not new, it had been first proposed in 1934.

The Metro Toronto federation was charged with the responsibility of providing the thirteen municipalities with those services which were metropolitan in nature, while those services which were local in nature were to be left to the thirteen local municipalities. Metro was responsible for administration of justice, arterial roads, metropolitan parks, metropolitan planning, public education, public transportation, sewage treatment and water facilities and some housing activities and some social services. Metro Toronto, which now had the credit of all of the municipalities could finance capital projects with bonds.

Gardiner was chairman from 1953 until the end of 1961, and he deeply immersed himself in the job. He would be driven from home at 9:00 a.m. and return home some twelve hours later. Gardiner worked on weekends and late at night. During his nine years as chairman, he took only two summer vacations and four mid-winter holidays. On weekends, he would tour Metro Toronto public works projects, rapid transit facilities, urban renewal sites and tracts of suburban housing. The grueling routine took a toll on his health. Gardiner was hospitalized in March 1958 with arthritis and intestinal inflammation. Gardiner gave up his law practice, giving his cases to others and he parted company with long-time partners Harry Parkinson and Harry Willis.

During Gardiner's tenure, Metro Toronto grew to 1.6 million people and Metro government was busy. To provide the population with water, Metro built water filtration and sewage treatment plants and laid hundreds of miles of subterranean pipes. Metro invested $60 million, which doubled the supply of water to the entire region. A Metro Parks Department was created. Amongst the 3,500 acres (14 km^{2}) of natural parkland developed by Metro was the 600-acre (2.4 km^{2}) Toronto Islands Park. Two major highways, the Lakeshore Expressway, renamed the Frederick G. Gardiner Expressway and the Don Valley Parkway were started. The Bloor-Danforth and University subway lines were started. Metro built homes for the aged, and some for families with children. Metro formed the Metropolitan Toronto School Board and invested $230 million in new schools. The capital works program cost about $1 billion, at the rate of about $100 million a year, over the ten years.

As Metro Chairman, Gardiner dominated the Metro Council. Although he was allowed to vote only to break tie votes, Gardiner made his voting preference known before votes. During Gardiner's tenure, over 11,539 votes, Council voted over 80% in agreement with Gardiner's position. Gardiner voted only eight times.

Gardiner ruled Council meetings strictly. He controlled procedural questions strictly, which challenged dissident members to appeal his decisions, which no-one was able to do throughout his term. Members were scolded for talking inaudibly. Meetings went through agenda items quickly. Often, he would not pause to ask for dissenting votes. Leslie Frost commended his performance in 1956 by that stating that the success of Metro to date "has been very largely dependent upon your own personality." Nathan Phillips described his style: "When he really wanted something, he just came and beat it out of you." Philip Givens, who was on several occasions brought to tears, described Gardiner's temper; "He scared the hell out of you. If he cut you up, he did it thoroughly. He eviscerated you, he left your entrails all over the floor."

Gardiner was a voting member of all four policy committees. The committees would do the early work of working through proposals preparing them for council. Gardiner prided himself on his work ethic, the same style that he had used since his days at high school.:"I was not going to change my way of proceeding. It was more necessary than ever. My diagnosis was that if I was going to get anywhere I had to know more about any given subject than any individual councillor, and more about metropolitan business as than all the members of council combined." Gardiner would wait to speak on important resolutions after others had spoken. When a close vote was anticipated, Gardiner went around the council table and rebutted objections one by one.

Gardiner was also known for controlling consideration of issues until the political time was right. The Bloor-Danforth subway was proposed by the city in 1956, but Gardiner stalled it until 1958 by starting three successive studies. When it reached the council, Gardiner gave it his full support, and he used tactics to build council support by the use of preliminary and tentative council commitments: "Once you get those bulldozers in the ground, it is pretty hard to get them out."

One area of capital projects that was especially keen to Gardiner's interest was Metro's expressway program. Gardiner won executive approval for the drawing up of plans for the Lakeshore Expressway in July 1953. The route through the central section was controversial, especially around Fort York, which he proposed moving, but Gardiner was successful in convincing Council to approve the less-controversial east and west sections first. With both ends built, the central section was inevitable.

Gardiner used similar methods to push the Don Valley Parkway project along. Engineers were interested in studying alternate routes, which Gardiner prevented: "councillors could not afford to stop, look and listen. Either the project was started forthwith, or the whole east end of the city will be on our shoulders like three tons of bricks." Metro executive committee approved the preliminary plans one month later. When the plans were in draft, he secured section-by-section approval. The Parkway project went from proposal to approved policy in about two years, from January 1955 until February 1957.

The routes of the Lakeshore Expressway and the Don Valley Parkway were mostly uncontentious, but the other parts of the expressway program went through developed areas and sure to be controversial. In 1954, Gardiner deferred the extension of the lakeshore expressway to the east, and the Crosstown expressway was deferred in 1955. The Spadina Expressway was similarly shelved in 1956. While all of the expressways were part of the official transportation plan in 1959, only the Spadina Expressway had been approved when he left office in 1961. The Spadina Expressway was formally approved at the final meeting Gardiner chaired, and the Cross-town deferred again.

However, Gardiner also saw the value of public transit. At the 1956 inaugural meeting of Metro Council, Gardiner stated that "it is a snare and a delusion to spend millions on expressways in the belief that they alone will solve traffic problems." He also stated that "the irresistible fact is, you simply cannot provide sufficient highways and parking space to accommodate every person who desires to drive his car downtown." He also estimated that $1 in expenditure on transit was worth $5 spent on arterial highways and parking spaces.

Metro Toronto greatly expanded the ability to finance capital works projects and Gardiner followed three principles in the allocation of money. Gardiner chose under his chairmanship to negotiate the amount of money to go to local municipalities but did not interfere in the actual ways that the local municipalities spent the money. He also pursued a policy of balance between the city and the suburbs. He pushed for the Bloor-Danforth subway, located mostly in the City, but he also pushed for a uniform water rate, a policy that favoured the suburbs. His third principle was to limit demand. In 1953, he claimed that "there was nothing we could not afford", but in 1954, he cautioned against the belief that "Metro has more money in the aggregate than we all had individually." Later in his term, Gardiner named $100 million as the upper limit of annual capital borrowing. He held onto the total figure since "it was a nice round number" until 1961, when he agreed to a five per-cent increase.

== Later life ==
Gardiner left City Hall in the second week of January 1962. He returned to his law practice, but he did not take on many law cases. He also became a director of the Toronto Dominion Bank; his 100,000 shares made him the largest shareholder in the bank. He also became a director of eleven other corporations. He became involved in several land quarry businesses. He retained one public office: he became Commissioner of Toronto Hydro in 1965 and retired in 1979. He was also a member of the board of governors of York University, to which he donated $50,000. He served as vice-president of the Canadian National Exhibition

Gardiner had retired from the Metro Chairmanship because of his ill health, particularly arthritis. He underwent surgery for his conditions in 1962. In 1967, he suffered as stroke, which caused slurring of his speech and problems with memory retention. He received an artificial hip in 1971, however the operation was not a success. Gardiner had to use a wheelchair for mobility. Then, Gardiner became less involved in business and had no directorships by 1975. He retired as partner from his law practice, although he kept an honorary title and small office.

After 18 months of illness related to a stroke and arthritis, Gardiner died on August 21, 1983. Gardiner was praised by past and present political colleagues. Philip Givens considered Gardiner the "catalyst for it all, the transition that transformed Metro into one of the great cities of the world." Allan Lamport praised him for his ability to put in long hours on the job. Paul Godfrey considered Gardiner his idol, admiring his ability to "solve political problems and bring people together". Bill Davis praised Gardiner for his "remarkable contributions and selfless service." Art Eggleton said that "a towering giant" was lost from the political scene. Gardiner is buried at Mount Pleasant Cemetery in Toronto, Ontario.

The opening day of the fifty-ninth year of The Empire Club of Canada was designated "Frederick G. Gardiner Day" in honour of a life member of the club, who announced his retirement as Chairman of the Municipality of Metro Toronto.

Gardiner's services to the community in the field of politics and other areas of civic welfare were recognized by the University of Toronto, when he was granted the degree of Doctor of Laws honoris causa.

== See also ==
- Robert Moses
- Spadina Expressway, a roadway he had suggested in the 1940s as a member of the Toronto and Suburban Planning Board
