= Forest Hill, Toronto =

Forest Hill
- Neighbourhood
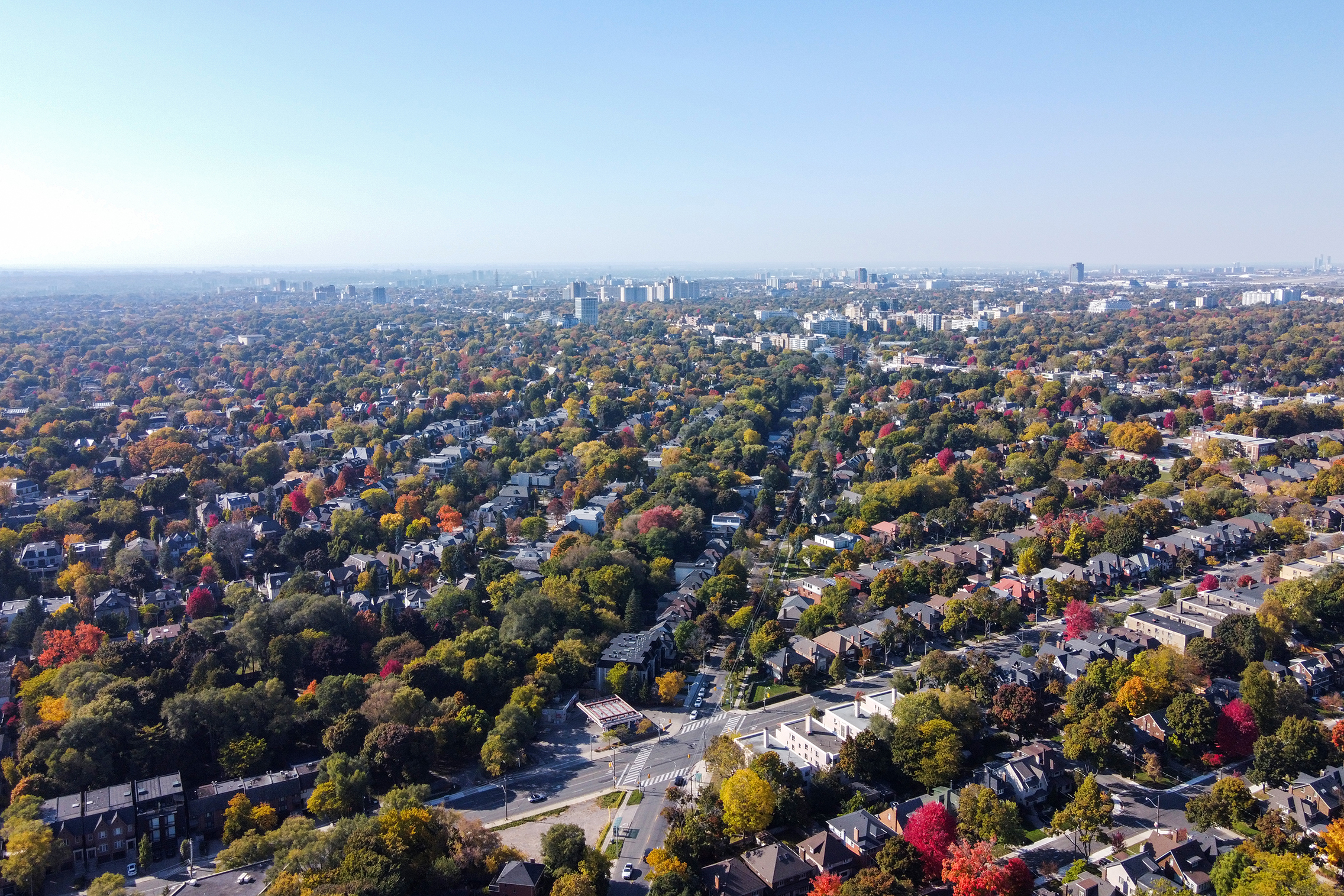
- View of Forest Hill to the west of Avenue Road

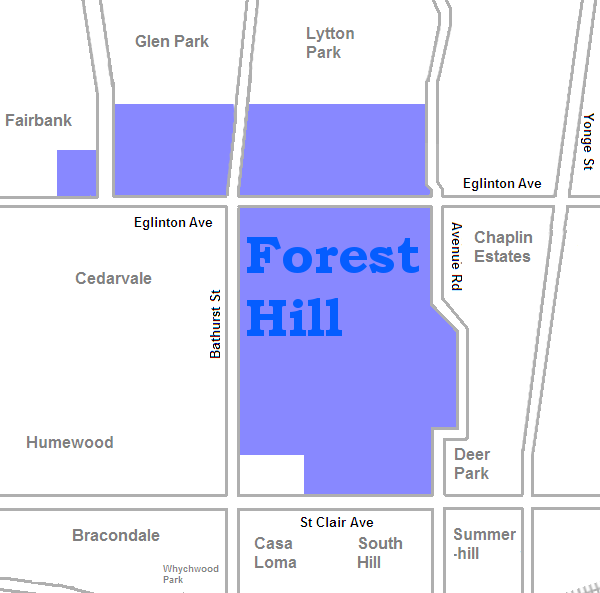

- Location within Toronto
- Coordinates: 43°41′55″N 79°25′21″W
- Country: Canada
- Province: Ontario
- City: Toronto
- Incorporated: 1923 (Village)

Population (2021)
  - Total: 23,155

Forest Hill is a neighbourhood and former village in Midtown Toronto, Ontario, Canada, located north of Downtown Toronto. The village was amalgamated into Toronto in 1967 and the area has retained its name as a neighbourhood. Along with other neighbourhoods such as Rosedale and The Bridle Path, it is one of Toronto's wealthiest neighbourhoods, with an average income, among income recipients 15 or older in private households, of $157,600 in Forest Hill South and $89,700 in Forest Hill North, compared to the $59,250 average income in Toronto's Census Metropolitan Area and $54,450 in Canada as a whole.

== History ==
Federal census population history of Forest Hill
Year	Pop.	±%
1931	5,207	—
1941	11,757	+125.8%
1951	15,305	+30.2%
1956	19,480	+27.3%
1961	20,489	+5.2%
1966	23,135	+12.9%
Source: Statistics Canada

Forest Hill was originally incorporated as a village in 1923, and later amalgamated by the province into the City of Toronto in 1967, along with the Village of Swansea. The village was named after the summer home of John Wickson, the father of Toronto architect Frank Wickson; previously, it had been known as Spadina Heights (a name that continued to be applied to the neighbourhood into the twentieth century). Spadina Heights is a derivative of the First Nations (namely Ojibwe) word ishapadenah, meaning a hill or sudden rise in land. Rather than electing a mayor as in a city, the leading municipal official was the reeve of the village.

In the late 1960s, the City of Toronto planned to construct a highway that would run from Highway 401 to downtown Toronto via the Cedarvale Ravine and Spadina Road. Forest Hill and the Annex would be bisected by the proposed route, and numerous local houses would be sacrificed for the new expressway. This prompted local residents to rise to protest and raise the awareness of the greater public.

On March 1, 1971 Bill Davis replaced John Robarts as head of the ruling Progressive Conservative Party of Ontario. Public opinion was divided and Davis was facing a provincial election in the fall. While the Tories held 12 of the 25 seats in Metro Toronto the expressway threatened to physically divide influential downtown ridings that were key to Tory support. The Liberals, who supported the expressway, had 7 Metro seats. The NDP, who opposed, had 6. Though Toronto Metro Council was largely in favor of continuing the expressway, by the end of May Davis, accepting the argument that Spadina would increase rather than decrease traffic congestion and pollution, made his decision to cancel it, while also undercutting a major NDP issue, and on June 3rd he rose in the legislature to make the announcement.

The Forest Hill War Memorial was erected by Page and Steele Architects at Eglinton Avenue and Vesta Road in 1980, in memory of those who lost their lives in the First and Second World Wars.

When the Village was amalgamated into the City of Toronto, the agreement granted local residents the right to have their garbage picked up from their doorstep rather than from the curb. It wasn't until 1993 that the public learned that this extra service cost $420,000 a year and was paid for by the municipal government. This time, the public opinion of other Torontonians forced the city to discontinue this favour to Forest Hill residents.

The neighbourhood's original boundaries were Bathurst Street to the west, Upper Canada College to the east, Eglinton Avenue to the north, and Lonsdale Road and a portion of Montclair Avenue to the south (the original boundaries of School Section 30). Neighbourhoods north of Eglinton are sometimes though not unanimously regarded as Forest Hill. In 1999 Robert Fulford compared Forest Hill to Rosedale, the other traditional home of Toronto's elite: "While Rosedale has remained stable for half a century, Forest Hill's prestige has been growing steadily. There's a key tonal difference in the architecture of the two places: where big Rosedale houses shout 'history,' big Forest Hill houses shout 'grandeur.' More than any other district in the central city, Forest Hill has become the site of spectacular new 'neo-traditional' homes built on a grand scale, usually with lawns to match."

== Location ==
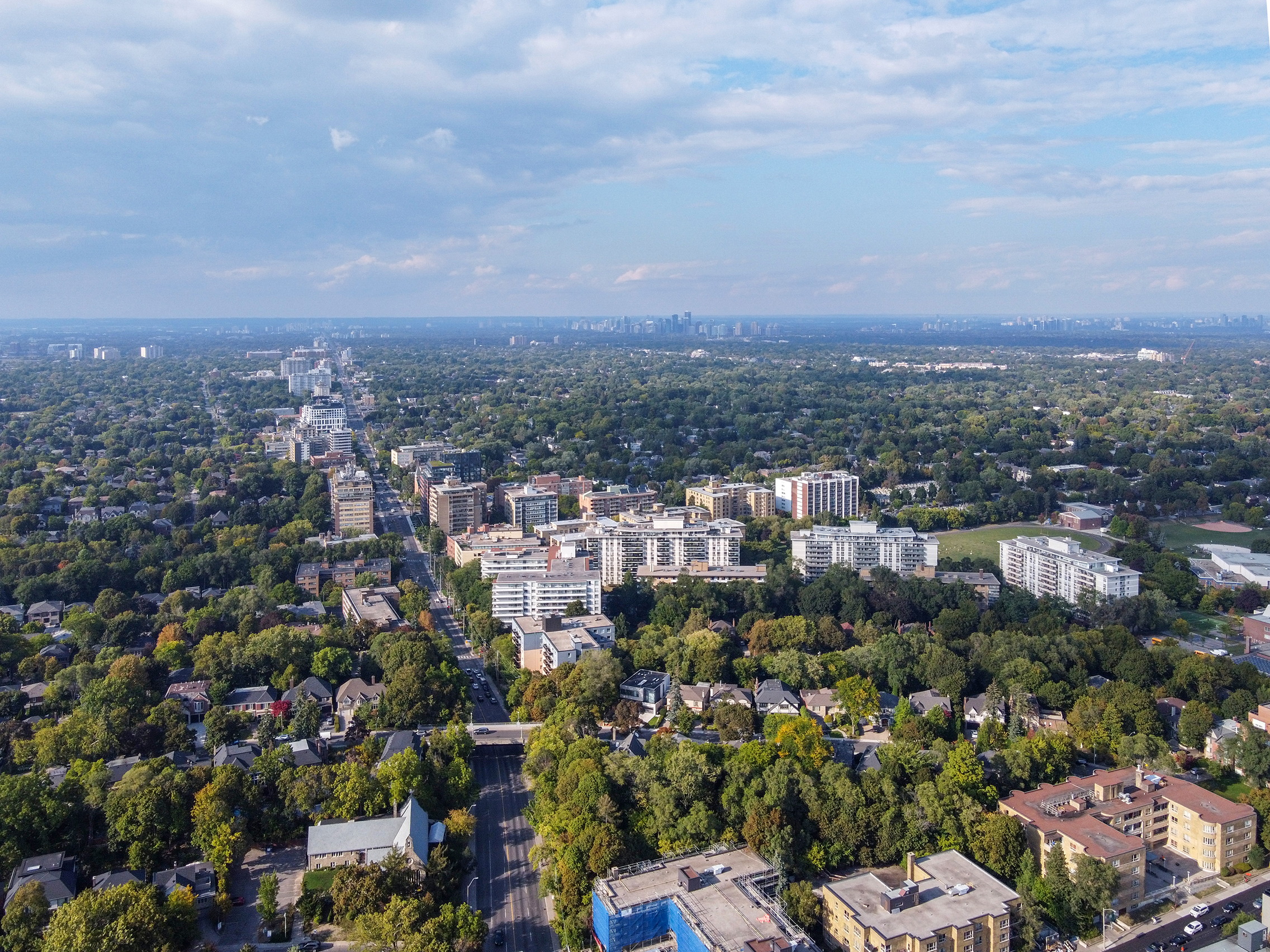
Forest Hill has extensive residential development, including apartments

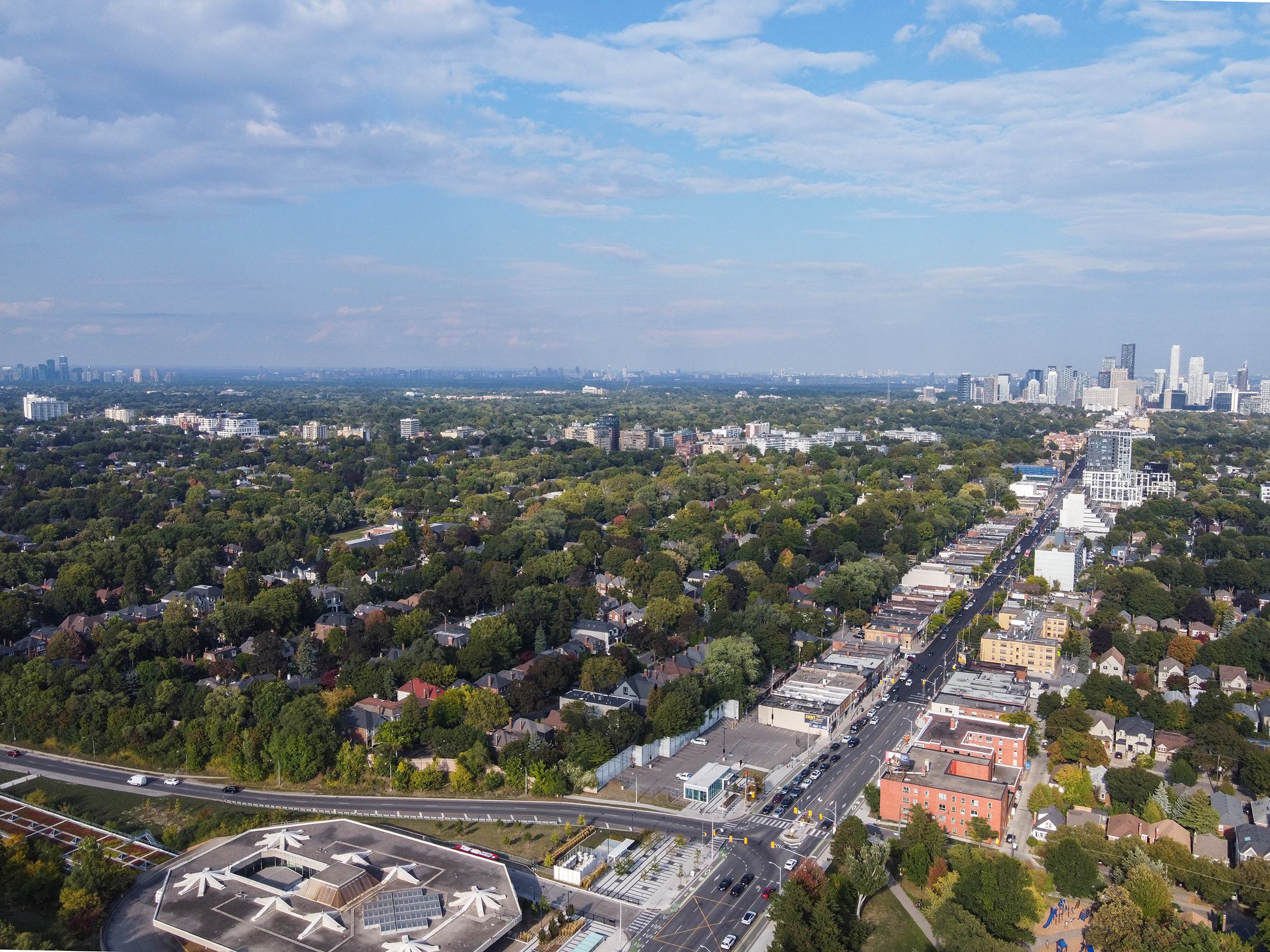
Forest Hill North near Eglinton Avenue

Currently, for the purposes of social policy analysis and research, the City of Toronto's Social Development, Finance & Administration division separates Forest Hill into two neighbourhoods – Forest Hill North and Forest Hill South.

Forest Hill Village extends roughly from Briar Hill Avenue in the north (the Upper Village, officially part of Forest Hill North) to Heath Street in the south (the Lower Village, officially the major part of Forest Hill South along Spadina Road between Bathurst Street/Cedarvale Ravine (whichever is further east) and Avenue Road. The designations Upper and Lower are based on height of land and not on positions on a map or along a watercourse.

The Upper Village was slower to develop because it had previously been occupied by the old Belt Line Railway, and then by industry. Its houses were built mostly in the 1940s and 1950s. Many homes have been or are being significantly renovated, with some being torn down completely to make way for large 'neo-classical' homes.

Forest Hill North extends from Briar Hill Avenue in the north to Eglinton Avenue West in the south, and from Latimer Avenue in the east to Allen Road and Marlee Avenue in the north-west and south-west, respectively. For administrative purposes, Forest Hill North is Toronto neighbourhood #102.

As the name would imply, Forest Hill South (designated as Toronto neighbourhood #101) is directly south of Forest Hill North. It extends from Eglinton Avenue West in the north to Tichester Road in the south, and from Bathurst Street in the west to Elmsthorpe Road in the northeast and Avenue Road and Oriole Parkway in the east. There is an additional stretch of Forest Hill South between Bathurst Street and Spadina Road, north of Lonsdale Road. South Hill is located to the south of Forest Hill South.

Politically, the residents of Forest Hill North are represented either in the Eglinton-Lawrence ward or in the St. Paul's (west) ward. Meanwhile, Forest Hill South is neighbourhood #101. Similarly, the residents of Forest Hill South are represented in either the St. Paul's (west) ward or the St. Paul's (east) ward.

== Character ==
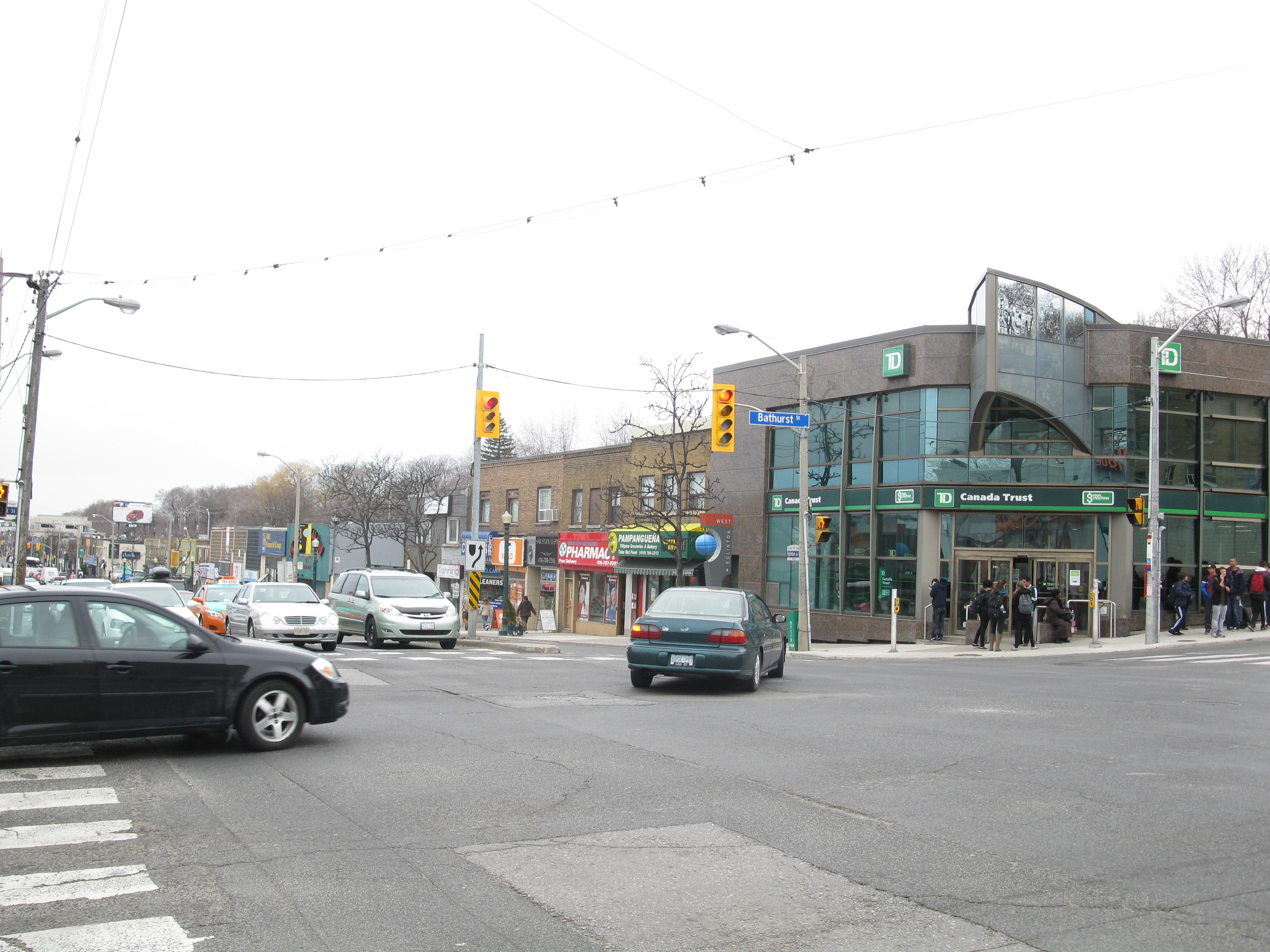
The intersection of Bathurst Street and Eglinton Avenue

Lower Forest Hill is a tree lined upscale neighbourhood comparable to nearby Rosedale. According to its older building codes in the 1920s to 1930s, all homes had to be designed by an architect and have a tree in the front yard. The result was a multitude of well manicured brick and mason mansions. At Spadina Road and Lonsdale Avenue is Forest Hill Village, a small shopping district containing boutique shops, a small grocery, banking and other services. Two elite private boarding schools, The Bishop Strachan School for girls and Upper Canada College for boys can be found nearby. To the west along Lonsdale and Heath Street there are several luxury condo buildings and to the north along Eglinton there is a group of more modest co-op apartments.

The Loblaws grocery at Bathurst Street and St Clair Ave West is accessible to the subway, St Clair West Station however the walking distance (a few hundred meters) from the station to the Bathurst Street bus stop makes this one of the most inconvenient transfers in the city.

The more northerly Upper Forest Hill homes, built in the 40s and 50s are smaller but have a similar lot sizes. This area is dominated by Tudor and Georgian styles, but the architectural styles range from French Colonial with terra cotta tiles to English country manors with sweeping lawns. Luxurious details such as sculpture gardens, porte-cochères, and imposing gated entrances are quite widespread. For example, Old Forest Hill Road hosts "a style of domestic architecture that's often been described as Stockbroker Baronial".

The stretch along Eglinton from Bathurst to the Spadina Expressway contains a wide variety of small shops, restaurants, food stores and other services.

=== Housing ===
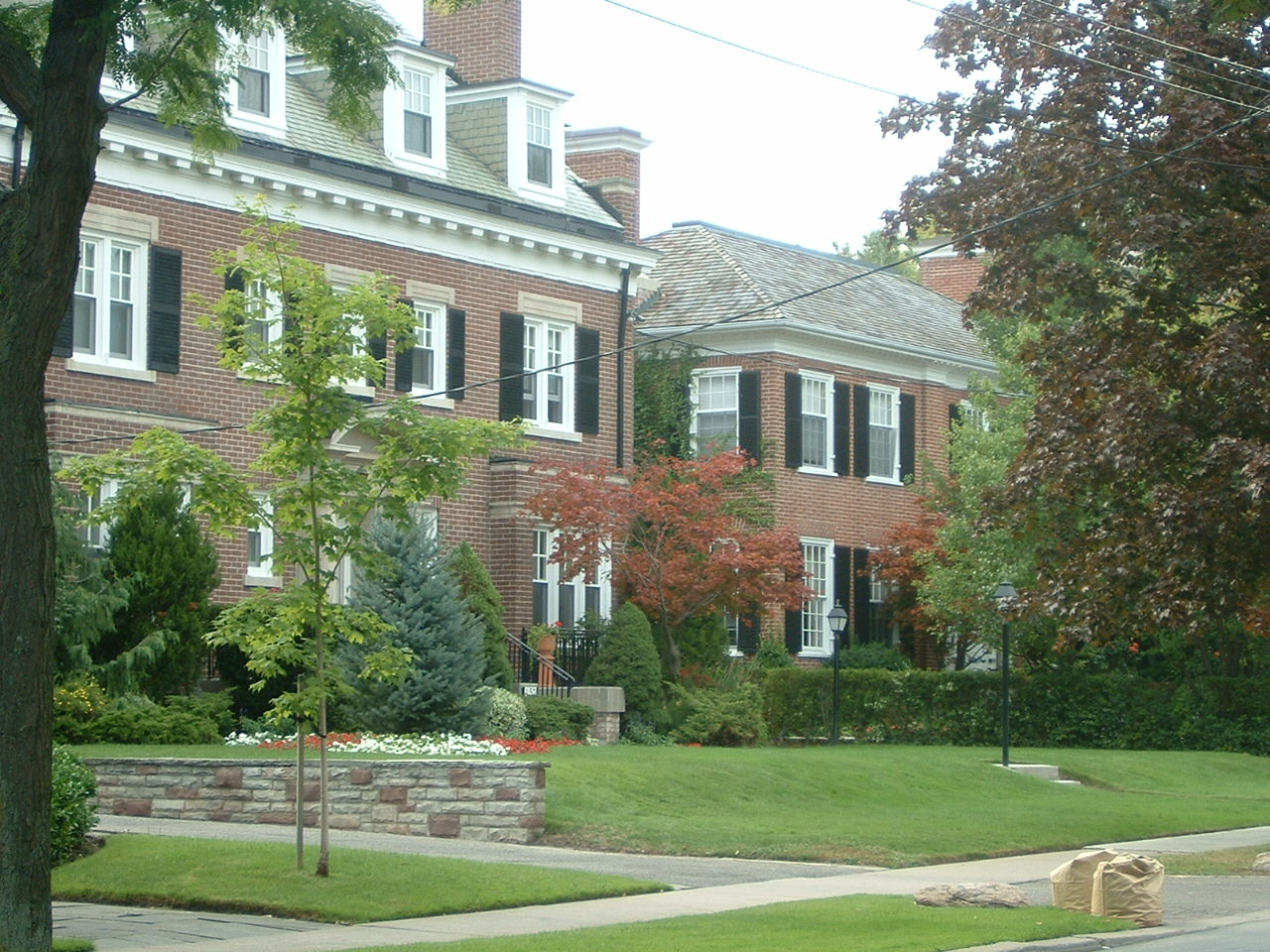
Streetscape of Warren Road in Forest Hill South

In 2007, the average sale price for a Forest Hill South home was $4,320,000, although renting a place in the neighbourhood was still relatively affordable as of 2011. Like much of Toronto today, that is no longer the case.

=== Streetscape ===
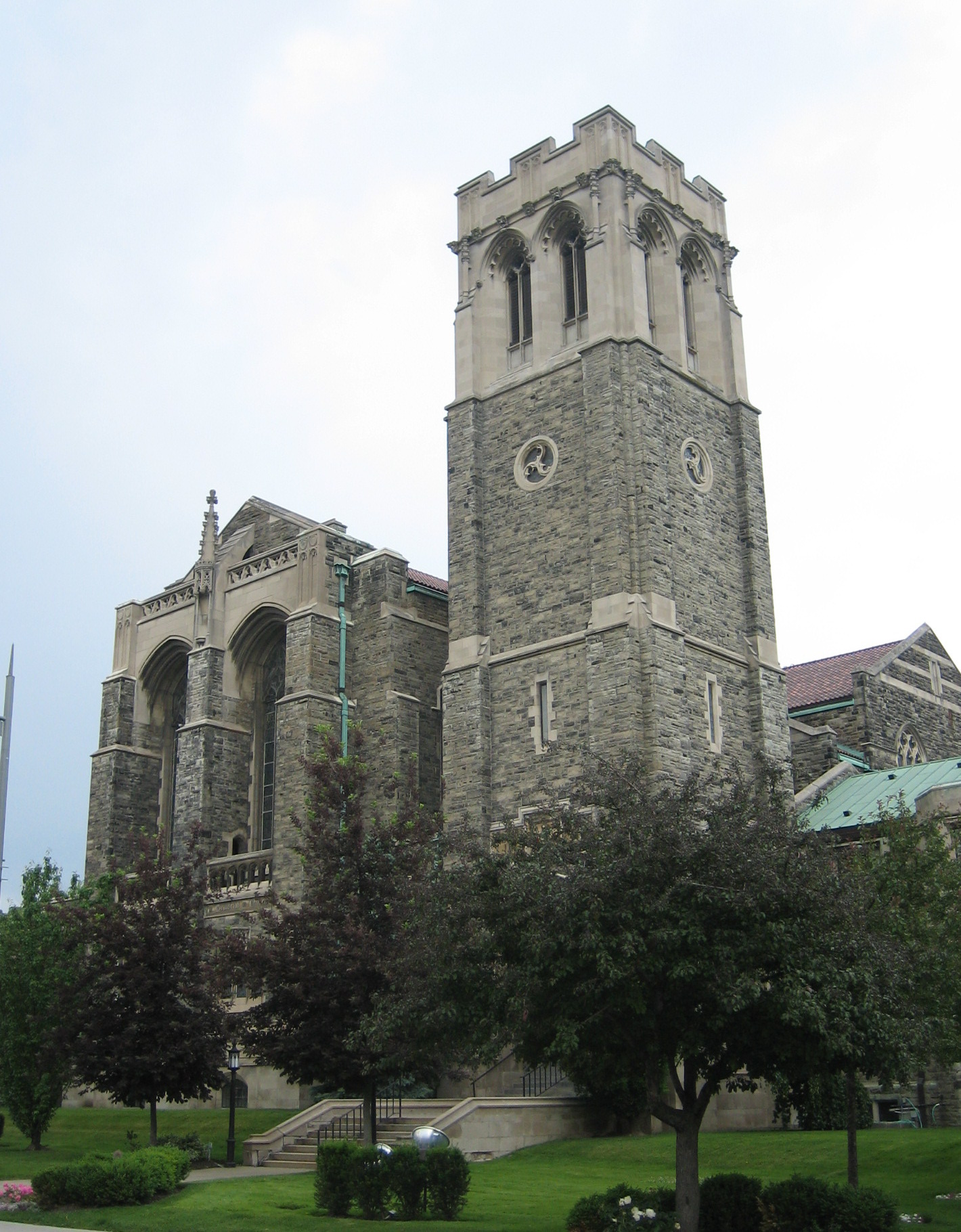
Timothy Eaton Memorial Church is a notable landmark in Forest Hill South

Several elements that contribute to the unique character of the area are its sidewalks and local roads, as well as landscaping and natural environment. Most of the area does not have sidewalks. Streets are often wide within the residential interior and many of the intersections have stop signs.

Spadina Road is the only surface transit route running through the neighbourhood, while St. Clair Avenue has a streetcar line connecting to Line 1 Yonge-University. Eglinton Avenue West has Line 5 Eglinton, connecting at Cedarvale station. Notable landmarks and structures in Forest Hill include Eglinton Theatre, Grace Church on-the-Hill, and Timothy Eaton Memorial Church.

== Demographics ==
=== Ethnicity ===
==== 2011 census ====
Forest Hill North top 5 ethnic and cultural groups (by ancestry) in 2011:

- 25% - Jewish
- 15% - Russian
- 13% - Polish
- 12% - Canadian
- 9% - Filipino
- 1% - Chinese

Forest Hill South top 5 ethnic and cultural groups (by ancestry) in 2011:

- 30% - Jewish
- 16% - Polish
- 16% - English
- 14% - Canadian
- 13% - Irish

The numbers add up to more than 100% due to people of mixed ancestry.

==== 2021 census ====
Forest Hill North top 10 ethnic and cultural groups (by ancestry) in 2021:

- 21.1% - Jewish
- 11.4% - Filipino
- 10.5% - Polish
- 9.6% - Russian
- 6.6% - Canadian
- 5.4% - English
- 4.9% - Irish
- 4.8% - Scottish
- 3.7% - German
- 3.6% - Italian

Forest Hill South top 10 ethnic and cultural groups (by ancestry) in 2021:

- 23.3% - Jewish
- 12.0% - Polish
- 10.3% - English
- 9.4% - Irish
- 9.3% - Russian
- 8.1% - Canadian
- 8.0% - Scottish
- 6.0% - German
- 5.2% - Chinese
- 5.2% - Italian

=== Family profile ===
==== 2006 census ====
Couple Family Structure Forest Hill North 2006

- 89.9% - Married
- 29.8% - Without children at home
- 60.0% - With children at home
- 21.8% - 1 child
- 26.4% - 2 children
- 11.4% - 3 or more children
- 10.1% - Common-law couples
- 8.0% - Without children at home
- 2.1% - With children at home
- 0.6% - 1 child
- 1.1% - 2 children
- 0.0% - 3 or more children

Couple Family Structure Forest Hill South 2006

- 88.2% - Married
- 37.6% - Without children at home
- 50.4% - With children at home
- 13.7% - 1 child
- 26.4% - 2 children
- 11.4% - 3 or more children
- 15.4% - Common-law couples
- 11.8% - Without children at home
- 10.3% - With children at home
- 1.1% - 1 child
- 1.1% - 2 children
- 0.0% - 3 or more children

==== 2021 census ====
Family structure, Forest Hill North:

- Total couple families in private households: 2,710 (100%)
- Married couples: 2,390 (88.2%)
- Married couples with children: 1,470 (54.2%)
- Common-law couples: 315 (11.6%)
- Common-law couples with children: 95 (3.5%)
- Children in a two-parent family: 2,950
- Children in a one-parent family: 765
- Average number of children in census families with children: 1.8

Family structure, Forest Hill South:

- Total couple families in private households: 2,540 (100%)
- Married couples: 2,155 (84.8%)
- Married couples with children: 1,100 (43.3%)
- Common-law couples: 380 (15.0%)
- Common-law couples with children: 80 (3.1%)
- Children in a two-parent family: 2,305
- Children in a one-parent family: 510
- Average number of children in census families with children: 1.9

=== Jewish community ===
Wealthy Jews began moving into the village in the 1930s. Holy Blossom Temple relocated to 1950 Bathurst Street in 1938, just outside the boundaries of Forest Hill, as a majority of its "uptown" membership had moved north of St. Clair Avenue. By 1941, Forest Hill village had 1,295 Jewish residents (11% of the population). With the mass suburbanization of the Toronto Jewish community after 1945, the Jewish population of Forest Hill grew to 11,000 by 1961. Forest Hill has a number of businesses catering to the Jewish community along Eglinton Avenue West. The 2021 census figures show 8,925 people who gave their religion as Jewish, 38.5% of the total; in answer to the census question about cultural or ethnic origin, 5,125 said Jewish, which is 22.1% of the total (these figures are for Forest Hill North and Forest Hill South combined, as compiled and published by the City of Toronto).

== Politics ==
=== Reeves of the Village of Forest Hill ===
- 1924–28 Lawrence H. Baldwin
- 1929–30 A.H. Keith Russell
- 1931–32 Andrew Hazlett
- 1933–35 Dr. Hugh M. Cook
- 1936–37 Arthur S. Leitch
- 1938–49 Frederick Goldwin Gardiner - became the first Metropolitan Toronto Chairman (1953-1962)
- 1950–51 Bruce Pettit Davis - lawyer
- 1952 Stewart Robertson - investment broker
- 1953-55 Charles O. Bick - resigned to become the first chairman of the Metropolitan Toronto Board of Police Commissioners (1955-1977)
- 1956–62 Laurie T. Simonsky - a merchant, and past president of Holy Blossom Temple
- 1963–67 Edwin J. Pivnick - a professional engineer and a lawyer

=== Federally and Provincially ===
Electorally, most of Forest Hill lies in the north-centre of Toronto—St. Paul's. This area is typically where the Conservatives are strongest in the riding.

Forest Hill tends to support the Conservative Party of Canada federally and the Progressive Conservative Party of Ontario provincially. A Conservative Party candidate interviewed in 2024 attributed the Conservatives' success to the Conservatives' putative support of Israel in the war in Gaza during the 2024 Toronto—St. Paul's byelection, a riding which much of Forest Hill lies in.

== Education ==
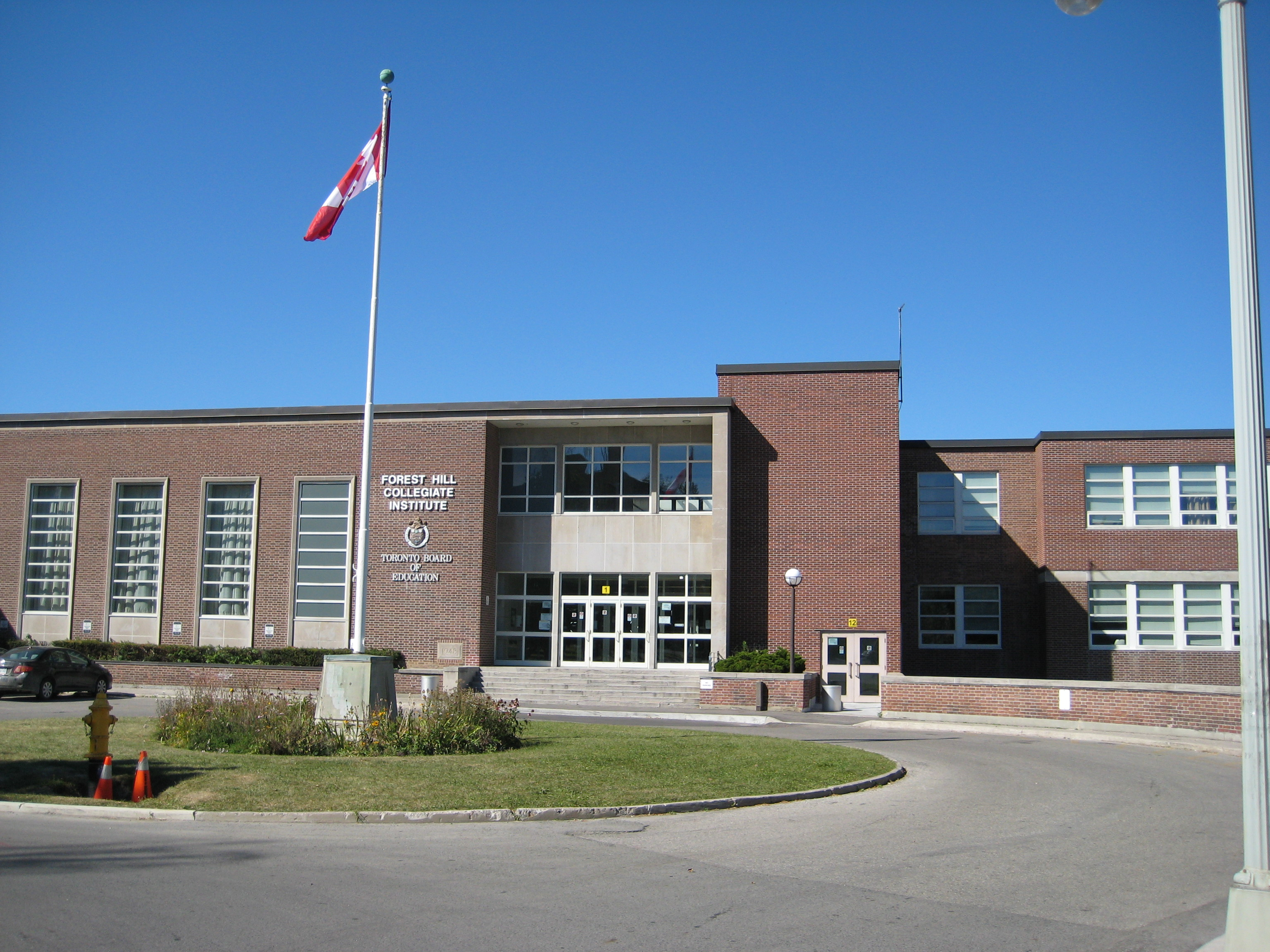
Forest Hill Collegiate Institute is a public secondary school operated by the Toronto District School Board.

Secular English-oriented public schools in Forest Hill are operated by the Toronto District School Board. In addition to the Toronto District School Board, three other publicly funded school boards operate in Toronto. The publicly funded English-oriented separate schools in Toronto are operated by the Toronto Catholic District School Board. Secular French-oriented public schools are provided by Conseil scolaire Viamonde, whereas French-oriented public separate school are provided by Conseil scolaire catholique MonAvenir. However, the latter three school boards do not operate a school in Forest Hill. Public schools in the area include:

- Forest Hill Collegiate Institute
- Forest Hill Junior and Senior Public School (Formerly South Preparatory Public School and Forest Hill Senior Public School)
- West Preparatory Public School
- North Preparatory Public School

In addition to publicly funded institutions, Forest Hill is home to three private school which provide primary and secondary levels of education. They include:

- Bishop Strachan School
- St. Michael's College School
- Upper Canada College

== Notable people ==
Comment: citation needed marked bios in this section do not establish a connection to the neighbourhood.

- John Bitove, businessman and owner/creator of Sirius XM Canada, The Toronto Raptors, Mobilicity, KEYreit
- Kurt Browning, figure skater
- George Cohon, founder of McDonald's in Moscow, owner of McDonald's Restaurants of Canada
- Drake, musician
- Bob Ezrin, Canadian Music Hall of Fame, music producer
- Sharon Fichman (born 1990), Canadian/Israeli tennis player
- Nelly Furtado, singer-songwriter
- Doug Gilmour, NHL player, winner of the Stanley Cup with the Calgary Flames
- Shenae Grimes, actress
- Zach Hyman, NHL ice hockey player
- Dan Kanter, Musical Director and Former Lead Guitarist for Justin Bieber
- Michael Landsberg, Media Personality, TSN Off The Record
- Stephen Lewis, politician and diplomat
- Lorne Michaels, CM, Executive Producer and creator of Saturday Night Live
- David Mirvish, theatre producer and developer, as well as his late parents, retailer Ed Mirvish and sculptor Anne Mirvish
- Peter Munk, founder of Barrick Gold Corporation
- Andy Pringle, Chairman of RP Investment Advisors, former chair of the Toronto Police Services Board
- Valerie Pringle, television host
- Colby Rasmus, Former Toronto Blue Jays outfielder
- Edward Rogers III, Deputy Chairman of Rogers Communications
- Suzanne A. Rogers, philanthropist
- Ted Rogers, Former President of Rogers Communications
- Perry Rosemond, CM, Director and Producer
- Joseph Rotman, businessman and philanthropist
- Isadore Sharp, OC, founder of the Four Seasons Hotels and Resorts
- Barry Sherman, billionaire businessman and Chairman and CEO of Apotex Inc.
- Frank Shuster, comedian, partner to Johnny Wayne
- Rosie Shuster, comedian, daughter of Frank Shuster
- Mats Sundin, NHL player, former captain of the Toronto Maple Leafs
- Larry Tanenbaum, Chairman of Maple Leaf Sports & Entertainment
- Nelson Thall, Owner of the Toronto Star, Board Member of Stan Lee Media Inc.
- Johnny Wayne, comedian
- Galen Weston, businessman and philanthropist, Loblaws, Holt Renfrew and Host for the Royal Family

== See also ==
- List of people from Toronto
- List of University of Toronto people
- List of neighbourhoods in Toronto
- List of people from Ontario
- Forest Hill (electoral district)
