= List of reeves and mayors of the former municipalities in Toronto =

A number of municipalities were amalgamated into the City of Toronto and the boroughs of Metropolitan Toronto in 1967. A second round of amalgamation merged additional municipalities into the City of Toronto in 1998. Lists of the former chief elected officials of these former municipalities, whether titled as reeves or mayors, are provided below.

== Municipalities absorbed in 1967 ==
The following municipalities were amalgamated into the existing townships of Etobicoke, Scarborough, North York, East York, York, (henceforth boroughs) or the old City of Toronto, effective January 1, 1967 as part of a reorganization of Metropolitan Toronto.

=== Forest Hill ===
Reeves of the Village of Forest Hill:

- 1924–28 Lawrence H. Baldwin
- 1929–30 A.H. Keith Russell
- 1931–32 Andrew Hazlett
- 1933–35 Dr. Hugh M. Cook
- 1936–37 Arthur S. Leitch
- 1938–49 Frederick Goldwin Gardiner - became the first Metropolitan Toronto Chairman (1953-1962)
- 1950–51 Bruce Pettit Davis - lawyer
- 1952 Stewart Robertson - investment broker
- 1953-55 Charles O. Bick - resigned to become the first chairman of the Metropolitan Toronto Board of Police Commissioners (1955-1977)
- 1956–62 Laurie T. Simonsky - a merchant, and past president of Holy Blossom Temple
- 1963–67 Edwin J. Pivnick - a professional engineer and a lawyer, was a physics lecturer at University of Toronto before attending law school. Was first elected to council in 1959. As reeve and a Metro Toronto Councillor, served on Metro's executive committee in 1964 and 1965. Considered running for Mayor of Toronto in 1969 as an official Liberal Party candidate but withdrew his name from consideration at the nominating convention.

=== Leaside ===
Mayors of Leaside from the town's incorporation until its merger into East York.

- 1913-1914 Randolph McRae - former official in the Canadian Northern Railway's Land Department
- 1915-1923 Robert Phipps Ormsby - secretary of the Canadian National Railway
- 1924-1930 Herbert Horsfall - president of Canada Wire and Cable Company, co-founder of the Leaside Munitions Company, and president of the Leaside Housing Company.
- 1931-1935 George H. Wilkinson - station agent for the Canadian Pacific Railway in Parkdale
- 1936-1937 John Scott
- 1938-1947 Henry Howard Talbot - a carpenter by trade, he started a construction business and in the 1920s, bought land in Leaside and became a land developer, building homes and a low-rise apartment building
- 1948-1950 G. Trace Manes - one of the founders of the Leaside Baseball Association, Manes worked for Massey-Harris for 38 years. After serving as mayor he was a member of the Metro Planning Board
- 1951-1955 Howard T. Burrell - a chartered accountant by profession
- 1956-1961 Charles Henry Hiscott - resigned as mayor to become the town's treasurer. Subsequently, worked as a bylaw enforcement officer and standards tribunal officer for East York.
- 1962 Lloyd M. Dickinson - an entrepreneur, Dickinson variously owned a plastics products firm, a real estate holding company, and in the 1970s built the first industrial condominiums in Canada.
- 1963-1966 Beth Nealson - a former reporter and columnist for a local newspaper, she first ran for school trustee at the urging of her colleagues in the Imperial Order Daughters of the Empire in 1952. Went on to be elected to Leaside council in 1959 and ran for mayor against Dickinson in the next election, defeating him by 5 votes after a recount. She became known as "Mrs. Leaside". When East York and Leaside were amalgamated she ran against East York reeve True Davidson to be mayor of the new borough in what was billed by the media as the "Battle of the Belles".

=== Long Branch ===
Reeves of the Village of Long Branch:

- 1931–1932, 1934-1936 John Shannon
- 1933 Robert A. Westbrook
- 1937 Joseph C. Deyman
- 1938–1941, 1944 Samuel Thomas Wright, previously Conservative MPP for Dovercourt (1926-1934)
- 1942-1943 John Ord (Jack) Elton - general manager for a supermarket chain
- 1945–1947, 1951-1953 Thomas F. Carter - In 1954, ran for the federal Progressive Conservative nomination for York West but was defeated by John Borden Hamilton who went on to win the by-election
- 1948-1950 Lawrence Iles - owned a butcher shop
- 1954-1962 Marie Curtis - only woman to become reeve of Long Branch. She and Dorothy Hague were the first women reeves or mayors in the Toronto area.
- 1963-1964 Leonard E. Ford - advocated the merger of Long Branch with Mimico and New Toronto rather than amalgamation of Metro Toronto.
- 1965-1966 Thomas Berry - grew up in a London orphanage as his merchant seaman father was unable to care for him. Berry, himself, joined the British Merchant Navy when he was 15 and was torpedoed three times during World War II. After the war he trained as a steamfitter and then moved to Canada with his wife and child, settling in Long Branch in 1947 where he lived on the same street for the next 50 years. He was active with the Plumbers and Steamfitters Union becoming business agent of his union local as well as its chief negotiator, and a member of the New Democratic Party. He was elected reeve in 1964 and fought a losing battle against Long Branch's amalgamation into Etobicoke. He also crusaded to save a local school from demolition, it reopened in 1970 as the Thomas Berry Daycare Centre. On Metro Toronto Council, he successfully fought against plans to tear down Toronto's Old City Hall.

=== Mimico ===
Mayors of the Town of Mimico:

- 1911-1914 Robert Skelton (Reeve)
- 1915 Caesar Coxhead (Reeve)
- 1914, 1916-1918 John Harrison (Mayor from 1917)
- 1919-1920 Louis West
- 1921-1925 John Doughty
- 1926 William Savage
- 1927-1929, 1955-1960 Gus Edwards - A railway engineer, Edwards was nicknamed "Metropolitan Gus" for his long-time advocacy for uniting the city of Toronto with its suburbs in a federation. Edwards first advocated a metropolitan form of government in 1926 and continued his campaign while on York County council in the 1930s. He opposed the construction of the Bloor-Danforth subway line and the Toronto Transit Commission's system of fare zones which charged suburban riders double fares.
- 1930–1932 Robert Waites - a builder, he was the uncle of later mayor Amos Waites Waites often quarreled with other town officials, including the reeve and town clerk. In one instance Waites ordered the town's chief constable to remove the reeve and deputy reeve from a council meeting, and in another incident his rival, Archibald Norris, accusing Waites of acting like a "little local Mussolini". Waites was ruled to be in contravention of the Municipal Act for his company accepting payment from the town's sewage commission for construction and maintenance work, but was not removed from office.
- 1933–1935, 1941–1942, 1946, 1949–1954 Archibald Norris - Elected or acclaimed to 12 terms, Norris was Mimico's longest serving mayor. He immigrated to Canada from Deal, England in 1912. Operated a grocery store for 12 years before entering the insurance business. First elected to town council in 1916.
- 1936–1940, 1943–1945, 1947–1948 Amos Waites - He was the nephew of former mayor Robert Waites. During the Great Depression when relief was only paid to men who agreed to labour on public works projects, Waites announced "No work, no relief!" and cut pay to strikers. His house was picketed by protesters bearing signs that said "We can't live on five cents a meal. Waites grew up on a market garden and got his first job at the age of 11 as the caretaker of a one-room schoolhouse for $2 a month. He served on town council for 30 years. Waites's council passed a by-law in 1947 asking the Ontario Municipal Board to create Metropolitan Toronto, consolidating municipal services in the area.
- 1961–1966 Hugh McGregor Griggs - reporter for the Toronto Telegram and one time editor of its educational magazine. Served on Mimico township council for 20 years. Served as a school trustee on the Etobicoke Board of Education following amalgamation. Unsuccessful candidate for the Etobicoke Board of Control in 1972.

=== New Toronto ===
Mayors of the Town of New Toronto:

- 1913–1917 George Ironside (Reeve)
- 1917–1922 Charles Lovejoy - Mayor from 1920
- 1922 S. Tucker
- 1923–1926 George Janes
- 1926–1929 George Warner
- 1929–1937, 1938–1952 William G.W. Jackson - Farmer and land speculator, previously Reeve of Etobicoke (1919-1920), died in office
- 1937 S.B. Douglas
- 1952–1954 E.W. Grant - lawyer by profession
- 1954 John L. (Jack) Strath - retired locomotive engineer with the Canadian National Railway and was active with the Brotherhood of Locomotive Engineers. First elected to town council in 1937; was Warden of York County in 1952.
- 1955–1967 Donald R. Russell - pharmacist who had run a drug store in New Toronto since 1933. Served as first chairman of the Lakeshore Board of Education before being elected to town council in 1954. After amalgamation, he was elected to the Etobicoke Board of Control for two terms.

=== Swansea ===
Reeves of the Village of Swansea:

Reeves of the Village of Swansea
No.	Reeve	Term in office	Other offices	Biography
1	James Arthur Harvey	1926-1927		Leading local architect. Among the first in Toronto develop the two and three storey walk-up apartment block. Created 'Harcroft', adjacent to High Park, which was one of the first bird and wild flower sanctuaries in Canada.
2	Robert John Wallace	1928-1937	Previously Mayor of Alliston, Ontario; Manager of Swansea Hydro	Immigrated from Ireland at the age of 2, Wallace moved to Toronto in 1912 after having lived in Alliston, Ontario. He was active in the Conservative party. Died in 1964 at the age of 93.
3	Clarence C. Downey	1938-1945	Chairman of Toronto Transit Commission (1960-1963); Toronto Transit Commission commissioner (1960-1968)	Lawyer with a practice in west Toronto
4	Elmer Brandon	1946-1951	Warden of York County; Progressive Conservative MPP for York West (1951-1956)	Lawyer by profession
5	C. Douglas Cameron	1952	Councillor (1945-1949); Deputy Reeve (1946-1949)	Cameron was an accountant with the Dominion Income Tax Bureau
6	Dorothy Hague	1953-1962	School trustee (1933-1949); Chairman of Swansea Board of Education for 7 years First elected Swansea Councillor in 1949; Deputy Reeve (1951-1952); Also served on Metro Toronto Executive; Chair of Metro Parks and Planning Committees	Taught Latin at Mimico High School from 1922 to 1924. Hague was the descendant of pioneers and is credited, as chair of the Metro Conservation Authority's historic sites advisory board, with winning Metro and the province's support for the creation of Black Creek Pioneer Village. First woman reeve of Swansea and, with Marie Curtis, first woman reeve or mayor in York County. On Metro Council, she fought against amalgamation of Swansea into Toronto and in favour of spending for public transit over expressways.
7	Lucien C. Kurata	1963- April 30, 1966	Provincial court judge (1966–69)	First Japanese-Canadian to be called to the bar in Ontario, in 1948. He was the first Japanese-Canadian called to the bench when he was appointed as a provincial court magistrate in 1966. He was removed in 1969 after a public inquiry determined he was unfit, leading the provincial cabinet to remove him from the bench. He was the first judge to be removed from the bench under the Provincial Courts Act. In 1969, Justice Donald Keith of the Ontario Supreme Court ruled in a 221-page report that Kurata was "unfit by reason of misbehavior" and that in a 76-day period in 1968, Kurata had attempted suicide, offered to use his influence to reduce charges against a prostitute in exchange for sexual favours, and made the same offer to an undercover female police officer posing as a prostitute, whom he had indecently assaulted. After being removed from the bench, he moved to Shelburne, Ontario in 1969, where he restarted his legal practice. He died two years later, aged 48.
8	James T. Bonham	May 2 - December 31, 1966	School trustee on Swansea Board of Education (1945-1962); Swansea councillor (1963-1966); Chairman of the Toronto Board of Education (1971); Toronto school trustee (1970-1972)	Worked for Goodyear Tire and Rubber Co. as a cost accountant for 43 years. As a village school trustee led the campaign for an indoor ice rink and helped establish a music program and a remedial reading program at Swansea's only elementary school. Initiated eye and dental exams for all children attending the school.

=== Weston ===
Mayors of the Town of Weston:

- 1914-1918 Dr. W. J. Charlton
- 1919-1920 John Gardhouse - prominent cattle breeder who was inducted into the Canadian Agricultural Hall of Fame, and co-founder of the Royal Agricultural Winter Fair. Served on Etobicoke's town council, including three terms as reeve, prior to moving to Weston, and as Warden of York County. Later served as chair of the Toronto Board of Education in 1917. In 2003, his neighbourhood organized to have his home and stable designated a heritage site and save it from demolition.
- 1921-1925 Robert John Flynn
- 1926-1928 George Sainsbury
- 1929-1930 A. Lorne Coulter
- 1931 W. J. Pollett
- 1932-1934 Sam J. Totten
- 1935-1936 Frank Walton Mertens
- 1937-1939 George Benjamin Evans
- 1940-1942 Gordon S. Harris
- 1942-1945 John P. Allan
- 1946-1948 Thomas Dougherty
- 1949 Kenneth L. Thompson - first elected to Weston council in 1939. Served a term as Warden of York County in 1948. Ran unsuccessfully as a Liberal candidate in the 1949, 1953, and 1957 federal elections. Thompson owned his own insurance company and was an underwriter for Canada Life. While warden, he was instrumental in introducing trolley buses into Toronto's transit system. He served as chairman of the York Planning Board in the 1960s.
- 1950-1954 Richard C. Seagrave - born in London, England, Seagrave came to Canada at the age of 2. At 15, he started working for the Great North-Western Telegraph Company (later CN Telegraph) rising from office boy to administrative assistant to the general manager. He was also on the board of the Canadian National Exhibition.
- 1955-1958 Harry Clark - Clark suggested renaming the Lakeshore Expressway after Metro Chairman Fred Gardiner
- 1959-1960 Jack L. Holley - a pilot with Trans-Canada Airlines, Holley retired from office as his job did provide him enough time to spend on his mayoralty duties.
- 1961-1964 George W. Bull - a local lawyer, Bull was a member of one of Weston's founding families
- 1965-1966 Charles Wesley Boddington - after amalgamation, he served on York's Board of Control for a term. Boddington lost an arm and a leg during World War II after the bomber he was flying exploded over Düsseldorf, and spent the rest of the war in a POW camp. He set up a motor vehicle licensing bureau in Weston in 1947 which he ran until his death in 1984. He ran as a Progressive Conservative candidate in York West in the 1968 Canadian federal election, placing third. In 1969, he ran for mayor of York, but lost to Phil White. He was named to the Order of Canada in 1977.

== Municipalities amalgamated in 1998 ==
The following municipalities of Metropolitan Toronto were amalgamated into the new municipal government of Toronto, effective January 1, 1998.

=== East York ===
Reeves of the Township of East York (pre-1967) and mayors of the Borough of East York (after 1967)

=== Etobicoke ===
Reeves of the Township of Etobicoke (pre-1967) and Mayors of the Borough and City of Etobicoke (after 1967)

=== North York ===
Reeves of the Township of North York (pre-1967) and Mayors of the Borough and City of North York (after 1967)

=== Scarborough ===
Reeves of the Township of Scarborough and mayors of Borough and City of Scarborough (after 1967)

=== York ===
Reeves of the Township of York (pre-1967) and mayors of the Borough and City of York (after 1967)

=== Toronto (pre-1998) ===
Mayors of the former City of Toronto (1834–1998) prior to its amalgamation with East York, Etobicoke, North York, Scarborough, and York
