= Jack Mould =

Canadian politician (1921–1990)

1st Mayor of York
- In office 1966–1969
- Preceded by: himself (as reeve)
- Succeeded by: Philip White

Reeve of York
- In office 1963–1966
- Preceded by: Walter Saunders
- Succeeded by: himself (as mayor)

Personal details
- Born: 1921
- Died: 1990; Toronto, Ontario

Jack Mould (1921-1990) was the last Reeve of York Township and the first mayor of the borough of York, one of six municipalities that made up Metropolitan Toronto.

== Military service and early career ==
During World War II, Mould served in the Royal Canadian Air Force and was awarded the Distinguished Flying Cross.

Mould formed and became president of a ratepayers' association. Until 1959, he was in business with his father as a general contractor building industrial plants and houses.

== Political career ==
In 1952, he was elected a school trustee on the York Board of Education. He was elected a York Township Councillor in 1957.

Mould was elected reeve in the 1962 election, narrowly defeating former reeve Chris Tonks by 44 votes, after a recount.

After York Township was merged with the neighbouring town of Weston, he was elected the first mayor of the Borough of York in the 1966 municipal election on December 6, 1966; his term began January 1, 1967.

As reeve and then mayor of York, Mould sat on Metropolitan Toronto Council, and was an appointee on the Metro Toronto Police Commission.

=== Campaign for Metro Chairman ===
Mould launched a campaign for Chairman of the Municipality of Metropolitan Toronto to succeed William R. Allen, who was retiring. He was a leading candidate until days before the election Ralph Cowan, the former Liberal Member of Parliament for York—Humber, gave a speech accusing Mould of being in a conflict of interest over a by-law York Council had passed, and that Mould had supported, writing off taxes owed by Robina General Contracting Firm which, it was alleged, Mould had a financial interest in. Mould sued Cowan for libel, and while denying any financial stake in Robina, admitted that a company he owned, owed $800 in unpaid taxes to York, a fact that would have disqualified him from running in the 1966 municipal election, had it been known at the time. Mould was still prepared to run for Metro Chairman, a position elected by the members of Metropolitan Toronto Council, however, when council met the two councillors who had previously agreed to nominate Mould rose and nominated former North York reeve Norman Goodhead instead as they decided not to nominate Mould "in view of developments in York".

=== Aftermath ===
The scandal did not abate, with ratepayers associations and members of York Council demanding Mould's resignation as mayor. After growing pressure, calls on the province to remove him from office, and the announcement by Controller Philip White that he would be running for mayor against Mould in the upcoming election, Mould announced on October 21, 1969, that he would not be standing for re-election in the municipal election in December.

In 1969, Mould sued Ralph Cowan, the former Liberal Member of Parliament for York—Humber, for libel over a speech he had made in which he accused Mould of being in a conflict of interest over the tax write off by-law; a speech which first brought the allegations against Mould into the public realm.

Three years after Mould filed his libel suit against Cowan, he still had not taken any steps to bring the matter to trial, leading Cowan to accuse him of having brought the suit in an attempt to quash discussion of the allegations.

Mould was active in the Progressive Conservative Party of Ontario and was a delegate at the 1971 Progressive Conservative Party of Ontario leadership election.
