= Chris Tonks =

Canadian politician (1917–2006)

Reeve of York
- In office January 1, 1957 – December 31, 1960
- Preceded by: F.W. Hall
- Succeeded by: Frederick Charles Taylor

Personal details
- Born: Christopher Alexander Tonks; March 23, 1917 York County, Ontario
- Died: February 6, 2006 (aged 88)
- Occupation: storekeeper, postmaster

Christopher Alexander Tonks (March 23, 1917 – February 6, 2006) was a long-time politician in the Toronto municipality of York, Ontario from 1949 to 1988. He served as reeve of the then-Township of York from 1957 to 1960. He was unseated in 1960 by a court order due to a conflict of interest scandal involving his house which was built on land purchased from the township, but then reinstated only to be defeated in that year's municipal election. He attempted to regain the reeveship several times in subsequent municipal elections but was unsuccessful.

He returned to council as a borough alderman in 1967, was defeated in 1969, and then returned to council again as an alderman for Ward 5 in 1972, where he remained until his retirement in 1988.

He is the father of Alan Tonks, who served as mayor of York during the elder Tonks's final years as an alderman, and went on to be Metropolitan Toronto Chairman, and then Member of Parliament for York South.

== Life ==
His parents immigrated from England around the turn of the twentieth century and settled in Scarborough, Ontario. His father was a bricklayer and his mother ran one of Toronto's first United Cigar Stores outlets, on Kingston Road. The couple and their five children lost their properties during the Great Depression and moved to York, Ontario where they opened a new United Cigar Stores outlet and hardware store. Christopher Tonks became the store's postmaster, a position he'd maintain for much of his political career. He would dispense advice to his customers and his store became a meeting place for debate in his neighbourhood, prompting his entry into politics.

In 1949, he was elected to the township council for York's ward 2, later becoming deputy reeve. He became acting reeve on September 4, 1956, after Reeve F.W. Hall resigned to become chairman of the Metropolitan Toronto licensing commission and was elected reeve in his own right in the December 1956 municipal election, taking office on January 1, 1957. The Chris Tonks Arena was named in his honour.

Tonks was accused of having, while serving as reeve, to have rigged the sale of a tract of municipal land to himself in 1957, at a favourable price, on which he built his family's home. The transaction was revealed in 1959 during a royal commission into allegations of corrupt land deals in York Township. Tonks had bought the land from the township, through a third party, for $6,600 – a sale that was approved by the township council. Tonks claimed at the royal commission inquiry that he disclosed his interest in the property and refrained from voting but neither of those claims were reflected in the meeting minutes. Royal Commissioner Judge Joseph Sweet wrote in his report that the Tonks transaction was "symptomatic of an unhealthy attitude toward law, an attitude which if persisted in, might seriously adversely affect the financial affairs of the township.

A neighbour complained that under the Ontario Municipal Act, they should have been offered the property first and sued Tonks. The case was dismissed in a lower court, but in 1965, the Court of Appeal overturned the decision and nullified the sale of the property to Tonks, and he was forced to relinquish the property to the township. Revelations made during the royal commission inquiry led a group of ratepayers to seek a court order unseating Tonks as reeve in 1960. They succeeded, but the order was overturned by the court of appeal and Tonks was reinstated as reeve, only to be defeated when he ran for re-election in the December 1960 municipal election by reformer Frederick Charles Taylor by an almost 3 to 1 margin. Tonks made two further attempts to be elected reeve but was defeated both times by Jack Mould. The Supreme Court upheld the court of appeal ruling nullifying Tonks's purchase of the property. Despite the Supreme Court ruling, Tonks won a seat on council as an alderman in an election held days later. He lost an attempt to be elected to York's Board of Control in 1969, and then returned to council again as an alderman for Ward 5 in 1972, where he remained until his retirement in 1988. He is the father of Alan Tonks, who served as mayor of York during the elder Tonks's final years as an alderman, and subsequently as Metro Chairman, and then Member of Parliament for York South. His grandson is school trustee Chris Tonks.
