= Ralph Cowan (politician) =

Canadian politician

- Official 1966 portrait

Member of Parliament for York—Humber
- In office 1962–1968
- Preceded by: Margaret Aitken
- Succeeded by: riding dissolved

Personal details
- Born: May 6, 1902 Ottawa, Ontario
- Died: April 21, 1990 (aged 87)
- Party: Liberal

Ralph Bronson Cowan (May 6, 1902 – April 21, 1990) was a Canadian politician, who represented York—Humber in the House of Commons of Canada from 1962 to 1968.

== Federal political career ==
Born in Ottawa, Ontario, Ralph Cowan was first elected to the House of Commons of Canada in the 1962 election, defeating Margaret Aitken. A Liberal, he was re-elected in 1963 and 1965. In 1964, he filed a lawsuit against the Canadian Broadcasting Corporation after it converted its secondary Toronto station CJBC to an affiliate of the francophone Radio-Canada network, arguing that since the French language had no legal status outside of Quebec, the station's conversion to French was inappropriate and illegal; however, his case was dismissed by the Ontario Supreme Court in 1965 on the grounds that Cowan did not have legal standing and could not show material harm from the format change.

Although a Liberal, Cowan was considered a renegade and often voted against his own caucus; most notably, he filibustered both Lawrence Pennell's 1967 bill to abolish capital punishment in Canada and the 1968 Broadcasting Act, and opposed Justice Minister Pierre Trudeau's 1968 revisions to the Criminal Code, including the decriminalization of homosexuality and abortion. He was expelled from the Liberal Party caucus in March 1968 after voting against the government's tax bill, but fought to retain his rights as a voting party member at the 1968 Liberal Party of Canada leadership convention, and pledged that he would continue to support the government if it faced a motion of non-confidence.

He ran in the 1968 federal election as an Independent Liberal in High Park after being expelled from caucus, and distributed pamphlets published by far right activist Ron Gostick alleging that Trudeau was a communist sympathizer as part of his campaign, but was defeated by Liberal candidate Walter Deakon.

== Municipal politics ==
Following his federal defeat, Cowan attempted to intervene in the 1969 election for Metro Toronto Chairman, alleging in a speech made days before the election that the York mayor Jack Mould had a personal financial interest in a construction company whose tax arrears had been written off by York's municipal council. Mould was forced out of the contest when, at the last minute, two Metro Councillors who had agreed to nominate him decided to nominate another candidate instead as they decided not to nominate Mould "in view of developments in York". Mould filed a slander lawsuit against Cowan days after he made the allegation, but the suit never went to court and Cowan later claimed that it had been filed solely to silence him.

Following the death of York municipal councillor Robert Hewitt in 1971, Cowan applied for appointment to the seat; he was not appointed, with council instead selecting Robert Waclawski.

== Electoral record ==
1962 Canadian federal election
Party	Candidate	Votes	%	±%
Liberal	Ralph Cowan	15,526		
Progressive Conservative	Margaret Aitken	14,864		
New Democratic Party	Charles Millard	11,622		
Social Credit	Ronald G. Sibbald	564		

1963 Canadian federal election
Party	Candidate	Votes	%	±%
Liberal	Ralph Cowan	20,188		
Progressive Conservative	Douglas Morton	12,218		
New Democratic Party	Charles Millard	11,821		

1965 Canadian federal election
Party	Candidate	Votes	%	±%
Liberal	Ralph Cowan	17,172		
New Democratic Party	Don Stevenson	12,792		
Progressive Conservative	Victor Colebourn	11,325		
New Capitalist Party	D. C. Tilley	235		

1968 Canadian federal election
Party	Candidate	Votes
Liberal	Walter Deakon	16,260
Progressive Conservative	Win McKay	10,743
New Democratic	Don Stevenson	8,131
Independent Liberal	Ralph Cowan	2,895
Independent	Henry Formosa	215
