= York—Humber (federal electoral district) =

Former federal electoral district in Ontario, Canada

Ontario electoral district

Defunct federal electoral district
- Legislature: House of Commons
- District created: 1952
- District abolished: 1966
- First contested: 1953
- Last contested: 1965

York—Humber was a federal electoral district represented in the House of Commons of Canada from 1953 to 1968. It was located in the province of Ontario. This riding was created in 1952 from parts of York South riding.

York—Humber consisted of the towns of Mimico and Weston (excluding the Ellis Court Apartments), the village of Swansea, and parts of the townships of Etobicoke and York in what was later known as Metropolitan Toronto.

The electoral district was abolished in 1966 when it was re-distributed between Etobicoke, High Park, Lakeshore, York South and York West ridings.

== Members of Parliament ==
This riding elected the following members of the House of Commons of Canada:

Parliament	Years	Member	Party
Riding created from York South
22nd	1953–1957	Margaret Aitken	Progressive Conservative
23rd	1957–1958	Margaret Aitken	Progressive Conservative
24th	1958–1962	Margaret Aitken	Progressive Conservative
25th	1962–1963	Ralph Cowan	Liberal
26th	1963–1965	Ralph Cowan	Liberal
27th	1965–1968	Ralph Cowan	Liberal
Riding dissolved into York South, York West, Etobicoke, High Park and Lakeshore

== Election results ==
1953 Canadian federal election
Party	Candidate	Votes	%	±%
Progressive Conservative	Margaret Aitken	11,157		
Liberal	Kenneth L. Thompson	11,090		
Co-operative Commonwealth	Jennie B. Prosser	4,924		

1957 Canadian federal election
Party	Candidate	Votes	%	±%
Progressive Conservative	Margaret Aitken	18,449		
Liberal	Kenneth L. Thompson	10,851		
Co-operative Commonwealth	Margaret Thetford	4,872		
Social Credit	Charles R. Ellis	1,324		

1958 Canadian federal election
Party	Candidate	Votes	%	±%
Progressive Conservative	Margaret Aitken	23,723		
Liberal	Elena Murdock Dacosta	9,557		
Co-operative Commonwealth	Leonard Collins	6,257		

1962 Canadian federal election
Party	Candidate	Votes	%	±%
Liberal	Ralph Cowan	15,526		
Progressive Conservative	Margaret Aitken	14,864		
New Democratic	Charles Millard	11,622		
Social Credit	Ronald G. Sibbald	564		

1963 Canadian federal election
Party	Candidate	Votes	%	±%
Liberal	Ralph Cowan	20,188		
Progressive Conservative	M. Douglas Morton	12,218		
New Democratic	Charlie H. Millard	11,821		

1965 Canadian federal election
Party	Candidate	Votes	%	±%
Liberal	Ralph Cowan	17,172		
New Democratic	Don Stevenson	12,792		
Progressive Conservative	Victor Colebourn	11,325		
New Capitalist	D. C. Tilley	235		

== See also ==
- List of Canadian electoral districts
- Historical federal electoral districts of Canada
