= Margaret Aitken =

Canadian author, columnist, journalist, and politician

Member of Parliament for York—Humber
- In office 1953–1962
- Preceded by: new district
- Succeeded by: Ralph Cowan

Personal details
- Born: July 3, 1906 Newcastle, New Brunswick, Canada
- Died: November 19, 1980 (aged 74)
- Party: Progressive Conservative
- Occupation: Journalist

Margaret Aitken (July 3, 1906 – November 19, 1980) was a Canadian author, columnist, journalist, and politician.

== Background ==
Aitken was born in Newcastle, New Brunswick. She attended Branksome Hall in Toronto. She was the daughter of Joseph Magnus 'Mauns' Aitken and her uncle was Max Aitken, 1st Baron Beaverbrook. Her brother, William Aitken and his son Jonathan Aitken (her nephew) were members of the British House of Commons.

She started with the Toronto Telegram in 1938 and was a foreign correspondent. She was noted for covering the birth of Israel as a nation and she became a strong supporter of the Jewish state. In 1953, she wrote a book Hey Ma! I Did It (Toronto: Clarke, Irwin & Company) about her political campaign in the same year.

== Politics ==
In the 1953 federal election, she was elected to the House of Commons of Canada in the riding of York—Humber as the Progressive Conservative candidate, winning by 67 votes. Along with Sybil Bennett, Ellen Fairclough and Ann Shipley, she was one of four women elected to the House of Commons that year, only the second election in Canadian history in which more than one woman was elected to Parliament.

In 1957 she became the first woman to be appointed chair of a parliamentary committee, the Standing Committee on Standing Orders. The committee discusses rules of the House. She was re-elected in 1957 and 1958. She was defeated in 1962 by 662 votes.

== Later life ==
In 1962, Aitken was appointed as Canada's representative to the UN's Commission on Human Rights. She died at age 72 after a long illness.

== Electoral record ==
1953 Canadian federal election
Party	Candidate	Votes	%	±%
Progressive Conservative	Margaret Aitken	11,157		
Liberal	Kenneth L. Thompson	11,090		
Co-operative Commonwealth	Jennie B. Prosser	4,924		

1957 Canadian federal election
Party	Candidate	Votes	%	±%
Progressive Conservative	Margaret Aitken	18,449		
Liberal	Kenneth L. Thompson	10,851		
Co-operative Commonwealth	Margaret Thetford	4,872		
Social Credit	Charles R. Ellis	1,324		

1958 Canadian federal election
Party	Candidate	Votes	%	±%
Progressive Conservative	Margaret Aitken	23,723		
Liberal	Elena Murdock Dacosta	9,557		
Co-operative Commonwealth	Leonard Collins	6,257		

1962 Canadian federal election
Party	Candidate	Votes	%	±%
Liberal	Ralph Cowan	15,526		
Progressive Conservative	Margaret Aitken	14,864		
New Democratic Party	Charles Millard	11,622		
Social Credit	Ronald G. Sibbald	564		

== Publications ==
- Aitken, Margaret; Sanders, Byrne Hope (1953). Hey Ma! I did it. Clarke, Irwin & co. Ltd. pp. xiv, 213.
