= Runnymede Collegiate Institute =

Public secondary school in Toronto, Ontario, Canada

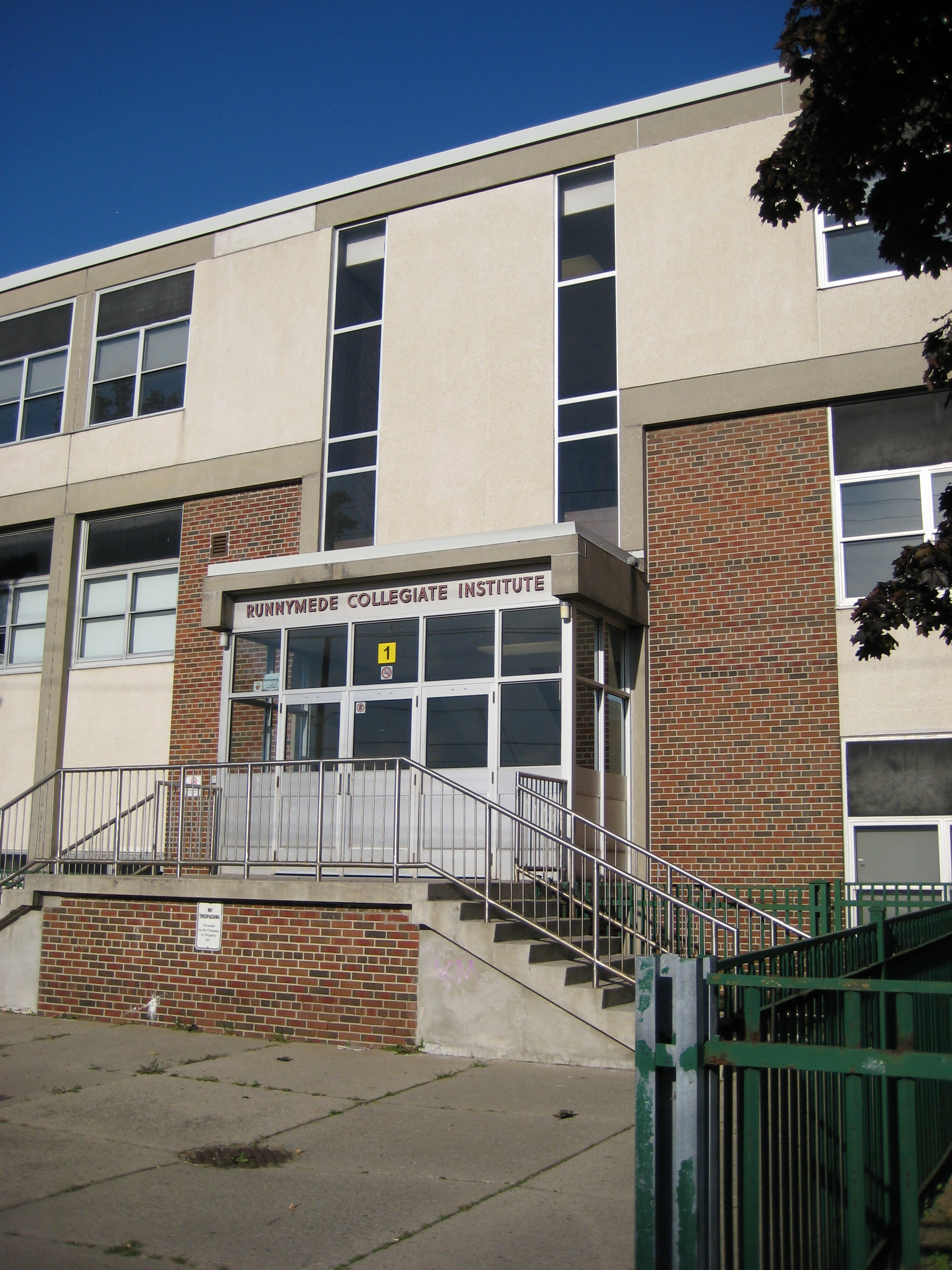

Location
- 569 Jane Street; Toronto, Ontario, M6S 4A3; Canada; 43.663387°N 79.489501°W

Information
- Former name: Runnymede High School (1927-1928)
- School type: Public Secondary School
- Motto: Vestigia Nulla Retrorsum (No Steps Backward)
- Founded: September 6, 1927; 99 years ago
- School board: Toronto District School Board (Board of Education for the City of York)
- Superintendent: Sandy Spyropoulos; LC4, Superintendent; Tracy Hayhurst; LN20
- Area trustee: Alexis Dawson; Ward 3
- School number: 6776 / 939609
- Principal: Albert Cho
- Grades: 9-12
- Enrollment: 474 (2020)
- Language: English
- Schedule type: Semestered
- Area: York
- Colours: Red, White
- Slogan: Worth Discovering
- Mascot: The Raven
- Team name: Runnymede Ravens; Runnymede Redmen (1927—1994)
- Website: schoolweb.tdsb.on.ca/runnymedeci/Home.aspx

Runnymede Collegiate Institute (colloquially known as Runnymede CI, RCI, or Runnymede) is a public high school in Toronto, Ontario, Canada managed and operated by the Toronto District School Board. The school first opened in 1927 as Runnymede High School by the York Township High School Board, which became the Board of Education for the City of York until 1998.

Runnymede has a population of 400 students and has a variety of course offerings ranging from computer technology to co-operative education, from modern languages to music.

This school is one of the oldest active surviving high schools in the former City of York and is second oldest high school in York, the other being Weston Collegiate Institute to the north. The motto of this school is Vestigia Nulla Retrorsum ("No Steps Back").

== History ==
Runnymede High School was completed and officially opened on November 11, 1927, by the York High School Township Board, although classes had begun on September 6 for 250 students and a staff of 10 teachers led by Principal Bruce W. Clark. The original Collegiate Gothic building was designed by Charles Wellington Smith and consisted of eight classrooms, three science labs, an auditorium, a library, a gymnasium, a cafeteria and a locker area on three floors. The school adopted the current name, Runnymede Collegiate Institute, in 1928.

Significant additions to the building were completed in 1928, 1958 and 1966. The building now includes over 30 classrooms, a swimming pool, two gyms, computers labs and a large cafeteria.

The school was built on land, which had belonged to John Scarlett. His estate was called "Runnymede" after the field of Runnymede, where King John of England signed Magna Carta. The school's colours, red and white, derive partly from Scarlett's name, and also from the fact that the school opened in the year of Canada's Diamond Jubilee. Owing to their red school jackets, Runnymede students came to be known as Redmen in the 1930s. Over time an Indian head logo was adopted to go with the name. The Redmen name and logo were retired in 1994.

In 1998, RCI became part of the newly amalgamated Toronto District School Board after the dissolution of YBE.

== Clubs ==
Runnymede Collegiate Institute offers a number of different clubs and extracurricular activities. Some of the activities that have run in recent years are listed below:

- Badminton Club
- Baseball (boys and girls)
- Basketball (varsity, junior and senior)
- Black Students Association club
- Cheerleading
- Cross Country
- Dance Club
- FIRST Robotics Competition (Robotics) Team 1310
- Hockey (co-ed)
- Celebration Club
- Leadership
- Math Club
- Mental Health and Wellness Club
- GSA Club
- Right to Play
- Soccer (junior and senior)
- Swim Team
- Tech Crew
- Track and Field
- Volleyball (Junior and senior girls, co-ed)
- Yearbook Club
- Muslim student association
- Anime Club

The Robotics Team is the biggest club in Runnymede with over 60 students every year.

== Mountview Alternative School ==
Mountview Alternative School is a Kindergarten to Grade 8 school that shares space with Runnymede Collegiate Institute and Humbercrest Nursery School. The school was founded in 1983 in the Keele Street Public School building and has approximately 100 students. Mountview was relocated to its present location at Runnymede Collegiate in 2018.

== Notable alumni ==
- Frederick George Topham - recipient of the Victoria Cross in World War II
- Dwight Drummond - news anchor on CBC Toronto
- P. K. Subban - Defenceman, Nashville Predators
- Jim Peplinski - Captain of the Calgary Flames during their 1988-89 Stanley Cup Victory
- Lori-Ann Muenzer - 2004 Olympic Gold Medalist in the Women's Sprint cycling
- James Milton Ham, scientist and 10th President of the University of Toronto
- Claude Bissell, Canada's youngest university president
- Charlotte Sullivan, actress
- Dick Aldridge, Linebacker, Toronto Argonauts & Hamilton Tigercats
- Ted Woloshyn, CFRB Radio Host
- Howard Moscoe, city councillor
- Gayle Christie, former York mayor
- Katie Telford, Chief of Staff to Prime Minister Justin Trudeau
- Annamie Paul, Leader, Green Party of Canada

== See also ==
- Education in Ontario
- List of secondary schools in Ontario
