= Gayle Christie =

Mayor of York
- In office 1978–1982
- Preceded by: Philip White
- Succeeded by: Alan Tonks

Personal details
- Born: Gayle Ingle; 1940 (age 85–86)
- Died: August 14, 2024 Toronto
- Spouse: John Christie (div.)
- Children: Kelly (deceased); John; Robert; Rebecca
- Occupation: Consultant

Gayle Christie (née Ingle; born c. 1940) is a former politician in Toronto, Ontario. She was mayor of the borough of York, Ontario from 1978 to 1982.

== Background ==
Christie was born in Garson, Ontario just outside of Sudbury. Her parents were John and Muriel Ingle. Her father owned a Toronto insurance company. She attended Runnymede Collegiate Institute. She married John Christie with whom she had four children.

== Politics ==
Christie was elected as a school trustee in 1972. She served until 1976 when she was elected alderman in ward 7 in the borough of York, Ontario. In the 1978 municipal election she ran for the position of mayor and defeated incumbent Philip White by 1,682 votes. Defeated mayor White commented on her victory. He said, "Christie had a well-oiled election machine. They had the troops. That's what you need and I didn't have them." She was re-elected in 1980. In 1982, she was narrowly defeated by Alan Tonks by a margin of 105 votes. Christie had been criticized during the campaign for her handling of labour negotiations which led to a garbage strike and a work slowdown by civic employees. While recounts were only done for margins under 100 votes, Christie pressed for a recount nonetheless. In a negotiation between Tonks and Christie, they were both allowed to open the ballot boxes to scrutinize the contents. While Christie hinted at forcing a new election, she eventually relinquished the mayor's chair to Tonks.

In 1984, she attempted to become nominated as the federal Progressive Conservative candidate in the riding of Eglinton-Lawrence. She was defeated by Dan La Caprara after three ballots by a vote of 410 to 317. De Caprara lost to incumbent Roland de Corneille in the June election.

In 1985, she tried for another nomination, this time as the provincial PC candidate in the riding of Eglinton. She lost to David McFadden who went on to win the riding in the May election.

== After politics ==
In 1985, she was appointed as a director to the board of Air Canada by Brian Mulroney. Christie was a long-time friend of Mulroney's and worked as co-chair of his leadership campaign in 1984. The appointment was widely seen as a patronage appointment. After the appointment, Christie jokingly referred to her driver's licence as a qualification for her appointment. The humour did not go over well with Mulroney's aides.

In the 1990s, she started working as a government relations consultant and lobbyist. In 2004, she became president of the Yorktown Child and Family Centre.
