= Walter Saunders =

Canadian politician (1901–1969)

Reeve of York
- In office January 1962 – December 1963
- Preceded by: Frederick Charles Taylor
- Succeeded by: Jack Mould

Personal details
- Born: 1901
- Died: October 5, 1969 (aged 67–68)
- Occupation: travel agent

Walter Saunders (1901 – October 5, 1969) was a municipal politician in York, a municipality of Metropolitan Toronto, Ontario, Canada. A member of the township council throughout the 1950s and 1960s, he served for one year as reeve (mayor), also sitting on Metropolitan Toronto Council.

Walter Saunders Memorial Park along the York Beltline Trail between Dufferin Street and Times Road is named after him.

== Early life ==
He was born in Nantwich, England, and came to Canada with his family in 1906 and had served in World War I.

== Career ==
Saunders was first elected to York Township Council in 1950, after spending six years as a school trustee, including two years as school board chairman. He gained a reputation as "watchdog of the treasury" and an opponent of property tax increases, particularly due to their impact on senior citizens living on a fixed income.

While serving as councillor for Ward 2, the township council voted Saunders in as reeve in January 1962 to complete the term of Frederick Charles Taylor, who had died in office. He had previously run for reeve in 1955 and 1956, but was defeated by 300 votes and 935 votes respectively. As reeve, Saunders favoured the construction of "posh" high-rise apartments in order to generate new property tax revenue, opposed the planned Spadina Expressway as a "waste of money", and favoured "some kind of amalgamation" among the municipalities of Metropolitan Toronto. He began using an answering service a few weeks after becoming reeve because "cranks" and "crackpots" calling him at home at all hours of the night were robbing him of his sleep.

A travel agent by profession, who had also worked as a printer, Saunders had run for reeve in previous general elections but had not been successful. Saunders did not run for the position of reeve in the December 3, 1962 Toronto municipal election and was instead elected in his previous position as councillor until retiring in 1964. He returned to council as alderman in the 1966 municipal election and remained on council until his death from cancer in October 1969.
