= New Capitalist Party =

Political party in Canada

The New Capitalist Party was a short-lived political party in Canada that nominated three candidates in Toronto-area ridings in the 1965 federal election.

The party was founded by Frank O'Hearn, who had run for Mayor of Toronto unsuccessfully in the 1947 Toronto municipal election, and had founded a religious organization called the Order of God-like People in 1961.

In the election, O'Hearn won 600 votes in York—Scarborough riding, 0.4% of the total. Doug Tilley won 235 votes in York—Humber riding, 0.6% of the total. Ferris Kendall-Leicester won 174 votes in Spadina riding, 0.8% of the total.

The party may have subscribed to monetary reform of social credit parties. Kendall-Leicester had been a candidate for the Social Credit Party of Canada, which had largely collapsed in English-speaking Canada prior to this election.

O'Hearn stated that the government's banking policy had robbed Canadians of $1,000 each, and that his party would get it back "by hook or by crook". Asked to clarify this statement, he indicated that, "If we can't free ourselves by legal means, then we must resort to our inherent rights, even war if necessary." Tilley stated that the banking system is the root of all evil in Canada. The party was also opposed to the Bank of Canada's policy of burning old banknotes, arguing that they should be kept in circulation.

The party also promised to reduce the 11% federal sales tax, and the national debt, and cut the price of a loaf of bread to 5 cents.

== Sources ==
- The Globe and Mail and Toronto Star, October 1965.

== See also ==
- List of Canadian political parties
