= Weston, Toronto =

Weston
- Neighbourhood
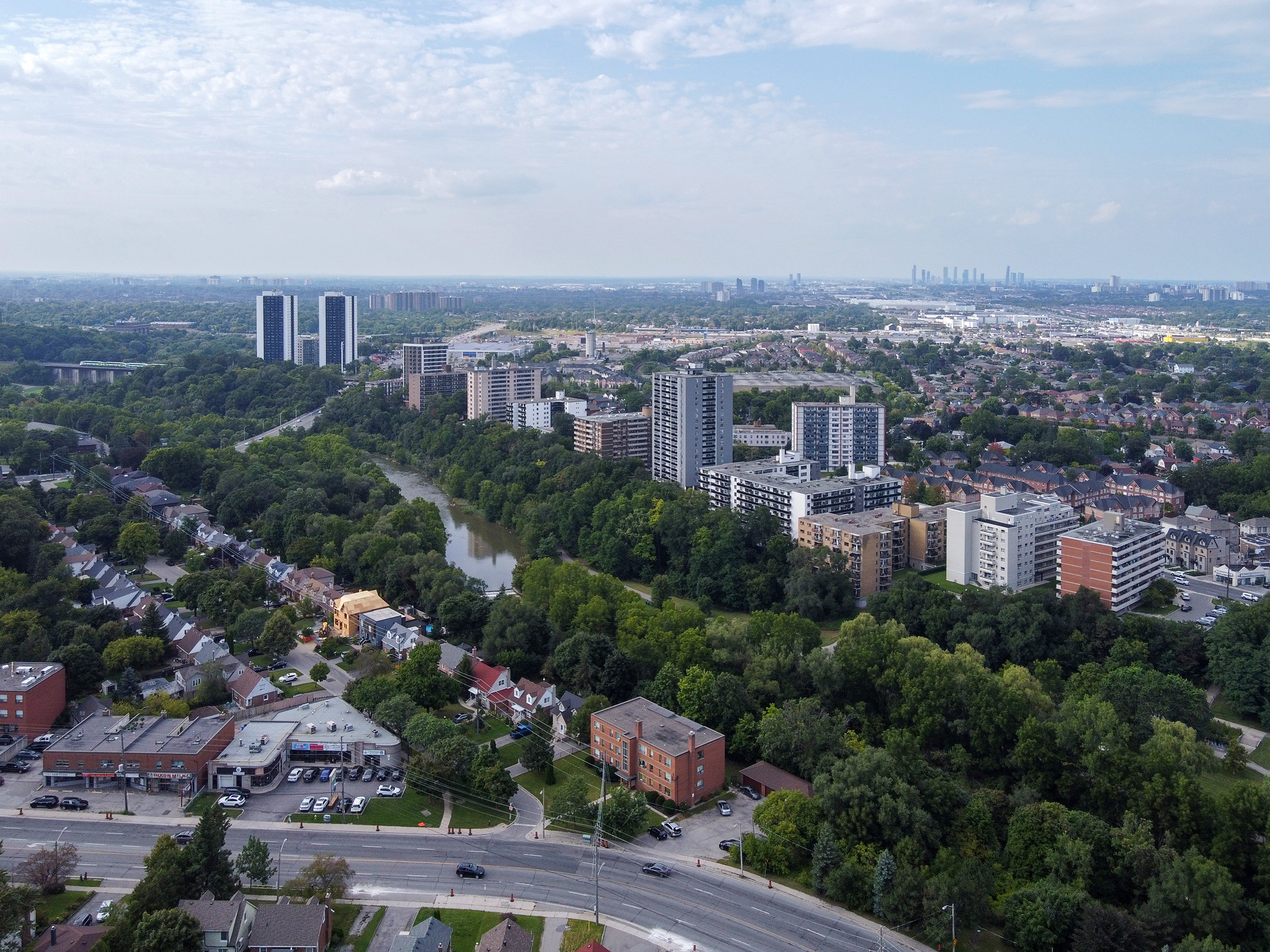
- High rises along Weston Road from the Humber River

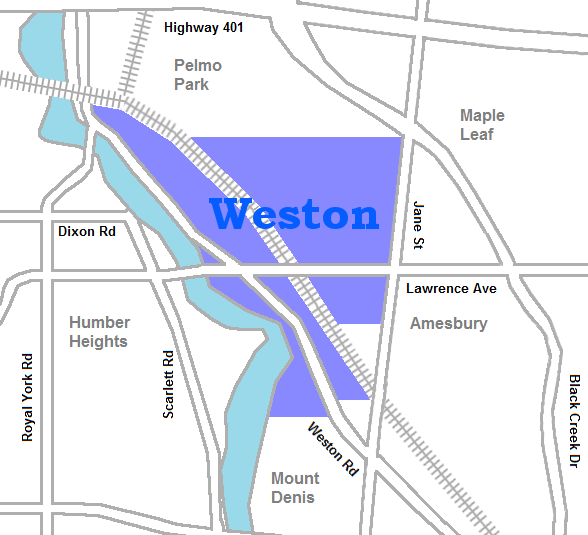

- Location within Toronto
- Coordinates: 43°42′3.56″N 79°31′10.92″W
- Country: Canada
- Province: Ontario
- City: Toronto
- Settled: c. 1790s
- Incorporated: 1881 (Village); 1914 (Town)
- Changed division: 1954 Metropolitan Toronto from York County
- Annexed: 1967 into Borough of York
- Changed municipality: 1998 Toronto from York

Government
  - MP: Ahmed Hussen (York South—Weston)
  - MPP: Mohamed Firin(York South—Weston)
  - Councillor: Frances Nunziata (Ward 11 York South-Weston)

Population (2016)
  - Total: 17,992

Weston is a neighbourhood and former town in Toronto, Ontario, Canada. The neighbourhood is situated in the northwest of the city, south of Highway 401 and Highway 400/Black Creek Drive, east of the Humber River, north of Eglinton Avenue, and west of Jane Street. The eponymous Weston Road, just north of Lawrence Avenue is the historic core of Weston, with many small businesses and services. Weston was incorporated as a village in the 19th century and was absorbed into the Borough of York in the late 1960s. York itself was amalgamated into Toronto in 1998. Weston is one of the few former towns and villages in Toronto located in a generally suburban setting, although it is contiguous with the inner city to the southeast along Weston Road. It is also one of the few not developed as a planned satellite town, as is the case with Leaside or New Toronto.

== Description ==
Weston's building stock consists mostly of Victorian homes east of the railway with apartment and condominium towers on Weston Road overlooking the Humber River valley. Weston's main shopping district is located on Weston Road between Church Street in the north and Wilby Crescent (just south of Lawrence Avenue) in the south. Most buildings in this area reflect early-mid-20th century Ontario town architecture, brick buildings with decorative masonry. The area has a noteworthy library (previously a Mechanics' Institute and Carnegie library). The community is dotted with grand old churches with architectural significance. The oldest existing building in Weston today is Inverary Cottage, built in 1835. The oldest commercial building is the Weston Plank Road building on Weston Road. There has been a recent move in Weston to designate certain areas as a historical district.

Most streets in Weston are lined with tall mature trees, some well over 100 years old. This is more common east of the railway tracks. Recently, there has been some infill development on former industrial and commercial lands bringing some new housing stock to the area.

== History ==
Weston is located in the traditional territory of several indigenous First Nations: the Wendat, the Haudenosaunee, and the Mississaugas. There are no known remains of any indigenous settlements in the Weston area, although there were settlements further south on the Humber River (named by the British after the well-known Humber estuary in Yorkshire, England) nearer Lake Ontario and there are traditional paths along the river.

After the establishment of Upper Canada, the first European settlement in the Weston area took place in the 1790s, when a saw mill was built on the west side of the Humber River in the then Etobicoke Township. In 1815, James Farr, a prominent local mill owner, named the growing settlement after his birthplace, Weston, Hertfordshire. Weston initially developed along both sides of the river until a disastrous flood in 1850 destroyed the west bank settlement. The former west bank settlement is now the site of the Weston Golf and Country Club. Improvements to Main Street (later renamed as part of Weston Road) and the 1856 arrival of the Grand Trunk Railway brought growth on the east side, then part of York Township.

The first post office was opened in 1842. The first library opened in 1858, a Mechanic's Institute. In 1865, the Trinity College School opened, founded by William Arthur Johnson. It was located in Weston near the old Mill and at a home further north until 1867. The institution later relocated to Port Hope, Ontario in 1868.

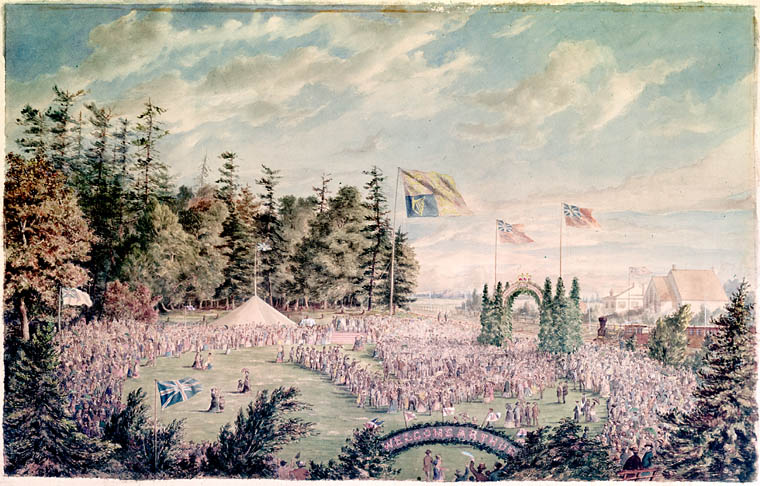
In 1869, Prince Arthur, Duke of Connaught and Strathearn visited Weston to attend the sod turning ceremony for the construction of the Toronto, Grey and Bruce Railway.

A second railway company arrived in 1869. On October 5, 1869, Prince Arthur, Duke of Connaught and Strathearn attended the sod turning ceremony for the construction of the Toronto, Grey and Bruce Railway. The spade which he used for the event is kept in the public library.

The town of Weston grew; over the 19th, it century became an important industrial centre for the Toronto area. The symbol adopted for the town, an outline of an old-fashioned bicycle, was based on this history of manufacturing and especially the old CCM bicycle factory on Lawrence Avenue just east of Weston Road. Models of bicycles now hang from the streetlights along Weston Road.

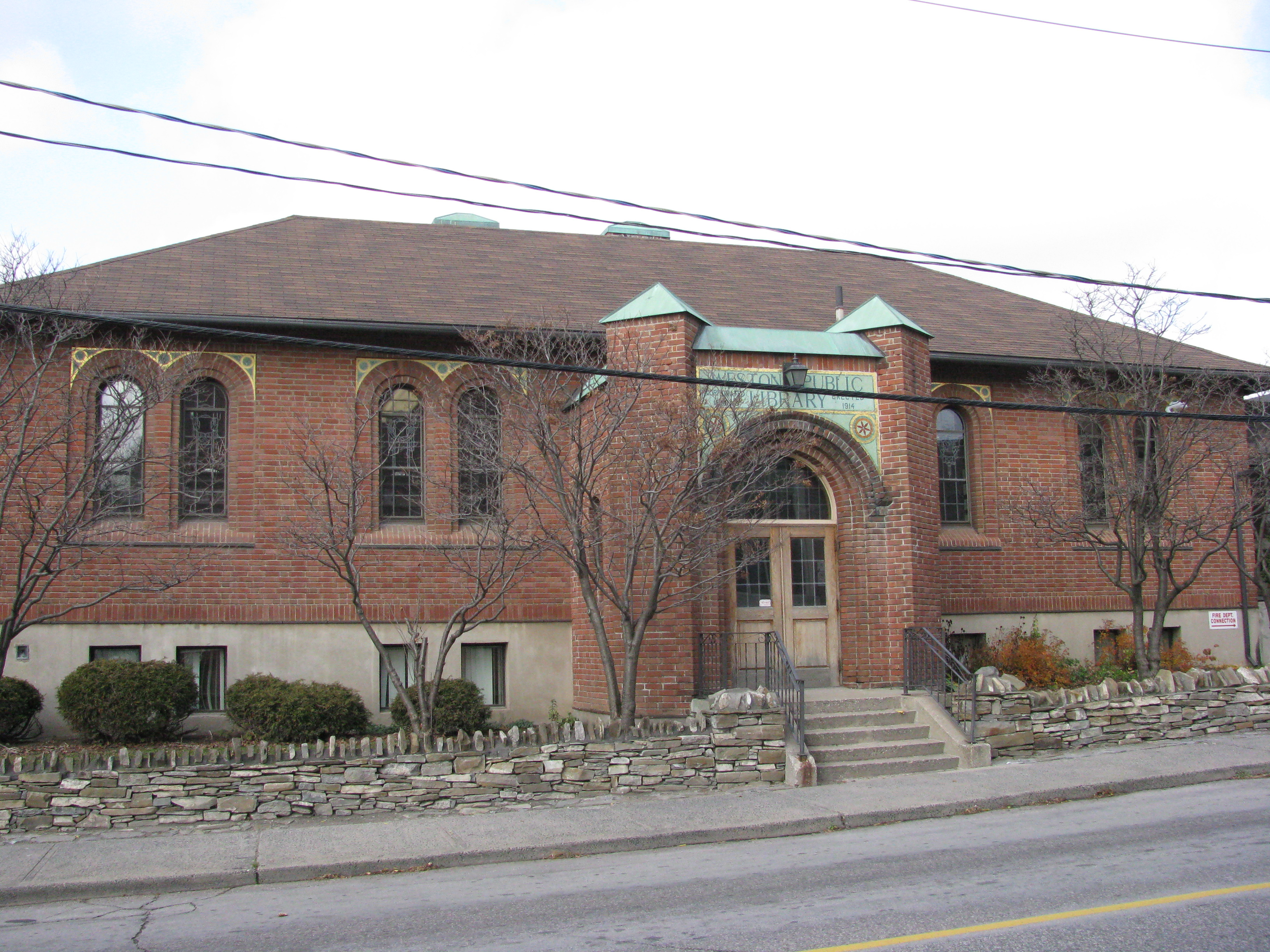
The Weston Branch of the Toronto Public Library. The building was erected as a Carnegie library in 1914.

Weston was incorporated as a village in 1881, and then as a town in 1914. In 1914, the town also saw the opening of Weston Public Library, a Carnegie library. This building is now recognized with heritage status.

In October 1954, Hurricane Hazel flooded the Humber River valley, causing death and destruction of property. The section of Raymore Drive adjacent to the river was washed away, as was the Lawrence Avenue bridge. In response, low-lying areas in the Humber River valley were converted to parkland and property zoning standards were changed across Ontario to avoid building encroachment on floodplains. There is a memorial in the south end of Lions Park near a pedestrian bridge which incorporates the original footing of a bridge that once crossed the Humber. The other footing of the bridge is the square chunk of concrete that is in the middle of the river nearby.

In 1967, it became part of the Borough (later City) of York. In 1998, York was in turn amalgamated with the five other members of Metropolitan Toronto, (Toronto, Etobicoke, North York, East York, and Scarborough) in the new "megacity" of Toronto. Vocal lobbying at the time allowed Weston to retain many street names which are exact duplicates of downtown streets, including Church Street, King Street and John Street.

On April 26, 2013, a fire was accidentally started at 2304 Weston Road, due to tar during roof construction.

=== Airport link controversy ===
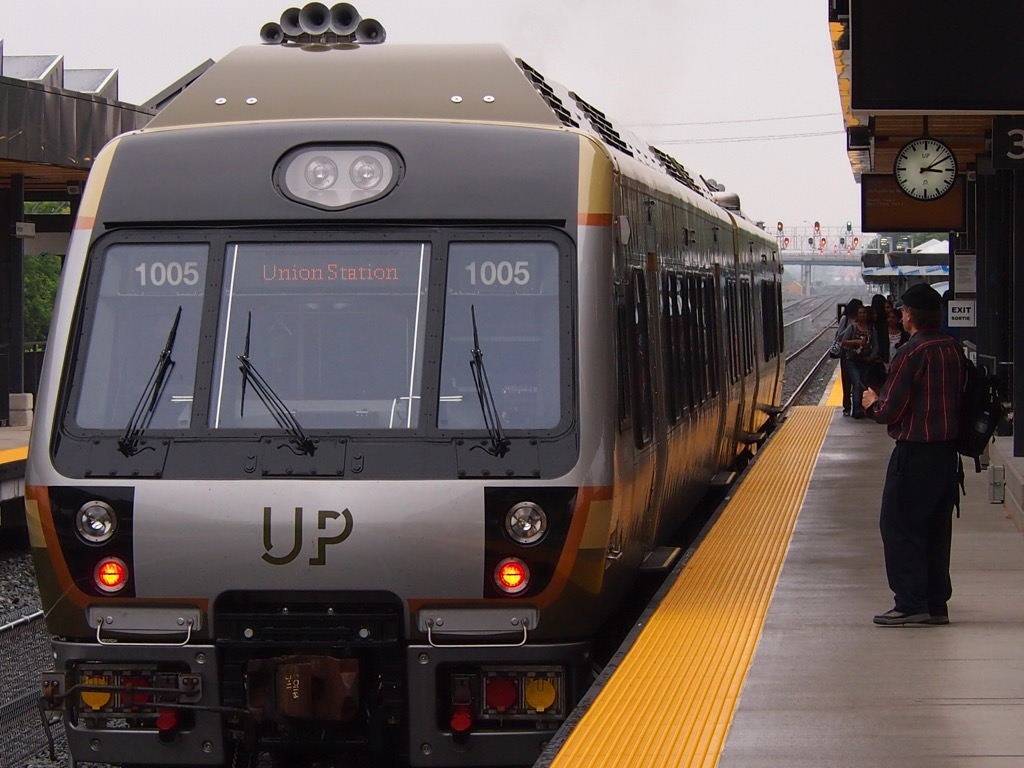
Union Pearson Express train at Weston GO Station. Worries that the airport rail link's tracks would bisect the community eventually led to the tracks going into a trench, with bridges overhead to prevent the bisecting.

The Union Pearson Express between Toronto Pearson International Airport and Union Station downtown was a hot political issue in Weston. It had originally been proposed for completion by 2009. Weston is currently a station stop on the Kitchener line operated by GO Transit and additional airport trains would stop there. The link would see the construction of three additional tracks through the neighbourhood and increased rail traffic more than fourfold. Community activists worried about how the link would sever the community (vehicle traffic on John Street will be permanently blocked from crossing the tracks, replaced by a pedestrian bridge) and the possibility of lower future property values due to increased noise and diesel fumes.

It was an issue during the Canadian federal election held on January 23, 2006, when incumbent Liberal Member of Parliament, Alan Tonks, supported the link, while the other candidates opposed it. It was also an issue in the February 2007 provincial by-election, where all local candidates came out against the link, but which was still supported by the governing Liberals. The Weston Community Coalition (WCC) had proposed a subway line as an alternative to run through the Weston rail corridor to the airport that would have stops along the way which would serve many communities throughout Toronto and be operated by the TTC rather than a private company. Various other alternatives were presented by community activists such as an Eglinton subway to the airport, an LRT alternative, or a route down Highway 427.

In the end, the tracks went into a trench with bridges overhead to prevent bisecting the neighbourhood. A "rail deck park" allowed the expansion of a Toronto Catholic school playground over the tracks.

== Demographics ==
Federal census population history of Weston
Year	Pop.	±%
1891	1,194	—
1901	1,083	−9.3%
1911	1,875	+73.1%
1921	3,166	+68.9%
1931	4,723	+49.2%
1941	5,740	+21.5%
1951	8,677	+51.2%
1956	9,543	+10.0%
1961	9,715	+1.8%
1966	11,047	+13.7%
Source: Statistics Canada

In 2016, the Weston neighbourhood was home to 17,992 residents. 60% of the population speak English as their first language, 6.4% speak Spanish, 4.8% speak Portuguese, 4.3% speak Somali and 3.1% speak Italian.

Major racial and ethnic populations (2016):

- 38.0% White; 8.8% Italian, 8.3% British, 7.4% Scottish
- 33.6% Black; 13.1% Jamaican, 6.0% Somali, 4.9% other African Canadian (including Black Nova Scotian)
- 7.7% Latin American (of any race)
- 4.3% South Asian
- 3.3% Filipino

== Transportation ==
Main throughfares serving Weston are Lawrence Avenue West and Weston Road. A number of local roads in Weston resulted in name duplication after Toronto amalgamation in 1998:

- John Street - a residential street from Jane Street to Weston Road has same name as the more famous John Street. The section just east of S Station Street is now cut off after Union Pearson Express was built; the previous level crossing replaced with pedestrian bridge over trench with tracks below.
- King Street - a residential street from Jane Street to Weston Road has same name as the more famous King Street downtown.
- Church Street - a residential street from Jane Street to Weston Road has same name as the more famous Church Street downtown.

=== Public transportation ===
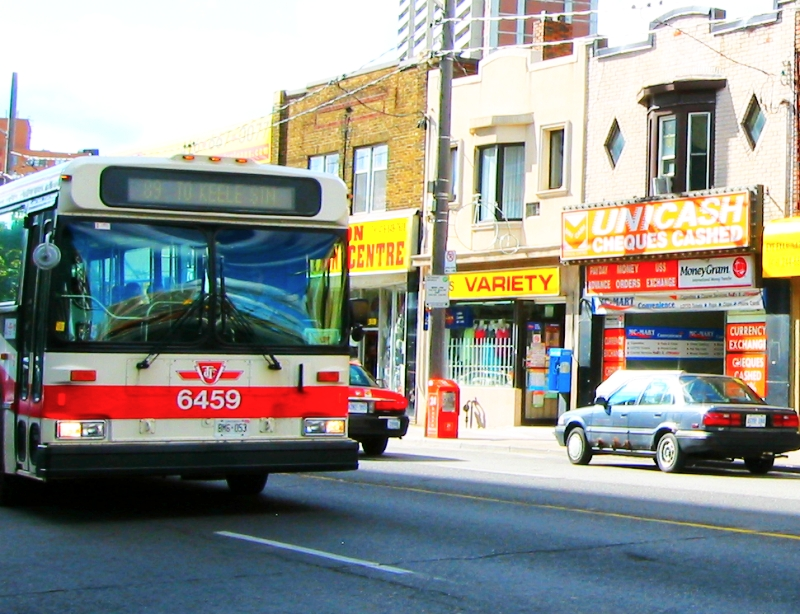
The 89 Weston Toronto Transit Commission bus along Weston Road. The 89 Weston is one of several bus routes that pass through Weston.

The Toronto Transit Commission (TTC) runs several bus routes through the area, linking to the subway system. The 32 Eglinton West, 35 Jane, 52 Lawrence West, 59 Maple Leaf, 73 Royal York, 79 Scarlett, and 89 Weston all pass through the neighbourhood.

As of January 2012, all TTC bus routes serving Weston are accessible. Routes 52 and 352 were the final TTC bus routes to be made accessible, with the retirement of the last GMC New Look "Fishbowl" buses in December 2011. Although all bus routes are accessible, individual stops along the routes may not meet accessibility standards.

The Metrolinx Weston GO Station is located at Weston Road and Lawrence Avenue. The station is served by the Kitchener line (which connects Kitchener, Ontario to downtown Toronto during rush hours) and the Union Pearson Express (all-day service between Toronto Pearson International Airport and downtown Toronto). The Weston GO Station is wheelchair accessible.

== Recreation ==
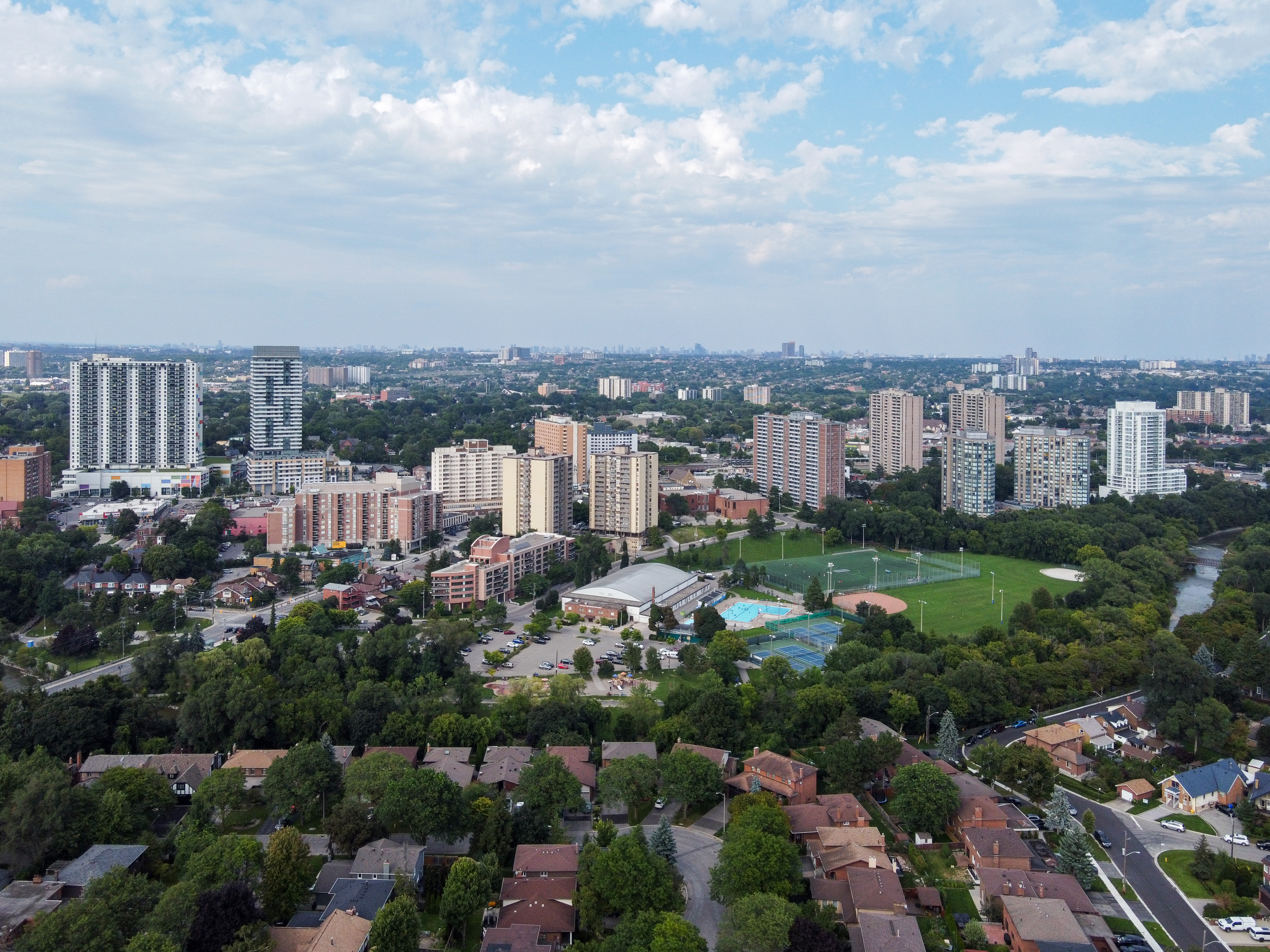
Weston Lions Park

The Weston Farmers' Market opens weekly from mid-May to the end of October near the centre of Weston. The Weston BIA also hosts a Harvest Festival around Thanksgiving in October, and the Weston Santa Claus Parade each November.

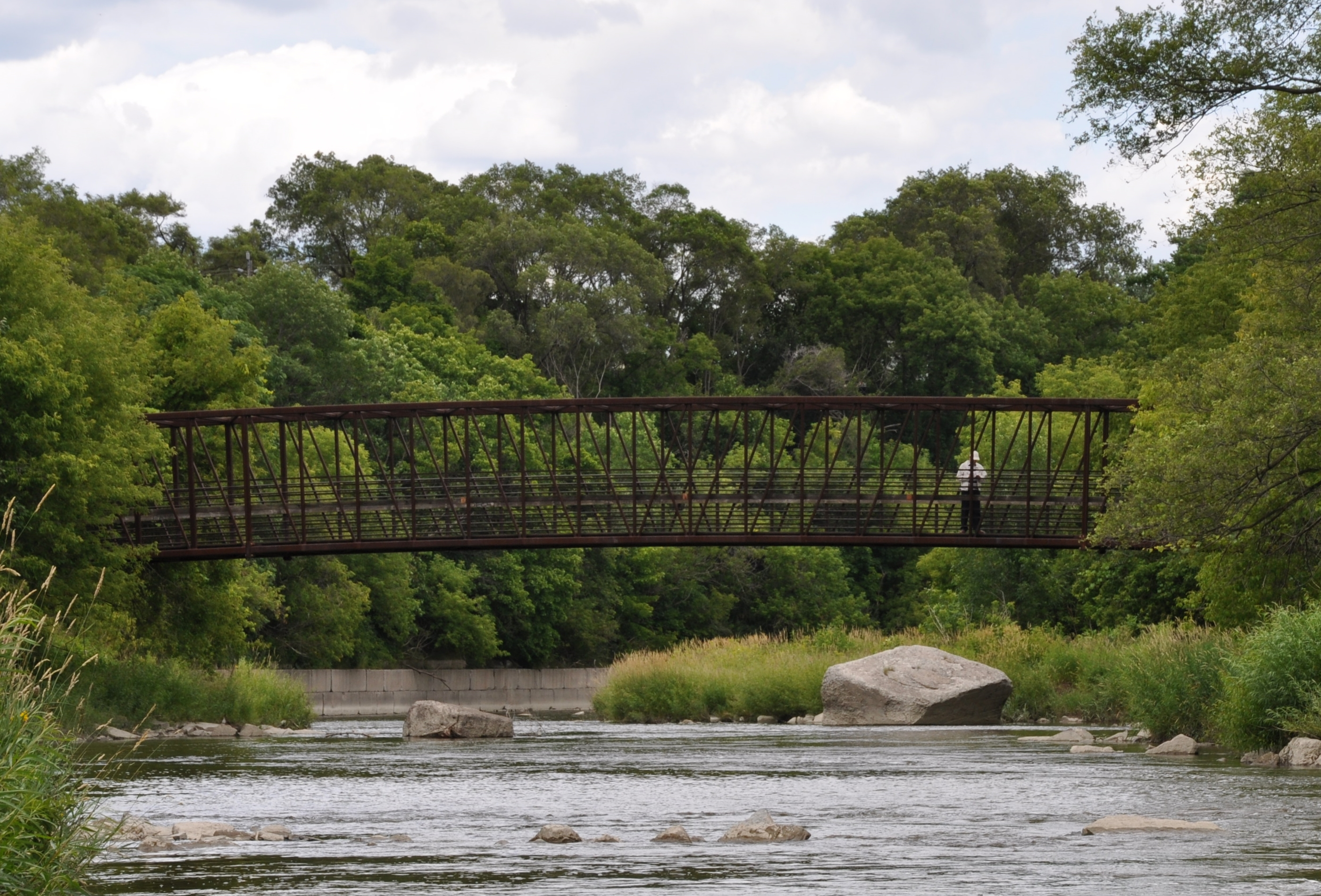
View of the Humber River footbridge south of Lawrence Avenue. Weston has a number of small parks along the Humber River Valley.

Weston has many small parks throughout but most notable is Cruickshank Park in the Humber River valley with many mature trees and paved bicycle paths lined with large weeping willow trees. The bicycle path continues south to Lake Ontario. Sometimes salmon can be seen swimming upstream in the river. The park has a population of beaver as can be seen from the tell-tale marks left behind on trees. In order to protect some trees, park staff have wrapped the tree trunks with wire screen in some areas. There are also some frogs closer to the water's edge and garter snakes hidden away in the more secluded areas. Canada geese, loons, mallards and seagulls are a common sight. Herons have also been spotted looking for fish in the river.

In some areas of the park, you can see exposed sedimentary rock in the walls of the valley, made visible by the action of glaciers that carved out the valley during the last glacial period about 20,000 years ago. The same rock was used to build many stone retaining walls throughout the town; an example of this use can be seen on the south end of the Lawrence Avenue bridge in the north end of Lions Park.

Weston Lions Park, located south of Lawrence Avenue, fills 22.13 acres (89,600 m^{2}) and contains facilities for playing football, rugby union, soccer, tennis, and baseball, as well as an ice rink, swimming pool, basketball court and skatepark.

=== Weston Arena ===
Originally as Weston Arena, it is now known as either Weston Lions Arena or Weston Lions Recreation Arena. The arena was proposed on what was the Weston Fairgrounds in 1944, opened in 1949 and gained a pool in 1959.

The arena hosted the Toronto Dixie Beehives of the Ontario Junior Hockey League from 2007 to 2009. The arena currently hosts the Weston Minor Hockey League and the Weston Dodgers.

== Reeves of the Village of Weston ==
- 1881-1886 William Tyrrell
- 1886-1889 Thomas R. Wadsworth
- 1892-1894 William Tyrrell
- 1895-1897 Jacob Bull
- 1898-1900 Dr. W.J. Charlton
- 1902 J. Conron
- 1903-1906 Jacob Bull
- 1907 Dr. E.F. Irwin
- 1908-1913 R.J. Bull
- 1914 Dr. E.F. Irwin

== Mayors of the Town of Weston ==
The mayor and council sat at Weston Town Hall (Dufferin Hall) at corner of Little Avenue and Weston Road (since demolished and now a parking lot).

- 1914-1918 Dr. W. J. Charlton
- 1919-1920 John Gardhouse - prominent cattle breeder who was inducted into the Canadian Agricultural Hall of Fame, and co-founder of the Royal Agricultural Winter Fair. Served on Etobicoke's town council, including three terms as reeve, prior to moving to Weston, and as Warden of York County. Later served as chair of the Toronto Board of Education in 1917. In 2003, his neighbourhood organized to have his home and stable designated a heritage site and save it from demolition.
- 1921-1925 Robert John Flynn
- 1926-1928 George Sainsbury
- 1929-1930 A. Lorne Coulter
- 1931 W. J. Pollett
- 1932-1934 Sam J. Totten
- 1935-1936 Frank Walton Mertens
- 1937-1939 George Benjamin Evans
- 1940-1942 Gordon S. Harris
- 1942-1945 John P. Allan
- 1946-1948 Thomas Dougherty
- 1949 Kenneth L. Thompson - first elected to Weston council in 1939. Served a term as Warden of York County in 1948. Ran unsuccessfully as a Liberal candidate in the 1949, 1953, and 1957 federal elections. Thompson owned his own insurance company and was an underwriter for Canada Life. While warden, he was instrumental in introducing trolley buses into Toronto's transit system. He served as chairman of the York Planning Board in the 1960s.
- 1950-1954 Richard C. Seagrave- born in London, England, Seagrave came to Canada at the age of 2. At 15, he started working for the Great North-Western Telegraph Company (later CN Telegraph) rising from office boy to administrative assistant to the general manager. He was also on the board of the Canadian National Exhibition.
- 1955-1958 Harry Clark - Clark suggested renaming the Lakeshore Expressway after Metro Chairman Fred Gardiner
- 1959-1960 Jack L. Holley - a pilot with Trans-Canada Airlines, Holley retired from office as his job did provide him enough time to spend on his mayoralty duties.
- 1961-1964 George W. Bull - a local lawyer, Bull was a member of one of Weston's founding families
- 1965-1966 Charles Wesley Boddington - after amalgamation, he served on York's Board of Control for a term. Boddington lost an arm and a leg during World War II after the bomber he was flying exploded over Düsseldorf, and spent the rest of the war in a POW camp. He set up a motor vehicle licensing bureau in Weston in 1947 which he ran until his death in 1984. He ran as a Progressive Conservative candidate in York West in the 1968 Canadian federal election, placing third. In 1969, he ran for mayor of York, but lost to Phil White. He was named to the Order of Canada in 1977.

== Notable residents ==
- Jason Allison, professional ice hockey player
- Mikey Bustos, YouTuber
- Chuck Crate, leader of the Canadian Union of Fascists
- Dalbello, recording artist, songwriter, multi-instrumentalist and voice actress
- Drake, rapper, singer, songwriter and actor
- Thomas J. Lawson, RCAF pilot and Chief of the Defence Staff 2012–15
- Mike Liut, professional ice hockey player
- Raine Maida, lead vocalist and founding member of Our Lady Peace
- Paul Martini, pairs figure skater and Olympian
- Adam Oates, Hall of Fame professional ice hockey player and former coach
- Bob Pulford, professional ice hockey player and executive
- Craig Ramsay, professional ice hockey coach and former player
- Donovan "Razor" Ruddock, professional boxer
- Joseph Tyrrell, geologist, cartographer and mining consultant
- Elwy Yost, TV Ontario host of Magic Shadows, Saturday Night at the Movies

== In popular culture ==
- The 1980s children's TV series The Edison Twins was filmed and set in Weston.
- Canadian rapper Drake mentions Weston in his 2018 hit single "God's Plan" and has a feature song "Weston Road Flows" on his 2016 album "Views"

== See also ==
- Canada Cycle & Motor Co. Ltd
- Knob Hill Farms
- List of reeves of the former townships and villages in Toronto
- List of oldest buildings and structures in Toronto
- York South—Weston
- Weston Collegiate Institute
- Raymore Drive
