= Frederick Charles Taylor =

Canadian politician

Reeve of York
- In office January 1, 1961 – December 15, 1961
- Preceded by: Christopher Tonks
- Succeeded by: Walter Saunders

Personal details
- Born: 1907 Toronto, Ontario
- Died: December 15, 1961 (aged 53–54)
- Occupation: building contractor

Frederick Charles Taylor (1907 – December 15, 1961) was a Canadian politician. He served as the reeve (mayor) of York, Ontario in 1961. York is now part of Toronto.

== Early life ==
Taylor was born in Toronto and educated at Harbord Collegiate Institute. Before establishing his building company, Taylor had experience as a salesman and contractor.

== Career ==
His political career began in 1951 when he was elected to the school board, earning a position on York Township Council in 1955.

Despite his previous loss as a township council candidate, he ran for the reeveship in 1960, succeeding Tonks by a nearly three-to-one margin. He ran as a reformer during the municipal election. Taylor had been striving to persuade the government to establish a royal commission for investigating corruption in land dealings. In 1956, he proposed an inquiry at township council, but it was rejected. Conducting his own investigation, he discovered many building permits that resulted in the construction of illegal tri-plexes (small three-level apartment buildings). As a township councillor, Taylor opposed numerous land deals that Judge David Sweet's royal commission into alleged corruption in York Township criticized. Taylor, a semi-retired builder, served as a school trustee for four years and a township councillor for three. He received endorsement for the reeveship from the York Township Citizens' Committee. This committee obtained a court order to remove Tonks as reeve, which was ultimately overturned on appeal.

After nearly a year as reeve, Taylor died of a heart attack on December 15, 1961. He was succeeded by Walter Saunders.
