= Philip White (Canadian politician) =

Canadian politician (1923–2013)

Phil White
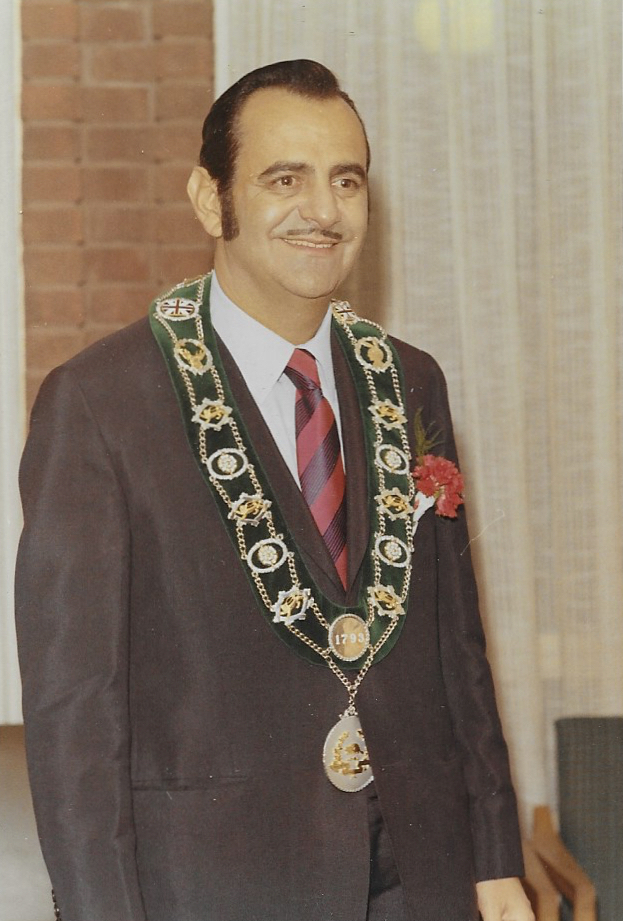
- Inauguration of Mayor Phil White

Mayor of York
- In office 1970–1978
- Preceded by: John Lister Mould
- Succeeded by: Gayle Christie

Metro Toronto Council
- In office 1967—1978, 1980 – 1988

Personal details
- Born: October 23rd, 1923 Toronto
- Died: June 8, 2013 (aged 90) Toronto, Ontario
- Spouse: Helen Strachman (1950 to 1975) Trudy Appleby (1984 - death)
- Education: University of Toronto
- Occupation: Business owner. Pharmacist White's Pharmacy

Philip C. White (October 23, 1923 – June 8, 2013) was the mayor of the Borough and City of York, Ontario in Metropolitan Toronto from 1970 to 1978 and was the municipality's longest-serving mayor. He served on the Metropolitan Council of Toronto before the boroughs (later called cities) were amalgamated and ran for Metro Chair, but eventually put his vote behind Paul Godfrey, which helped Godfrey win. He also served as a Metro Toronto Police Commissioner in the early 1970s.

White attended Harbord Collegiate Institute and the University of Toronto He and his brother, Murray White, owned a community pharmacy in the Borough of York at Jane St. and Corbett Ave., just north of St. Clair Avenue in what was first called the Township of York (a suburb of the City of Toronto) which was annexed with the Town of Weston.

White entered politics in 1959 after the Toronto Telegram and Toronto Star newspapers published stories alleging corruption between private developers and the reeve and township council members of the time. White was eventually approached by the Ward 3 ratepayers, who encouraged him to run against the unpopular incumbent, although he never thought about entering politics. With ratepayer support, he won the election and became the Ward 3 councillor.

After the boroughs became cities and reeves became mayors, councillors became known as aldermen. White served on council for a decade as an alderman and then a controller in the borough and was eventually elected mayor in the December 1, 1969 municipal election; his term began one month later.

White is credited with facilitating "participatory democracy" by involving citizen's groups in the decision making process and supported environmental causes such as cleaning up the Humber River and preserving parkland. White was re-elected twice; first defeating Jack Mould and then Fergy Brown in 1974 and 1976 before losing to Gayle Christie in 1978. He returned to politics in 1980, when he was elected to York's Board of Control, serving until his retirement in 1988.

White died at the age of 90 of a brain hemorrhage. He was also York's first Jewish mayor.

The ice skating arena in Cedarvale Park is now named after him.
