= York, Ontario =

Former city in Ontario, Canada

York
- Dissolved city (lower-tier)
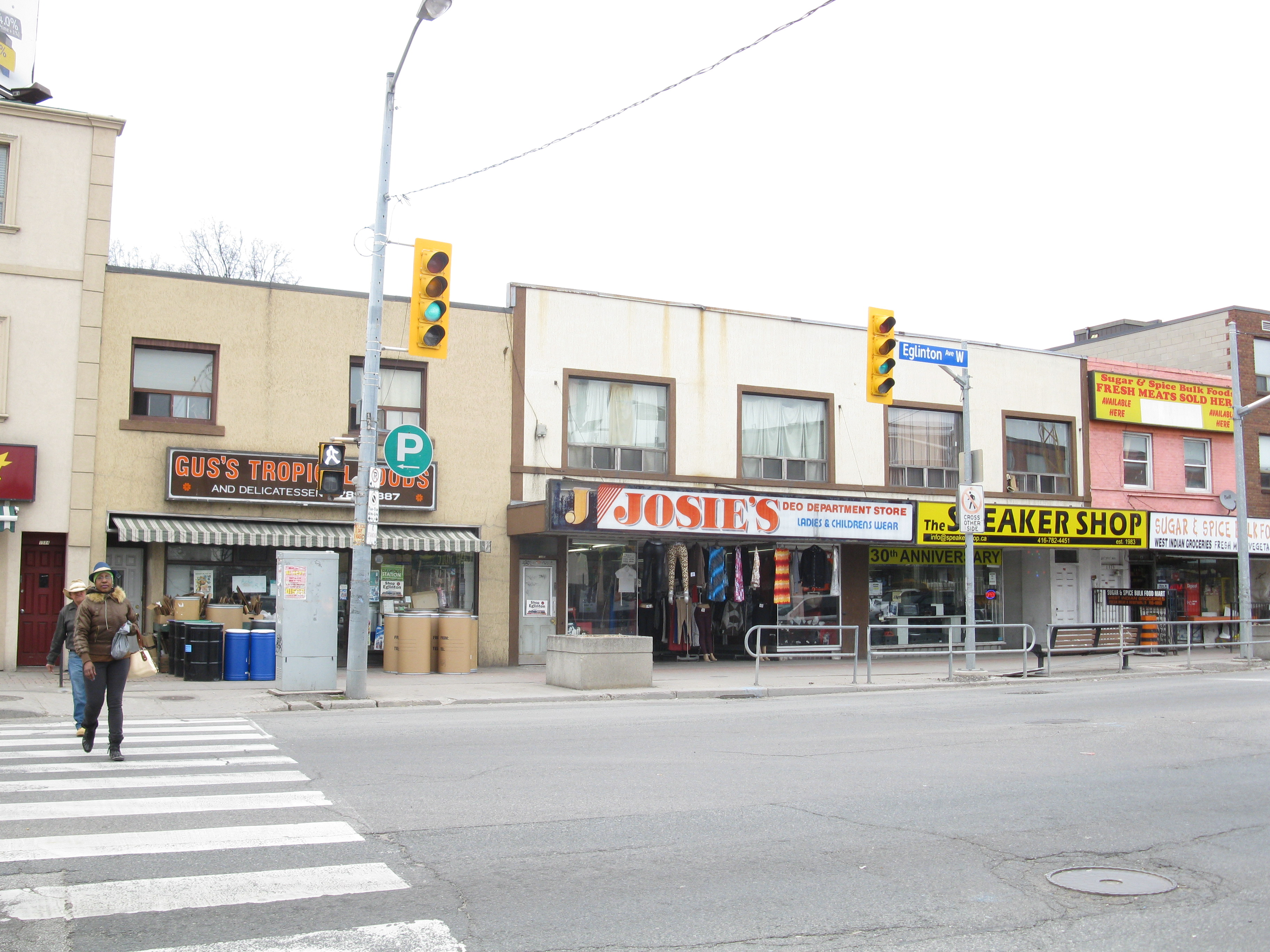
- View of north side of Eglinton Avenue West at Oakwood Avenue in 2013; some of the storefronts were replaced with the main entrance to Oakwood station of Line 5 Eglinton
- Motto: E singulis communitas (Latin for "From individuals, a community")
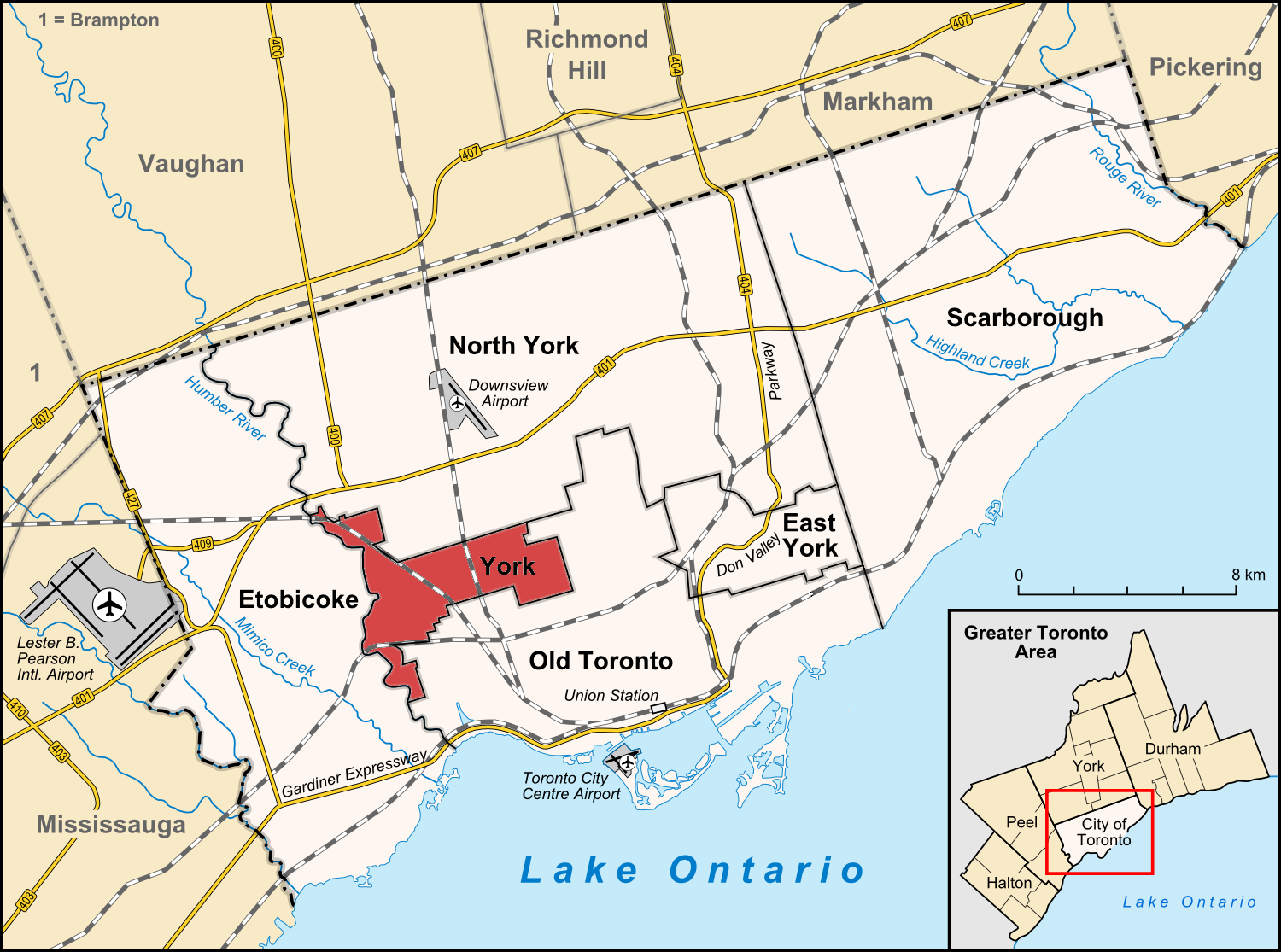
- Location of York (red), as compared with the rest of Toronto.
- Interactive map of York
- Coordinates: 43.690°N 79.478°W
- Country: Canada
- Province: Ontario
- Municipality: Toronto
- Incorporated: 1850 (township)
- Changed division: 1954 Metropolitan Toronto from York County
- Changed status: 1967 (borough); 1983 (city)
- Amalgamated: 1998 into Toronto

Government
  - Councillors: Anthony Perruzza; Stephen Holyday; Vincent Crisanti; Amber Morley; Frances Nunziata
  - MPs: Vince Gasparro (L); Roman Baber (C); Ahmed Hussen (L); Leslie Church (L); Julie Dzerowicz (L)
  - MPPs: Michael Kerzner (PC); Mohamed Firin (PC); Michelle Cooper (PC); Marit Stiles (NDP); Stephanie Smyth (OLP)

Area^{[1]}
  - Total: 23.49 km^{2} (9.07 sq mi)

Population (2021)
  - Total: 146,828
  - Density: 6,250.7/km^{2} (16,189/sq mi)
- Time zone: UTC−5 (EST)
  - Summer (DST): UTC−4 (EDT)
- Area codes: 416, 647, 437, 942

York is a former city within Toronto, Ontario, Canada. It is located northwest of Old Toronto, southwest of North York and east of the Humber River.

Originally formed as York Township, it encompassed the southern section of York County. It was split several times, creating East York and North York. In 1953, it became part of the Metropolitan Toronto federation. It absorbed several municipalities, including Lambton Mills and Weston and was eventually known as the City of York. In 1998, it was dissolved along with Metro Toronto and its constituent municipalities, amalgamated to form the current City of Toronto.

Today, the area is integrated into the multicultural mosaic of Toronto. The area is home today to several ethnic enclaves such as Portuguese, Jamaican and Latin American neighbourhoods.

== History ==
Teiaiagon, settled by the Iroquois on the eastern bank of the Humber River, where Baby Point is now, was the oldest known settlement on the land that would later become York Township.

York Township was first organized in 1793. Its initial boundaries were the Humber River to the west, in the east by what would become Victoria Park Avenue, and in the north by what would become Steeles Avenue. Etobicoke Township and Scarborough Township were located west and east, respectively, while the townships of Vaughan and Markham bordered on the north, and Lake Ontario on the south, minus the small Town of York. It was incorporated by Canada West in 1850 (Canada West later became Ontario in 1867, due to Confederation) within the new County of York.

York Township was home to one of the original Black communities in the Toronto area, which was populated by many African American fugitive slaves. By 1861, the township had the second-largest Black population in the Toronto area, after St. John's Ward, most of whom lived in York Township West (located west of Yonge Street and north of Bloor Street). The legacy of York's original Black community continues today; as of the 2016 Census, 17 percent of York's population is Black, the largest percentage of Toronto's six former municipalities.

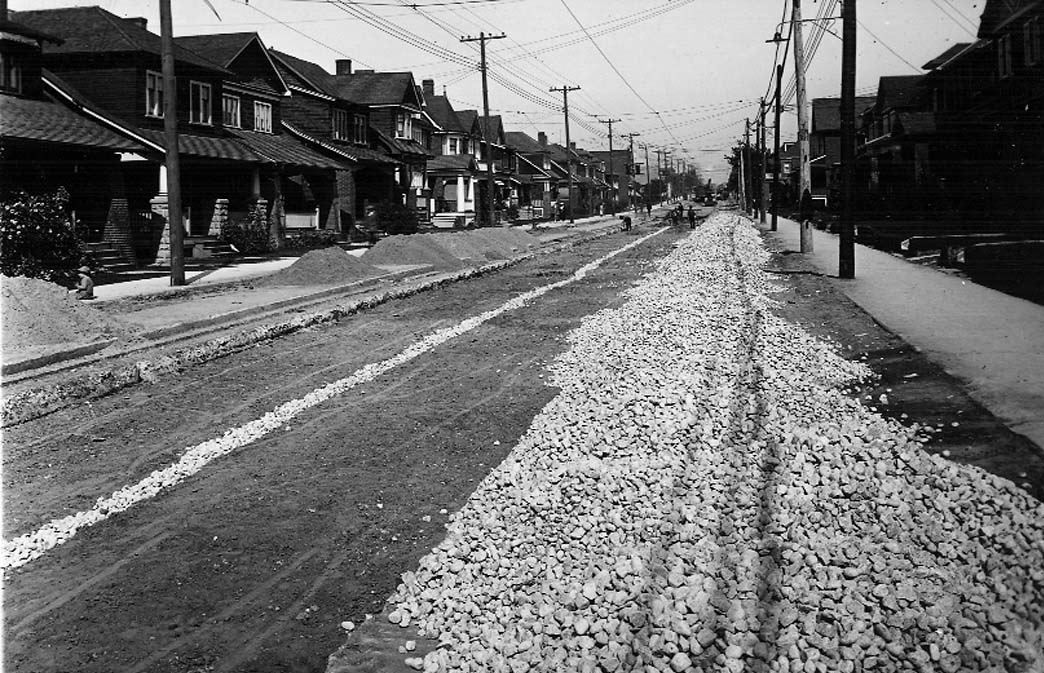
Oakwood Village from Oakwood Avenue, north of St. Clair Avenue in 1924. The area was initially developed as a streetcar suburb.

From the period of 1850 onwards, individual villages developed such as Parkdale (1879) and Brockton (1881), which were later annexed into Toronto. The village of Weston was incorporated in 1882. Toronto Junction and East Toronto were incorporated in 1887, both later annexed by Toronto. The village of North Toronto was incorporated in 1889, annexed by Toronto in 1912. Other parts of York were directly annexed by Toronto, such as "The Annex", Riverdale, Rosedale, Seaton and Sunnyside in the 1880s and Bracondale, Deer Park, Wychwood, The Midway and Balmy Beach after 1905.

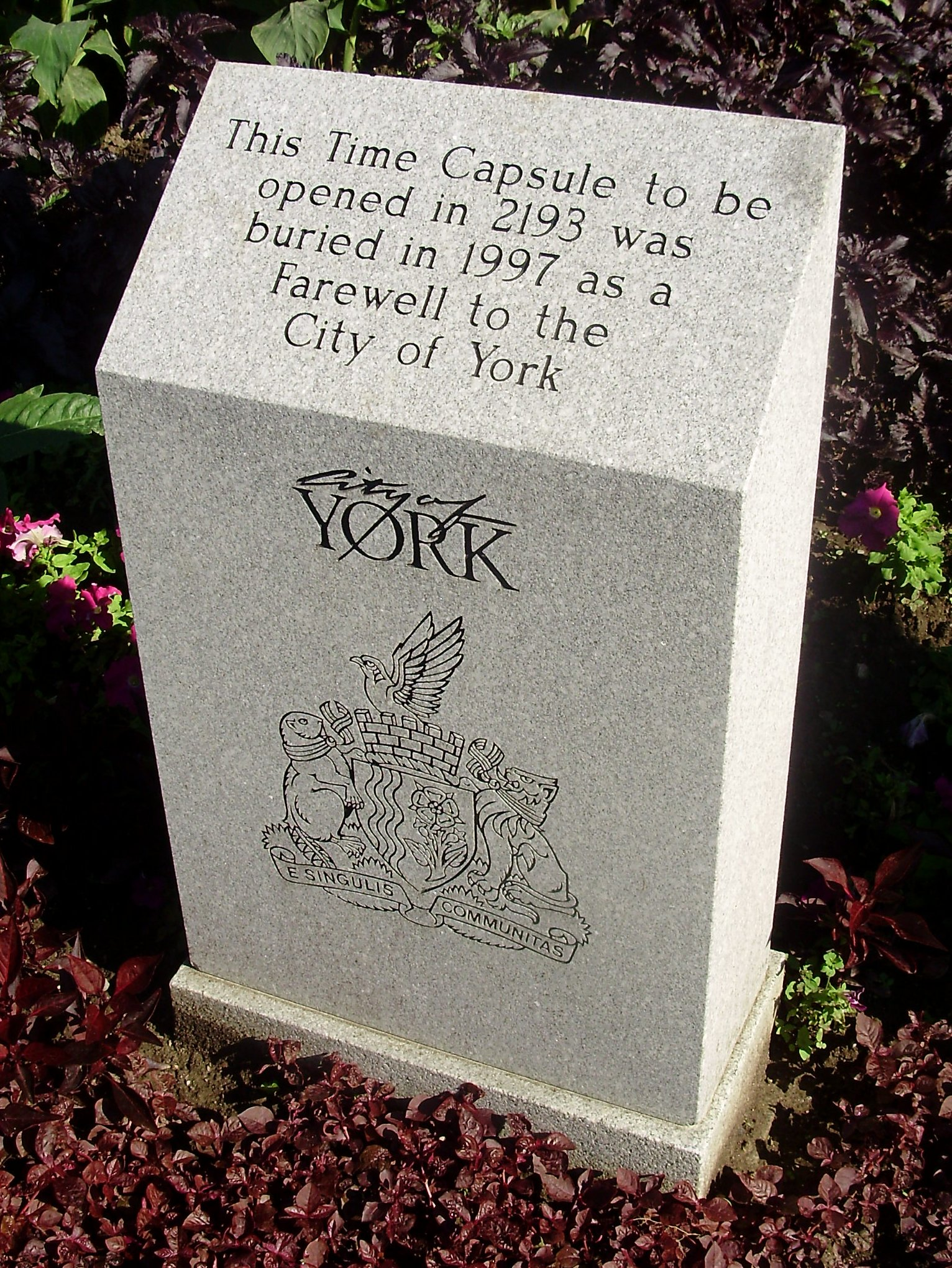
A time capsule outside the York Civic Centre, a building that formerly housed York's City Council. It depicts the city's logo and coat of arms, with the city's motto in Latin.

This pattern of absorption by Toronto ended as the City no longer wanted to take on the servicing costs of new suburbs. The Humewood–Cedarvale neighbourhood was developed in the 1910s to attract development in the growing township. Oakwood Village was also developed during this time. In the 1920s, the character of the township changed, with its southern reaches abutting the city of Toronto taking on a more urban character, compared with the very rural character of the north. The voters of the northern, rural part of York voted to secede, creating the new Township of North York in 1922. This was followed in 1923 by the incorporation of the village of Forest Hill, while the residents of Mount Dennis and Silverthorn voted to remain in York. The remaining two pockets of unincorporated urban development at the north end of the city, were split by the village of North Toronto, which was by then a part of the City of Toronto. Within years, the Province of Ontario saw that this arrangement of having an exclave was impractical, and further subdivided York, creating in 1924 the township of East York out of the eastern pocket.

The Township of York contracted streetcar and bus services from the Toronto Transportation Commission (later became Toronto Transit Commission in 1954), but remained independent from Toronto. During this time, American novelist and journalist Ernest Hemingway resided in the Humewood–Cedarvale community, writing for the Toronto Star.

In 1954, York, along with other municipalities south of Steeles Avenue were severed from York County, forming the new upper-tier government of Metropolitan Toronto. In 1967, it absorbed the town of Weston, and became the Borough of York, later known as the City of York. York was dissolved on 1 January 1998 and its functions amalgamated into the new City of Toronto. Its former council and administrative building, York Civic Centre, is located at 2700 Eglinton Avenue West, between Black Creek Drive and Keele Street, used for courts and other functions. The Etobicoke-York Community Council of Toronto administers minor responsibilities within the limits of York and Etobicoke.

== Neighbourhoods ==
There are several distinct neighbourhoods in the former city, including the former municipality of Weston, which retains its own main street, Weston Road, and several street names duplicated in other districts of Toronto, especially downtown Toronto.

North and west of Oakwood Village is the Fairbank community. Silverthorn is west of Fairbank. Silverthorn (and Fairbank) is described as "Toronto's hidden San Francisco" in reference to its "steep streets, staircases, and unusual views of houses built in what must be the hilliest part of the city." This is due to Toronto's topography being shaped by its deep ravines being similar to the hills of San Francisco, especially in Fairbank and Silverthorn.

The Mount Dennis area of Weston was the base for the former campus of Kodak's Canadian operations from 1912 to 2006. While most of the buildings were demolished, the branch head office has been repurposed for Line 5 Eglinton's Eglinton Maintenance and Storage Facility and Kodak Building 9 was repurposed for Mount Dennis station itself.

Baby Point, between Jane Street and the Humber River, north of Bloor Street, is situated where the former Iroquoian village of Teiaiagon was located. It was formerly part of the Lambton Mills village within York Township.

== Demographics ==
Federal census population history of York
Year	Pop.	±%
1931	69,593	—
1941	81,052	+16.5%
1951	101,582	+25.3%
1956	117,553	+15.7%
1961	129,645	+10.3%
1966	134,674	+3.9%
1971	147,301	+9.4%
1976	141,367	−4.0%
1981	134,617	−4.8%
1986	135,401	+0.6%
1991	140,525	+3.8%
1991A	139,819	−0.5%
1996	146,534	+4.8%
2001	150,255	+2.5%
Source: Statistics Canada

Largest ethnic origin in York by census tract based on the 2021 census

Panethnic groups in York (1996−2021)
Panethnic group	2021 Canadian census (Note: Total of 32 census tracts from 5350150.00 through 5350176.00 in the Toronto CMA, all situated in the former York census subdivision.)		2016 Canadian census (Note: Total of 32 census tracts from 5350150.00 through 5350176.00 in the Toronto CMA, all situated in the former York census subdivision.)		2011 Canadian census (Note: Total of 32 census tracts from 5350150.00 through 5350176.00 in the Toronto CMA, all situated in the former York census subdivision.)		2006 Canadian census (Note: Total of 32 census tracts from 5350150.00 through 5350176.00 in the Toronto CMA, all situated in the former York census subdivision.)		2001 Canadian census		1996 Canadian census	
Panethnic group	Pop.	%	Pop.	%	Pop.	%	Pop.	%	Pop.	%	Pop.	%
European (Note: Statistic includes all persons that did not make up part of a visible minority or an indigenous identity.)	75,695	52.02%	77,935	54.06%	78,920	55.26%	82,405	57.93%	89,840	60.32%	93,800	64.34%
African	24,475	16.82%	23,580	16.36%	21,785	15.25%	21,325	14.99%	21,475	14.42%	19,190	13.16%
Southeast Asian (Note: Statistic includes total responses of "Filipino" and "Southeast Asian" under visible minority section on census.)	15,205	10.45%	14,815	10.28%	13,905	9.74%	11,825	8.31%	9,670	6.49%	7,895	5.42%
Latin American	11,035	7.58%	10,060	6.98%	11,055	7.74%	10,045	7.06%	8,640	5.8%	6,480	4.44%
South Asian	5,965	4.1%	5,500	3.81%	6,115	4.28%	5,915	4.16%	6,940	4.66%	7,110	4.88%
East Asian (Note: Statistic includes total responses of "Chinese", "Korean", and "Japanese" under visible minority section on census.)	4,880	3.35%	4,920	3.41%	4,985	3.49%	4,605	3.24%	6,345	4.26%	5,710	3.92%
Middle Eastern (Note: Statistic includes total responses of "West Asian" and "Arab" under visible minority section on census.)	1,675	1.15%	1,490	1.03%	845	0.59%	1,545	1.09%	1,445	0.97%	1,550	1.06%
Indigenous	1,375	0.94%	1,620	1.12%	1,170	0.82%	1,205	0.85%	1,030	0.69%	860	0.59%
Other/multiracial (Note: Statistic includes total responses of "Visible minority, n.i.e." and "Multiple visible minorities" under visible minority section on census.)	5,215	3.58%	4,250	2.95%	4,030	2.82%	3,385	2.38%	3,555	2.39%	3,195	2.19%
Total responses	145,520	99.11%	144,170	98.98%	142,810	99.12%	142,255	99.3%	148,935	99.12%	145,785	99.49%
Total population	146,828	100%	145,662	100%	144,082	100%	143,255	100%	150,255	100%	146,534	100%
Note: Totals greater than 100% due to multiple origin responses.

== Education ==
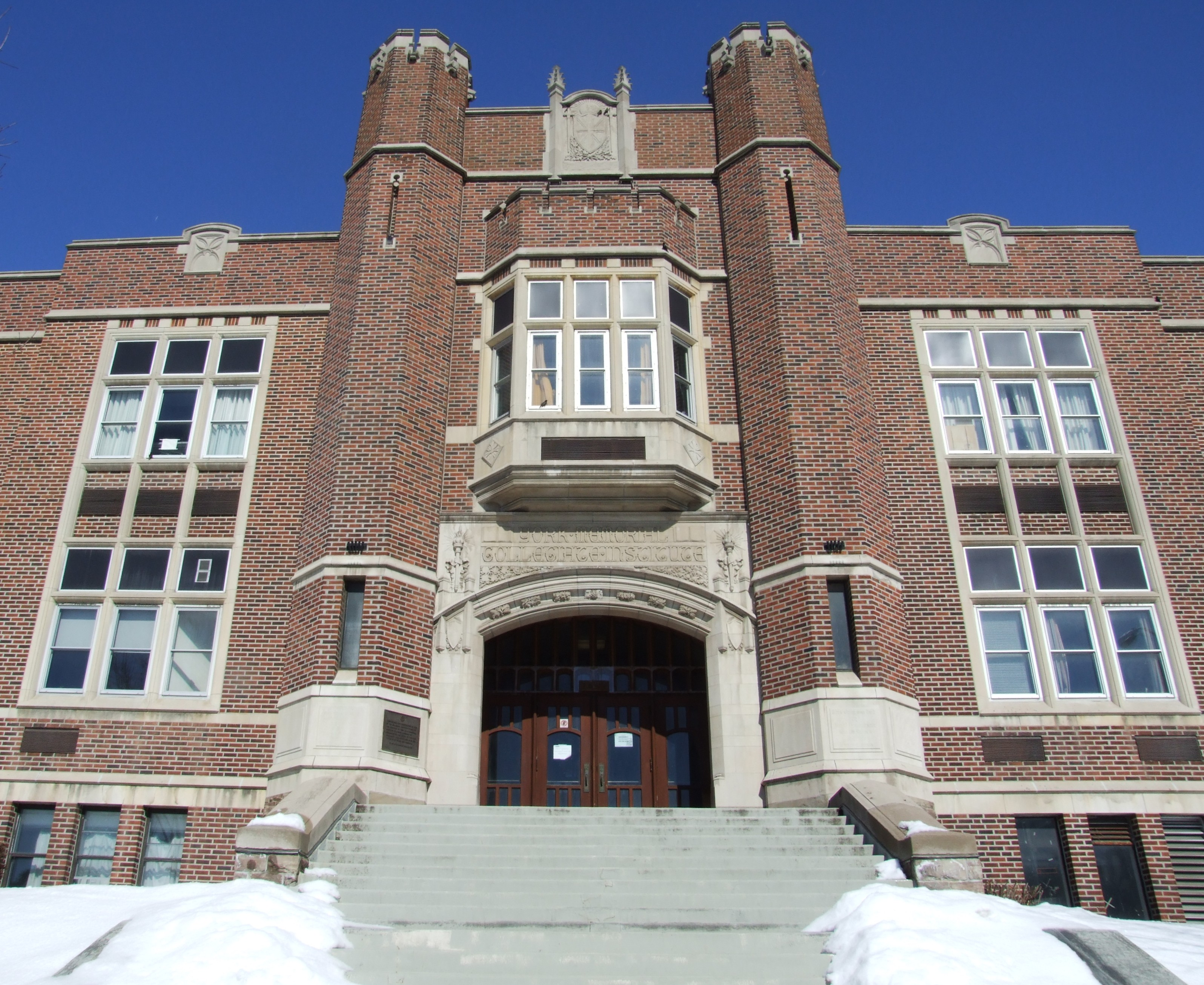
York Memorial Collegiate Institute is one of several public secondary schools located in York. This school had a major fire in 2019 that required major repairs. Students were relocated first to George Harvey Collegiate Institute then to the former Scarlett Heights Entrepreneurial Academy then merged with George Harvey Collegiate Institute under the York Memorial name.

Before York was dissolved, the York Board of Education (YBE) oversaw public English-language secular schools in the former city. Since 1998, the district has been administered by the four Toronto boards:

- Conseil scolaire catholique MonAvenir (CSCM)
- Conseil scolaire Viamonde (CSV)
- Toronto Catholic District School Board (TCDSB)
- Toronto District School Board (TDSB)

CSV and TDSB operate as secular public school boards, the former operating French first-language institution, whereas the latter operates English first-language institutions (although it does offer French immersion). The other two school boards, CSCM and TCDSB, operate as public Roman Catholic separate school boards, the former operating French first-language separate schools, the latter operating English first-language separate schools.

TDSB operates several institutions that offer primary and secondary education. Secondary schools in York that are operated by TDSB include:

- Forest Hill Collegiate Institute (Note: This school is located within Old Toronto proper, but its catchment area includes much of the eastern half of York since the closure of Vaughan Road Academy in 2017.)
- Frank Oke Secondary School
- George Harvey Collegiate Institute (merged with York Memorial Collegiate Institute)
- Oakwood Collegiate Institute
- Runnymede Collegiate Institute
- Weston Collegiate Institute
- York Memorial Collegiate Institute

TDSB formerly operated another secondary school in York, Vaughan Road Academy. Opened in 1927, the secondary school was York's first but was permanently closed on its 90th anniversary in 2017 due to its lack of student population resulting from students in the local catchment area attending other nearby secondary schools. Vaughan Road Academy is repurposed as a temporary elementary school for students in the Yonge and Davisville area in Midtown Toronto since the 2018–19 school year to accommodate the construction of a new school building.

TCDSB operates one secondary school in York, St. Oscar Romero Catholic Secondary School. Neither CSCM nor CSV operate a secondary school in York.

St. Michael's College School, an independent young men's Roman Catholic school, is located in the Tichester neighbourhood with its sports field being directly over St. Clair West station.

== Infrastructure ==
=== Public library system ===
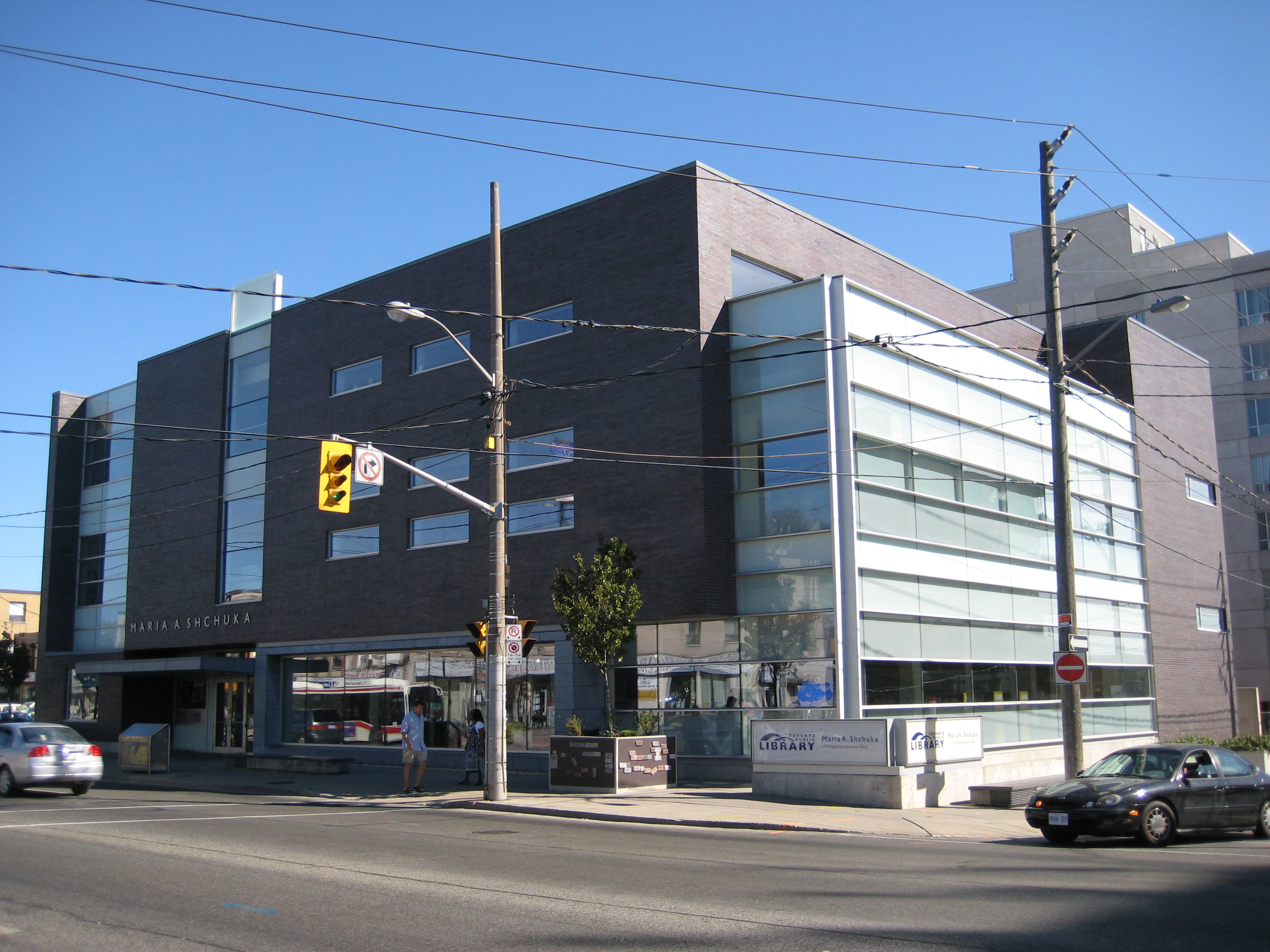
The Maria Shchuka branch of the Toronto Public Library was fully rebuilt in 2003 as seen in 2009.

Before 1998, the city operated its own library system, the York Public Library. York Public Library was merged with the other library systems of Metro Toronto to form the new Toronto Public Library (TPL). TPL operates several branches within the district.

York's first public library was the Mount Dennis branch, which operated out of rented premises from 1923. In 1945, the Township of York Public Library Board was established, and proceeded to build three new library buildings that opened in 1951, including the Jane/Dundas library, Main Library (Eglinton Avenue one block east of Dufferin Street), and the Mount Dennis Library. The Main Library was later renamed after York Public Library head librarian Maria Shchuka upon amalgamation and was later fully rebuilt in 2003. The Oakwood Village branch was York's newest library, which opened in 1996, two years before York Public Library was officially dissolved.

== Public transit ==
York operated its own bus and streetcar service, until it was absorbed by the Toronto Transit Commission. Today, the area is served by the Toronto Transit Commission's buses, streetcar, and subway system. Of the Toronto subway system before the opening of Line 5 Eglinton in 2026, only the Heath Street exit of St. Clair West station on Line 1 Yonge–University is in the former city of York, as Cedarvale station (formerly Eglinton West) is completely within Old Toronto. The Rogers Road streetcar line served the namesake street as well.

=== Line 5 Eglinton ===
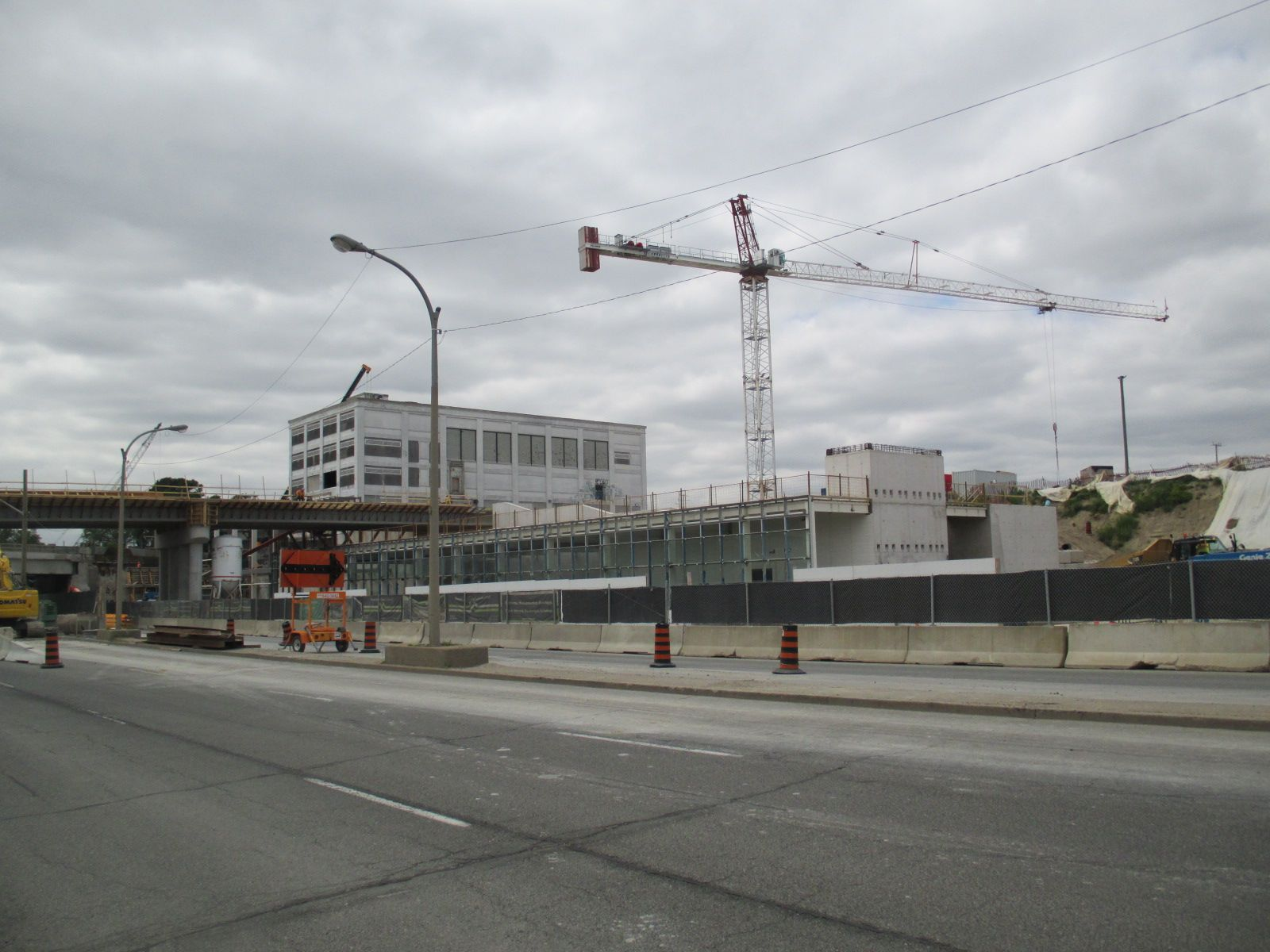
Mount Dennis station under construction in 2018

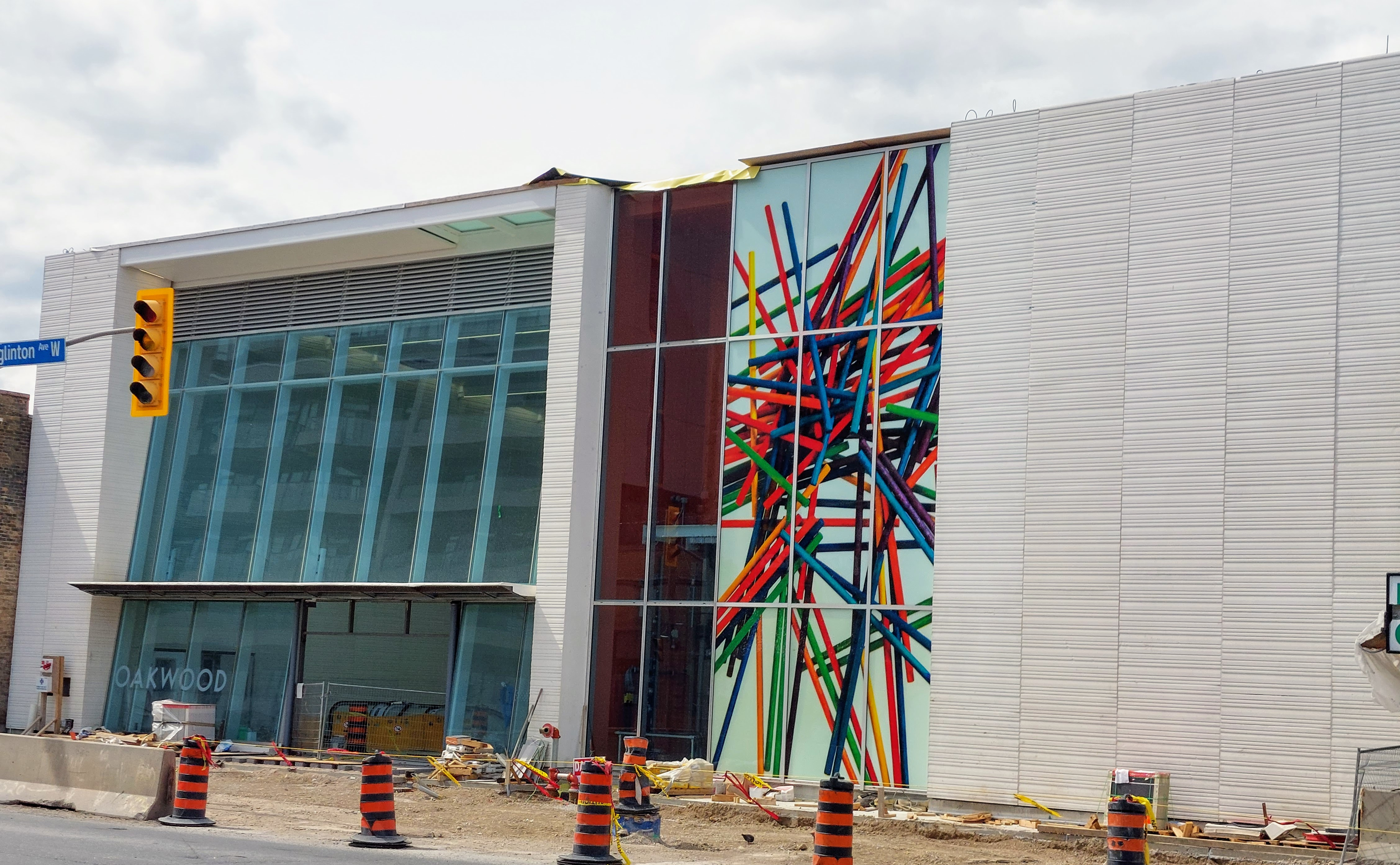
Oakwood station under construction in 2022

The TTC once had plans to construct the Eglinton West subway line along Eglinton Avenue. It began construction in 1994. However, it was cancelled in 1995 under Ontario premier Mike Harris and there had been no serious discussion about reviving the line until 2007, when Line 5 Eglinton (then known as the Eglinton Crosstown LRT) was proposed as part of David Miller's Transit City.

When Rob Ford became mayor in 2010, he immediately announced the cancellation of Transit City. However, city council spared a few lines, including the Eglinton Crosstown LRT, from cancellation, despite Ford's objections.

The LRT, which began construction in 2011, opened on February 8, 2026. From west to east, the following stations are in York district, giving the former city its first rapid transit stops: Mount Dennis, Keelesdale, Caledonia, Fairbank and Oakwood.

=== GO Transit ===
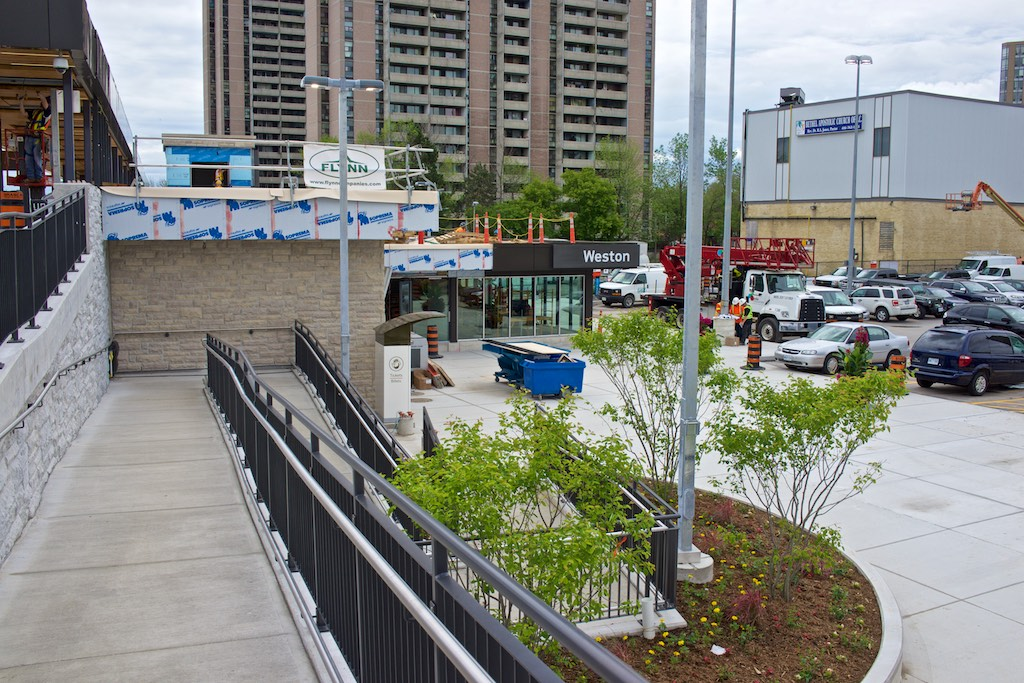
Weston GO Station is a regional commuter station that provides access to GO Transit and Union Pearson Express services.

The Weston GO Station and the Mount Dennis GO Station, both along the Kitchener line, are the two GO Transit train stations and Union Pearson Express (UP Express) train stations in the district. Mount Dennis GO Station, connecting with Line 5's Mount Dennis station, opened in November 2025. The Caledonia GO Station along the Barrie line, which would connect with Line 5's Caledonia station and the western end of the York Beltline Trail, is under construction.

== Municipal government ==
The community was first organized as a township in 1793, but not incorporated until 1850. The township was initially a township under the County of York until 1954. In 1954, York was formally severed from the county, along with other municipalities situated south of Steeles Avenue to form the upper-tier government of Metropolitan Toronto. In 1967, the township was formally made into a borough of Metropolitan Toronto, and later a city in 1983. In 1997, York, along with the remaining municipalities of Metropolitan Toronto, were formally amalgamated to form the new City of Toronto. Since then, residents now vote for the Mayor of Toronto, as well as councillors of Toronto City Council and school trustees, either TDSB or TCDSB. Federally and provincially, eligible residents of York are also able to vote for members of the Parliament of Canada and the Legislative Assembly of Ontario, respectively.

=== Reeves ===
Prior to York's amalgamation with Toronto in 1998, York operated its own municipal council, with a mayor heading York's council. Prior to the municipality's incorporation as a borough, the chief magistrate of the council was referred to as a reeve. The following individuals served as the reeves of the Township of York:

- Franklin Jackes (1850–1851) – first reeve
- William James (1852–1860)
- William Tyrrell (1860–1864) – architect, later first reeve of Weston
- Bartholomew Bull, Jr. (1865–1872)
- William Tyrell (1873–1878) – second tenure
- Henry Duncan (1879–1886)
- Henry Frankland (1887)
- A.L. Wilson (1888–1889)
- Simon Thomas Humberstone (1890–1894)
- William James Hill (1894–1897) – later MPP for York West
- Henry Duncan (1898–1902) – second tenure
- William Sylvester (1903–1904)
- George Syme (1905)
- George Stewart Henry (1906–1910) – later MPP for York East and Premier of Ontario
- John T. Watson (1911–1912)
- George Syme (1913–1914) – second tenure
- Thomas Griffiths (1915–1918)
- Frederick H. Miller (1919–1922)
- W.S. Jury (1923)
- William M. Graham (1924–1927)
- Ernest C. Westbury (1928–1929)
- W.J. Gilbert Dean (1930–1931)
- A.J.B. Gray (1932–1933)
- R.J. Stuart (1934–1935)
- Wesley Marsh Magwood (1936–1937) – Magwood Park is named after him.
- F.J. MacRae (1938–1946)
- Charles J. McMaster (1947–1948)
- William George Beech (1949–1951) – later MPP for York South
- Frederick W. Hall (1952–1956) – was reeve when Metropolitan Toronto was created, with York as a member municipality. Subsequently, became chairman of the Metro Licensing Committee. Hall was later tried on charges of municipal corruption for allegedly accepting bribes for building permits during his tenure as reeve.
- Christopher Alexander Tonks (1957–1960) – focus of a scandal after he was accused of conflict of interest for voting for a by-law that allowed him to purchase property from the township. Unseated by a court order after a judicial probe but then reinstated on appeal.
- Frederick Charles Taylor (1961) – Owner of a construction firm, he was elected on a reform agenda after allegations of corruption against York Township council, having first demanded a judicial probe of the township in 1956. Died in office.
- Walter Saunders (1962) – Previously Councillor for Ward 2, council voted Saunders in as reeve in January 1962, following the death of Reeve Taylor. A travel agent by profession, Saunders had run for reeve in previous general elections but had not been successful. Walter Saunders Memorial Park along the York Beltline Trail between Dufferin Street and Times Road is named after him.
- John Lister (Jack) Mould (1963–1966) – ran against former reeve Chris Tonks and was elected by 44 votes, after a recount. Mould was York's last reeve and would be its first mayor. Ran for the position of Metropolitan Toronto Chairman in July 1969 but was forced to withdraw from the contest after Member of Parliament Ralph Cowan accused him of tax evasion.

=== Mayors ===
The following individuals served as York's mayor:

- John Lister (Jack) Mould (1966–1969)
- Philip White (1970–1978)
- Gayle Christie (1978–1982)
- Alan Tonks (1982–1988) – resigned to become Metro Chairman, later MP for York South
- Fergus Brown (1988–1994)
- Frances Nunziata (1994–1997)

The following individual served as the Deputy Mayor of York:

- Joe Mihevc (1991–1997)

=== Board of Control ===
The Board of Control was created in 1966 and abolished in 1988. The following individuals served as on the Board of Control:

York's two Controllers also sat on Metro Council.

Names in boldface indicate Controllers that were or became Mayor of York in other years. Italics indicate those who only sat on the Board of Control as mayor.

X = elected as Controller
A = appointed Controller to fill a vacancy
M = sitting as Reeve or Mayor

Elections to the Board of Control for York (1966-1985)
Controller	1966	1969	1972	1974	1976	1978	1980	1982	1985
C. Wesley Boddington	X								
**Fergy Brown***						X	X	X	X
**Gayle Christie**						M	M		
**John Lister Mould**	M								
Doug Saunders		X	X	X	X				
**Alan Tonks**					X	X		M	M
James Trimbee		X	X	X					
**Philip White**	X	M	M	M	M		X	X	X

*Brown served as mayor from 1988 to 1994

== See also ==
- List of neighbourhoods in York
- History of neighbourhoods in Toronto
