= List of Jewish architects =

This is a list of Jewish architects.

== A ==
- Max Abramovitz (23 May 1908, Chicago, IL–12 September 2004, Pound Ridge, NY), was an architect best known for his work with the New York City firm Harrison & Abramovitz. United States
- Dankmar Adler (3 July 1844, Stadtlengsfeld, Germany–16 April 1900, Chicago, IL), was an architect and civil engineer, best known for his partnership with Louis Sullivan. United States
- David Adler (3 January 1882, Milwaukee, WI–27 September 1949, Libertyville, IL), was an architect who designed more than 200 buildings in over 35 years. United States
- Walter W. Ahlschlager (19 July 1887, Chicago, IL–28 March 1965, Dallas, TX), was an American architect, one of whose designs is the Mercantile National Bank Building in Dallas. United States
- Bruno Ahrends (né Bruno Arons) (9 April 1878, Berlin, Germany–24 July 1948, Cape Town, South Africa), was an architect in Berlin, most of whose creations today are under cultural heritage management some of which are part of a World Heritage Site. Germany
- Gregory Ain (28 March 1908, Pittsburgh, PA–9 January 1988, Los Angeles, CA), was a protégé of Richard Neutra and active in the mid-20th century in California. United States
- Alfred-Philibert Aldrophe (7 February 1834, Paris, France–29 October 1895, Paris, France), was the architect of the Consistory of Paris and began construction of the Grand Synagogue of Paris in 1867, which opened in 1874. France
- Alfred S. Alschuler (2 November 1876, Chicago, IL–11 June 1940, Chicago, IL), was an American architect who designed warehouses, department stores, industrial buildings, synagogues, and offices in Chicago at the turn of the 20th century. United States
- Clara Ant (7 February 1948, La Paz, Bolivia–), is a Brazilian architect and served as the personal assistant to Brazilian president Luiz Inácio Lula da Silva. Brazil
- Michael Arad (1969, London, United Kingdom–), is an Israeli-American architect known for his winning design of the World Trade Center Memorial in New York City. United States
- Ron Arad (Hebrew: רון ארד) (24 April 1951, Tel Aviv, Israel–), is an industrial designer, artist, and architectural designer. Israel
- Shlomo Aronson (Hebrew: שלמה אהרונסון) (27 November 1936, Haifa, Mandatory Palestine–12 September 2018), was an Israeli landscape architect and winner of the Global Award for Sustainable Architecture in 2011. Israel
- David Azrieli, CM CQ (Hebrew: דוד עזריאלי) (10 May 1922, Maków Mazowiecki, Poland–9 July 2014, Ivry-sur-le-Lac, Canada), was a Canadian builder, designer, architect, developer, and philanthropist. Canada, Israel

== B ==
- Alexander Baerwald (3 March 1877, Berlin, Germany–27 October 1930, Haifa, Mandatory Palestine), was a German architect best known for his contribution to early Erez Israel architecture. Germany, Erez Israel
- Nahum Barnet (16 August 1855, Melbourne, Australia–1 September 1931, St Kilda, Australia), was a successful and prolific architect working in Melbourne during the Victorian and Edwardian eras. Australia
- Joseph Barsky (Hebrew: יוסף ברסקי) (?, Odessa, Russian Empire–1943, Haifa, Palestine), was one of Erez Israel's leading architects and designed the Herzliya Hebrew Gymnasium in Jerusalem. Erez Israel.
- Armand Phillip Bartos (1910, New York, NY–29 December 2005, New York, NY), was an architect and philanthropist, best known for the Shrine of the Book, co-designed with Frederick John Kiesler, housing the gift of the State of Israel of the Dead Sea Scrolls by his father-in-law Samuel Gottesman. United States
- Elias George Basevi (1 April 1794 – 16 October 1845, Ely, United Kingdom), was an English architect, protégé of architect John Soane, and the first surveyor of the Guardian Assurance Company. United Kingdom
- Lipót Baumhorn (Hungarian: Baumhorn Lipót) (German: Leopold Baumhorn) (28 December 1860, Kisbér, Hungary–8 July 1932, Kisbér, Hungary), was a Hungarian architect who designed around 20 synagogues in the Kingdom of Hungary. Austria-Hungary, Hungary
- Herbert Bayer (5 April 1900, Haag, Austria-Hungary–30 September 1985, Montecito, CA), was an Austrian and American graphic designer, painter, photographer, sculptor, art director, environmental and interior designer, and architect. Austria, United States
- Walter Curt Behrendt (16 December 1884, Metz, Germany–26 April 1945), was a German-American architect, an active advocate of German Modernism, and an expert on city planning and public housing. United States
- Artur Berger (Russian: Артур Семёнович Бергер) (27 May 1892, Vienna, Austria–11 January 1981, Moscow, USSR), was an Austrian-Soviet film architect, set designer and co-founder of the Lehrinstitut für Tonfilmkunst (Teaching Institute of Sound Film) in Vienna. Austria, USSR
- Gary Berkovich (Russian: Гари Беркович) (26 May 1935, Kharkiv, USSR–), is a Soviet-trained architect and writer; among the first former Soviet architect-émigrés of the 1970s to register and open a successful practice in the US. USSR, United States.
- Eliyahu Berlin (né Eliyahu Berligne) (Hebrew: אליהו ברלין) (1866, Russian Empire–25 February 1959), was a founder of Tel Aviv, an important member of the Yishuv in Mandatory Palestine, and a signatory of the Israeli Declaration of Independence. Erez Israel
- Edward Blum (c. 1867, Paris, France–26 March 1944, New York, NY) and George Blum (1870, France–1928), were École des Beaux-Arts-trained brothers, known for their terra cotta-clad Art Nouveau Manhattan apartment buildings. United States
- Moti Bodek (1961, Haifa, Israel–), is an Israeli architect and a lecturer at Bezalel Academy of Arts and Design in Jerusalem. Israel
- Ricardo Bofill (né Ricard Bofill Leví) (5 December 1939, Barcelona, Spain–), is the founder of Ricardo Bofill Taller de Arquitectura in 1963 and developed it into a leading international architectural and urban design practice. Spain
- Marcel Breuer (21 May 1902 Pécs, Hungary–1 July 1981, New York, NY), was a Modernist architect and furniture designer whose work includes art museums, libraries, college buildings, office buildings, and residences. United States
- Ella Briggs (née Baumfeld) (5 March 1880, Vienna, Austria-Hungary–20 June 1977, London, United Kingdom), was an Austrian and English architect who became the first female member of the Österreichischer Ingenieur- und Architekten-Verein (Austrian Engineers and Architects Association). United States, Austria, Germany
- Arnold Brunner (25 September 1857, New York, NY–14 February 1925, New York, NY), is considered the first successful US-born Jewish architect and city planner. United States
- Gordon Bunshaft (9 May 1909, Buffalo, NY–6 August 1990, New York, NY), was a 20th-century Pritzker Prize-winning Modernist architect and a partner in the firm of Skidmore, Owings and Merrill. United States
- Roberto Burle Marx (4 August 1909, São Paulo, Brazil–4 June 1994, Rio de Janeiro, Brazil), was a Brazilian landscape architect, painter, printmaker, ecologist, naturalist, artist, and musician. Brazil
- David Busch was an architect, the chief engineer of Oradea, Romania, and planner of the Neologist Synagogue built 1877–8. Romania

== C ==
- Giorgio Cavaglieri (11 August 1911, Venice, Italy–15 May 2007, New York, NY), was an architectural preservationist and painter of gouaches, best known for his 1960s restoration of the Jefferson Market Library in Manhattan's Greenwich Village. United States
- Ivan Ceresnjes (né Ivica Ceresnjes), (1945, Sarajevo, Bosnia, and Herzegovina–), is a Bosnian architect-researcher at the Hebrew University of Jerusalem. Israel
- Irwin Chanin (29 October 1891, New York, NY–24 February 1988, New York, NY), was a designer of Art Deco office towers and Broadway theaters, a real estate developer, and benefactor to his alma mater, The Cooper Union, which named its school of architecture in his honor. United States
- Pierre Chareau (4 August 1883, Bordeaux, France–24 August 1950, New York, NY), was a French architect and designer, credited for building the first house in France made of steel and glass, the Maison de Verre.
- Serge Chermayeff (8 October 1900, Grozny, Russian Empire–8 May 1996, Wellfleet, MA), was an architect whose interwar partnership with Erich Mendelsohn was noted for bringing Modernism to Great Britain; writer, professor and co-founder of professional societies in the US. United States
- Yakov Chernikhov (Russian: Яков Георгиевич Чернихов), (17 December 1889, Pavlograd, Russian Empire–9 May 1951, Moscow, USSR), was a Constructivist architect and graphic designer whose books on architectural design between 1927 and 1933 are among the most innovative texts and illustrations of their time. USSR
- Elizabeth Close (née Elizabeth Scheu) (4 June 1912, Vienna, Austria–29 November 2011, Minneapolis, MN), became the first female architect in Minneapolis and received a lifetime achievement award by the American Institute of Architects (AIA). United States
- Jean-Louis Cohen (20 July 1949, Paris, France–), is a French architect and architectural historian specializing in modern architecture and city planning; professor at New York University Institute of Fine Arts. France
- Preston Scott Cohen is a Boston-based designer and the Gerald M. McCue Professor in Architecture at Harvard Graduate School of Design (GSD). United States

== D ==
- Michel de Klerk (24 November 1884, Amsterdam, Netherlands–24 November 1923, Amsterdam, Netherlands), was a Dutch architect and one of the founders of the Amsterdam School movement. Netherlands
- Joseph de Lange (nl) (18 April 1883, Amsterdam, Nethlerlands–28 January 1948, Antwerp, Belgium), was the designer of the Eisenmann Synagogue in Antwerp. Netherlands, Belgium
- Julio Deutsch (Croatian: Julije Dajč) (29 September 1859, Geppersdorf, Austria-Hungary–9 June 1922, Zagreb, Kingdom of Serbs, Croats, and Slovenes), was a Croatian architect known for his Art Nouveau architectural style and the designer of the Hotel Palace in Zagreb, originally called Schlesinger Palace (1891). Austria-Hungary
- Angelo Di Castro (it) (25 January 1901, Rome, Italy–28 November 1989, Rome, Italy), was an Italian architect known for his design for the Synagogue of Livorno. Italy
- Elizabeth Diller (1954, Lodz, Poland–), is a partner with her husband, Ricardo Scofidio, and Charles Renfro at Diller Scofidio + Renfro, the first architectural firm to win the so-called "genius award," a MacArthur Prize. United States
- Todd A. Drucker (24 April 1994, New York, NY–), is an American architect that works for GKV Architects in New York City. He focuses on renewable building materials, such as high rise structures predominantly made from timber. He goes by the affectionate nickname "Timber Todd". United States
- Dan Dworsky (4 October 1927, Minneapolis, MN–), has been a leading Southern California architect since the early 1950s. United States

== E ==
- Drew Eberson (1904, Hamilton, OH–July 1989, Stamford, CT), was an architect who designed and renovated many movie theaters in the US and abroad. United States
- John Eberson (2 January 1875, Czernowitz, Austria-Hungary–5 March 1954, Stamford, CT), was an architect best known for his atmospheric movie theaters. United States
- John H. Edelmann (1852–July 1900), was a socialist-anarchist architect who worked in the office of Alfred Zucker and designed the Decker Building in New York City. United States
- Semyon Eibushits (ru) (Russian: Семён Семёнович Эйбушиц) (24 June 1851, Austria–4 July 1898, Moscow, Russian Empire), was a Russian architect. Russian Empire
- Cyrus L. W. Eidlitz (27 July 1853, New York, NY–5 October 1921, New York, NY), was best known for designing One Times Square, the former New York Times Building, on Times Square. United States
- Leopold Eidlitz (10 March 1823, Prague, Bohemia—22 March 1908, New York, NY), was an architect best known for his work on the New York State Capitol in Albany, NY. United States
- Aleksandr Eingorn (ru) (Russian: Александр Львович Эйнгорн) (12 December 1888, Russian Empire–December 1939, USSR), was a Russian and Soviet architect and an honorary member of the Royal Institute of British Architects. Russian Empire, USSR
- Peter Eisenman (11 August 1932, Newark, NJ–), is an American architect of global renown noted for his Memorial to the Murdered Jews of Europe in Berlin (2005). United States
- Sidney Eisenshtat (6 June 1914, New Haven, CT–1 March 2005, Los Angeles, CA), was an architect best known for Modernist synagogues. United States
- Mikhail Eisenstein (Russian: Михаил Осипович Эйзенштейн) (5 September 1867, St. Petersburg, Russian Empire–2 July 1921, Berlin, Germany), was a Russian architect and one of the leading proponents of the Russian version of Art Nouveau. Russian Empire
- Otto Eisler (1 June 1893, Bystřice nad Pernštejnem, Austria-Hungary–27 July 1968, Brno, Czechoslovakia), was a Czech architect noted for his contributions to the International style. Czechoslovakia
- Aryeh Elhanani (Arieh El-Hanani) (né Sapozhnikov) (1898, Poltava, Russian Empire–1985, Israel), was an Israeli architect noted for the reconstruction of The Great Synagogue in Tel Aviv. Israel.
- Erez Ella (Hebrew: ארז אלה) (1971–), is an Israeli architect based in New York City and heads the sustainable design unit at the Bezalel Academy of Art and Design in Jerusalem. Israel, United States
- Mark Elman (Russian: Марк Моисеевич Эльман) (1928, Odessa, USSR–), is a Soviet architect, known for his design of entertainment buildings. USSR
- Harry Elte (né Hartog Elte) (3 September 1880, Amsterdam, Netherlands–1 April 1944, Theresienstadt concentration camp [Terezín, Czechoslovakia]), was a Dutch architect of the Amsterdam School who was murdered by the Nazis. Netherlands
- Abraham Elzas (nl) (14 September 1907, Alkmaar, Netherlands–5 September 1995, Amsterdam, Netherlands), was a Dutch architect.
- Paul Engelmann (14 June 1891, Olmütz, Austria-Hungary−5 February 1965, Tel Aviv, Israel), was a Viennese architect who is now best known for his partnership with Ludwig Wittgenstein in the design and building of the Stonborough House in Vienna before he fled Nazis in 1934. Austria-Hungary, Erez Israel, Israel
- Viktor Estrovich (ru) (Russian: Виктор Абрамович Эстрович) (1881, Rossieny, Russian Empire–1941, Kharkiv, USSR), was a renowned Russian and Soviet architect murdered by Nazis. Russian Empire, USSR

== F ==
- Garry Faif (12 June 1942, Tbilisi, USSR–12 April 2002, Paris, France), was a Soviet and French architect, one of the few former Soviet architect-émigrés of the 1970s to practice in the West successfully. USSR, France
- Georg Falck (de) (10 August 1878, Landeck, Germany–22 May 1947, New York, NY), was a German architect before he fled the Nazis to the Netherlands. Germany
- Mark Felger (ru) (Russian: Марк Давидович Фельгер) (1881, Russian Empire–1962, USSR) was a distinguished Russian and Soviet architect. Russian Empire, USSR
- Bedřich Feuerstein (15 January 1892, Dobrovice, Austria-Hungary–10 May 1936, Prague, Czechoslovakia), was a Czech architect, painter, and essayist. Czechoslovakia
- Emanuele Fiano (13 March 1963, Milan, Italy–), is an Italian architect, urban planner and member of the Italian Chamber of Deputies. Italy
- Yuly Filler (ru) (Russian: Юлий Исаакович Филлер) (1932, Moscow, USSR–), is a well known Soviet and Russian architect. USSR, Russia
- Maurice Herman Finkel (1888, Bessarabia, Russian Empire–1949), was a Detroit architect who was also a performer in the Yiddish theater. United States
- Ignjat Fischer (18 June 1870, Zagreb, Croatia–19 January 1948, Zagreb, Yugoslavia), was a Croatian architect noted for his design of the City Savings Bank of Zagreb (1922–1925). Croatia
- Tovy Fishel (ru) (Russian: Товий Лазаревич Фишель) (8 June 1869, Odessa, Russian Empire–1913?), was a Russian architect in Siberia. Russian Empire
- Julien Flegenheimer (fr) (25 April 1880, Geneva, Switzerland–1 October 1938, Geneva, Switzerland), was a Swiss architect best known for his Palace of Nations building in Geneva. Switzerland
- Max Fleischer (1841, Prostějov, Austrian Empire–1905 Vienna, Austria-Hungary), was a Moravian Jewish architect working in Vienna who designed many synagogues throughout the Austrian monarchy. Austria-Hungary
- Fred Forbát (né Forbát Alfréd) (31 March 1897, Pécs, Austria-Hungary–22 May 1972, Vällingby, Sweden), was an architect with significant work in Germany and Sweden. Germany, Sweden
- Danny Forster (19 September 1977, New York, NY–), is an American architect, designer, television host, producer, director, professor, and speaker. United States
- Sheldon Fox (c. 1930–19 December 2006), was an architect and co-founder of Kohn Pedersen Fox, a firm with particular expertise in the area of office design, supertall structures, and large-scale, urban, mixed-use developments. United States
- Josef Frank (15 July 1885, Baden bei Wien, Austria-Hungary–8 January 1967, Stockholm, Sweden), was an Austrian architect, artist, and designer whom the Nazis forced to flee the country; created with Oskar Strnad the Vienna School of Architecture. Austria, Sweden
- Rudolf Fränkel (14 June 1901, Neisse, German Empire–23 April 1974, Oxford, OH), was a German architect who was among the leaders of the pre-war avant-garde movement in Berlin; emigrated to the US and later joined the American Institute of Planners. Germany, Romania, United Kingdom, United States.
- Isidor Frantsuz (ru) (Russian: Исидор Аронович Француз) (19 July 1896, Odessa, Russian Empire–1991, USSR), was a renowned Soviet architect. USSR
- Ulrich Franzen (15 January 1921, Düsseldorf, Germany–6 October 2012, Santa Fe, NM), was among the most creative American architects in the second half of the 20th century. United States
- James Ingo Freed (23 June 1930, Essen, Germany–15 December 2005, New York, NY), was an American architect among whose major works is the Jacob K. Javits Convention Center in New York City. United States
- Boris Freidenberg (de) (German: Bernhard Freudenberg) (Russian: Борис Викторович Фрейденберг) (7 August 1850, Frankfurt am Main, Germany–29 December 1925, Graz, Austria), was a Russian architect. Russian Empire
- Konstantin Frenkel (ru) (Russian: Константин Давидович Френкель) (17 July 1912, St. Petersburg, Russian Empire—28 May 1980, Moscow, USSR), was a renowned Soviet architect. USSR
- Ernst L. Freud (6 April 1892, Vienna, Austria-Hungary–7 April 1970, London, United Kingdom), was a German-Austrian architect and later practiced in Britain, securing a number of commissions for private houses and blocks of flats around Hampstead, including the notable Frognal Close in 1938, Belvedere Court, and Lyttelton Road. Austria-Hungary, Germany, United Kingdom
- Dezső Freund (hu) (10 May 1884, Budapest, Austria-Hungary–18 February 1960, Budapest, Hungary), was a Hungarian architect.
- Isaak Fridenthal (Russian: Исаак Фриденталь) (1928, Kharkiv, USSR–), is a Soviet architect and Israeli artist. USSR, Israel
- Semyon Fridlin (Russian: Семён Давидович Фридлин) (28 December 1909, Kremenchug, Russian Empire–12 December 1992), was a Soviet architect among whose notable works in Ukraine were the music and drama theaters in Zaporozhye (1947–1953) and Chernihiv (1958). USSR
- Anatoly Fridman (ru) (Russian: Анатолий Иосифович Фридман) (17 May 1945, Minsk, USSR–), is a Soviet and Belarusian architect. USSR, Belarus
- Daniil Fridman (ru) (Russian: Даниил Фёдорович Фридман) (27 July 1887, Odessa, Russian Empire–31 August 1950, Moscow, USSR), was a renowned Soviet architect. USSR
- M. Paul Friedberg (11 October 1931, Brooklyn, NY–15 February 2025, New York, NY), is an American landscape architect, one of whose most notable projects was the Jacob Riis Plaza on the Lower East Side of Manhattan, undertaken in the mid-1960s. United States
- Yona Friedman (5 June 1923, Budapest, Hungary–20 February 2020, Los Angeles, CA), was an architect, urban planner, and designer best known for his theory of mobile architecture. France
- Robert Friedmann (de) (15 February 1888, Hamburg, Germany–10 September 1940, Jerusalem, Erez Israel), was a German architect, active in Hamburg. Germany
- Marie Frommer (17 March 1890, Warsaw, Poland–16 November 1976, New York, NY), was a well-known architect in Berlin before the Nazis forced her to flee the country, and whose work reflected the principles of Expressionism and the Neue Sachlichkeit (The New Objectivity). Germany, United Kingdom, United States
- Richard Fuchs (26 April 1887, Karlsruhe, Germany–22 September 1947, Wellington, New Zealand), was an architect and composer, and while in Wellington, worked as an architect with Natusch and Sons and the Housing Department. Germany, New Zealand

== G ==
- Vladimir Galperin (ru) (Russian: Владимир Михайлович Гальперин) (1898, Sevastopol, Russian Empire–1971, Leningrad, USSR), was a Soviet architect. USSR
- Robert Geddes (7 December 1923, Philadelphia, PA–13 February 2023, near Princeton, NJ), was an American architect, planner, writer, educator, former principal of the firm Geddes Brecher Qualls Cunningham (GBQC), and dean emeritus of the Princeton University School of Architecture (1965–1982). United States
- Jakob Gartner (6 October 1861 – 15 April 1921) was an Austrian architect
- Frank Gehry CC (né Frank Owen Goldberg) (28 February 1929, Toronto, Canada–), is a Canadian-American Pritzker Prize-winning architect based in Los Angeles, widely acclaimed for the Guggenheim Museum Bilbao in Spain. United States
- Mikhail Gelfer (ru) (Russian: Михаил Ефимович Гельфер) (1934, Moscow, USSR–), is a Soviet and Russian Federation architect. USSR, Russia
- Solomeya Gelfer (ru) (Russian: Саломея Максимовна Гельфер) (27 December 1916, Bialystok, Russian Empire–31 January 2011, Moscow, Russia), was a leading Soviet architect and expert in the design of entertainment buildings. USSR
- Alfred Gellhorn (de) (26 May 1885, Ohlau, German Empire–7 May 1972, London, United Kingdom), was a German architect. Germany.
- Ofra Gelman is an American architect specializing in hospitality design in Las Vegas, Nevada. United States
- Yakov Gevirts (ru) (Russian: Яков Германович Гевирц) (27 January 1879, Odessa, Russian Empire–1942, Leningrad, USSR), was a Russian and Soviet architect. Russian Empire, USSR
- Elsa Mandelstamm Gidoni (12 March 1901, Riga, Russian Empire–19 April 1978, Washington, DC), was a German-American architect and interior designer who became a member of the American Institute of Architects (AIA) in 1943. Erez Israel, United States.
- Herman Gincler (1899–?), was a Hungarian architect. Hungary
- Aleksandr Ginzburg (ru) (Russian: Александр Маркович Гинзбург) (4 July 1876, Slavyansk, Russian Empire–1949, Kharkiv, USSR), was a renowned Russian and Soviet architect, active in Kharkiv Jewish community affairs. Russian Empire, USSR
- Moisei Ginzburg (Russian: Моисей Яковлевич Гинзбург) (4 June 1892, Minsk, Russian Empire–7 January 1946, Moscow, USSR), was a Soviet architect, best known for his leading role in the Constructivist movement. USSR
- Boris I. Girshovich (ru) (Russian: Борис Ионович Гиршович) (23 August 1858, Korelichi, Russian Empire–6 July 1911, Pavlovsk, Russian Empire), was a renowned Russian architect. Russian Empire
- Boris O. Girshovich (Russian: Борис Осипович Гиршович) (1905, Kiev, Russian Empire–), is a Soviet architect and city planner. USSR
- Isidor Gitler (Russian: Исидор Альбертович Гитлер) (1902, Moscow, Russian Empire–1973, Kiev, USSR), was a Soviet architect. USSR
- Bertrand Goldberg (17 July 1913, Chicago, IL–8 October 1997, Chicago, IL), was an American architect best known for the Marina City complex in Chicago, the tallest residential concrete building in the world at the time of completion. United States
- Ernő Goldfinger (11 September 1902, Budapest, Hungary–15 November 1987, London, United Kingdom), was an architect and designer of furniture, and a vital member of the architectural Modern Movement after he had moved from Hungary to the United Kingdom. United Kingdom
- David S. Goldgor (ru) (Russian: Давид Семёнович Гольдгор) (25 October 1912, St. Petersburg, Russian Empire–12 July 1982, Leningrad, USSR), was a distinguished Soviet architect and graphic artist. USSR
- Helmut Goldschmidt (de) (16 October 1918, Magdeburg, Germany–6 August 2005, Cologne, Germany), was a German architect.
- Myron Goldsmith (15 September 1918, New York, NY–15 July 1996, Wilmette, IL), was an American architect, designer and educator; a student of Mies van der Rohe and Pier Luigi Nervi before designing 40 projects at Skidmore, Owings & Merrill from 1955 to 1983. United States
- Percival Goodman (13 January 1904, New York, NY–11 October 1989, New York, NY), was an urban theorist and architect who designed over 50 synagogues. United States
- Ezra Gordon (ru) (Russian: Эзра Гордон) (c. 1921, Detroit, MI–28 June 2009, Chicago, IL), was an architect and educator. United States
- J. M. Gerald Gordon (14 December 1933, Vryheid, South Africa−11 September 2016, Johannesburg, South Africa), was an architect, designer, and professor at the University of the Witwatersrand, best known for inventing the thin-skin building method for sustainable, low-cost construction. South Africa
- Aaron Green (1917, Corinth, MS−15 June 2001, San Francisco, CA), was an American architect; a protégé of Frank Lloyd Wright, he participated in 40 of Wright's projects. United States
- Aleksandr Grinberg (ru) (Russian: Александр Зиновьевич Гринберг) (1 August 1881, Odessa, Russian Empire–1938, Moscow, USSR), was a Soviet architect. Russian Empire, USSR
- Leonid Grinshpun (Russian: Леонид Осипович Гриншпун) (1906, Moscow, Russian Empire–1981, Moscow, USSR), was a Soviet architect. USSR
- Arthur Gross (1877–1950) was a partner of Schwartz and Gross, designer of pre-WWII Manhattan apartment buildings. United States
- Alfred Grotte (1872–1944, Theresienstadt concentration camp [Terezín, Czechoslovakia]), was a professor, historian, conservator, and architect; reconstructed the Maisel Synagogue in Prague in the Neo-Gothic style.
- Victor Gruen (18 July 1903, Vienna, Austria–14 February 1980, Vienna Austria), was a pioneer in the design of shopping malls in the United States.
- Hector Guimard (10 March 1867, Lyon, France–20 May 1942, New York, NY), was a non-Jewish architect, who is now the best-known representative of the French Art Nouveau style of the late nineteenth and early twentieth centuries. France
- Mikhail Gurevich (ru) (Russian: Михаил Борисович Гуревич) (1925, Orel, USSR–), is a Soviet architect. USSR
- Natan Gurevich (ru) (Russian: Натан Львович Гуревич) (1896, Kakhovka, Russian Empire–1958, Moscow, USSR), was a Soviet architect involved in designing bridges and riverbanks. Russian Empire, USSR
- Viktor Gurevich (Russian: Виктор НатановичГуревич) (1925, Volkhov, USSR–), is a Soviet architect. USSR
- Abram Gurkov (ru) (Russian: Абрам Бенционович Гурков) (24 January 1919, Lubny, USSR–27 March 1998), was a renowned Soviet architect. USSR
- Erwin Anton Gutkind (20 May 1886, Berlin, Germany–7 August 1968, Philadelphia, PA), was an architect, city planner and educator; primary architect for the Berlin building firm, Gruppe Nord. Germany, United Kingdom, United States
- Aleksey Gutnov (de) (ru) (Russian: Алексей Эльбрусович Гутнов) (26 June 1937, Moscow, USSR–14 July 1986, Moscow, USSR), was a Soviet architectural theoretician and urban planner. USSR
- Yakov Guzman (ru) (Russian: Яков Наумович Гузман) (1925, Odessa, USSR–1990, Moscow, USSR), was a Soviet architect. USSR

== H ==
- Moritz Hadda (de) (16 January 1887, Cosel, Upper Silesia–1942, Riga, Kaiserwald concentration camp, USSR), was a German architect murdered by the Nazis. Germany
- Alfréd Hajós (1 February 1878, Budapest, Austria-Hungary–12 November 1955, Budapest, Hungary), was an architect specializing in sports facilities and an Olympic champion swimmer. Hungary
- Wilhelm Ze’ev Haller (de) (11 June 1884, Gleiwitz, Upper Silesia–10 May 1956, Tel Aviv, Israel), was a German and Israeli architect. Germany, Erez Israel, Israel
- Lawrence Halprin (1 July 1916 – 25 October 2009), was a landscape architect and educator, one of whose notable projects was the master landscaping plan for the 1962 Seattle World's Fair. United States
- Moshe Harel (13 October 1920, Sittard, Netherlands–15 August 2001, Herzlia, Israel), was an Israeli architect. Netherlands, Israel
- Ricardo Havilah Ben-Yehudah (1991, Tampico, Mexico–), is a Mexican-Israeli architect known for his emphasis on parametric geometry, computational sciences, and digital fabrication. Mexico, Erez Israel, Israel
- David A. Haymes is a renowned Chicago architect and a founder of Pappageorge Haymes Partners. United States
- Zvi Hecker (Hebrew: צבי הקר) (31 May 1931, Cracow, Poland–), is an Israeli architect known for his emphasis on geometry and asymmetry. Israel
- Ármin Hegedűs (hu) (5 October 1869, Szecseny, Austria-Hungary–29 June 1945, Budapest, Hungary), was a Hungarian architect. Austria-Hungary, Hungary
- Gregory Henriquez (1963, Winnipeg, Canada–), is a Canadian architect, best known for the design of complex mixed-use, institutional, retail, and office, with both market and social housing projects in Canada. Canada
- Hermann Henselmann (3 February 1905, Roßla, Germany–19 January 1995, Berlin, Germany), was a German architect most well-known for his buildings constructed in East Germany during the 1950s and 60s. Germany
- Manfred Hermer (ru) (Russian: Манфред Хермер) (1915, Volksrust, South Africa–), is a leading South African architect. South Africa
- Henry Beaumont Herts (23 January 1871, New York, NY–27 March 1933, New York, NY), was an American architect among whose works is the Brooklyn Academy of Music. United States
- Manuel Herz (1969–) is an architect with his own practice in Basel, Switzerland, and Cologne, Germany, and teaches at Harvard University’s Graduate School of Design. Germany, Switzerland
- Ludwig Karl Hilbersheimer (14 September 1885, Karlsruhe, Germany–6 May 1967, Chicago, IL), was an American architect, taught at the Bauhaus, and was involved with Arbeitsrat für Kunst and other avant-garde groups, including the Expressionist Der Sturm and Der Ring. United States, Germany
- Franz Hillinger (30 March 1895, Oradea, Romania–18 August 1973, New York, NY), was a German architect, forced by the Nazis to leave the country; supervised construction of the new Parliament building in Ankara, Turkey, in the 1950s. Germany, Turkey, United States
- Pinhas Hitt (ru) (Hebrew: פנחס היט) (Russian: Пинхас Хитт) (1888, Lvov, Austria-Hungary–1949, Israel). Austria-Hungary, Poland, Mandatory Palestine, Israel
- Friedrich Hitzig (né Georg Friedrich Heinrich Hitzig) (8 November 1811, Berlin, Germany–11 October 1881, Berlin, Germany), was a German architect and became a member of the Prussian Academy of Arts in 1855. Germany
- Leo Hönigsberg (Croatian: Lavoslav Hoenigsberg) (1861, Zagreb, Austria-Hungary–2 May 1911, Zagreb, Austria-Hungary), was a famous Croatian architect and co-founder with Julio Deutsch of Hönigsberg & Deutsch. Austria-Hungary, Croatia
- Friedensreich Hundertwasser (né Friedrich Stowasser) (15 December 1928, Vienna, Austria–19 February 2000, aboard the Queen Elizabeth 2), was an Austrian painter and architect whose best-known work is the Hundertwasserhaus in Vienna. Austria

== I ==
- Marcel Iancu (24 May 1895, Bucharest, Romania–21 April 1984, El Hod, Israel), was an architect, plastic artist, and art theorist; co-inventor of Dadaism and a leading exponent of Constructivism in Eastern Europe. Romania
- Benjamin Idelson (de) (1 April 1911, St. Petersburg, Russian Empire–30 November 1972, Tel Aviv, Israel), was a successful Israeli architect. Erez Israel
- Boris Iofan (Russian: Борис Михайлович Иофан) (28 April 1891, Odessa, Russian Empire–11 March 1976, Moscow, USSR), was a Soviet architect known for his Stalinist architecture buildings, such as the House on the Embankment (1931). USSR
- Dmitry Iofan (Russian: Дмитрий Михайлович Иофан) (1885, Odessa, Russian Empire–1961, Moscow, USSR), was a Russian and Soviet architect. Russia, USSR
- Yevgeny Ioheles (ru) (Russian: Евгений Львович Иохелес) (12 May 1908, Moscow, Russian Empire–1989, Moscow, USSR), was a famous Soviet architect. USSR
- Garold Isakovich (ru) (Russian: Гарольд Григорьевич Исакович) (7 November 1931, Moscow, USSR–1992, Moscow, Russia), was a distinguished Soviet architect best known for the design of the Lenin Memorial. USSR
- Franklin D. Israel (c. 1945, New York City, NY–1995, Los Angeles, CA), was an architect whose designs for private houses and offices for film production companies epitomized the creative ferment of contemporary Hollywood. United States

== J ==
- Arne Jacobsen (11 February 1902, Copenhagen, Denmark–24 March 1971, Copenhagen, Denmark), was a Danish architect and furniture designer, known for his contribution to architectural functionalism. Denmark
- Ernst Jacobsson (sv) (16 August 1839, Stockholm, Sweden–6 December 1905, Stockholm, Sweden), was a Swedish architect. Sweden
- Johann Eduard Jacobsthal (de) (17 September 1839, Preußisch Stargard, Germany–1 January 1902, Berlin, Germany), was a German architect. Germany
- Alfred Jacoby (3 September 1950, Offenbach am Main, Germany–), is a German architect and architectural lecturer, principally known for his synagogues in post-war Germany. Germany
- Lajos Jámbor (architect) (hu) (31 October 1869, Pest, Hungary–6 November 1955, Budapest, Hungary), was a Hungarian architect. Hungary
- Hans Sigmund Jaretzki (de) (26 June 1890, Berlin, Germany–16 March 1956, London, United Kingdom), was a renowned German and British architect. Germany, United Kingdom
- Herman Jessor (15 June 1894, Russian Empire–8 April 1990, New York, NY), was the architect of more than 40,000 union-sponsored, publicly assisted, cooperative housing units in New York City. United States
- Kurt Jonas (1914, South Africa–1942, Erez Israel), was a South African architect. South Africa
- Nathan S. Joseph (17 December 1834, London, United Kingdom–1909), was a British architect, philanthropist, social reformer, and Jewish communal leader. United Kingdom
- Rudolf Joseph (14 August 1893, Pforzheim, Germany–17 January 1963, New York, NY). United States
- Erik Josephson (7 March 1864, Stockholm, Sweden–17 November 1929, Stockholm, Sweden), was a Swedish architect and known as an industry architect and specialist in bank buildings. Sweden

== K ==
- Boris Kagan (Russian: Борис Маркусевич Каган) (1949, USSR–), is a leading Ukrainian architect. USSR, Ukraine
- Uriel Kahana (ru) (Hebrew: אוריאל כהנא) (Russian: Уриэль Кахана) (1903, Kiev, Russian Empire–1965, Israel), was a well-known Israeli architect, artist, scholar, author and publisher. Erez Israel, Israel.
- Albert Kahn (21 March 1869, Rhaunen, Germany–8 December 1942, Detroit, MI), was the foremost American industrial architect of his day. United States
- Ely Jacques Kahn (1 June 1884, New York, NY–5 September 1972, New York, NY), was an American commercial architect who designed numerous skyscrapers in New York City in the 20th century. United States
- Julius Kahn (8 March 1874, Münstereifel, Germany–4 November 1942, Cleveland, OH), was an American engineer, industrialist, and manufacturer. United States
- Louis I. Kahn (20 February 1901, Kuressaare, Russian Empire–17 March 1974, New York, NY), was an influential, world-renowned Modernist architect and professor at Yale School of Architecture from 1947 to 1957. United States
- Gershen Kantorovich (ru) (Russian: Гершен Давидович Канторович) (18 December 1937, Leningrad, USSR–21 October 2003, Perm, Russia), was a renowned Soviet architect and preservationist. USSR, Russia
- Roy Herman Kantorowich (ru) (1917, South Africa–1996, Manchester, United Kingdom), was an internationally acclaimed South African and British architect, town planner, and educator. South Africa, United Kingdom
- Harold Kaplan (1895–1973) was a Canadian architect and co-founder, with Abraham Sprachman, of the Toronto architectural firm Kaplan & Sprachman, which specialized in the design of cinemas and other institutional buildings, including Shaarei Shomayim synagogue. Canada.
- Iosif Karakis (ru) (Russian: Иосиф Юльевич Каракис) (29 May 1902, Balta, Russian Empire–23 February 1988, Kiev, USSR), was a distinguished Soviet architect and educator. USSR
- Irma Karakis (de) (ru) (Russian: Ирма Иосифовна Каракис) (4 November 1930, Kiev, USSR–), was a Soviet architect and interior designer. USSR
- Dov Karmi (Hebrew: דב כרמי) (1905, Zhvanets, Russian Empire–14 May 1962, Tel Aviv, Israel), was a renowned Israeli architect awarded the Israel Prize for architecture in 1957. Erez Israel, Israel.
- Ram Karmi (Ram Carmi) (Hebrew: רמ כרמי) (1931, Jerusalem–11 April 2013), was a leading Israeli architect and head of the Tel Aviv-based Ram Karmi Architects company; known for his Brutalist style. Israel
- Ada Karmi-Melamede (Ada Carmi-Melamed) (Hebrew: מלמד–דה כרמיע) (24 December 1936, Tel Aviv, Israel–), is an Israeli architect who, with her brother, Ram Karmi, won an international competition in 1986 to design the Supreme Court of Israel compound. Israel
- Joseph Kashdan (1910–?, Israel), was a renowned Israeli architect. Erez Israel, Israel
- Nikolay Katsenelenbogen (ru) (Russian: Николай Давидович Каценеленбоген) (1879, Ponevezh, Russian Empire–1943, USSR), was a Russian and Soviet architect. Russian Empire, USSR
- Tamara Katsenelenbogen (ru) (Russian: Тамара Давыдовна Каценеленбоген) (1894, Dvinsk, Russian Empire–1976, Leningrad, USSR), was a Soviet Constructivist architect and urban planner. USSR
- Yuly Katsnelson (ru) (Russian: Юлий Израилевич Кацнельсон) (1928, Korma, USSR–), is a renowned Soviet and Russian architect. USSR, Russia
- Michael Lee Katzin US architect, architect of record for the National Center for Civil and Human Rights, Atlanta, GA, USA and many other renowned architectural projects in the United States
- Eugen Carl Kaufmann (Eugene Charles Kent) (8 January 1892, Frankfurt am Main, Germany–21 June 1984, London, United Kingdom), was a German, Soviet and British architect engaged at the New Frankfurt project under the leadership of Ernst May. Germany, USSR, United Kingdom
- Oskar Kaufmann (2 February 1873, Újszentanna, Austria-Hungary–8 September 1956, Budapest, Hungary), was a Hungarian-Jewish architect; an expert in construction and design in Berlin since 1900. Austria-Hungary, Germany, Erez Israel, Israel
- Richard Kauffmann (1887, Frankfurt, Germany–1958, Israel), was one of the leading architects of Erez Israel and Israel; designed several new Israeli cities, such as Afula and Herzliya. Germany, Erez Israel, Israel
- Nataliya Kazhdan (de) (ru) (Russian: Наталия Абрамовна Каждан) (1941, USSR–2017, Moscow, USSR), was a distinguished Soviet and Russian architect and educator. USSR, Russia
- Yakov Kazhdan (Russian: Яков Шаевич Каждан) (3 February 1922–), is a Soviet and Russian architectural educator. USSR, Russia
- Vladimir Khavin (ru) (Russian: Владимир Иосифович Хавин) (27 July 1931, Moscow, USSR–2005, Moscow, Russia), was a Soviet and Russian architect. USSR, Russia
- Izrail Khazanovsky (ru) (Russian: Израиль Самойлович Хазановский) (1901, Orel, Russian Empire–1985, Kharkiv, USSR), was a Soviet architect and educator. USSR
- Vadim Khesin (Russian: Вадим Александрович Хесин) (1959, Kharkiv, USSR–), is a Soviet and Ukrainian architect. USSR, Ukraine
- Lazar Khidekel (Russian: Лазарь Маркович Хидекель) (1904, Vitebsk, Russian Empire–1986, Leningrad, USSR), was an artist and architect, and one of the most important representatives of the Soviet avant-garde in the 1920s. USSR
- Lev Khidekel (ru) (Russian: Лев Маркович Хидекель) (1909, Vitebsk, Russian Empire–1977, Leningrad, USSR), was a Soviet architect. USSR
- Mark Khidekel (Russian: Марк Лазаревич Хидекель) (1946, Leningrad, USSR–), is an architect and designer; collaborated with Philip Johnson in 1995 on a large Russian-American urban project, The New Business Center in St. Petersburg. United States
- Roman Khiger (Russian: Роман (Рувим) Яковлевич Хигер) (1901, Russian Empire–1985, USSR), was a well known Soviet architect and architectural theoretician. USSR
- Frederick John Kiesler (né Friedrich Jacob Kiesler) (22 September 1890, Czernowitz, Austria-Hungary–27 December 1965, New York, NY), was a theater designer, artist, theoretician and architect. Austria, United States.
- Yisrael Kimhi (Jerusalem, Israel–), is an urban planner, senior researcher, and head of Jerusalem research at the Jerusalem Institute for Policy Research. Israel
- Lev Kisilevich (Russian: Лев Н. Кисилевич) was a Soviet architect, interior designer and author. USSR
- Ossip Klarwein (Hebrew: ארוויינלקוספ י) (6 February 1893, Warsaw, Russian Empire–9 September 1970, Jerusalem, Israel), was an architect in Germany and Israel, most of whose works were public and commercial buildings, as well as development plans for cities and neighborhoods in Israel. Erez Israel, Israel
- Alexander Klein (ru) (Russian: Александр Иванович Клейн) (17 June 1879, Odessa, Russian Empire–15 November 1961, New York, NY), was a Russian, German and Israeli architect and urban planner. Russian Empire, Germany, Erez Israel, United States
- Boris Klein (ru) (Russian: Борис Гершович Клейн) (14 September 1918, Kharkiv, USSR–20 May 2009, Longmeadow, MA), was a Soviet architect who emigrated to the US. USSR
- Roman Klein (né Robert Julius Klein) (Russian: Роман Иванович Клейн) (31 March 1858, Moscow, Russian Empire–3 May 1924, Moscow, USSR), was a Russian architect and educator, best known for his Neoclassical Pushkin Museum in Moscow. Russian Empire
- Zelman Kleinerman (ru) (Russian: Зельман Вениаминович Клейнерман) (1867, Belostok, Russian Empire–1930?, Samara, USSR), was a renowned Russian architect, best known for his Choral Synagogue in Samara. Russian Empire
- Yevsey Klevitsky (ru) (Russian: Евсей Менделевич Клевицкий) (1905, Russian Empire–1989, USSR), was a leading Soviet urban planner. USSR
- Rosa Grena Kliass (15 October 1932, São Roque, Brazil–), is a renowned pioneer in the field of landscape architecture. Brazil
- David Kogan (Russian: Давид Моисеевич Коган) (1884, Odessa, Russian Empire–1954, Moscow, USSR), was a Russian and Soviet architect. Russian Empire, United States
- Isaak Kogan (Russian: Исаак Аронович Коган) (1923, USSR–1998, Ukraine), was a Soviet architect. USSR
- A. Eugene Kohn (c. 1930, United States–), is an architect and co-founder of Kohn Pedersen Fox. United States
- Robert D. Kohn (12 May 1870, New York, NY–16 June 1953), was a one-time American Institute of Architects president, best known for his designs of reform synagogues and buildings for the New York Society for Ethical Culture.
- Ottó Komoly (26 March 1892, Budapest, Hungary–1 January 1945, Budapest, Hungary), was an architect and Zionist leader. Hungary
- Marcell Komor (hu) (7 November 1868, Pest, Austria-Hungary–29 November 1949, Sopronkeresztur, Hungary), was a leading Hungarian architect. Austria-Hungary, Hungary
- Arthur Korn (4 June 1891, Breslau, Germany–14 November 1978, Klosterneuberg, Austria), was a German architect, urban planner and a proponent of Modernism in Germany and the UK. Germany, United Kingdom
- Fritz Kornberg (14 January 1890, Bad Pyrmont, Germany–18 September 1944), was an acclaimed German and Erez Israel architect who designed the plans for Kibbutz Degania Bet and restored Beth Ticho and the Amphitheatre at Mount Scopus in Jerusalem, Israel. Germany, Erez Israel
- Yakov Kornfeld (ru) (Russian: Яков Абрамович Корнфельд) (23 February 1896, Berdichev, Russian Empire–4 June 1962, Moscow, USSR), was a leading Soviet architect and theoretician. USSR
- Lucjan Korngold (pl) (1 July 1897, Warsaw, Russian Empire–1963, São Paulo, Brazil), was an Erez Israel and Brazil architect. Erez Israel, Israel. Brazil
- Albert Kálmán Kőrössy (hu) (18 June 1869, Szeged, Austria-Hungary–21 April 1955, Budapest, Hungary), was a Hungarian architect. Austria-Hungary, Hungary
- Lajos Kozma (hu) (8 June 1884, Kiskorpád, Austria-Hungary–26 November 1948, Budapest, Hungary), was a Hungarian architect who made an indelible mark on early-20th-century European design, buildings and furniture. He was the father of the designer Susan Kozma-Orlay. Austria-Hungary, Hungary
- Samuil Kravets (ru) (Russian: Самуил Миронович Кравец) (27 August 1891, Vilna, Russian Empire–22 January 1966, Moscow, USSR), was a Soviet architect, best known for his Gosprom building in Kharkiv, USSR. USSR
- Reed Kroloff is an architect, critic, former editor of Architecture, former dean of Tulane School of Architecture, and director of Cranbrook Academy of Art. United States
- David Kroyanker (Hebrew: דוד קרוינקר) (1939, Jerusalem, Mandatory Palestine–), is an Israeli researcher and preservationist of historic neighborhoods and buildings in Jerusalem. Israel
- Dov Kutchinsky (1883, Cracow, Poland–1966, Israel), was an Erez Israel and Israel architect. Erez Israel, Israel.

== L ==
- Béla Lajta (until 1907 Béla Leitersdorfer) (23 January 1873, Budapest, Austria-Hungary−12 October 1920, Vienna, Austria), was a Hungarian architect who designed a number of buildings in the Hungarian offshoot style of Art Nouveau, called szecesszió. Austria-Hungary, Hungary
- Phyllis Lambert (née Phyllis Barbara Bronfman) (24 January 1927, Montreal, Canada–), is a Canadian architect, philanthropist and member of the Bronfman family. Canada
- Fritz Landauer (de) (13 June 1883, Augsburg, Germany–17 November 1968, London, United Kingdom), was an architect in Munich, Germany, before the Nazis forced him to flee the country in 1937. Germany
- Anton Lang (1 August 1860, Vienna, Austrian Empire–28 February 1940, Gars am Kamp, Germany), was a German architect. Germany
- Iosif Langbard (Russian: Иосиф Григорьевич Лангбард) (6 January 1882, Belsk, Russian Empire–3 January 1951, Leningrad, USSR), was a distinguished Soviet architect of many of the most important Soviet-era buildings in Minsk. USSR
- Arkady Langman (ru) (Russian: Аркадий Яковлевич Лангман) (31 October 1886, Kharkiv, Russian Empire–1968, Moscow, USSR), was a Soviet architect, best known for the building design for the Council of People's Commissariats (now Duma), Moscow. USSR
- Morris Lapidus (25 November 1902, Odessa, Russian Empire–18 January 2001, Miami Beach, FL), was an architect celebrated as an exemplar of Miami Modernist architecture (MiMo). United States.
- Denys Lasdun CH (8 September 1914, London, United Kingdom–11 January 2001, London, United Kingdom), was an eminent English architect of the 20th century among whose best known works is the Royal National Theatre in London. United Kingdom
- Paul László (6 February 1900, Debrecen, Austria-Hungary–27 March 1993, Santa Monica, CA), was an architect and interior designer whose work spanned eight decades and many countries. Germany, United States.
- Siegfried Latté (1884, Thorn, Germany–1938, Berlin, Germany), was a German architect and interior designer. Germany
- Edgar M. Lazarus (6 June 1868, Baltimore, MD–2 October 1939, Portland, OR), was an architect in the Portland, Oregon, area for more than 45 years and best known for the Vista House. United States
- Harold Le Roith (24 March 1905, Grahamstown, South Africa–4 July 1995), was an internationally acclaimed South African architect who was commissioned to design three synagogues in Johannesburg. South Africa
- David Froim Lebensold (fr) (1917, Warsaw, Poland−30 July 1985, Kingston, Canada), was a Canadian architect and theater design consultant. Canada,
- Ödön Lechner (né Eugen Lechner) (27 August 1845, Pest, Austrian Empire–10 June 1914, Budapest, Austria-Hungary), was a Hungarian architect, nicknamed the "Hungarian Gaudí," and whose work was submitted in 2008 for inclusion on the World Heritage List. Hungary
- Aleksandr Leibfreid (ru) (Russian: Александр Юрьевич Лейбфрейд) (3 October 1910, Kharkiv, Russian Empire–26 April 2003, Dortmund, Germany), was a renowned Soviet architect and researcher. USSR
- Moisey Lerman (ru) (Russian: Моисей Маркович Лерман) (1905, Vitebsk, Russian Empire–1993, Moscow, Russia), was a Soviet architect. USSR
- Rafael Lerman (1936, Jerusalem, Mandatory Palestine–), is a prize-winning Israeli architect. Israel
- Jaime Lerner (17 December 1937, Curitiba, Brazil – 27 May 2021), is a renowned architect and urban planner; elected in 1994 governor of Paraná, and re-elected in 1998. Brazil
- Moritz Ernst Lesser (1882, Berlin, Germany–1958, Lisbon, Portugal), was a German architect, forced by the Nazis to flee the country. Germany, Portugal
- Aleksandr Levi (Hebrew: אלכסנדר לוי) (Russian: Александр Леви) (Berlin, Germany–1943, Auschwitz, Poland).
- Rino Levi (31 December 1901, São Paulo, Brazil–29 September 1965, Morro do Chapéu, Brazil), was an architect important to the development of Modernism in Brazil. Brazil
- Zigfrid Levi (Russian: Зигфрид (Григорий) Яковлевич Леви) (1860–1913), was a Russian architect. Russian Empire
- Gino Levi-Montalcini (né Luigi Levi) (21 April 1902, Milan, Italy–29 November 1974, Turin, Italy), was an Italian architect, designer and educator. Italy
- Leonid Levin (ru) (Russian: Леонид Менделевич Левин) (25 July 1936, Minsk, USSR–1 March 2014, Minsk, Belarus), was a renowned Belarusian architect. USSR, Belarus
- Yevgeny Levinson (de) (ru) (Russian: Евгений Адольфович Левинсон) (19 October 1894, Odessa, Russian Empire–21 March 1968, Leningrad, USSR), was a Soviet architect, urban planner, and teacher. USSR
- Efim Levitan (ru) (Russian: Ефим Иосифович Левитан) (31 December 1915, Elizabethgrad, Russian Empire—21 September 2007, Volgograd, Russia), was a Soviet and Russian architect. USSR, Russia
- Ludwig Levy (18 April 1854, Landau, Germany–30 November 1907, Karlsruhe, Germany), was a German architect who designed a number of synagogues, among which was the huge Neue Synagoge in Strasbourg. Germany
- William Alexander Levy (later William Alexander) (21 October 1909, New York, NY–2 June 1997, West Hollywood, CA), was an American architect and interior designer, best known for the design and building of Hangover House in Laguna Beach, California. United States
- Shlomo Liaskovsky (ru) (Russian: Шломо Лясковский) (1903, Winterthur, Switzerland–after 1982, Argentina), was an Israeli and Argentinian architect. Erez Israel, Argentina.
- Daniel Libeskind (12 May 1946, Lodz, Poland–), is an American architect, artist, and set designer, known for the design and completion of the Jewish Museum in Berlin, Germany, which opened in 2001. United States
- Vladimir Libson (ru) (Russian: Владимир Яковлевич Либсон) (20 April 1910, Vitebsk, Russian Empire–21 September 1991, Moscow, USSR), was an acclaimed Soviet architect and renovator. USSR
- Irina Lichtenberg (Russian: Ирина Лихтенберг) (1958, Moscow, USSR–), is a Soviet and Israeli architect and town planner. USSR, Israel
- Viktor Lifshits (ru) (Russian: Виктор Исаакович Лифшиц) (1924, USSR–2013, Kharkiv, Ukraine), was a Soviet and Ukrainian architect and educator. USSR, Ukraine
- Yury Lifshits (Russian: Юрий Владимирович Лифшиц) (1921, Krasnodar, USSR–), is a Soviet architect, best known for the design of industrial buildings. USSR
- Eleonora Likhtenberg (ru) (Russian: Элеонора Яковлевна Лихтенберг) (1925, Kharkiv, USSR–), is a Soviet architect. USSR
- Yakov Likhtenberg (ru) (Russian: Яков Григорьевич Лихтенберг) (1899, Brest-Litovsk, Russian Empire–1982, Moscow, USSR), was an acclaimed Soviet architect. USSR
- Solomon Lisagor (ru) (Russian: Соломон Абрамович Лисагор) (24 May 1898, Riga, Russian Empire–1937, USSR), was a prominent Constructivist Soviet architect. USSR
- Aleksandr Lishnevsky (ru) (Russian: Александр Львович Лишневский) (1868, Kherson, Russian Empire–6 February 1942, Yaroslavl, USSR), was a noted Russian and Soviet Art Nouveau and Neoclassical architect and artist. Russian Empire, USSR
- El Lissitzky (Russian: Эль Лиси́цкий) (Yiddish: על ליסיצקי) (23 November 1890, Pochinok, Russian Empire–30 December 1941, Moscow, USSR), was a Russian artist, designer, photographer, typographer, polemicist, writer and architect. USSR
- Max Littmann (3 January 1862 – 20 September 1931), was a German architect who specialized in the design of theaters, department stores and spas. Germany
- Avi Livay (1965, Israel–), is a renowned Israeli architect and partner with Yoel Dvoriansky in Livay Dvoriansky Architects Ltd, founded in 2001. Israel
- Béla Löffler (1880, Budapest, Austria-Hungary–?), was a noted Hungarian architect. Hungary
- Samu Sándor Löffler (1877, Budapest, Austria-Hungary–?), was a noted Hungarian architect. Hungary
- Slavko Löwy (7 August 1904, Koprivnica, Austria-Hungary–1 April 1996, Zagreb, Croatia), was a well-known Croatian architect, best known for the nine-floor skyscraper on Masarykova Street in Zagreb (1933). Croatia
- Liya Loyevskaya (Russian: Лия Наумовна Лоевская) (1918, USSR–?), was a renowned Soviet architect. USSR
- Berthold Lubetkin (Russian: Бертольд Романович Любеткин) (14 December 1901, Tbilisi, Russian Empire—23 October 1990, Bristol, United Kingdom), was a Russian émigré architect who pioneered the International style in Britain in the 1930s. United Kingdom.
- Rudolf Lubinski (31 October 1873, Zagreb, Austria-Hungary–27 March 1935, Zagreb, Yugoslavia), was a leading Croatian Art Nouveau architect who designed numerous residential houses in Nazorova, Petrinjska and Masarykova Streets in Zagreb. Croatia
- Yehuda Lulka (1905, Vinnitsa, Russian Empire–1980, Israel), was a renowned Israeli architect. Erez Israel
- Dmitry Lurie (ru) (Russian: Дмитрий Ефимович Лурье) (1921, Cherikov, USSR–1993, Moscow, Russia), was a Soviet architect. USSR
- Leopold Lustig (1889, Kattowitz, Germany–1980, Tel Aviv, Israel), was an architect in Dresden, Germany, who resumed his career in Erez Israel after the Nazis forced him to flee Germany in 1934. Germany, Erez Israel, Israel.
- Inna Lyutomskaya (ru) (Russian: Инна Львовна Лютомская) (1925, Moscow, USSR–), is a leading Soviet and Russian architect. USSR

== M ==
- John Macsai (né János Lusztig) (20 May 1926, Budapest, Hungary–August 2017), was an acclaimed American architect. United States.
- Yehuda Magidovitch (Hebrew: יהודה מגידוביז) (1886, Uman, Russian Empire–1961, Tel Aviv, Israel), was the architect and general contractor who for about 20 years built most of the buildings in Tel Aviv. Erez Israel, Israel
- Paul Mandelstamm (Latvian: Pauls Mandelštams) (19 September 1872, Zhagory, Russian Empire–August, 1941, Riga, USSR), was an architect in Riga who designed more than 50 buildings in the Eclectic, Art Nouveau and Functionalist styles. USSR
- Alfred Mansfeld (Hebrew: אלפרד (אל) מנספלד) (2 March 1912, St. Petersburg, Russian Empire—15 March 2004, Haifa, Israel), was an Israeli architect and taught for over 40 years at the Technion – Israel Institute of Technology. Israel
- Fritz Marcus (Frederick Lucas Marcus) (ru) (19 July 1888, Dessau, Germany–8 September 1975, London, United Kingdom), was a German architect who fled the Nazis and became Head of Furniture and Interior Design at the Central School of Arts and Crafts in London. Germany, United Kingdom
- Emanuel Josef Margold (de) (4 May 1888, Vienna, Austria-Hungary–2 May 1962, Bratislava, Czechoslovakia), was a distinguished German architect and designer. Germany, Czechoslovakia
- Abraham Markusfeld (1904, Lodz, Russian Empire–? lost in Holocaust), was a Polish and Israeli architect. Poland, Erez Israel
- Oskar Marmorek (Hebrew: אוסקר מרמורק) (9 April 1863, Pieskowa Skała, Austria-Hungary–7 April 1909, Vienna, Austria-Hungary), was an Austro-Hungarian architect and Zionist. Austria-Hungary
- Géza Maróti (1 March 1875, Barsvörösvár, Austria-Hungary–6 May 1941, Budapest, Hungary), was a Hungarian architect, sculptor, painter, and applied artist, whose sculptures adorn the Franz Liszt Academy of Music in Budapest. Hungary
- Niccolò Matas (it) (6 December 1798, Ancona, Italy–11 March 1872, Florence, Italy), was an Italian architect of the polychrome Gothic façade of Basilica di Santa Croce in Florence (1857–63). Italy
- Edward Matasek (Eduard Matasek) (1867–1912), was an architect best known for his Sha'ar Hashamayim Synagogue in Cairo. Austria-Hungary, Ottoman Empire
- Rudolf Maté was a German architect who created a number of residential buildings and settlements in Berlin. Germany
- Frank Charles Mears (11 July 1880, Tynemouth, United Kingdom–25 January 1953), was one of Scotland's leading urban planners in the 1930s and 1940s. Scotland, United Kingdom
- Andrey Meerson (Russian: Андрей Дмитриевич Меерсон) (27 March 1930, Moscow, USSR–29 January 2020), was a leading Soviet and Russian architect. USSR, Russia
- Iosif Meerzon (Russian: Иoсиф Айзикович Меерзон) (1900, St. Petersburg, Russian Empire–1941, Leningrad, USSR), was a noted Soviet architect. USSR
- Richard Meier (12 October 1934, Newark, NJ–), is an American Pritzker prize-winning architect, whose Rationalist buildings make prominent use of the color white. United States
- Erich Mendelsohn (21 March 1887, Allenstein, Germany–15 September 1953, San Francisco, CA), was an architect and co-founder of the German Architectural Collaborative Der Ring, later practicing in Mandatory Palestine before settling in the US in 1941. Germany, Erez Israel, United States
- Alfred Messel (22 July 1853, Darmstadt, Germany−24 March 1909, Berlin, Germany), was one of the most well-known German architects at the turn of the 20th century, whose most famous work is the Wertheim department store on Leipziger Platz in Berlin, executed between 1896 and 1906. Germany
- Shmuel Mestechkin (ru) (Hebrew: שמואל מסטציקין) (Russian: Шмуэл Местечкин) (12 May 1908, Vasylkiv, Russian Empire–2 June 2004, Tel Aviv, Israel), was a leading Israeli architect. Erez Israel, Israel
- Hannes Meyer (Hans Emil "Hannes" Meyer) (18 November 1889, Basel, Switzerland–19 July 1954, Lugano, Switzerland), was a non-Jewish Swiss architect and second director of the Bauhaus in Dessau, Germany, from 1928 to 1930. Switzerland, Germany, USSR, Mexico.
- Claude Meyer-Levy (1908–2008), was a French architect, best known for his design of Synagogue de la Paix in Strasbourg. France
- Avraam Miletsky (ru) (Russian: Авраам Моисеевич Милецкий) (10 March 1918, Kiev, USSR–6 June 2004, Ashkelon, Israel), was a Soviet architect. USSR
- Adolf Minkus (ru) (Russian: Адольф Борисович Минкус) (21 September 1870, Odessa, Russian Empire–22 December 1948, USSR) was a Soviet architect. Russian Empire, USSR
- Mikhail Minkus (ru) (Russian: Михаил Адольфович Минкус) (25 December 1905, Odessa, Russian Empire–31 August 1963, Turku, Finland), was a Soviet architect. Russian Empire, USSR
- Moisey Mints (Russian: Моисей Львович Минц) (1908, Russian Empire–1994, Russia), was a Soviet architect. USSR
- Daniel Mintz (1961, Riga, USSR–), is an Israeli architect and educator. Israel
- Lev Misozhnikov (ru) (Russian: Лев Валентинович Мисожников) (22 March 1935, Moscow, USSR–2 August 2010, Russia), was a renowned Soviet and Russian architect. USSR, Russia
- David Mocatta (17 February 1806, London, Great Britain–1 May 1882, London, Great Britain), was a British architect and a member of the Anglo-Jewish Mocatta family; appointed architect of the London and Brighton Railway in 1839. United Kingdom
- Dagan Mochly (1957, Haifa, Israel–), is a noted Israeli architect; chief architect and owner of Mochly-Eldar Architects in Haifa. Israel
- Eric Moed (31 October 1987, New York, NY–), is an architect, public artist, educator, and founder of Office of Open Practice. United States
- Eric Owen Moss (25 July 1943, Los Angeles, CA–), is an architect with his eponymously named Los Angeles-based firm, whose urban revitalization project in Culver City, California, is on-going. United States
- Gennady Movchan (ru) (Russian: Геннадий Яковлевич Мовчан) (30 June 1901, Lapy, Russian Empire–2 November 1998, Moscow, Russia), was a Soviet architect and educator. USSR

== N ==
- Leo Nachtlicht (de) (12 August 1872, Bielitz, Austria-Hungary–22 September 1942, Berlin, Germany), was a German architect who was murdered by the Nazis. Germany.
- Barbara A. Nadel is an architect who specializes in healthcare and justice facilities and is editor of Building Security: Handbook for Architectural Planning and Design. United States
- Yury Naimark (Russian: Юрий Иосифович Наймарк) (1939, Kiev, USSR–), is a Soviet and Ukrainian architect and artist. USSR, Ukraine
- Fritz Nathan (de) (14 April 1891, Bingen am Rhein, Germany–3 November 1960, New York, NY), was one of the leading Jewish architects in Germany. Germany, United States
- Joseph Neufeld (he) (16 February 1899, Monastarjiska, Austria-Hungary–9 September 1980, New York, NY), was a German, Israeli and American architect. Germany, Erez Israel, United States
- Gustav Neustein (1880, Hammerstein, Germany–1963, New York, NY), was a German architect before he fled the Nazis and settled in America. Germany
- Richard Neutra (8 April 1892, Vienna, Austria-Hungary–16 April 1970, Wuppertal, West Germany), was an important Modernist architect known for rigorously geometric but airy structures that symbolized a West Coast variation on the mid-century modern residence. United States
- Aleksandr Nisselson (ru) (Russian: Александр Ефремович Ниссельсон) (1856, Russian Empire–1910, Russian Empire), was a Russian architect. Russian Empire
- Amnon Niv (Hebrew: אמנון ניב) (23 February 1930, Haifa, Mandatory Palestine–6 June 2011), was an Israeli architect and urban designer, and served as the chief architect for the Nuclear Research center in the Negev. Israel
- Iosif Notkin (ru) (Russian: Иосиф Исаакович Ноткин) (15 May 1928, Odessa, USSR–), is a well-known Soviet architect, renovator and writer. USSR
- Feliks Novikov (ru) (Russian: Феликс Аронович Новиков) (3 August 1927, Baku, USSR–), is a distinguished Soviet and Russian architect and writer. USSR, Russia

== O ==
- Mikhail Okhitovich (Russian: Михаил Александрович Охитович) (1896, St. Petersburg, Russian Empire–1937, Moscow, USSR), was a Bolshevik sociologist, town planner and Constructivist architectural theorist who was murdered by the KGB. USSR
- Rivka Oxman (1950–), is an architect, researcher, professor and author; awarded an Honorary Doctorate (Honoris Causas) by the Universitat Internacional de Catalunya in Barcelona. Israel

== P ==
- Gyula Pártos (né Julius Puntzmann) (17 August 1845, Apatin, Hungary–22 December 1916, Budapest, Austria-Hungary), was a Hungarian architect who designed the city halls of Szeged and Kecskemét with Ödön Lechner. Hungary
- Yury Paskevich (Russian: Юрий Абрамович Паскевич) (1931–6 September 2007, Kiev, Ukraine), was a Soviet architect. USSR
- Iosif Patskin (Russian: Иосиф Григорьевич Пацкин) (1925, Moscow, USSR–), is a Soviet and Russian architect. USSR, Russia
- Ephraim Henry Pavie (fr)(Hebrew: אפרים פאבי) (29 January 1947, Paris, France–), is an architect best known for his free-shaped biomorphic architecture. Israel
- Dan Peleg (1937, Poland–), is an Israeli architect. Israel.
- César Pelli (12 October 1926, San Miguel de Tucumán, Argentina–19 July 2019, New Haven, CT), was an American architect and the one-time dean of the Yale School of Architecture. United States
- Yevsey Perchenkov (ru) (Russian: Евсей Вульфович Перченков) (21 September 1929, Moscow, USSR–30 October 2020), was a leading Soviet architect. USSR
- Alexandre Persitz (4 June 1910, Moscow, Russian Empire–15 July 1975, Paris, France), was a French Modernist architect and writer; designed the Synagogue Don Isaac Abravanel with Arthur-Georges Héaume. France
- Nikolaus Pevsner CBE FBA (30 January 1902, Leipzig, Germany–18 August 1983, London, United Kingdom), was a British scholar of the history of art and architecture. United Kingdom
- Kurt Pick (1890, Lissa, Germany–1959, Tel Aviv, Israel), was a German architect and interior designer. Germany, Erez Israel, Israel.
- Doron Pinchas (Hebrew: דורון פנחס) is an Israeli architect and town planner. Israel.
- Jacob Pinkerfeld (Hebrew: יעקב פינקרפלד) (1 April 1897, Premissel, Austria-Hungary–23 September 1956, Ramat Rachel, Israel), was an Israeli architect and designer who built a large number of public structures and was murdered by Arab terrorists. Erez Israel, Israel.
- Rada Podgornaya (Russian: Рада Моисеевна Подгорная) (1911, Zhitomir, Russian Empire–1997, Kharkiv, Ukraine), was a Soviet architect. USSR
- Noi Podgorny (ru) (Russian: Ной Моисеевич Подгорный) (30 October 1897, Zhitomir, Russian Empire–1988, Kharkiv, USSR), was a Soviet architect. USSR
- Anatoly Pokrass (Russian: Анатолий Яковлевич Покрасс) (1922, Baku, USSR–), was a Soviet architect. USSR
- James Polshek (1930, Akron, OH–), is an American architect based in New York City and was dean of Columbia University's Graduate School of Architecture, Planning and Preservation for 15 years. United States
- Shlomo Ponaroff was a distinguished Israeli architect. Erez Israel
- Jan Hird Pokorny (25 May 1914, Brno, Austro-Hungarian Empire–20 May 2008, New York, NY)
- Nili Portugali (15 March 1948, Israel), Israeli practicing Architect; Senior lecturer; Researcher; Published author (& Film director). Graduated at the A.A School London; Post G in Architecture & Buddhism at UC-Berkeley USA. Research work and projects with Christopher Alexander / Center for Environmental Structure, Berkeley
- Julius Posener (4 November 1904, Berlin, Germany–26 January 1996, Berlin, Germany), was a German-Jewish architect, author, an historian in Berlin, and a professor at the Academy of Fine Arts in Berlin-Charlottenburg. Germany
- Joshua Prince-Ramus (11 August 1969, United States–), is an American architect, one of whose current projects is The Ronald O. Perelman Performing Arts Center at the World Trade Center in New York. United States
- Boris Printsker (ru) (Russian: Борис Абрамович Принцкер) (1910, Kiev, Russian Empire–1988, Kiev, USSR), was a Soviet architect. USSR
- Igor Pritsker (ru) (Russian: Игорь Аркадьевич Притцкер) (26 March 1953, Kuibyshev, USSR–), is a Soviet and Russian architect. USSR, Russia
- Martin Punitzer (7 July 1889, Berlin, Germany–7 October 1949, Santiago, Chile), was a German architect of the New Objectivity, who worked in Berlin in the 1920s and was forced by the Nazis to flee the country. Germany, Chile

== Q ==
- Zsigmond Quittner (né Sigismund Quittner) (13 February 1859, Pest, Austria-Hungary–25 October 1918, Vienna, Austria-Hungary), was a Hungarian architect whose style was eclectic and a commercial version of the Vienna Secession movement. Hungary

== R ==
- Yury Rabayev (ru) (Russian: Юрий Романович Рабаев) (September 1927, Makhachkala, USSR–May 1993, Moscow, Russia), was a Soviet and Russian architect. USSR, Russia
- Georgy Rabinovich (Russian: Георгий Исаакович Рабинович) (1925, Moscow, USSR–), is a Soviet and Russian architect. USSR Russia
- Mikhail Rabinovich (ru) (Russian: Михаил Самуилович Рабинович) (3 January 1954, Kharkiv, USSR–), is a leading Soviet and Ukrainian architect. USSR, Ukraine
- Michael Rachlis (1884, Moscow, Russian Empire–1953, London, United Kingdom), was a successful Russian, German and British architect. Russian Empire, Germany, United Kingdom
- Amos Rapoport (28 March 1929, Warsaw, Poland–), is an architect, one of the founders of Environment-Behavior Studies (EBS) and is the author of over 200 academic publications.
- Yitzhak Rapoport (1901, Berdichev, Russian Empire–1989, Israel), was an Israeli architect. Erez Israel, Israel
- Johanan (Yohanan) Ratner (ru) (Russian: Иоханан Ратнер) (1891, Odessa, Russian Empire–1965, Haifa, Israel), was one of the leading Israeli Modernist architects in Erez Israel and a politician. Erez Israel, Israel.
- Mark Ratner (Russian: Марк Моисеевич Ратнер). USSR
- Heinrich Heinz Rau (10 November 1896, Berlin, Germany–13 February 1965, Bad Teinach im Schwarzwald, Germany), was a German and Israeli architect who designed small residential buildings in Jerusalem, Haifa and Tel Aviv. Germany, Erez Israel, Israel
- Yaakov Rechter (Hebrew: יעקב רכטר) (14 June 1924, Tel Aviv, Erez Israel–28 April 2001, Kibbutz Shfayim, Israel), was a distinguished Israeli architect and designer of the Charles Bronfman Auditorium in Tel Aviv, 1957. Israel
- Zeev Rechter (Hebrew: זאב רכטר) (12 April 1899, Kovalevka, Russian Empire–18 December 1960, Tel Aviv, Israel), was a leading Israeli architect and designed the Binyanei HaUma (International Convention Center) in Jerusalem. Erez Israel, Israel.
- David Resnick (also Resnik or Reznik) (5 August 1924, Rio de Janeiro, Brazil–4 November 2012, Israel), was an Israeli architect and winner of the Israel Prize for architecture and whose works include Yad Kennedy and the Israel Goldstein Synagogue. Israel
- Abram Rivkin (ru) (Russian: Абрам Бенцианович Ривкин) (1914, Starodub, Russian Empire–1993, Chelyabinsk, USSR), was a successful Soviet architect and educator. USSR
- Ernesto Nathan Rogers (16 March 1909, Trieste, Italy–7 November 1969), was an Italian architect, writer and educator, known for the Torre Velasca (Velasca Tower), located in the historic city center of Milan. Italy
- Richard Rogers CH Kt FRIBA (Baron Rogers of Riverside) (23 July 1933, Florence, Italy – 18 December 2021), was a British architect noted for his Modernist and Functionalist designs. United Kingdom
- William H. Rogers (18 February 1914 – 26 July 2008), was an English architect whose most notable building was 20 Fenchurch Street in the City of London. United Kingdom
- Ernő Román (hu) (4 May 1883, Budapest, Austria-Hungary–5 April 1959, Budapest, Hungary), was a Hungarian architect. Hungary
- Miklós Román (hu) (8 June 1879, Budapest, Austria-Hungary–15 January 1945, Budapest, Hungary), was a Hungarian architect. Hungary
- Eugene Rosenberg (né Evžen Rosenberg) (24 February 1907, Topoľčany, Slovakia–21 November 1990, London, United Kingdom), was a Slovak Modernist architect and established the firm Yorke Rosenberg Mardall with F. R. S. Yorke and C. S. Mardall that was responsible for a number of innovative architectural projects such as Gatwick Airport. United Kingdom.
- Harry Rosenthal (Posen, Germany–1966, London, United Kingdom), was a successful German architect, before he was forced by the Nazis to flee the country. Germany, Erez Israel, United Kingdom.
- Sharon Rotbard (Hebrew: שרון רוטברד) (2 October 1959, Tel Aviv, Israel–), is an Israeli architect, publisher, author, and senior lecturer in the architecture department of Bezalel Academy, Jerusalem. Israel
- Emery Roth (né Róth Imre) (1871, Gálszécs, Austria-Hungary–20 August 1948, New York, NY), was an apprentice to Daniel Burnham and architect of classic Jazz Age New York apartment buildings and hotels; founded the firm Emery Roth & Sons. United States
- Julian Roth (2 September 1902 – 9 December 1992), was an American architect who with his brother, Richard, led Emery Roth & Sons after their father's death. United States
- Richard Roth, Jr., was an American architect who with his brother, Julian, led Emery Roth & Sons after their father's death. United States
- Mark Rozenberg (ru) (Russian: Марк Борисович Розенберг) (1939, Moscow, USSR–), is a Soviet architect. USSR
- Zinovy Rozenfeld (ru) (Russian: Зиновий Моисеевич Розенфельд) (1904, Chashniki, Russian Empire–1991, Moscow, USSR), was a Soviet architect. USSR
- Konstantin Rozenshtein (ru) (Russian: Константин Исаевич Розенштейн) (1878, Odessa, Russian Empire–1951, Leningrad, USSR), was a Russian and Soviet architect and real estate developer. Russian Empire, USSR
- Meer Rozenson (ru) (Russian: Меер Давидович Розензон), was a Russian architect. Russian Empire
- Yakov Rubanchik (Russian: Яков Осипович Рубанчик) (29 June 1899, Taganrog, Russian Empire–20 December 1948, Leningrad, USSR), was a Soviet architect and artist; part of the Leningrad-based ASNOVA (Association of New Architects), an avant-garde architectural association. USSR
- Boris Rubanenko (ru) (Russian: Борис Рафаилович Рубаненко) (16 August 1910, Samara, Russian Empire–6 May 1985, Moscow, USSR), was a Soviet architect. USSR
- Carl Rubin (24 June 1899, Sniatyn, Austria-Hungary−7 February 1955, Tel Aviv, Israel), was an architect mostly active in the International style, with projects focused around Tel Aviv. Austria-Hungary, Erez Israel, Israel
- Bernard Rudofsky (19 April 1905, Suchdol nad Odru, Austria-Hungary–12 March 1988, New York, NY), was an American writer, architect, collector, teacher, designer, and social historian. United States.
- Fritz Ruhemann (Friedrich Abraham Ruhemann) (8 May 1891, Berlin, Germany–November 1982, London, United Kingdom), was a successful German and British architect. Germany, United Kingdom

== S ==
- Alexander Saeltzer (31 July 1814, Eisenach, Germany—23 September 1883, New York, NY), was the architect of a synagogue, theaters, and the Jacob Astor Library. United States
- Moshe Safdie CC FAIA (Hebrew: משה ספדיה) (14 July 1938, Haifa, Israel–), is an architect, urban planner, educator, theorist, and author; best known for designing Marina Bay Sands and Jewel Changi Airport, as well as his debut project, Habitat 67. Israel, Canada, United States
- Stanley Saitowitz (1949, Johannesburg, South Africa–), is an architect and emeritus architecture professor at UC Berkeley. United States
- Edward Salomons (1828–1906), was active in late 19th-century Manchester and designed the Manchester Jewish Museum. United Kingdom
- Grigory Sayevich (ru) (Russian: Григорий Ефимович Саевич) (1936, Moscow, USSR–2009, Moscow, Russia) was a Soviet and Russian architect. USSR
- Lawrence Scarpa (28 October 1959, New York, NY–), is an architect based in Los Angeles and known for the creative use of conventional materials in unique and unexpected ways. United States
- Richard Scheibner (sk) (1880, Trenčín, Austria-Hungary–?), was a German architect lost in the Holocaust. Germany
- Ionel Schein (fr) (1927, Bucharest, Romania–30 December 2004, Paris, France), was a French architect, a pioneer in the use of synthetic materials, and created the first plastic house in 1956. France
- Rudolph Schindler (né Rudolf Michael Schlesinger) (10 September 1887, Vienna, Austria-Hungary–22 August 1953, Los Angeles, CA), was a Modernist architect known for his private houses in Los Angeles. United States
- Patrik Schumacher (1961–) is an architect and director of Zaha Hadid Architects who coined the term Parametricism for an avant-garde architectural style. United Kingdom
- Amnon Schwartz is a successful Israeli architect and co-designer with Amnon Niv of the Moshe Aviv Tower. Israel
- Frederic Schwartz (1 April 1951, New York, NY–28 April 2014, New York, NY), was an award-winning American architect, author and city planner whose work includes Empty Sky, the New Jersey 9-11 Memorial, dedicated in Liberty State Park on 11 September 2011. United States
- Martha Schwartz (21 November 1950, Philadelphia, PA–), is a landscape architect and educator; founding principal of Martha Schwartz Partners, an architecture firm based in London, New York City, and Shanghai. United States
- Simon I. Schwartz (1877–1956), was a partner of Schwartz and Gross, designer of pre-WWII Manhattan apartment buildings. United States
- Denise Scott Brown (née Lakofski) (3 October 1931, Nkana, Northern Rhodesia–), is an architect, city planner and partner/spouse of architect Robert Venturi. United States.
- Harry Seidler AC OBE (25 June 1923, Vienna, Austria—9 March 2006, Sydney, Australia), was the first architect to fully express the principles of the Bauhaus in Australia. Australia.
- Richard Seifert (25 November 1910, Zurich, Switzerland–26 October 2001), was an architect best known for designing the Centrepoint tower and Tower 42 or the NatWest Tower, formerly the tallest building in the City of London. United Kingdom
- Werner Seligmann (30 March 1930, Osnabrück, Germany–12 November 1998, United States), was an architect, urban designer and educator. United States
- Abram Shapiro (ru) (Russian: Абрам Генрихович Шапиро) (1927, Lugansk, USSR–1995, Moscow, Russia), was a successful Soviet architect. USSR
- Arieh Sharon (né Ludwig Kurzmann) (Hebrew: אריה שרון) (28 May 1900, Jarosław, Austria-Hungary–24 July 1984, Paris, France), was an Israeli architect and winner of the Israel Prize for architecture in 1962, the first in this discipline. Germany, Erez Israel, Israel.
- Derek Joseph Sharp is a British architect who formed the Derek Sharp Partnership and later became a partner in Comprehensive Design Group. United Kingdom
- Zadok Sherman (1944, USSR–), is a successful Israeli architect. Israel
- Viktor Shifrin (Russian: Виктор Моисеевич Шифрин) (1931, Moscow, USSR–), is a successful Soviet and Israeli architect. USSR, Israel
- Zaki Shlush (Zaki Chelouche)] (Hebrew: זכי שלוש) (1894, Jaffa–1975), worked for his own firm 1928–1934 and simultaneously served as a member in the Tel-Aviv Committee for Cities Designing. Erez Israel, Israel
- Semyon Shoikhet (ru) (Russian: Семен Михайлович Шойхет) (1 January 1931, Dubossary, USSR–24 December 2010, Germany), was a Soviet architect. USSR
- Anna Shpirtus (Russian: Анна Ароновна Шпиртус) (1907, Russian Empire–), is a Soviet architect. USSR
- Yakov Shteinberg (ru) (Russian: Яков Аронович Штейнберг) (25 April 1896, Kiev, Russian Empire–11 February 1982, Kiev, USSR), was a Soviet architect, educator and scholar. USSR
- Grigory Shubik (ru) (Russian: Григорий Моисеевич Шубик) (1920, USSR–), is a successful Soviet architect. USSR
- Igor Shubik (Russian: Игорь Григорьевич Шубик) (1942, USSR–), is a Soviet, Ukrainian and Israeli architect. USSR, Ukraine, Israel.
- Ella Shur (ru) (Russian: Элла Моисеевна Шур) (1928, USSR–), is a Soviet architect. USSR
- Isaak Shvartsev (Russian: Исаак Сергеевич Шварцев) (1949, Kishinev, USSR–), is a Moldovan Soviet architect, known for his work in Kishinev. USSR
- Galina Simanovskaya (Russian: Галина Львовна Симановская) (1946, Kharkiv, USSR–), is a Soviet and Ukrainian architect. USSR, Ukraine
- Otto G. Simonson (1862, Dresden–25 June 1922, Baltimore, MD), was Superintendent of Public Buildings for the US and designed many public buildings and residences in Baltimore. Germany, United States
- Oskar Singer (27. 10. 1899 Dolné Vestenice, Austro Hungarian Empire – † 1972 London, Great Britain), was an modernist architect who emigrated to London in 1939. He also worked in Peshawar, Pakistan between 1952-1958.
- Mikhail Sinyavsky (ru) (Russian: Михаил Исаакович Синявский) (1895, Odessa, Russian Empire–1979, Moscow, USSR), was a distinguished Soviet architect and educator. USSR
- Jacob Ben Sira (ru)itect and engineer in Tel Aviv. Erez Israel
- Grigory Slutsky (ru) (Russian: Григорий Маркович Слуцкий) (8 September 1916, Kiev, Russian Empire–1 March 1990, Kiev, USSR), was a Soviet architect. USSR
- Iliya Smolyar (ru) (Russian: Илья Моисеевич Смоляр) (1928, Moscow, USSR– 2008, Moscow, Russia), was a renowned Soviet and Russian architect and urban planner. USSR, Russia
- Adam Sokol, founder of the Adam Sokol Architecture Practice (asap/)
- Hayim (Monia) Sokolinsky (1896, Russian Empire–1961, Israel), was an Israeli architect. Erez Israel, Israel
- Lewis Solomon (14 March 1848, London, United Kingdom–1928). United Kingdom
- Zinoviy Sominsky (ru) (Russian: Зиновий Самойлович Соминский) (5 February 1917, Petrograd, Russian Empire–10 September 1995), was a Soviet architect. USSR
- Yury Somov (ru) (Russian: Юрий Соломонович Сомов) (1918, Gadyach, USSR–2004, Moscow, Russia), was a Soviet architect and interior designer. USSR
- Raphael Soriano (1 August 1904, Rhodes, Greece–21 July 1988, Claremont, CA), was an architect and educator whose work epitomized mid-century modern. United States.
- Michael Sorkin (2 August 1948, Washington, DC–26 March 2020, New York, NY), was an American architectural and urban critic, designer, and educator; founder of Michael Sorkin Studio, a global design practice with special interests in urban planning, urban design and green urbanism. United States
- Sergey Speransky (ru) (Russian: Сергей Борисович Сперанский) (23 May 1914, Kazan, Russian Empire–13 March 1983, Leningrad, USSR), was a Soviet architect. USSR
- Abraham Sprachman (15 January 1896, Honczarov, Austria-Hungary–6 August 1971, Toronto, Canada), was a Canadian theatrical and institutional architect; partner of Kaplan & Sprachman, a firm that designed 70%–80% of all movie theaters in Canada from 1919–1950. Canada
- Mandel Sprachman (1925, Toronto, Canada–2002, Toronto, Canada), was a Canadian theatrical and institutional architect. Canada.
- Clarence Stein (19 June 1882, Rochester, NY–7 February 1975), was an American urban planner, architect and writer best known for advancing the Garden City movement in the US. United States
- Andrew Steiner (also known as Endre, André, or Andrej Steiner) (22 August 1908, Dunaszerdahely, Austria-Hungary–2 April 2009, Atlanta, GA), was a Czechoslovak-American architect who participated in Jewish resistance to the Holocaust as a member of the Bratislava Working Group, an underground Jewish organization. Czechoslovakia, United States
- Robert Stern (1885, Cologne, Germany−1964, New York, NY), was a renowned German architect working in Cologne before he was forced by the Nazis to emigrate to London in 1936. Germany, United States
- Robert A. M. Stern (23 May 1939, New York, NY–), is an American architect and was dean of the Yale University School of Architecture from 1998 to 2016. United States
- Wilhelm Stiassny (1842, Pressburg, Austria-Hungary–1910, Bad Ischl, Austria-Hungary), was an Austro-Hungarian architect who oversaw the construction of 180 palaces, schools, residences, factories, hospitals, and synagogues. Austria-Hungary
- Judith Stolzer-Segall (20 May 1904, Riga, Russian Empire–12 January 1990, Munich, Germany), was an Israeli architect who won the commission for the design of the Central Synagogue of Hadera. Erez Israel, Israel
- Eugen Stolzer (12 May 1886, Győr, Austria-Hungary–22 December 1958, Rome, Italy), was an Israeli architect. Austria-Hungary, Erez Israel, Israel
- Arieh Streimer (1897, Russian Empire–1967, Israel), was an Israeli architect. Erez Israel
- Oskar Strnad (26 October 1879, Vienna, Austria-Hungary–3 September 1935, Bad Aussee, Austria), was an Austrian architect, sculptor, designer and set designer for films and theaters. Austria-Hungary, Austria
- Joseph Sunlight (2 January 1889, Novogrudok, Russian Empire–15 April 1978), was a Russian/English architect and designer of Sunlight House. Great Britain
- Yakov Svirsky (ru) (Russian: Яков Осипович Свирский) (1902–1990?), was a Soviet architect. USSR
- Harley Swedler (16 April 1962, Ottawa, Canada–), is an architect whose projects have been exhibited at Palais de Tokyo, Jüdisches Museum in Berlin, and New York's The Jewish Museum; worked with Diller Scofidio + Renfro, Richard Meier + Partners, and Martha Stewart Living.
- Helena Syrkus (née Niemirowska) (14 May 1900, Warsaw, Russian Empire–19 November 1982, Warsaw, Poland), was an architect active in the Congrès Internationaux d'Architecture Moderne (CIAM). Poland
- Szymon Syrkus (pl) (1893, Warsaw, Russian Empire–1964, Warsaw, Poland), was an architect and theoretician of architecture. Poland
- Nitza Metzger Szmuk (1945, Tel Aviv, Israel–), is an architect, professor and author of Dwelling on the Dunes—Tel Aviv Modern Movement and Bauhaus Ideals. Israel

== T ==
- Edgar Tafel (12 March 1912, New York, NY–18 January 2011, New York, NY), was an American architect and a disciple of Frank Lloyd Wright who designed St. John's in the Village Episcopal Church in Manhattan's Greenwich Village. United States
- Iliya Talalai (ru) (Russian:, Илья Владимирович Талалай) (11 August 1934, Leningrad, USSR–14 September 1987, Chelyabinsk, USSR), was a Soviet architect. USSR
- Eugenio Gentili Tedeschi (14 March 1916, Turin, Italy–14 April 2005, Milan, Italy), was an Italian architect, designer, teacher and writer who managed the rebuilding of the Heichal David u-Mordechai Synagogue in Milan in the early 1950s. Italy
- Stanley Tigerman (20 September 1930, Chicago, IL–3 June 2019), was an American architect, theorist and designer who designed the Illinois Holocaust Museum and Education Center in Skokie, Illinois. United States
- Heinrich Tischler (de) (25 May 1892, Cosel, Germany–16 December 1938, Breslau, Germany), was a German architect, interior designer, painter and graphic artist, who died from injuries sustained in the Buchenwald concentration camp. Germany
- Naum Trakhtenberg (ru) (Russin: Наум Ефимович Трахтенберг) (4 January 1909, Bakhmach, Russian Empire–16 October 1977, Minsk, USSR), was a Soviet architect. USSR
- Norbert Troller (1896, Bruenn, Austria-Hungary–1984, New York, NY), was a Czech and American architect who designed Jewish community centers in the US, Canada and Colombia. Czechoslovakia, United States
- Noi Trotsky (Russian: Ной Абра́мович Тро́цкий) (15 March 1895, St. Petersburg, Russian Empire–19 November 1940, Leningrad, USSR), was a renowned Soviet architect whose best-known project is the House of Soviets in St. Petersburg. USSR
- Fedor Troupyansky (ru) (Russian: Федор Абрамович Троупянский) (14 May 1874, Odessa, Russian Empire–12 May 1949, Odessa, USSR), was a famous Russian and Soviet architect. Russian Empire, USSR
- Yuly Tsaune (ru) (Russian: Юлий Семенович Цауне) (4 March 1862, Saaremaa, Russian Empire–1930, Kharkiv, USSR), was a renowned Russian and Soviet architect. Russian Empire, USSR
- Manuil Tseil (ru) (Russian: Мануил Александрович Цейль) was a Russian architect. Russian Empire
- Semyon Tulchinsky (Russian: Семен Абрамович Тульчинский) (1914, Russian Empire–1994, Kharkiv, Ukraine), was a Soviet architect and educator. USSR
- Moshe Tzur (1948, Tel Aviv, Israel–), is an Israeli architect. Israel

== U ==
- Joseph Urban (26 May 1872, Vienna, Austria-Hungary–10 July 1933, New York, NY), was an Austrian-American architect, illustrator, and scenic designer.

== V ==
- Pierre Vago (30 August 1910, Budapest, Austria-Hungary–1 February 2002, Noisy-sur-École, France), was a notable French architect who worked on the Hansaviertel in Berlin. France, Germany
- Samuil Vainshtein (ru) (Russian: Самуил Миронович Вайнштейн) (12 February 1918, Kiev, USSR–21 April 1996, Kiev, Russia), was a Soviet and Russian architect. USSR, Russia

== W ==
- Gregori Warchavchik (2 April 1896, Odessa, Russian Empire–27 July 1972, São Paulo, Brazil), was a successful Brazilian architect who designed the Lasar Segall Museum in São Paulo that opened in 1967. Brazil
- Václav Weinzett (4 January 1862, Straz, Austria-Hungary–24 April 1930, Prague, Czechoslovakia), was a distinguished Bohemian and Moravian architect. Austria-Hungary, Czechoslovakia
- Eyal Weizman (1970, Haifa, Israel–), is a British-Israeli architect and the director of the research agency Forensic Architecture at Goldsmiths, University of London. Israel, United Kingdom
- Rudolf Wels (28 April 1882, Osek, Bohemia–8 March 1944, Auschwitz, Poland), was a Czech architect active in western Bohemia and Prague. Czechoslovakia
- Ernst Wiesner (né Arnošt Wiesner) (21 January 1890, Malacky, Austria-Hungary–15 July 1971, Liverpool, United Kingdom), was a Modernist architect and one of the foremost interwar period architects of Brno. Czechoslovakia
- Rachel Wischnitzer (German: Rahel Wischnitzer-Bernstein) (14 April 1885, Minsk, Russian Empire–20 November 1989, New York, NY), was an architect and art historian; art and architecture editor of the Encyclopaedia Judaica, from 1928 to 1934, and worked with the Jewish Museum Berlin. Germany, United States
- Adolf Wolff (de) (10 August 1832, Esslingen, Germany–29 March 1885, Stuttgart, Germany), was an architect active in Stuttgart. Germany
- Richard Wolffenstein (7 September 1846, Berlin, Germany–13 April 1919, Berlin, Germany), was a founding member of the Vereinigung Berliner Architekten. Germany
- Hans Norbert Wormann (1898, Berlin, Germany–1982, Florida), was a successful American architect. Germany, United States

== Y ==
- Avraham Yaski (Hebrew: אברהם יסקי) (14 April 1927, Kishinev, Romania–28 March 2014), was an Israeli architect, founded the architectural firm now known as Moore Yasky Sivan Architects, and in 1982 was awarded the Israel Prize in architecture. Erez Israel, Israel

== Z ==
- Julian Zachariewicz (17 July 1837, Lemberg, Austrian Empire–27 December 1898, Lvov, Russian Empire), was a Polish architect and renovator who supervised (alongside Franciszek Skowron) the construction of more than 100 pavilions for the General National Exhibition in Lviv, Ukraine. Russian Empire
- Viktor Zaidenberg (Russian: Виктор Абрамович Зайденберг). USSR
- Nahum Zalkind (Russian: Нахум Залкинд) (1895, Russian Empire–1976, Israel), was a German and Israeli architect. Germany, Israel.
- Mikhail Zapol (ru) (Russian: Михаил Юделевич Заполь) (20 November 1914, Krasnaya Sloboda, Russian Empire–?), was a Soviet architect. USSR
- Moshe Zarhy (1923, Jerusalem, Mandatory Palestine–), is an Israeli architect and founder of Zarhy Architects in Tel Aviv. Israel
- Abram Zaslavsky (ru) (Russian: Абрам Моисеевич Заславский) (9 April 1899, Odessa, Russian Empire–22 September 1962, Moscow, USSR), was a Soviet architect. USSR
- Iosif Zektser (ru) (Russian: Иосиф Абрамович Зекцер) (1867, Vinnitsa, Russian Empire–1933, Kiev, USSR), was a Russian and Soviet architect. Russian Empire, USSR
- Adolf Noyevich Zeligson (ru) (Russian: Адольф Ноевич Зелигсон) (1867, Warsaw, Russian Empire–10 June 1919, Lodz, Poland), was a renowned Russian architect. Russian Empire
- Bruno Zevi (22 January 1918, Rome, Italy–9 January 2000, Rome, Italy), was an Italian architect, historian, professor, curator, author and editor. Italy
- Luca Zevi (1948–), is an Italian architect, professor, curator and author. Italy
- Aleksandr Zhuk (ru) (Russian: Александр Владимирович Жук) (18 June 1917, Kiev, Russian Empire–4 January 2008, St. Petersburg, Russia), was a renowned Soviet and Russian architect. USSR, Russia
- Martin Ziegler (1896, Vienna, Austria-Hungary–12 August 1974, New York, NY), was an Austrian architect. Austria
- Bernard Zimmerman (22 April 1930, Cleveland, CA–4 June 2009, Los Angeles, CA), was an American architect, urban planner, educator and preservationist; helped create the Department of Architecture at California State Polytechnic University, Pomona. United States
- Moshe Zippor (1931, Tel Aviv, Israel–), is an Israeli architect. Israel
- Alejandro Zohn (né Alexander Zohn) (8 August 1930, Vienna, Austria–2000, Guadalajara, Mexico), was a Mexican architect notable for the acoustic shell in Agua Azul Park (1958), the Libertad Market (1959), and the Adolfo López Mateos sports center (1962), all in Guadalajara. Mexico.
- Alfred Zucker (23 January 1852, Freiburg, Prussia– 2 August 1913, Buenos Aires, Argentina), was an American architect who briefly served as State Architect of Mississippi. United States, Argentinea.
- Paul Zucker (14 August 1888, Berlin, Germany–14 February 1971, New York, NY), was an architect and city planner in Berlin who joined the University in Exile at the New School for Social Research. United States.
- Anatol Zukerman (Russian: Анатолий Анатольевич Цукерман) (1937, Kharkiv, USSR–), was a Soviet and American architect. USSR, United States
- Georgy Zunblat (ru) (Russian: Георгий Александрович Зунблат) (1898, St. Petersburg, Russian Empire–1979, Moscow, USSR), was a renowned Soviet architect. Russian Empire, USSR
