= Persitz =

Persitz is an Ashkenazi surname. Notable people with the surname include:

- Alexandre Persitz (1910–1975), French architect
- Raaphi Persitz (1934–2009), English–Israeli–Swiss chess master and financial analyst
- Shoshana Persitz (1892–1969), Israeli politician, educator, and Zionist activist
