= Kiskorpád =

- Village
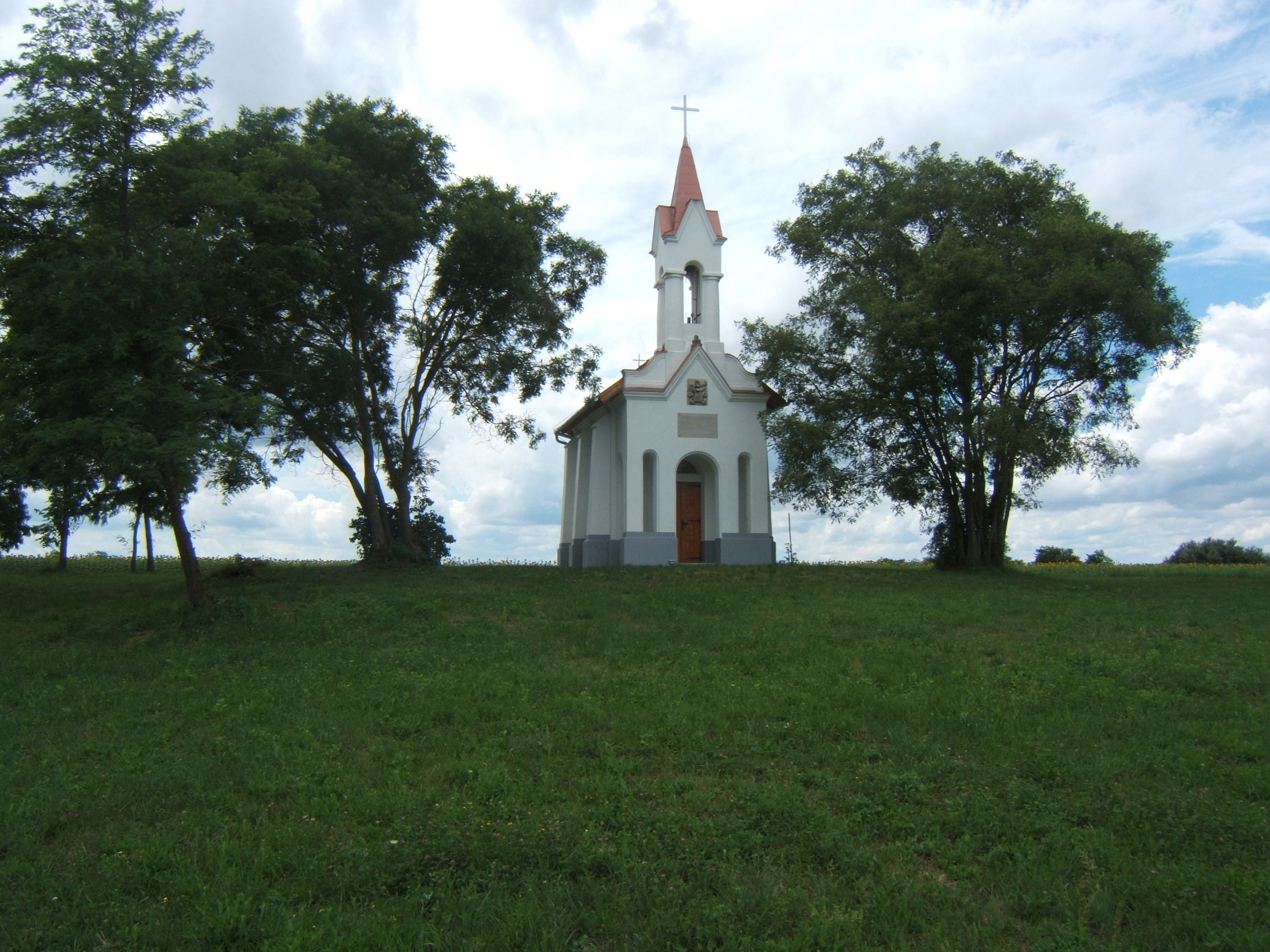
- Kapotsfy Chapel in Kiskorpád

- Coat of arms

- Location of Somogy county in Hungary

- Location of Kiskorpád
- Coordinates: 46.35618°N 17.59483°E
- Country: Hungary
- Region: Southern Transdanubia
- County: Somogy
- District: Kaposvár
- RC Diocese: Kaposvár

Area
  - Total: 16.95 km^{2} (6.54 sq mi)

Population (2017)
  - Total: 881
  - Density: 52.0/km^{2} (135/sq mi)
- Demonym: kiskorpádi
- Time zone: UTC+1 (CET)
  - Summer (DST): UTC+2 (CEST)
- Postal code: 7524
- Area code: (+36) 82
- NUTS 3 code: HU232
- MP: Anita Szilvási
- Website: Kiskorpád Online

Kiskorpád is a village in Somogy county, Hungary.

== Geography ==
It lies 14 km (8.7 mi) west of Kaposvár, next to the road 61 and the Dombóvár-Gyékényes Railway Line.

== History ==
It was first mentioned as Villa Curpad in 1324 in an official document. The papal tithe registration refers to the village as a settlement with a parish. During the Turkish occupation it appears in the tax registration of the Ottoman Porte. In the beginning of 18th century its name was Pusztakorbád and its landowners were the Sárközy, Visy and Tallián families. According to László Szita the settlement was completely Hungarian in the 18th century.

In 1798–1799 Mihály Csokonai Vitéz was the guest of the Sárközy family who wrote several of his well known poems there. In the 20th century there was a steam mill, a cement and a tile factory.

== Main sights ==
- Reformed Church (built in late Baroque style in 1789
- Kapotsfy Chapel
- River Kapos has its source in the village
- Lake Szigetes (fish pond)

== Notable residents ==
- Lajos Kozma (1884–1948), Hungarian architect, industrial designer, graphic artist, and critic
- Susan Kozma-Orlay (née Zsuzsa Kozma; 1913–2008), Hungarian–Australian modernist designer
- János Hóvári (1955–2023), Hungarian historian, turkologist, diplomat

== Gallery ==
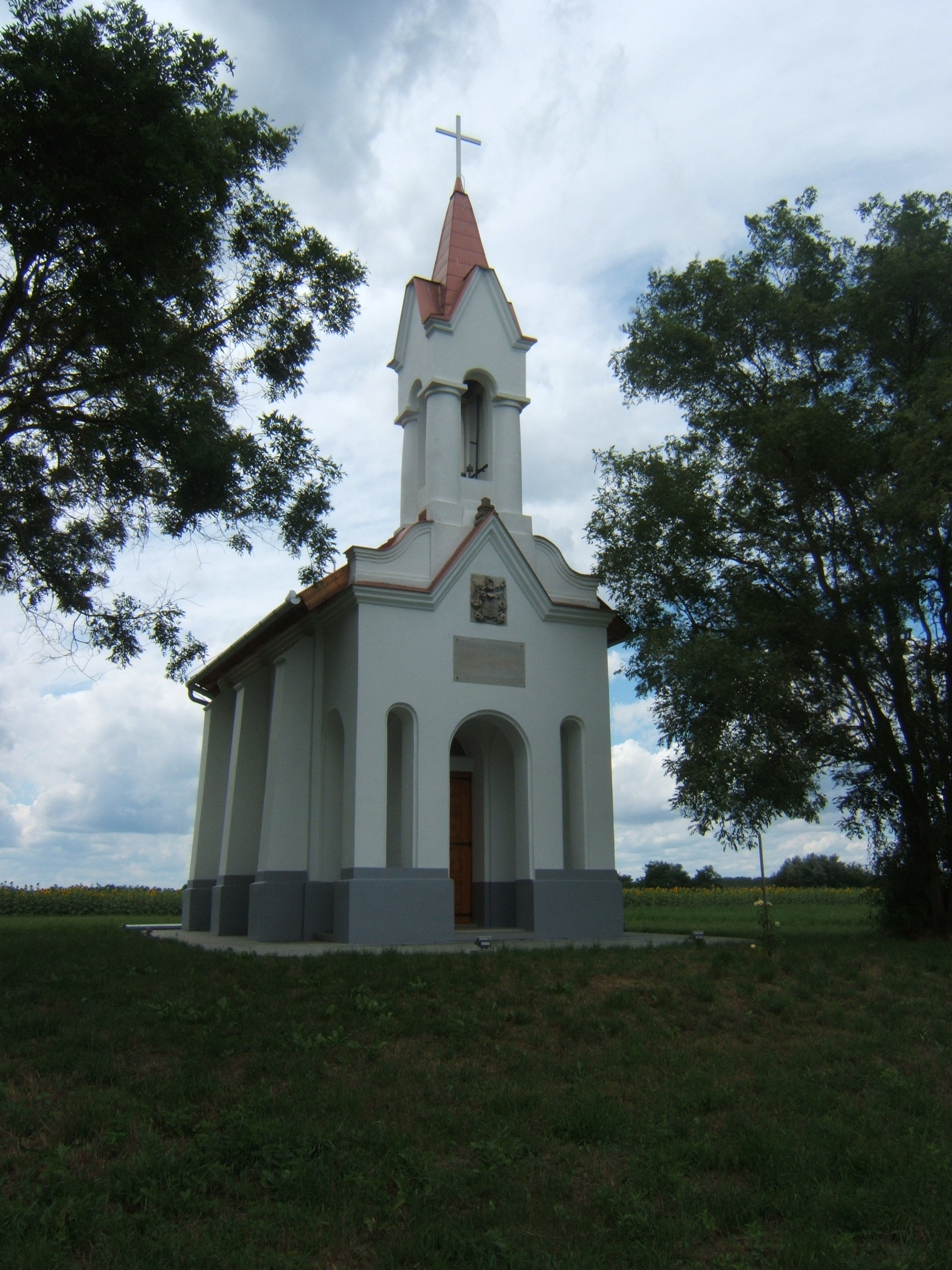
Kapotsfy Chapel in Kiskorpád

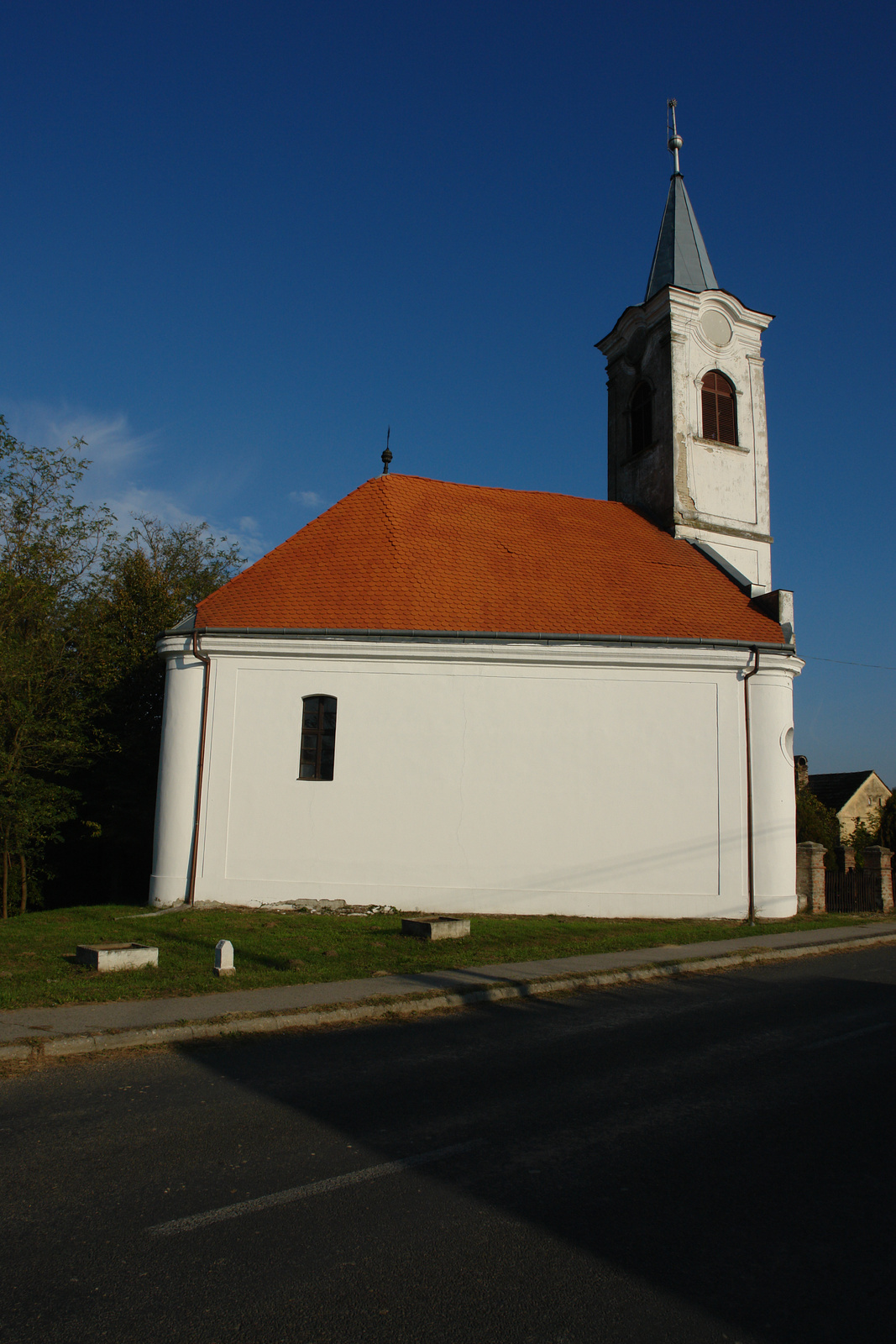
Reformed Church in Kiskorpád

== Literature ==
- László Szita : Somogy megyei nemzetiségek településtörténete a XVIII-XIX. században – Somogyi Almanach 52. (Kaposvár, 1993)
