= Judith Stolzer-Segall =

- יהודית שטולצר-סגל
- Born: 20 May 1904
- Died: 12 January 1990 (aged 85); Munich
- Education: Technische Hochschule Danzig

Judith Stolzer-Segall (Hebrew: יהודית שטולצר-סגל; 1904–1990) was a German Jewish modern architect. She is believed to be the first female architect to ever design and build a synagogue.

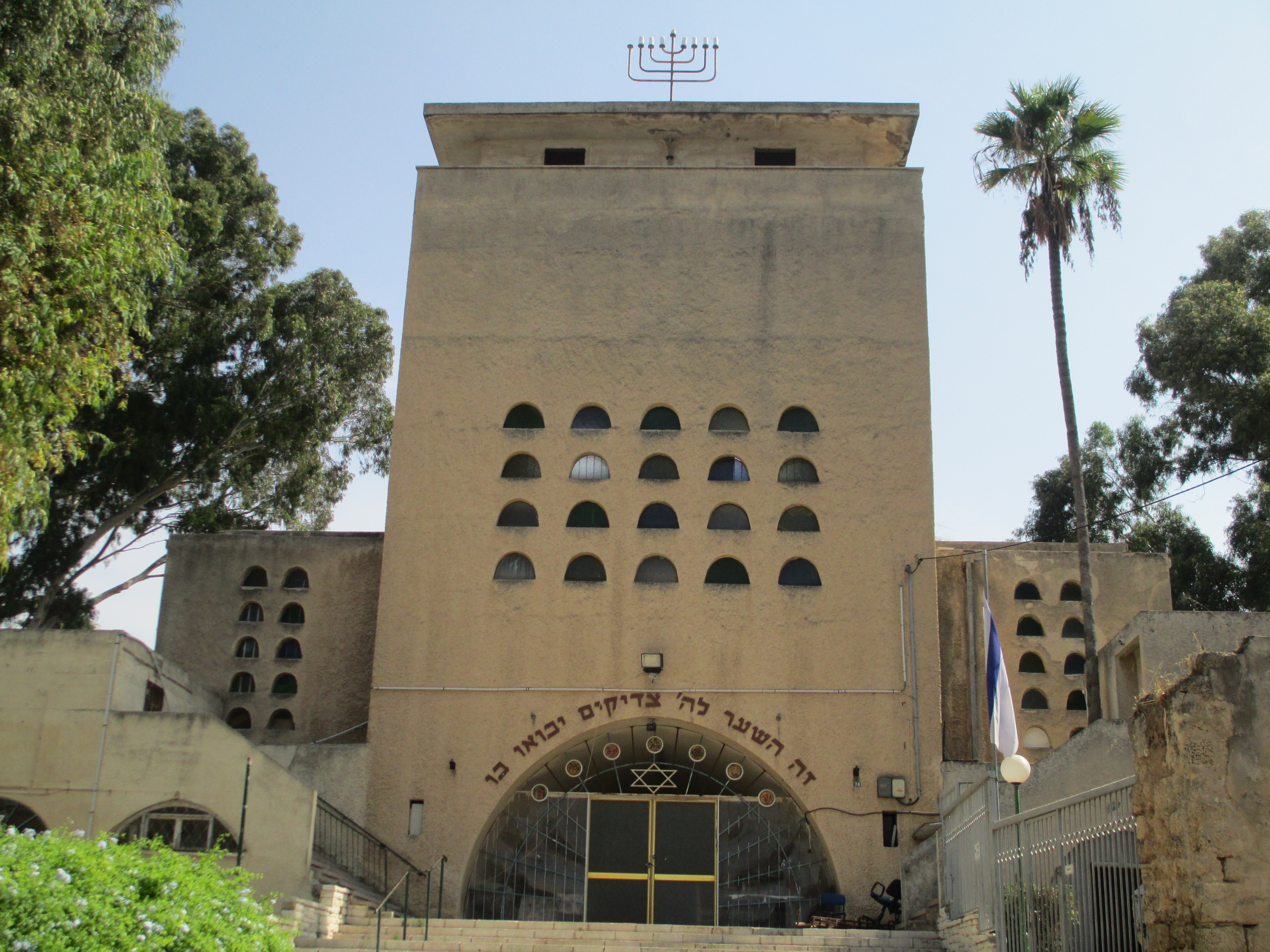
Central Synagogue of Hadera (1935)

== Life ==
Judith Stolzer-Segall was born in the Russian Empire on 20 May 1904. She grew up in Berlin following the expulsion of Jews from Lithuania in 1914.

In 1924, Stolzer-Segall matriculated at the Technische Hochschule Danzig where she studied architecture until 1929. Following her graduation, she was employed at various offices, eventually going on to found her own office in 1932.

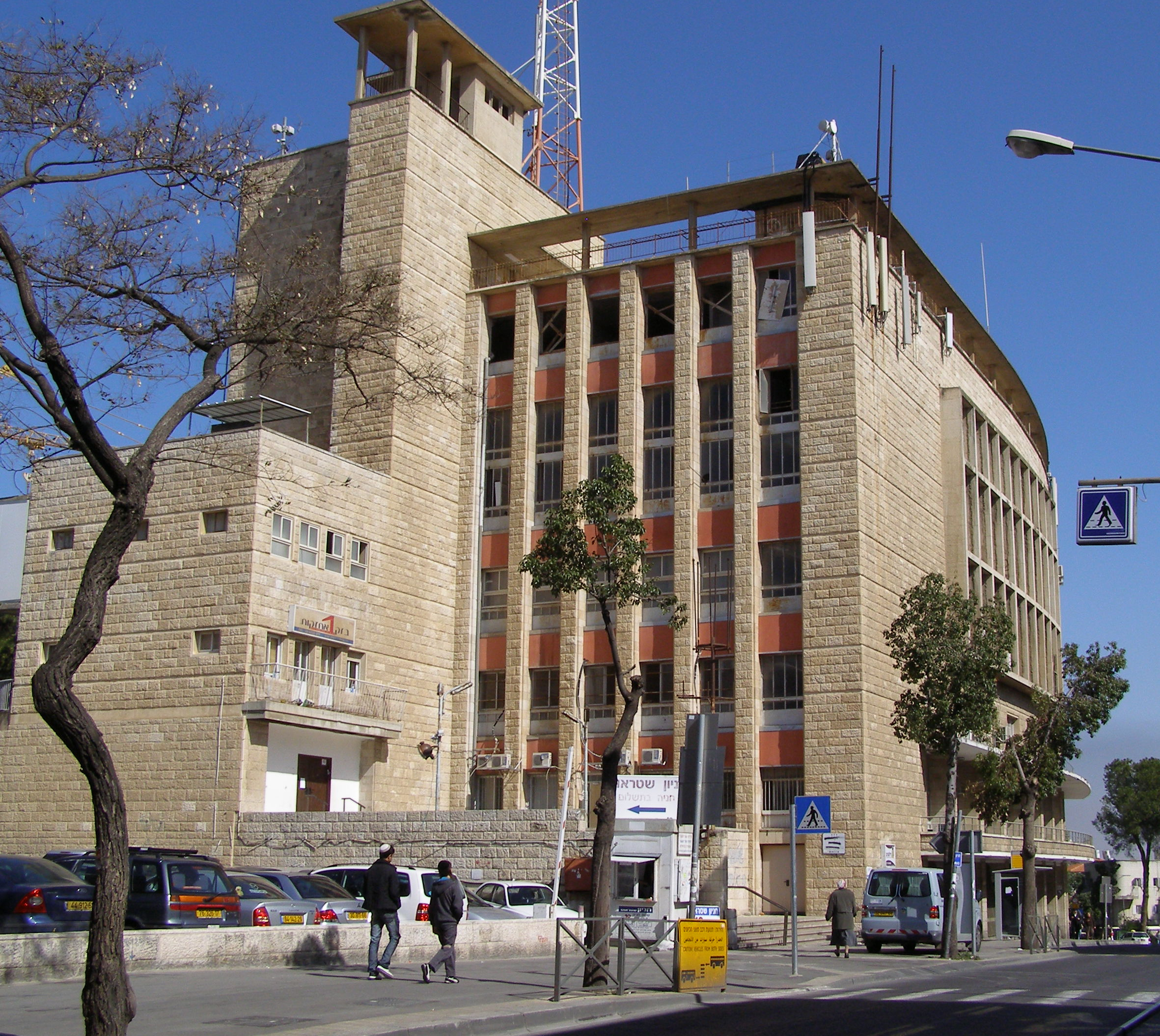
Histadrut building in Jerusalem (1950)

In 1933, Stolzer-Segall immigrated to Mandatory Palestine. In Palestine, she worked with a number of other Jewish architects including Oskar Kaufmann and Eugen Stolzer. During this period, Stolzer-Segall won the commission for the design of the Central Synagogue of Hadera; the building is believed to be the first synagogue designed by a woman.

Stolzer-Segall returned to Germany in 1957, going on to become a citizen of the country in 1968.

Judith Stolzer-Segall died on 12 January 1990 in Munich, Germany.

== Work ==
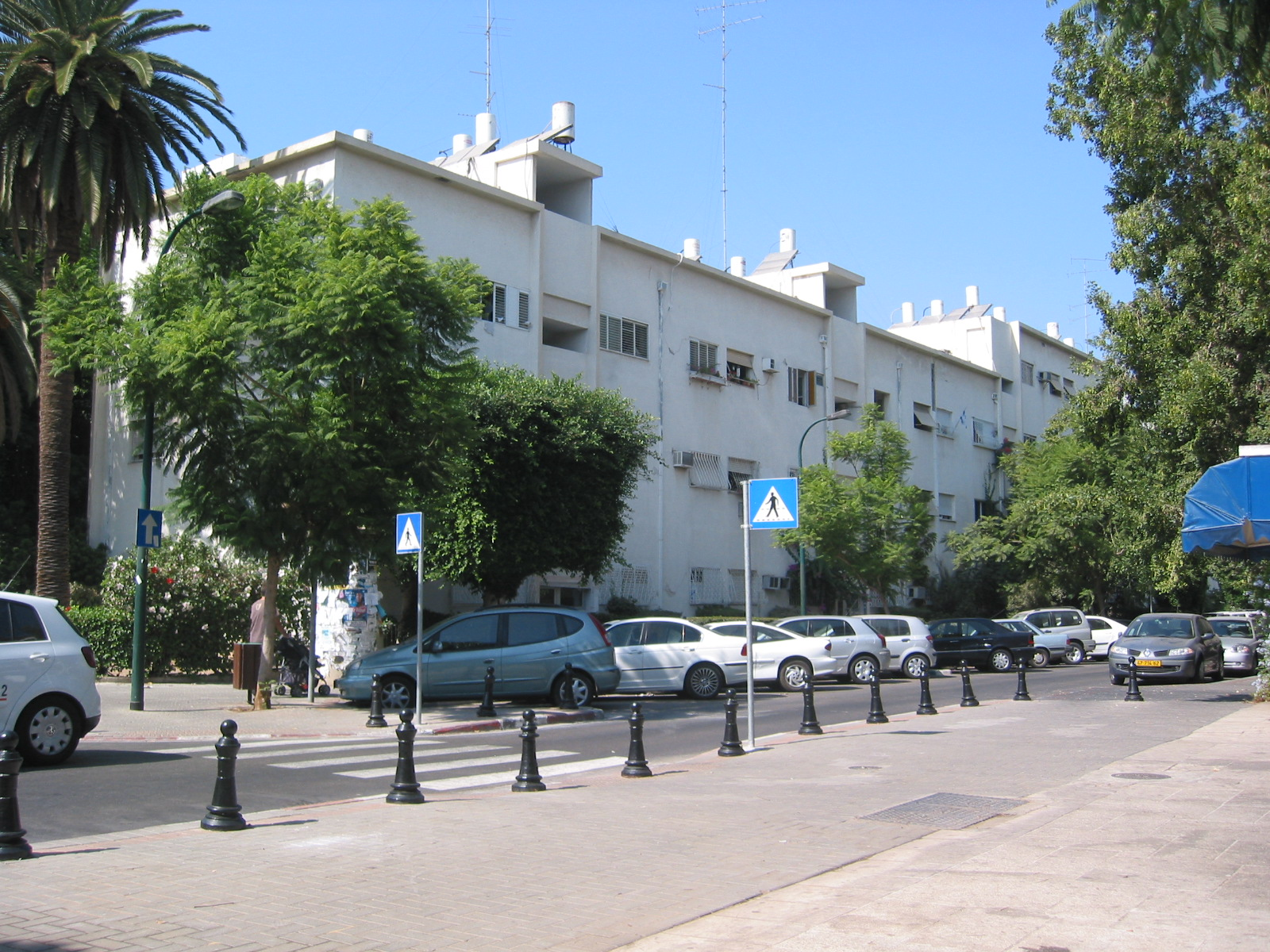
Kiryat Meir, Tel Aviv

- Central Synagogue of Hadera (Hebrew: בית הכנסת הגדול, 1935) Hadera
- Kiryat Meir (Hebrew: קריית מאיר, 1936), Tel Aviv
- Histadrut building (Hebrew: בית ההסתדרות, 1950), Jerusalem
