= Marie Frommer =

German architect

- Born: March 17, 1890; Warsaw
- Died: November 16, 1976 (aged 86); New York City, U.S.
- Education: Technische Hochschule Berlin, Dresden Technical University
- Occupation: Architect
- Known for: Expressionist and Neue Sachlichkeit architecture

Marie Frommer (March 17, 1890, Warsaw – November 16, 1976, New York), was a Polish-born German architect. Her work reflected the principles of Expressionism and the Neue Sachlichkeit (The New Objectivity), emphasizing colour and experimenting with light and form.

== Biography and career ==
Marie Frommer came from a Jewish family. In 1912 she enrolled as an architecture student and was one of the first women to study at the Technische Hochschule in Berlin (now Technische Universität Berlin) graduating in 1913. Having received a conservative grounding in architecture, she continued her studies at the Dresden Technical University, where she focused on town planning, especially the role of rivers and canals in the planning and composition of cities. She studied under Professor Cornelius Gurlitt. In 1919 she completed her studies and returned to Berlin, where she opened her own studio in 1926. She also wrote articles on architectural design for magazines. In 1936 she fled Nazi Germany for London, eventually emigrating to America in 1940. She settled in New York, working as an architect for New York State until 1946.

== Architectural work ==
- 1920s – Leiser Silk Shop, Berlin
- 1920s – Villa Fränkel, Berlin-Dahlem
- 1920s – Shoe store Greco, Paris-Deaiville
- 1929 – Hotel Villa Majestic, Berlin-Wilmersdorf
- 1930 – Department store Textilia (later Ostravica), Moravian Ostrava (Czech Republic)
- Library Law Offices Mansbach & Paley, New York
