= Isaak Shvartsev =

- Born: Isaak; 1949 (age 76–77); Chișinău
- Citizenship: Soviet Union
- Education: Technical University of Moldova
- Occupation: Architect

Isaak Sergivich Shvartsev (Russian: Исаак Сергеевич Шварцев; born 1949) is a Moldavian Soviet architect, known for his work in Chișinău. In 1970 he graduated from the Chișinău Construction College, and then Chișinău Polytechnic Institute five years later. In the 1980s he designed much of the shopping centre and residential quarter in Salgannoy, Chișinău. He was also the architect of the animated film studio in Chișinău, the Educational Laboratory Complex, and a cinema in Plovdiv, Bulgaria (1986). In 1976 he won the award of the National competition of architects to design the memorial complex, commemorating the 30th anniversary of the Second Jassy–Kishinev Offensive. He later moved to the United States, where he resides in New York City.
