= Synagogue Don Isaac Abravanel =

Synagogue located in Paris, France

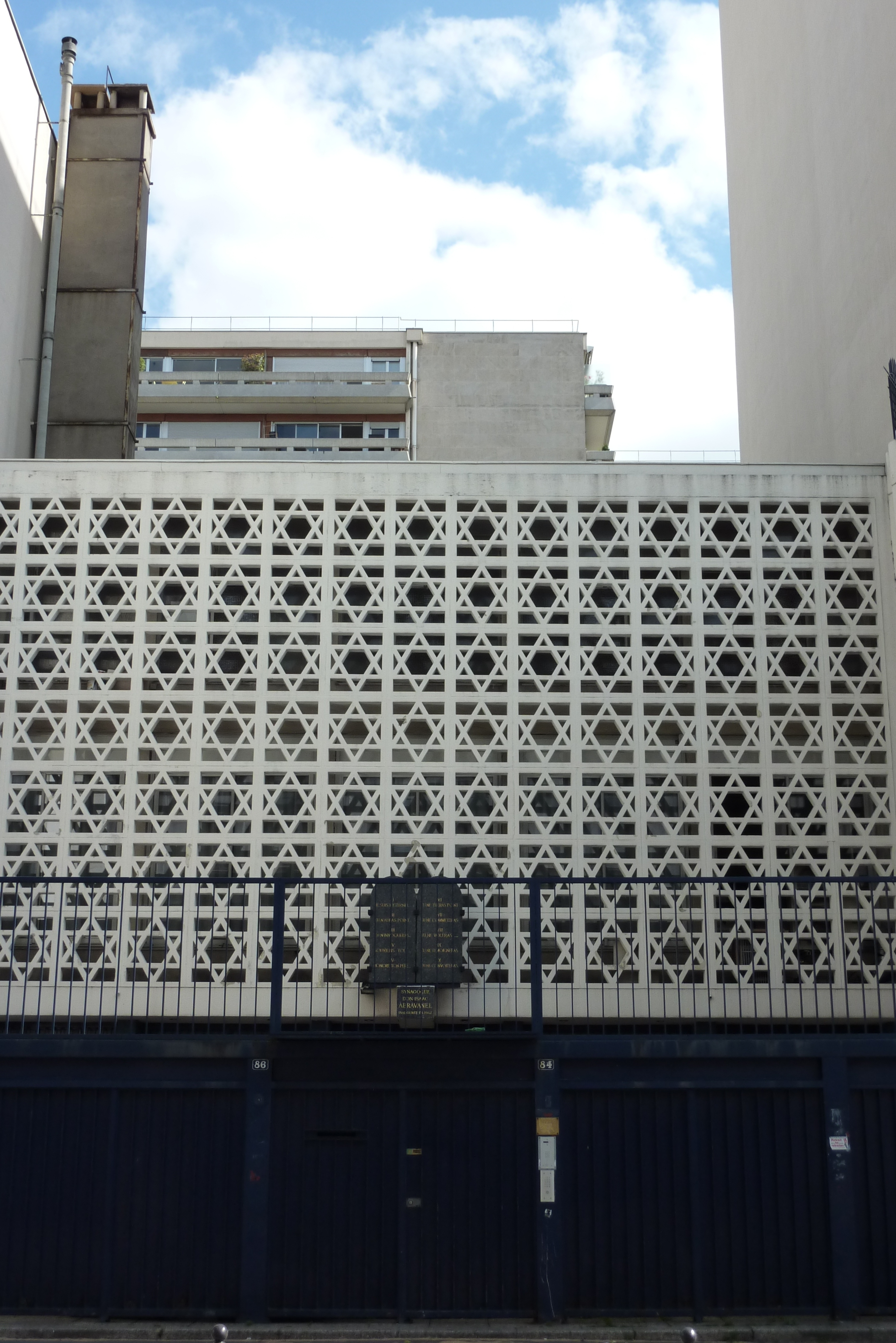
- The synagogue façade in 2010

- Location of the synagogue in Paris

Religion
- Affiliation: Orthodox Judaism
- Rite: Nusach Edot HaMizrach
- Ecclesiastical or organisational status: Synagogue
- Leadership: Rabbi Elie Ebidia
- Status: Active

Location
- Location: 84-86 rue de la Roquette, XIe arrondissement, Paris
- Country: France
- Coordinates: 48°51′22″N 2°22′35″E

Architecture
- Architects: Alexandre Persitz; Arthur-Georges Héaume
- Type: Synagogue architecture
- Style: Modernist
- Established: c. 1900 (as a congregation)
- Completed: 1962

Website
- synagogue-laroquette.fr (in French)

The Synagogue Don Isaac Abravanel, also known as the Synagogue de la Roquette, is an Orthodox Jewish congregation and synagogue, located in the XIe arrondissement of Paris, France. Designed by architects Alexandre Persitz and Arthur-Georges Héaume in the Modernist style, the synagogue was built in 1962 for Jews who emigrated to France from Algeria, Morocco and Tunisia as a result of decolonization. The congregation worships in the Sephardi rite.

== History ==
=== Establishment of the congregation ===
At the beginning of the 20th century, a number of Jews, principally from Turkey and Salonica with a small minority from Egypt, began settling in the neighborhood of la Roquette, principally around rue Popincourt and rue Sedaine. An oratory was founded in 1909, in the backroom of the cafe "Le Bosphore" on rue Sedaine, where the service took place in both Hebrew and Ladino. When the room became too cramped following further influx of new immigrants, the community built the Al Syete (the Seven) synagogue in 1913 at 7 rue Popincourt, on the site of a former cinema. The synagogue operated at this location until the 1960s.

In the neighborhood, the Jews specialized in the wholesale trade of linens (household linens and table linens). When the First World War broke out, many of the congregants decided to join the French Army. In June 1935 a monument was built at 84-86 rue de la Roquette to commemorate the Jewish volunteers who died for France in the war. The monument was inaugurated by French President Albert Lebrun.

Despite their enlistment in the French Army during the Great War, many Ottoman Jews were delivered to the Nazis by the Vichy regime during the Second World War. Several hundred families from the congregation were rounded up and died in the extermination camps.

=== Current synagogue ===
Following the Liberation of Paris, the Sephardic Cult Association of Paris, which already owned land on rue de la Roquette, decided to raise the funds necessary to construct a new synagogue at the place where the previous monument was erected (84-86 rue de la Roquette). The new synagogue was named in honour of Isaac Abravanel, a philosopher and biblical commentator. The Ten Commandments are inscribed in French on the façade of the synagogue.

In 2014, the synagogue was subject to an antisemitic attack.

== See also ==
- History of the Jews in France
- List of synagogues in France
