= Erez Ella =

Israeli architect

Erez Ella ארז אלה
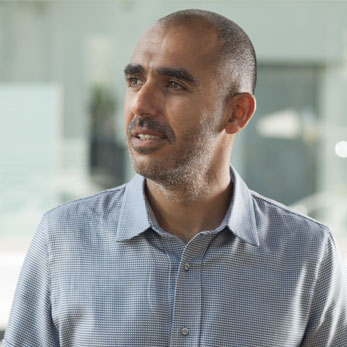
- Born: 1971 (age 54–55)
- Occupation: Architect
- Practice: OMA, REX, HQ
- Buildings: Museum Plaza, TVCC

Erez Ella (Hebrew: ארז אלה), is an Israeli architect.

== Biography ==
Erez Ella studied architecture at Tel Aviv University. He is the founder of HQ Architects in Tel Aviv, an office that practices research, urban planning, and design of housing and public buildings as well as commercial buildings. Prior to establishing HQ, Ella spent several years as a contributor and associate at two architectural firms, OMA and REX. At REX he co-led projects such as the Museum Plaza in Louisville, Vakko HQ and others. At OMA he served as a Project Architect for the Television Cultural Center for China Central Television (TVCC) in Beijing and the Whitney Museum of American Art in New York. He was the Eero Saarinen Professor at the Yale School of Architecture and heads the sustainable design unit at the Bezalel Academy of Art and Design in Jerusalem. He is the editor of the publication Aircraft Carrier (Hajte Cantz, 2012) and co-curated the Israeli pavilion at the 13th Venice Architecture Biennale. After the biennale, the exhibition - Air Carrier, was presented in New York at Storefront for Art and Architecture (2013), and at The Israel Museum, Jerusalem.
