= Alexandre Persitz =

- Born: 4 June 1910; Moscow, Russia
- Died: 15 July 1975 (aged 65); Paris, France
- Occupation: Architect

Alexandre Persitz (4 June 1910 – 15 July 1975) was a Russian-born French Modernist architect.

== Early life ==
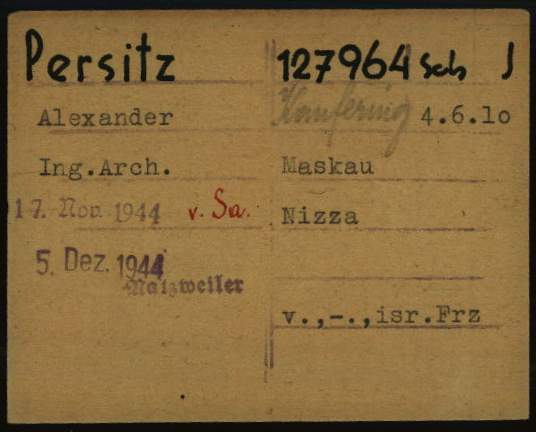
Registration card of Alexandre Persitz as a prisoner at Dachau Nazi Concentration Camp

Alexandre Persitz was born in 1910 in Moscow, Russian Empire. He emigrated to France as a child. During World War II, he was sent to concentration camps by the Nazi invaders. He survived The Holocaust.

== Career ==
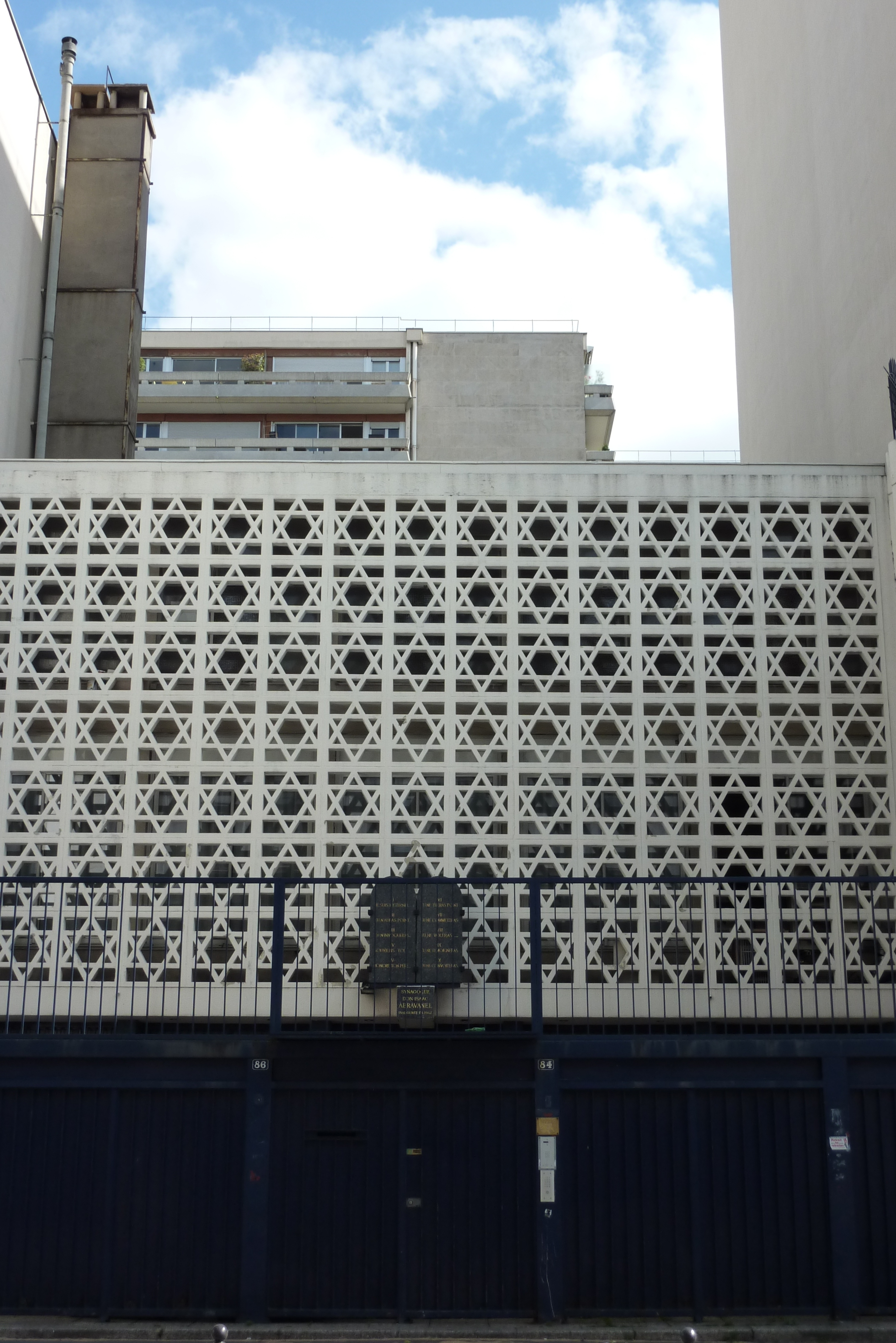
The Synagogue Don Isaac Abravanel in Paris.

Persitz began his career as an architect by redesigning the port of Le Havre with Auguste Perret shortly after World War II. In 1953–1956, he designed the Memorial to the Unknown Jewish Martyr on Rue Geoffroy-l'Asnier in the 4th arrondissement of Paris with Georges Goldberg.

With Arthur-Georges Héaume, Persitz designed the Synagogue Don Isaac Abravanel, also known as the Synagogue de la Roquette, in the 11th arrondissement of Paris in 1962. In 1964, they designed a skyscraper at 38-40 Rue des Épinettes in the 17th arrondissement of Paris. In 1968, they designed two skyscrapers in the 14th arrondissement of Paris: the Le Méridien de Paris at 24-34 Rue Dareau and another building at 29 Rue de la Tombe Issoire. In 1973, he designed Tour Nova, a skyscraper in La Garenne-Colombes.

Persitz designed several skyscrapers in Puteaux with Héaume, Bernard Zehrfuss, and J. Merski: the Tour Diamant, Tour Emeraude, and the Résidences Bellerive.

Persitz was the editor-in-chief of L'Architecture d'aujourd'hui, a French magazine about architecture, from 1949 to 1965.

== Death ==
Persitz died in 1975.
