= Susan Kozma-Orlay =

Hungarian–Australian architect and designer (1913–2008)

- Kozma-Orlay, c. 1930s
- Born: 1913; Hungary
- Died: 2008 (aged 94–95); Australia
- Alma mater: Kunstgewerbeschule
- Occupation: Architect, designer, furniture designer
- Parent(s): Lajos Kozma

Susan Kozma-Orlay (born Zsuzsa Kozma; 1913–2008) was a Hungarian-Australian mid-century modernist designer.

== Biography ==
Zsuzsa Kozma was born in Budapest, Hungary in 1913. Her father was the architect and critic Kozma Lajos.

She attended the Kunstgewerbeschule (School of Applied Arts) in both Stuttgart and Vienna, where she studied furniture design and graphic design. She then worked in her father's Vienna architecture studio until his activity was curtailed by anti-Jewish restrictions. After the war, in the late 1940s, she married and emigrated to Australia (where she Anglicised her name to Susan Orlay).

Her career in Australia spanned textile design, illustration, store displays and graphics for the department store David Jones, furniture design, and interior design.

Her work was exhibited in the exhibition The Moderns: European Designers in Sydney at the Museum of Sydney in 2017, and is held in the collection of the Victoria & Albert Museum in London.

== Publications ==
- Hawcroft, Rebecca (2017). "From the Margins to the Mainstream". The Other Moderns: Sydney's Forgotten European Design Legacy. Sydney: University of New South Wales Press. pp. 165–190. ISBN 978-1742235561.
- Shapira, Elana (2021). Designing Transformation: Jews and Cultural Identity in Central European Modernism. Bloomsbury Publishing. pp. 150–152. ISBN 978-1350172296.
