= Strataca =

Salt mine museum in Hutchinson, Kansas

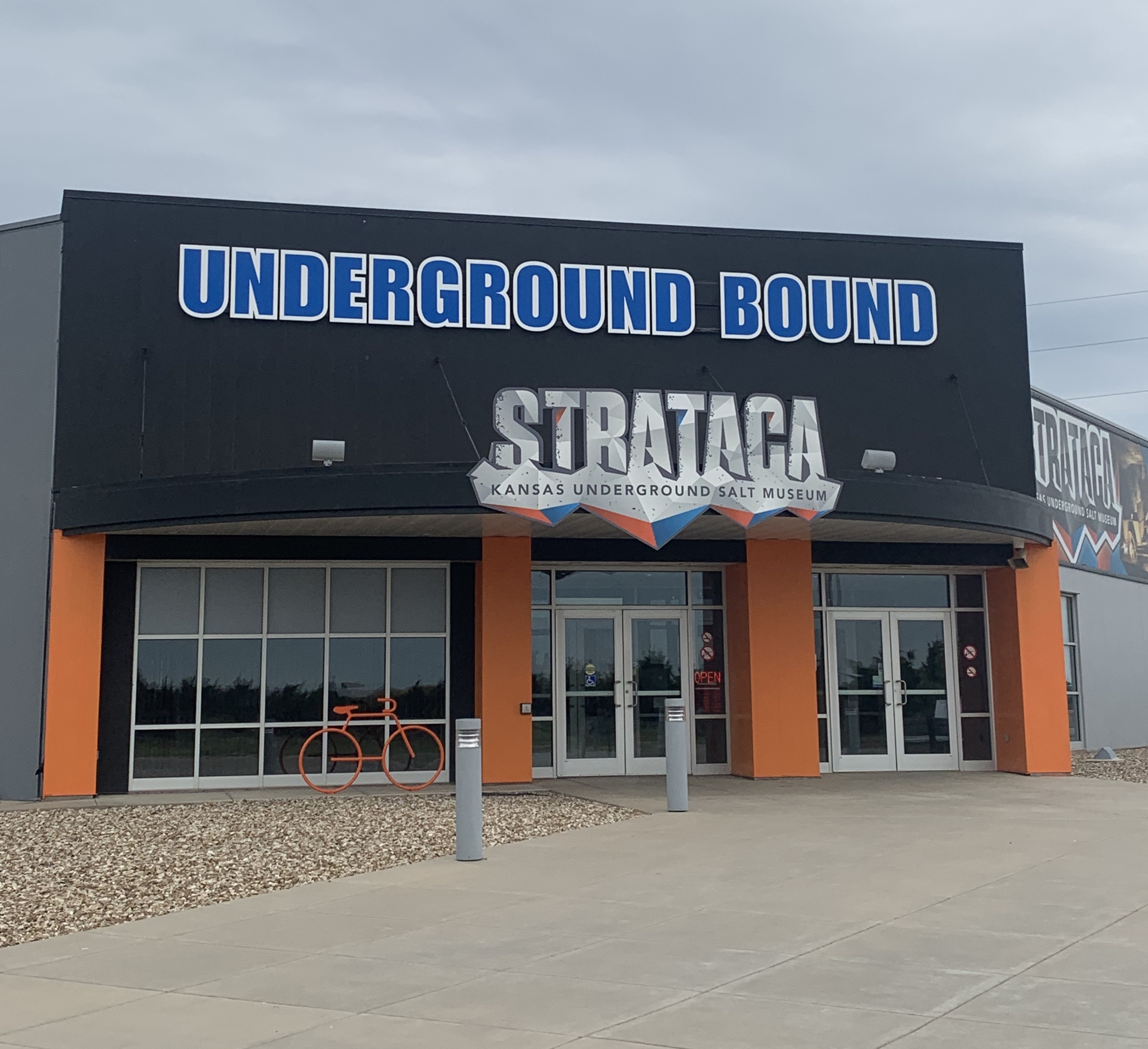
- Main Entrance (2022)

- Location within Kansas Location within the United States
- Former name: Kansas Underground Salt Museum
- Established: May 1, 2007; 19 years ago
- Location: 3650 East Avenue G, Hutchinson, KS 67501 USA
- Coordinates: 38°02′37″N 97°52′03″W
- Type: Salt mine
- Website: underkansas.org

Strataca is a salt mine museum in Hutchinson, Kansas, United States, located on the northwest corner of Yoder Road and Avenue G. It was previously known as the Kansas Underground Salt Museum. The museum is built within one of the world's largest deposits of rock salt, formed 275 million years ago, and provides the opportunity to go 650 feet (200 m) beneath the Earth’s surface. The museum is located in the Hutchinson Salt Company mine which began operation in 1923 as Carey Salt Company. There are 14 other salt mines in the United States, but Strataca is the only one accessible to tourists.

== History ==
=== Salt mining industry ===
A vast expanse underground, the Hutchinson Salt Company mine covers about 980 acres (4.0 km^{2}); if one were to consecutively line up each excavated area, the chamber would stretch for 150 miles (240 km). Natural pillars of solid rock salt 40 feet (12 m) square are left intact to support each corridor or “room”.

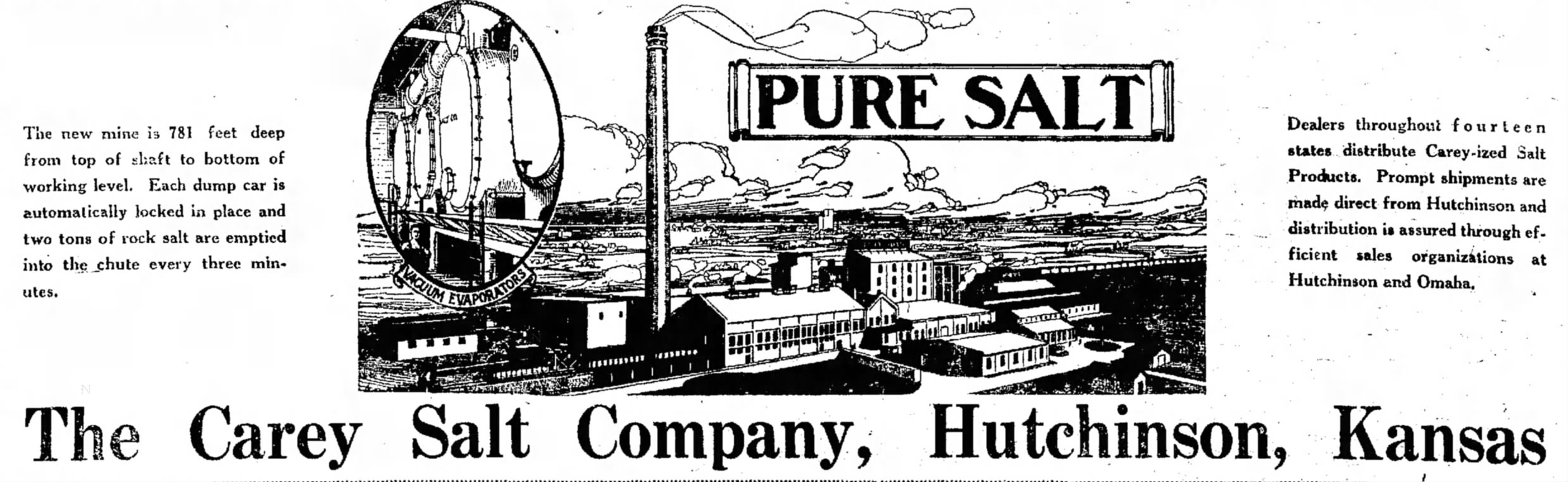
Opening of salt mine in The Hutchinson News

Since 1923, Hutchinson Salt Company (formerly Carey Salt) has produced rock salt by the room and pillar mining fashion, which begins with a shaft sunk through the overlying rock to the salt deposit. The salt is removed in a checkerboard pattern, in which large square caverns alternate with square pillars of salt that serve as support for the rock above. This pattern of mining also provides fresh, ventilated air in worker-occupied areas.

Blasting breaks the salt into manageable pieces, which are conveyed to crushers and removed to the surface through the shaft with large buckets on the hoist. The mine elevator is called the “skip” in the mining industry. Fully loaded it carries four tons of salt and makes a round trip every three minutes. This loaded skip is hoisted to the top electrically by a wire rope with jute core, and is used to transport miners to and from the mine as well as bring the mined salt topside. Because of the impurities (mostly shale and anhydrite), rock salt is used primarily as road salt, or used to feed livestock.

Another form of mining, solution mining or the evaporation process, is performed at Cargill Salt and Morton Salt, both located in Reno County. Water is forced down a pipe into the salt deposit where it dissolves into brine which is pumped to the surface and heated to the point of evaporation, leaving behind a high grade of salt. In contrast, salt produced through the evaporation process produces common table salt, as well as salt used by pharmaceutical companies, food processors, and agricultural and chemical businesses.

Museum visitors ride on electric trams driven by docents for The Dark Ride segment of the visit underground. Miners have a different form of transportation—vehicles that run on bio-diesel fuel, or B100, a fuel that is almost 100% cooking oil. After the rail system was discontinued, miners switched to an alternative way to get around the mine—old junk cars. Initially, these cars were modified to run on diesel, but have been updated to use bio-diesel because it does not leave particles in the air. The Hutchinson Salt Company mine was the first mine in North America to convert underground vehicles to B100 fuel.

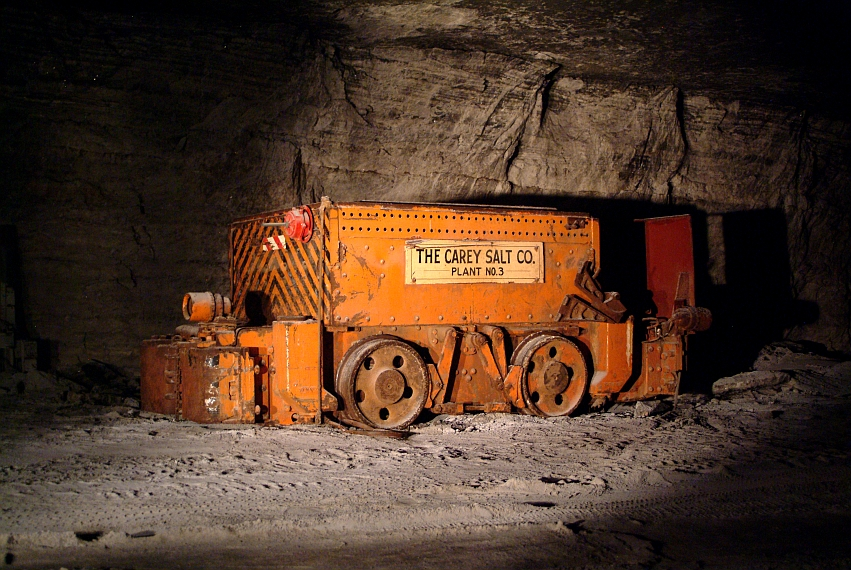
A salt car from the Carey Salt Company (now the Hutchinson Salt Company)

=== Reno County Historical Society ===
The Reno County Historical Society was organized by thirteen interested citizens in 1960, and received its charter from the Kansas Historical Society in 1961. The society did not have a permanent home for a museum until 1963, when it opened in five rooms in the downstairs area of a home belonging to RCHS founder and then president, Goldie Maupin. Mrs. Maupin lived in the home originally built by one of the former mayors of Hutchinson, J.P. Harsha, for whom the large drainage canal on the outskirts of the city was named. By 1967, the society's collections outgrew the Harsha House and the Reno County Historical Museum was moved to nearby Haven, Kansas, a smaller community located 13 miles (21 km) southeast of Hutchinson.

In Haven, the museum thrived for the first few years. Community leaders believed the museum would provide an anchor for downtown growth and the development of tourism in Haven. Efforts to gain a tax base for support from the Reno County mill levy for the museum were unsuccessful, however. The museum's home in historic Township Hall also began to deteriorate during the early 1970s. The roof began to leak and the basement periodically flooded. Collections storage areas also filled to capacity and the museum was forced to stop collecting artifacts in 1976. By that time, the collection had grown to approximately 10,000 artifacts, some of which were lost or ruined due to the poor condition of the building and the lack of environmental control. Community support also ebbed as the condition of the museum facility grew worse. During the early 1980s the museum was only open on Sunday afternoons, and by appointment.

In 1984, the Reno County Historical Society's board of directors began a campaign to bring the museum back to the more heavily populated city of Hutchinson, which is also the county seat of Reno County. The board convened a site selection committee and began a development fund drive that ultimately led to the purchase of the Kline Insurance Building and the Rosemont Hotel. Part of the funds were used to construct a link between the adjacent buildings and to establish the Borton Memorial Garden near the entrance to the museum. The first professional director and curator were hired in 1985, and the museum opened its doors on December 12, 1986, at its present location. In 1989, the museum began publishing ‘’Legacy: The Journal of the Reno County Historical Society’’.

In 1996 and 1997, the museum redesigned its public space to include five exhibit galleries, two children's interactive areas, a research room, and the Houston Whiteside Conference Room, named for one of the society's benefactors. In 1996, the museum developed the Celebrate History educational program for elementary school students, which annually hosts over 1200 students from the Reno County area. In 1997, the Kansas Department of Transportation granted the museum's request to relocate the 1876 John Siegrist claim House to museum grounds, thus saving the structure from demolition. The Claim House opened to the public in September 1998.

In 1998 and again in 2000, the RCHS received the prestigious General Operating Support grant from the Institute of Museum and Library Services in Washington D.C. In 1998 the RCHS began a long range planning process that resulted in the idea of creating a major exhibition about the salt industry in Reno County. That idea grew to become the Kansas Underground Salt Museum.

=== Construction ===
Beginning in 1923, miners and visitors went underground in groups no larger than ten, as that was the maximum capacity of the singular elevator. The ride often sprinkled salt on riders. The shaft never took up a load of salt while carrying miners. In fact, when the elevator transported people, salt production below had to stop. For this reason, the visionaries of the salt museum knew a project could not get underway without construction of a new shaft. In cooperation with Underground Vaults & Storage, the storage company located in the mine, the two entities agreed to share the cost of the shaft, making the Kansas Underground Salt Museum a viable reality. The shaft had to be drilled through one of the world's largest aquifers. The Miocene-Pliocene Ogallala Aquifer covers around 174,000 square miles (450,000 km^{2}) in eight states and can be as deep as 1,000 feet (300 m). In this area, a Pleistocene aquifer known as the Equus Beds extends from the Ogallala and is about 130 feet (40 m) thick at the site of the museum. For efficient construction without water seepage, the aquifer was frozen. That allowed miners to dig through the aquifer and encase the shaft in concrete. Shaft construction was handled by Thyssen Mining Company, a Canadian contractor. The project got underway March 8, 2004, and took just a day shy of one year to complete. Thyssen utilized the expertise of Moretrench American Corporation for the ground freezing. The process required the sinking of 24 separate pipes to a depth of 150 feet (46 m). A liquid nitrogen and salt brine solution pumped into the pipes brought the temperature down to freeze the aquifer. Once the frozen condition was accomplished, excavation began using a crane and bucket methods. The mining cycle consisted of drilling in six-to eight-foot increments, loading the area with explosives, blasting, then “mucking out” (removing) the blasted material from the shaft. The miners would then advance 15 feet (4.6 m) and pour the shaft's concrete liner. This action was performed with every 15-foot (4.6 m) advancement. On December 22, 2004, the shaft sinking was completed. Finish work on the shaft continued until March 7, 2005.

=== Name ===
On June 4, 2013, the museum changed its name from Kansas Underground Salt Museum to Strataca.

== Museum ==
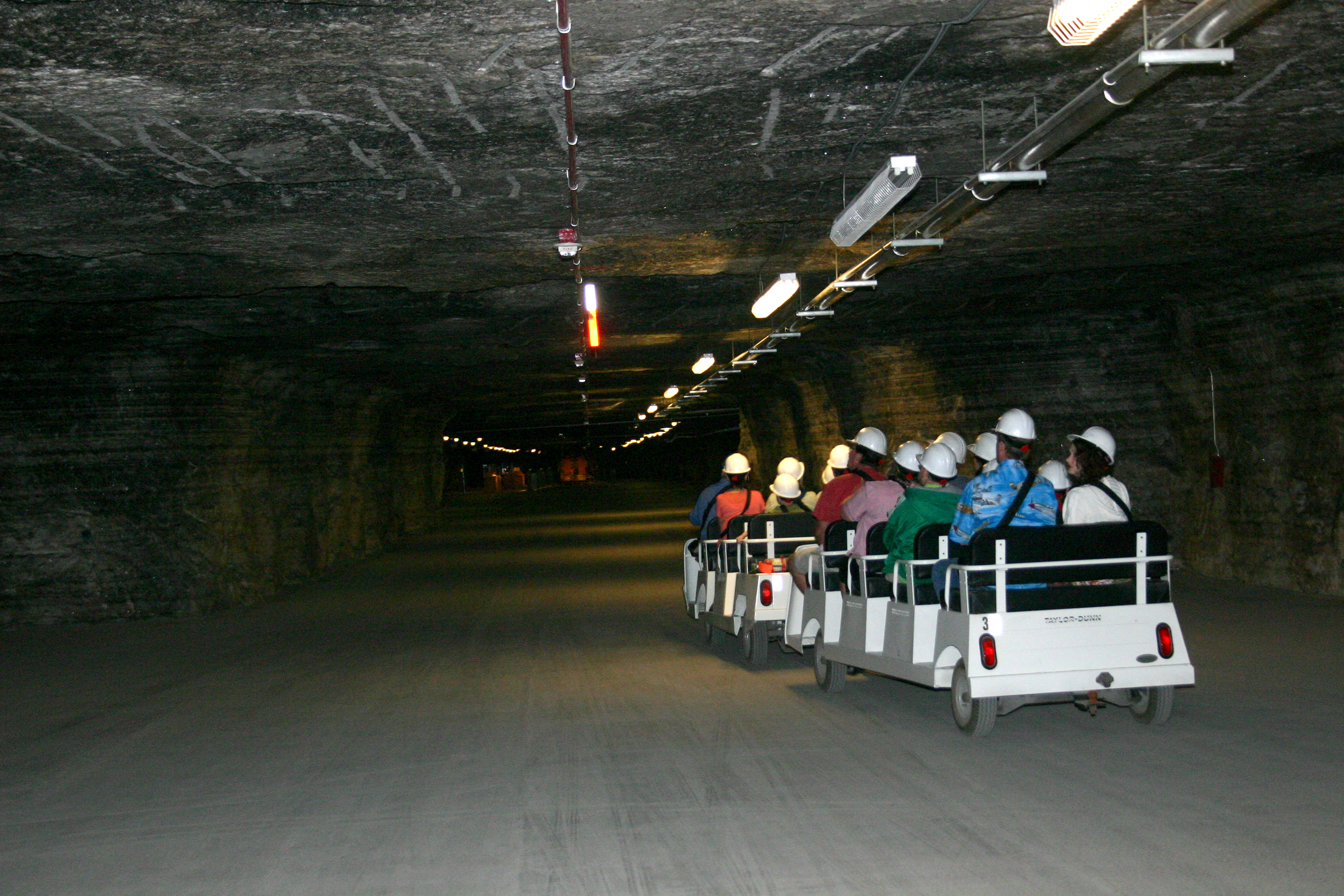
Tram Ride in the Great Hall

It’s a 90-second trip to the museum 650 feet (200 m) below the Kansas prairie. Visitors ride in a double-deck elevator that holds fifteen people on each level.

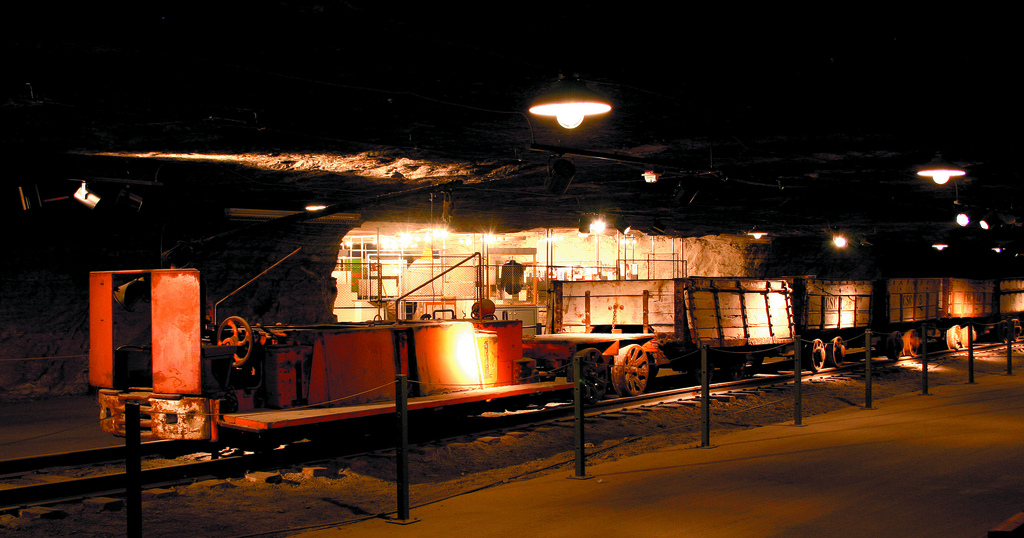
A train that was used to transport salt, miners and supplies

Conditions underground are very predictable and constant. The mine naturally maintains a temperature of 68 degrees with a relative humidity of around 45%. The mine chambers are very large, ranging in size from 2,500 to 15,000 square feet (1,400 m^{2}) with ceiling heights ranging from 11 to 17 feet (5.2 m). Since 1954, anyone going into the mine has been required to wear a hard hat and rescue breather., but using the breather has never been necessary to use by any visitor or employee. The Mine Safety and Health Administration, which regularly inspects all aspects of the operation, considers the Hutchinson mine one of the safest in the world.

The material used for much of the museum flooring is very similar to concrete; but instead of sand, salt is used with the cement and water. Thus, it is known as Saltcrete. Saltcrete does leach – emitting a fine dust of salt – until it is cured, which takes approximately one year. It has limited applications because water makes Saltcrete blister and disintegrate.

== Galleries and exhibits ==
=== Dark Ride ===
A tram tour, the Dark Ride, is an optional opportunity that takes visitors through a maze of chambers beyond the museum area to see various features of the mine environment, with a brief pause to experience the sensation of complete darkness. The tour also includes a stop at a salt pile for a souvenir: filling a sample bag with salt crystals.

=== Mantrip Gallery ===
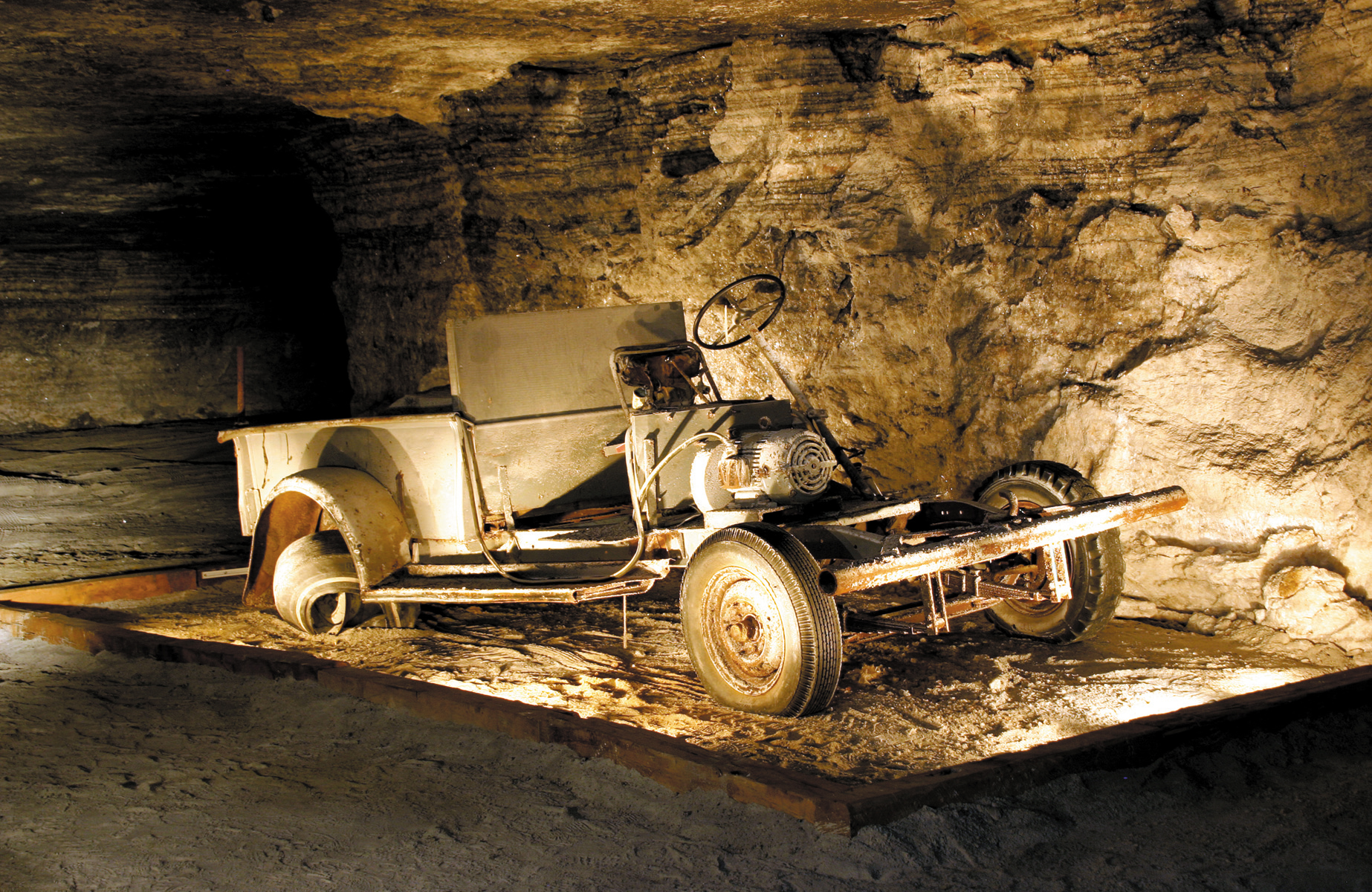
Vehicle used in underground transportation

Mantrips are train-like vehicles. In this gallery, two of the mantrips used to transport miners to and from the mining area are featured. The rail system was used until the 1980s when miners started using vehicles modified for B100 bio-diesel. The vehicles used underground are usually scrap yard cars taken apart to fit on the hoist, then reconfigured underground to drive on bio-diesel, and with extra seats and rollbars added.

=== Mining Gallery ===
Visitors learn about all aspects of the modern-day mining process, as well as earlier procedures, through this three-part gallery. In the Undercut and drill area, the mine is set up for the first phase of a blast. An undercutter is used to cut a slot at the base of the rock, making it possible for the salt to drop. In this phase, a series of carefully sited holes are drilled into the salt wall. The next pillar of the Mining Gallery is the blast area, which illustrates how the room being mined is wired with explosives. On display is a powder car. It was formerly a drill, but was modified underground as a powder car and carried all the tools and materials needed to powder a room, including the explosives and wire. The third phase of the mining process featured is the Load Area. Miners used the Joy Loader on display from the 1940s until 1983, when the rail system was discontinued. Named for its manufacturer, the Joy Loader increased efficiency by eliminating the need to hand-load ore cars. This large piece of equipment, as so many others, was brought down the shaft in pieces and welded back together underground. Once a piece of equipment is underground, it is usually abandoned in an area already mined. The shuttle featured in this gallery was also used from the 1940s until 1983 to take salt from the mine face to the loading station at the main rail line. Powered by a DC extension cord, the car reduced labor and increased efficiency because miners no longer had to lay rails to get the salt from the blast site to the main rail lines.

=== Geology Gallery ===
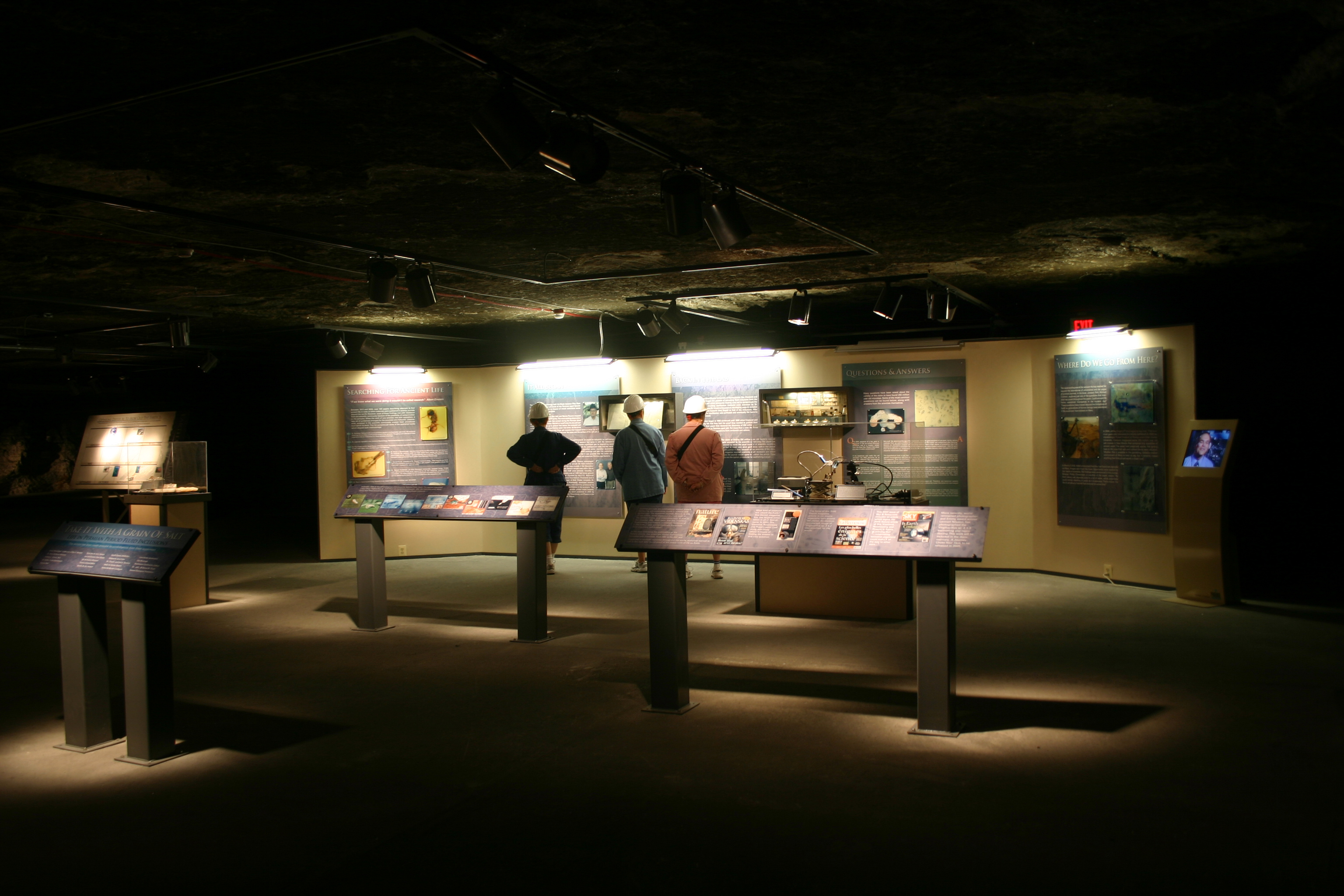
Vreeland Exhibit

Visitors learn the physical and geological characteristics of the salt bed in Kansas. With a focus on the Permian Period (the sixth and last period of the Paleozoic Era), the gallery illustrates the animals that lived during this time and why there are no fossil records in the salt bed. Throughout the mine, water bubbles can be found trapped in some of the salt. These fluid inclusions are believed to have occurred during the Permian Period.

The Fluid Inclusion Exhibit features what is claimed to be the world's oldest living organism, estimated to be about 250 million years old. The supposed discovery of living bacteria found trapped inside a salt crystal is the work of Drs. Russell Vreeland, William Rosenzweig, and Dennis Powers. They claimed that the cells from which those spores presumably formed were alive and active before the time of dinosaurs. (However, their findings date the crystal surrounding the bacteria, and DNA analysis suggests the bacteria themselves are likely to be less ancient.) The three scientists were at the museum for the exhibit opening and collected salt samples from the Hutchinson mine for further research.

=== Underground Vaults & Storage Gallery ===
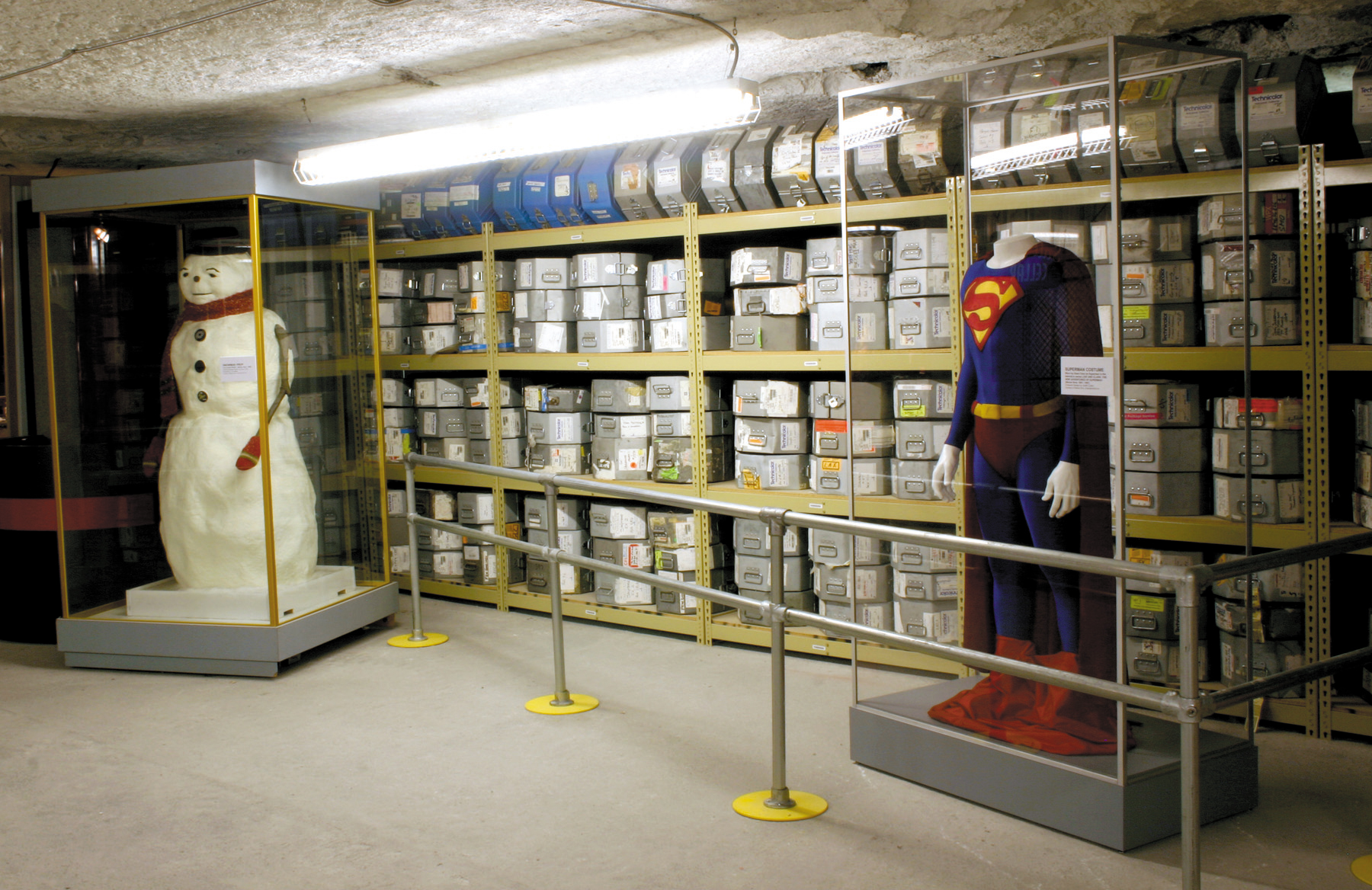
Superman and Jack Frost costumes in the UV&S Exhibit

While the 26-acre facility is a secured site in another area of the Hutchinson Salt Company mine not open to the public, Underground Vaults & Storage (UV&S) has replicated the look and set-up of its operation for the Kansas underground Salt Museum. The company is internationally known for its highly protective, secured storage capabilities, including being home to the original camera negative of many movies, like Gone with the Wind and Ben Hur, as well as television show masters. UV&S also stores medical records, oil and gas charts, and a host of other valuable documents and other materials from all 50 states and many foreign countries.

Underground Vaults and Storage and the Kansas Underground Salt Museum have been loaned several artifacts and actual costumes from popular movies. The temporary exhibit has included such notable memorabilia as Batman and Mr. Freeze costumes from Batman & Robin, James Dean’s shirt from Giant, the Snowman from the 1998 film Jack Frost, and a wax body double of Agent Smith from The Matrix.

== See also ==
- List of museums in Kansas
- Cosmosphere, space museum, in Hutchinson
