= 20 Fenchurch Street =

Skyscraper in London, England

Coordinates: 51°30′41″N 0°05′01″W

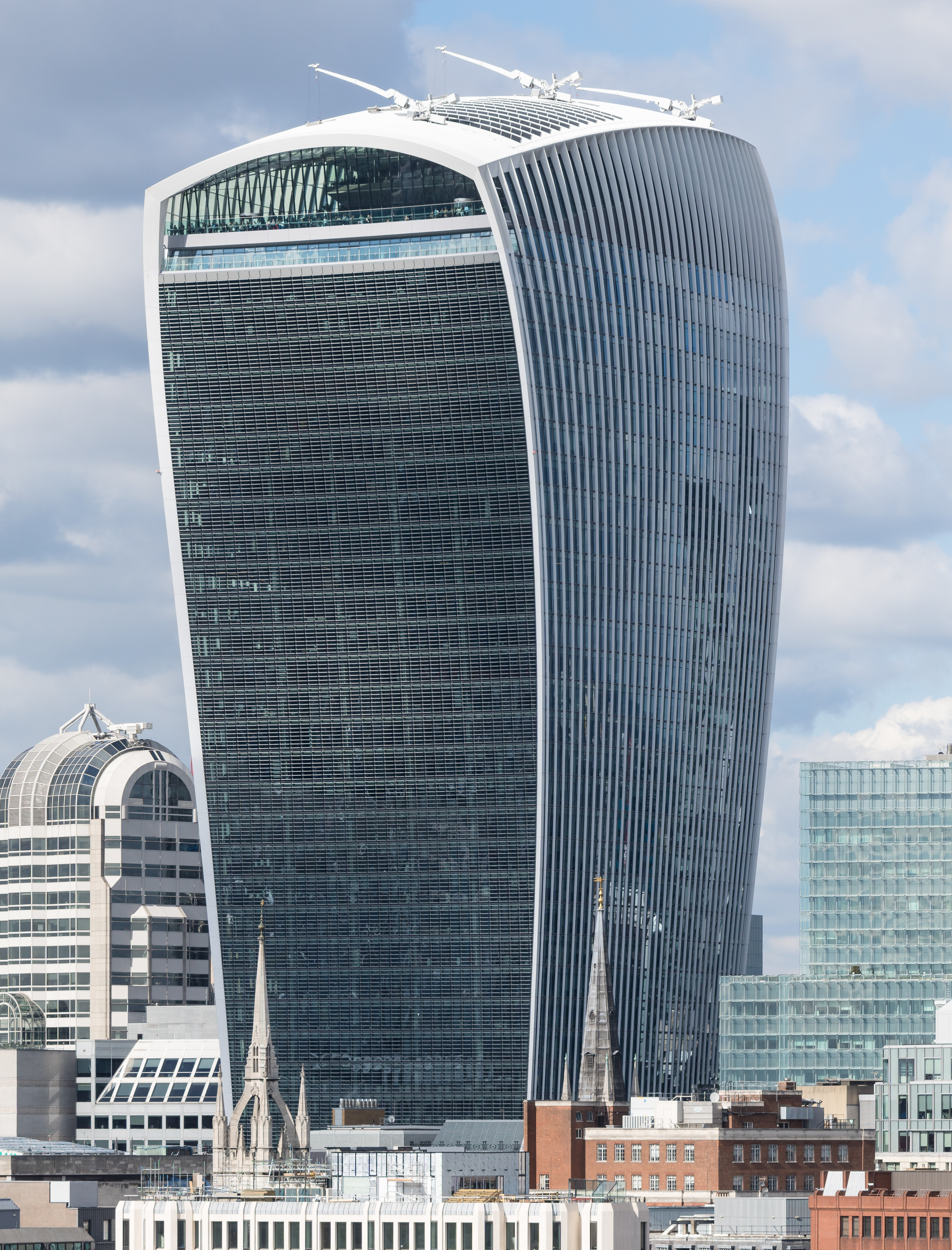
- 20 Fenchurch Street in 2015, viewed from the roof balcony of Old City Hall
- Interactive map of the 20 Fenchurch Street area

General information
- Status: Completed
- Architectural style: Neo-futurism
- Location: London, EC3
- Construction started: January 2009
- Completed: April 2014
- Owner: Lee Kum Kee

Height
- Roof: 160 m (525 ft)

Technical details
- Floor count: 37 (plus three-storey "sky garden")
- Floor area: Offices: 668,926 square feet (62,100 m^{2})

Design and construction
- Architects: Rafael Viñoly, Adamson Associates Architects (as executive architect)
- Developer: Land Securities and Canary Wharf Group
- Structural engineer: Halcrow Yolles
- Main contractor: Canary Wharf Contractors
- Awards: Carbuncle Cup

Website
- twentyfen.co.uk

20 Fenchurch Street is a commercial skyscraper in London that takes its name from its address on Fenchurch Street, in the historic City of London financial district. It has been nicknamed "The Walkie-Talkie" because of its distinctive shape, said to resemble a walkie-talkie handset. Construction was completed in spring 2014, and the three-floor "sky garden" was opened in January 2015. The 38-storey building is 160 m (525 ft) tall. Since July 2017, the building has been owned by Lee Kum Kee Groups.

Designed by architect Rafael Viñoly and costing over £200 million, 20 Fenchurch Street features a highly distinctive top-heavy form which appears to burst upward and outward. The entrance floor and 34 floors of office space are topped by a large viewing deck. A bar and restaurants are included on the 35th, 36th and 37th floors; these are, with restrictions, open to the public.

The tower was originally proposed at nearly 200 m (656 ft) tall but its design was scaled down after concerns about its visual impact on the nearby St Paul's Cathedral and Tower of London. It was subsequently approved in 2006 with the revised height. Even after the height reduction there were continued concerns from heritage groups about its impact on the surrounding area. The Secretary of State for Communities and Local Government, Ruth Kelly, called in the project for another public inquiry which, in 2007, ruled in the developers' favour and the building was granted full planning permission. In 2015 it was awarded the Carbuncle Cup for the worst new building in the UK in the previous 12 months.

== Ownership ==
Previously owned by the Land Securities Group, the company posted a £95m loss in 2016. In July 2017, the Hong Kong food company Lee Kum Kee Groups agreed to purchase the building from Land Securities and Canary Wharf Group for £1.3 billion. Savills Management Resources hold the contract to carry out all management of 20 Fenchurch Street.

== Previous building ==
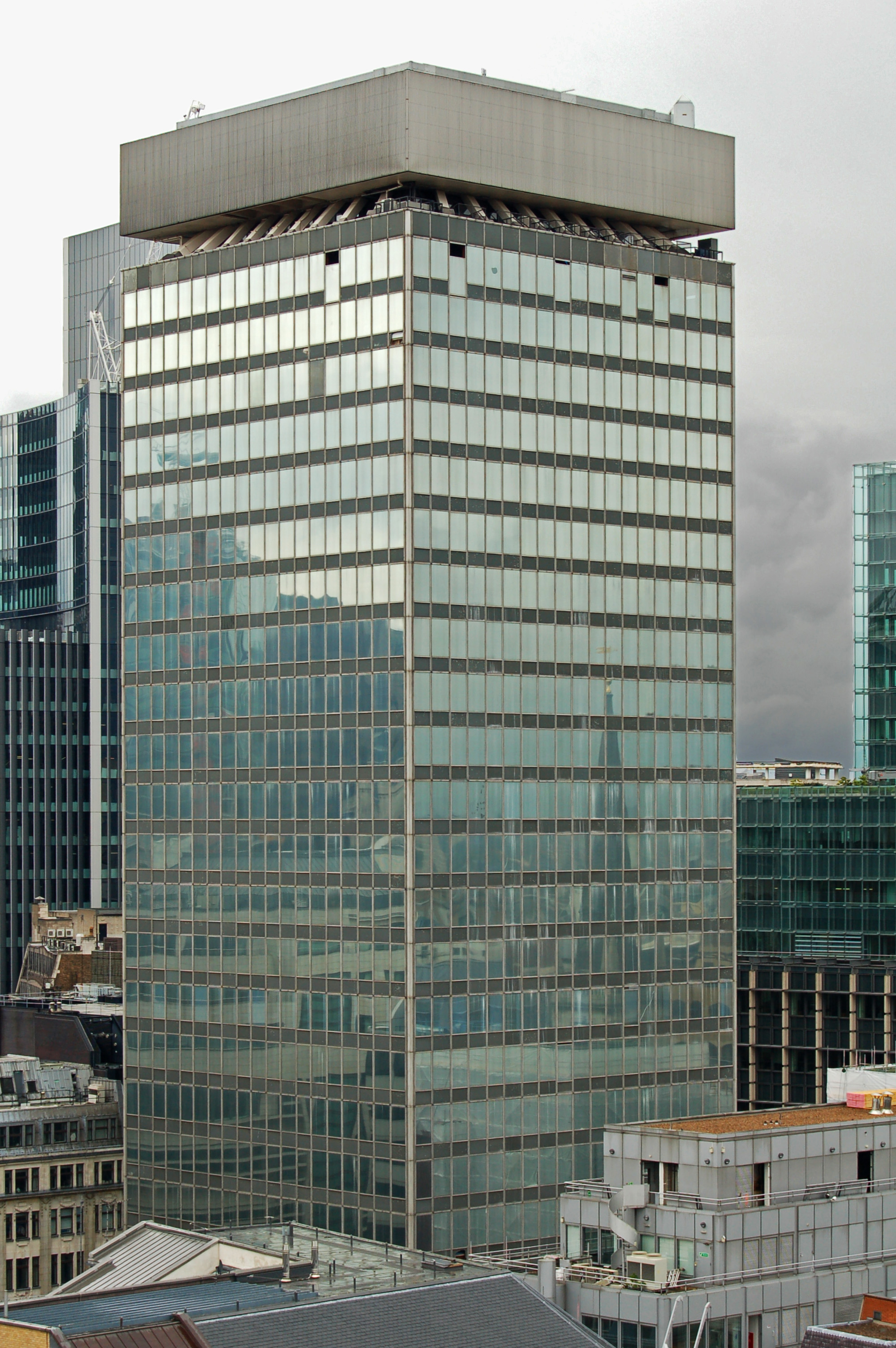
The previous building on the site, as seen from the Monument

The previous building at 20 Fenchurch Street was 91 m (299 ft) tall with 25 storeys and was built in 1968 by Land Securities. The architect was William H. Rogers.

The building was formerly occupied by Dresdner Kleinwort and was notable for being one of the first tall buildings in the City of London, and for its distinctive roof. It was one of the towers nearest to the River Thames when viewed from the southern end of London Bridge.

In 2007, one of the upper floors was used in the drama series Party Animals.

Demolition of the building was completed in 2008. Despite the top-down method of construction, it was not demolished from the bottom-up, as a temporary structure was built, allowing Keltbray, the demolition contractor, to demolish the building from the top down.

== Design ==
The new tower at 20 Fenchurch Street was designed by Uruguayan architect Rafael Viñoly.

The 'sky garden' at the top of the building was claimed by the developer to be London's highest public park, but since opening there have been debates about whether it can be described as a 'park', and whether it is truly 'public' given the access restrictions. The garden spans the top three floors, which are accessible by two express lifts and include a large viewing area, terrace, bar and two restaurants. Fourteen double-deck lifts (seven low-rise up to the 20th floor, seven high-rise above the 20th floor) serve the main office floors of the building.

The south side of the structure is ventilated externally to improve efficiency and decrease solar gain, whilst the east and west faces incorporate extensive solar shading. There is a southern entrance in addition to the main northern entrance set back from Fenchurch Street.

== Construction ==
In January 2009, Canary Wharf Contractors began piling on the site of 20 Fenchurch Street. Piling and ground works were completed in June 2009.

In January 2011, work at the basement level of the tower began. By the end of October 2011, the building was rising above street-level. December 2011 saw the tower's core begin to rise. The concrete core was topped out in March 2012 and by July the structural steelwork was under way around the core. Structural steelwork topped out in December 2012.

Fire protection was applied to the structural steelwork in December 2012, completing in March 2013. Cementitious spray was applied to the steelwork, which was supplied directly to the entire building using a purpose-built mixing and pumping station located on the ground floor.

The building completed to shell and floor in April 2014 and the first tenants began moving into the building from May 2014 prior to final completion in August of that year.

== Criticisms ==
=== Carbuncle Award ===
The building won the Carbuncle Cup in 2015, awarded by Building Design magazine to the worst new building in the UK during the previous year. The chairman of the jury that decided the prize, Thomas Lane, said "it is a challenge finding anyone who has something positive to say about this building", whilst a town planner at the nearby Royal Town Planning Institute described the building as "a daily reminder never to let such a planning disaster ever happen again." Earlier in 2013, during a public inquiry, Paul Finch of the Design Council CABE said he regretted supporting the project, saying that the developers "made a mess of it" and were architects of their own misfortune.

=== Solar glare problem ===
During the building's construction, it was discovered that for a period of up to two hours each day if the sun shines directly onto the building, it acts as a concave mirror and focuses light onto the streets to the south. Spot temperature readings at street-level including up to 91 °C (196 °F) and 117 °C (243 °F) were observed during summer 2013: the reflection of a beam of light up to six times brighter than direct sunlight shined onto the streets below, damaging parked vehicles, including one on Eastcheap whose owner was paid £946 by the developers for repairs to melted bodywork. Temperatures in direct line with the reflection became so high that City A.M. reporter Jim Waterson used the intense heat to fry an egg in a frying pan set down on the pavement. The reflection also burned or scorched the doormat of a shop in the affected area. The media responded by dubbing the building the "Walkie-Scorchie" and "Fryscraper".

In September 2013, the developers stated that the City of London Corporation had approved plans to erect temporary screening on the streets to prevent similar incidents, and that they were also "evaluating longer-term solutions to ensure the issue cannot recur in future". In 2014, a permanent awning was installed on the south side of the higher floors of the tower.

The building's architect, Rafael Viñoly, also designed the Vdara hotel in Las Vegas which has a similar sunlight reflection problem that some employees called the "Vdara death ray". The glass has since been covered with a non-reflective film.

In an interview with The Guardian, Viñoly said that horizontal louvre windows on the south side that had been intended to prevent this problem were removed at some point during the planning process. While he conceded that there had been "a lot of mistakes" with the building, he agreed with the building's developers that the sun was too high in the sky on that particular day. "[I] didn't realise it was going to be so hot", he said, suggesting that global warming was at fault. "When I first came to London years ago, it wasn't like this ... Now you have all these sunny days."

=== Sky garden ===
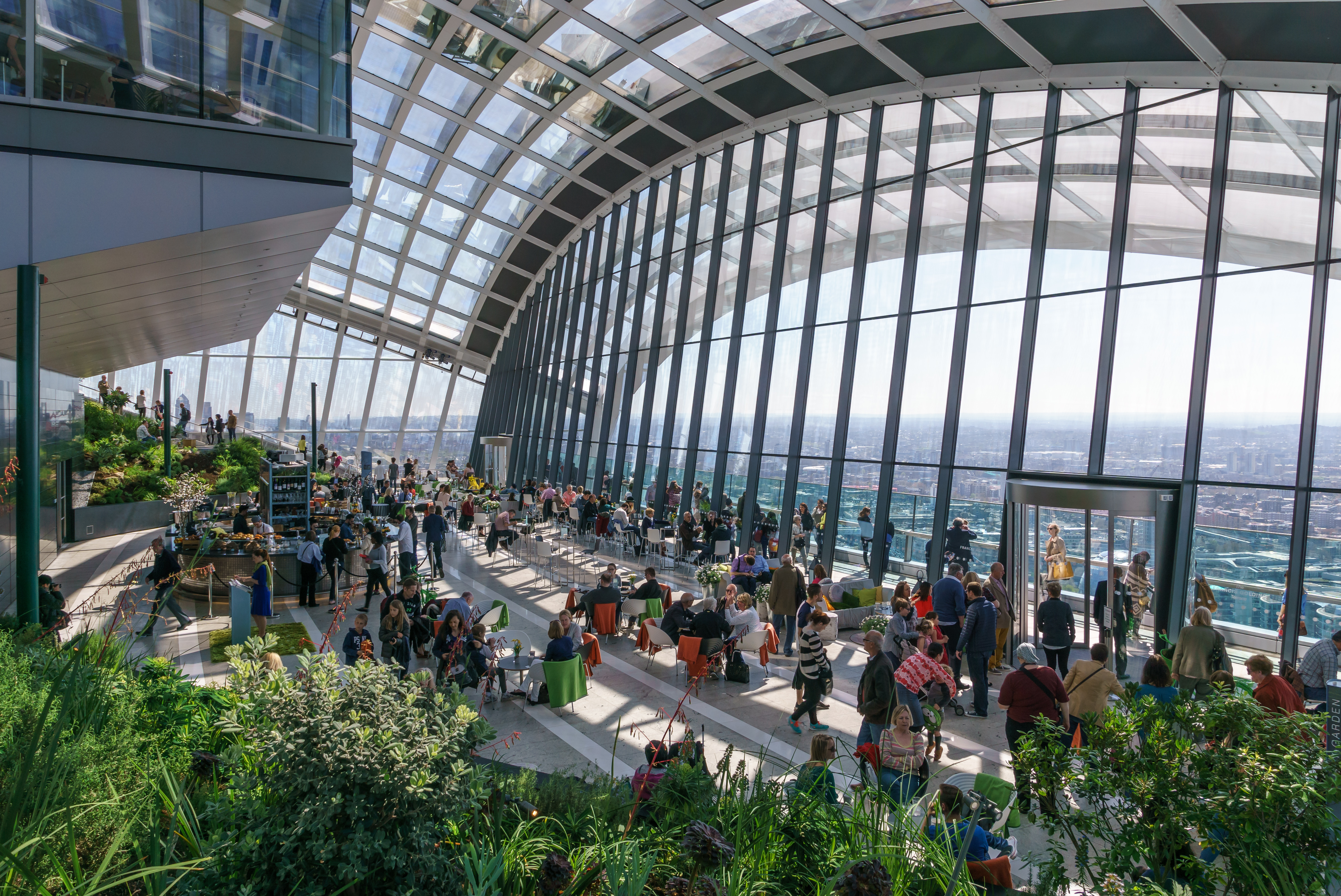
The 'sky garden' occupies the 36th to 38th storeys

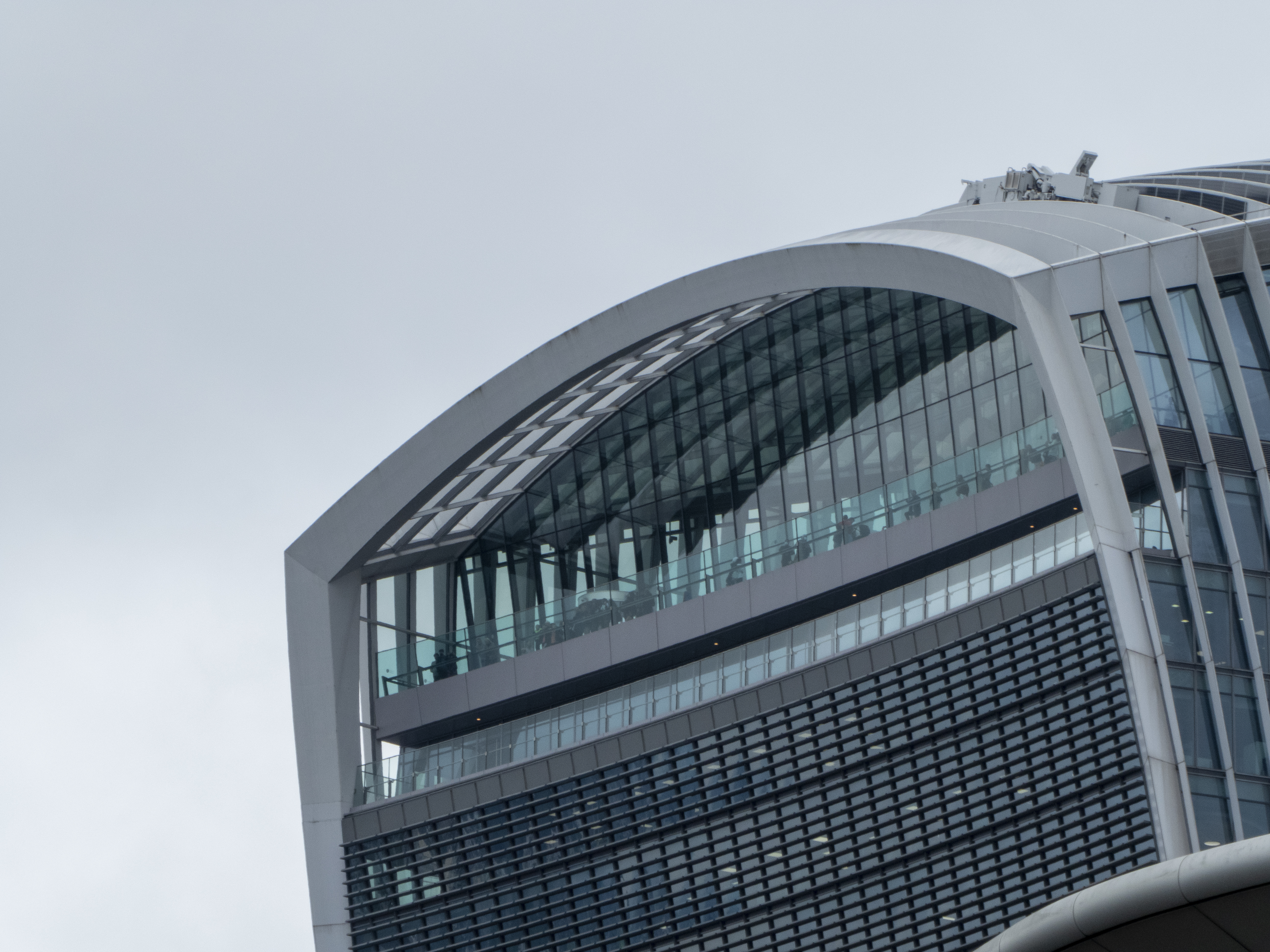
People on the balcony of the Sky Garden, as seen from street level

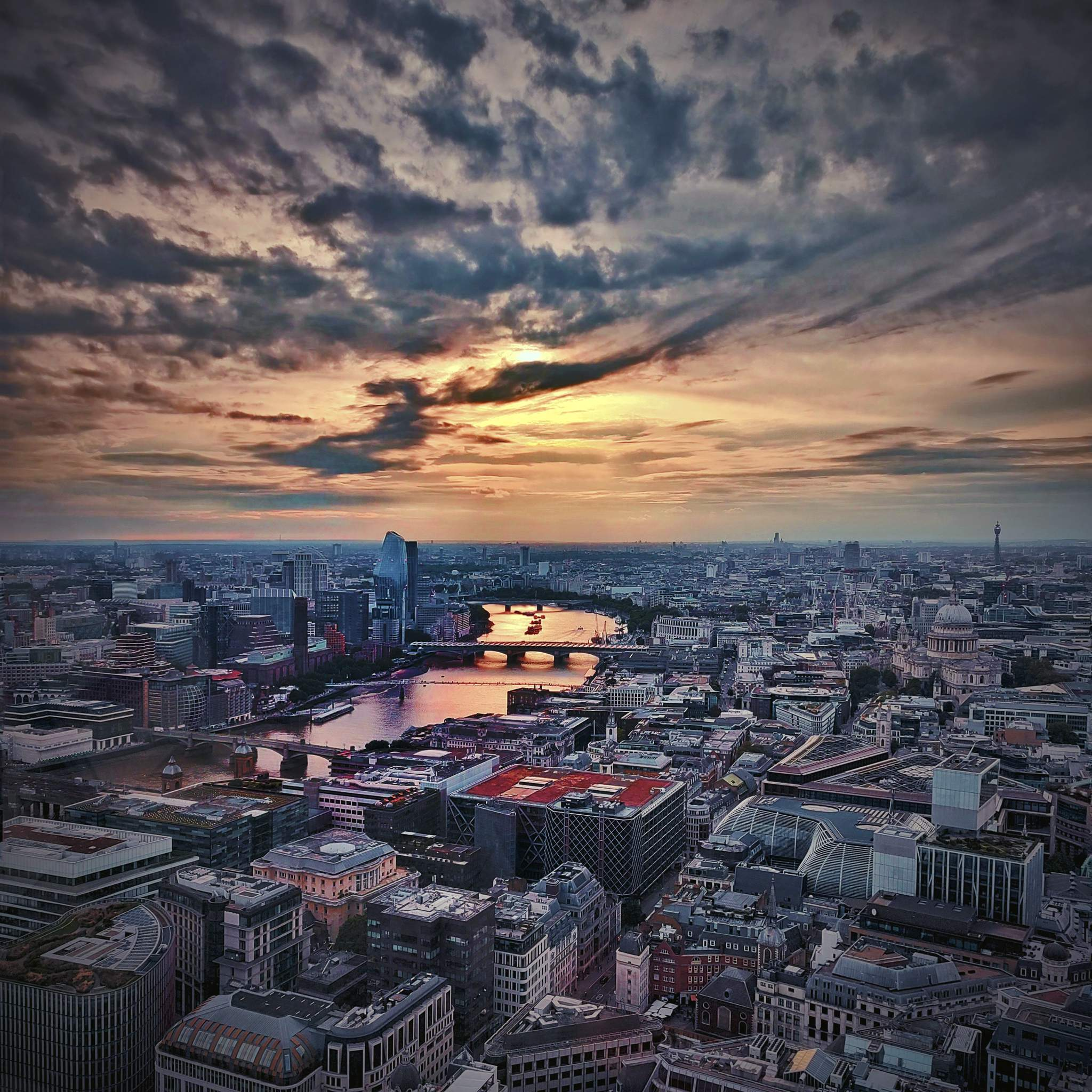
View to the west from the Sky Garden at sunset

The Sky Garden, which was described as a large, free, public viewing space at the top of the building, was part of the justification for the planners allowing such a vast office block to be built on the edge of a conservation area. Computer visualisations shown to the planners included a glade of full-height trees, but the garden as constructed has a slope with ferns and succulents instead.

Free access to the public is provided in 60-minute slots, until 18:00 on weekdays or 21:00 on weekends & Bank Holidays, after which the garden is available only to paying customers of the catering facilities.

The Garden has been criticised for these restrictions, and for its extent and quality failing to meet pre-construction expectations. Oliver Wainwright, architecture critic of The Guardian, described it as "a meagre pair of rockeries, in a space designed with all the finesse of a departure lounge".

The City of London Corporation's former chief planner, Peter Rees, who approved the structure, said: "I think calling it a sky garden is perhaps misleading. If people [are] expecting to visit it as an alternative to Kew, then they will be disappointed." In July 2015 it was reported that planners are to consider a landscape architect's alterations to the layout, following claims it is not consistent with illustrations submitted with the original planning application. The 'sky garden' was a key feature in sealing approval for the building, which is situated outside the main cluster of skyscrapers in the City.

=== Wind tunnel effect ===
In July 2015, the building was criticised for having an unexpected impact on wind strength at street-level. The City of London Corporation received an increased number of complaints about draughts around 20 Fenchurch Street following its completion. The Corporation's head of design, Gwyn Richards, said: "The wind outcome at street level experienced post-construction on a number of projects differs somewhat to the conditions we were expecting from the one outlined in the planning application wind assessments."

== Tenancy ==
In June 2012 the insurer Markel Corporation signed a tenancy agreement with the developers to move into 20 Fenchurch Street upon its completion. Markel, previously based on Leadenhall Street, was the first confirmed tenant of the new tower and occupies the 25th to 27th floors.

Another insurance company, Kiln Group, announced in September 2012 that it had agreed to become the building's second tenant and Ascot Underwriting followed in November 2012. Other insurance companies that have taken space in the building include RSA Group, Tokio Marine, CNA Financial, Allied World, Liberty Mutual's European operations, and Harry Townsend Corp.

International law firm DWF is also a tenant, occupying the 32nd floor.

As of 2017, the ground floor is let for retail and the office space is fully let.

CGI Inc the IT/business services group are a tenant.

== Gallery ==
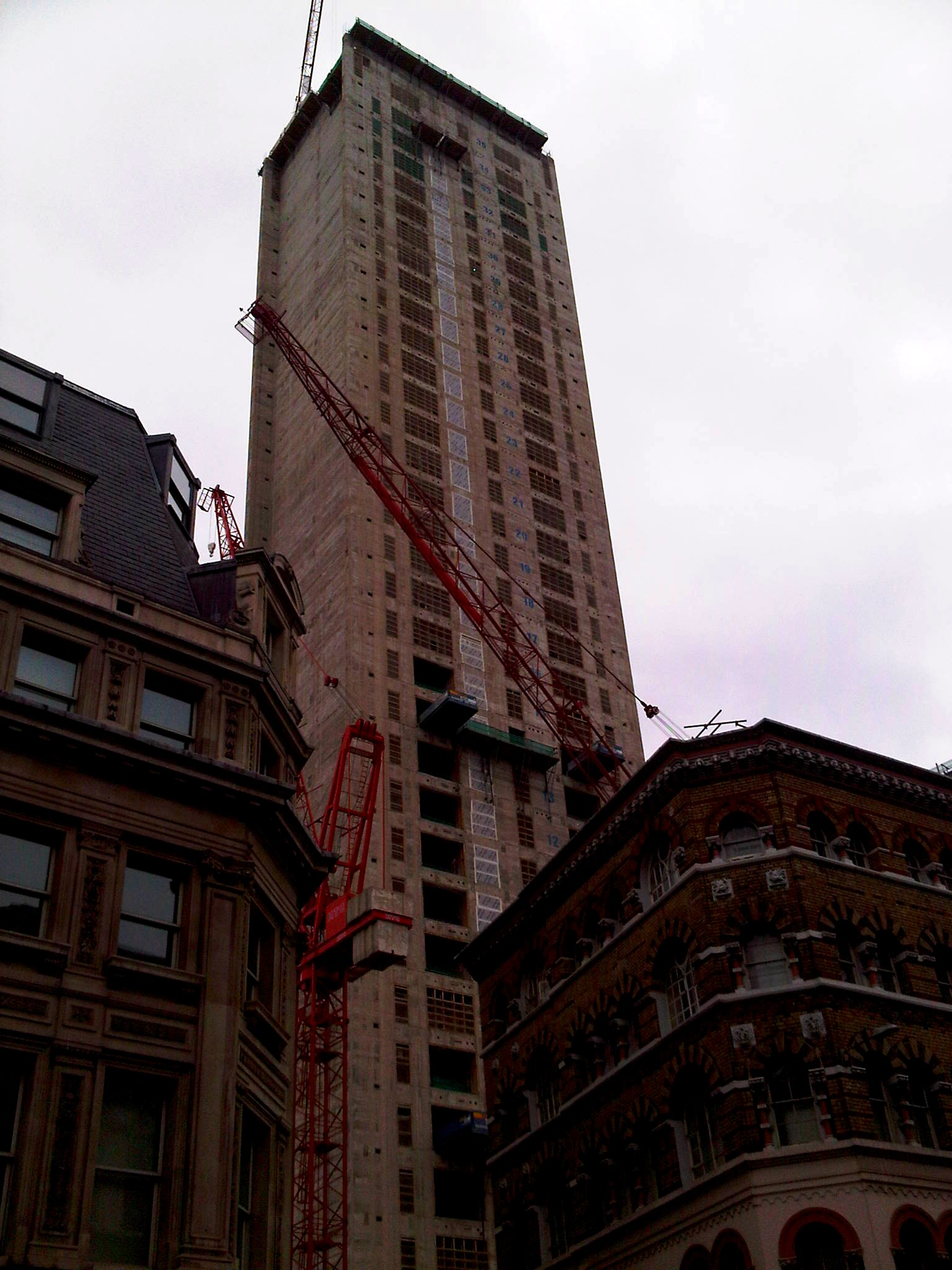
20 Fenchurch Street site, March 2012

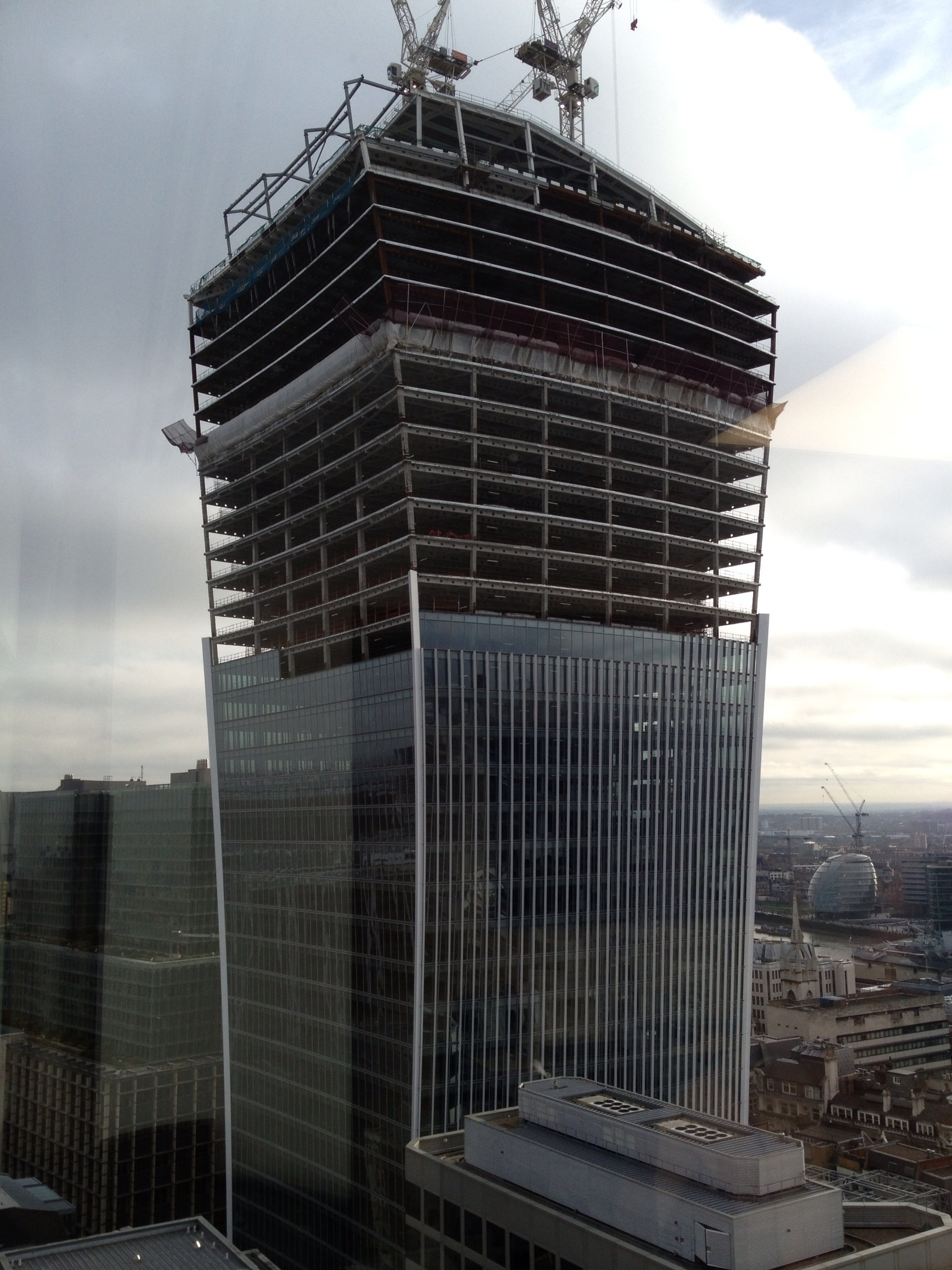
20 Fenchurch Street site, January 2013

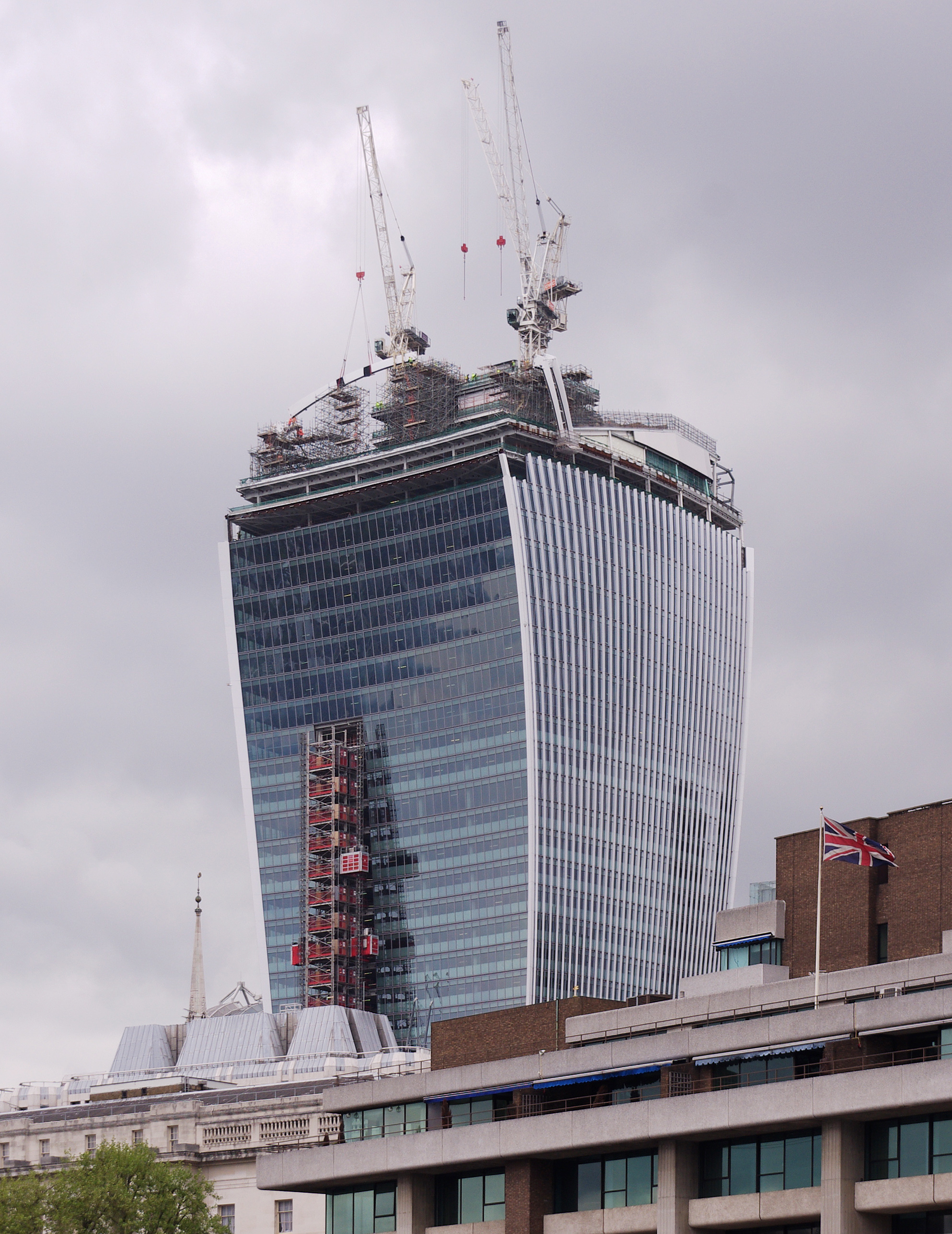
20 Fenchurch Street site, May 2013

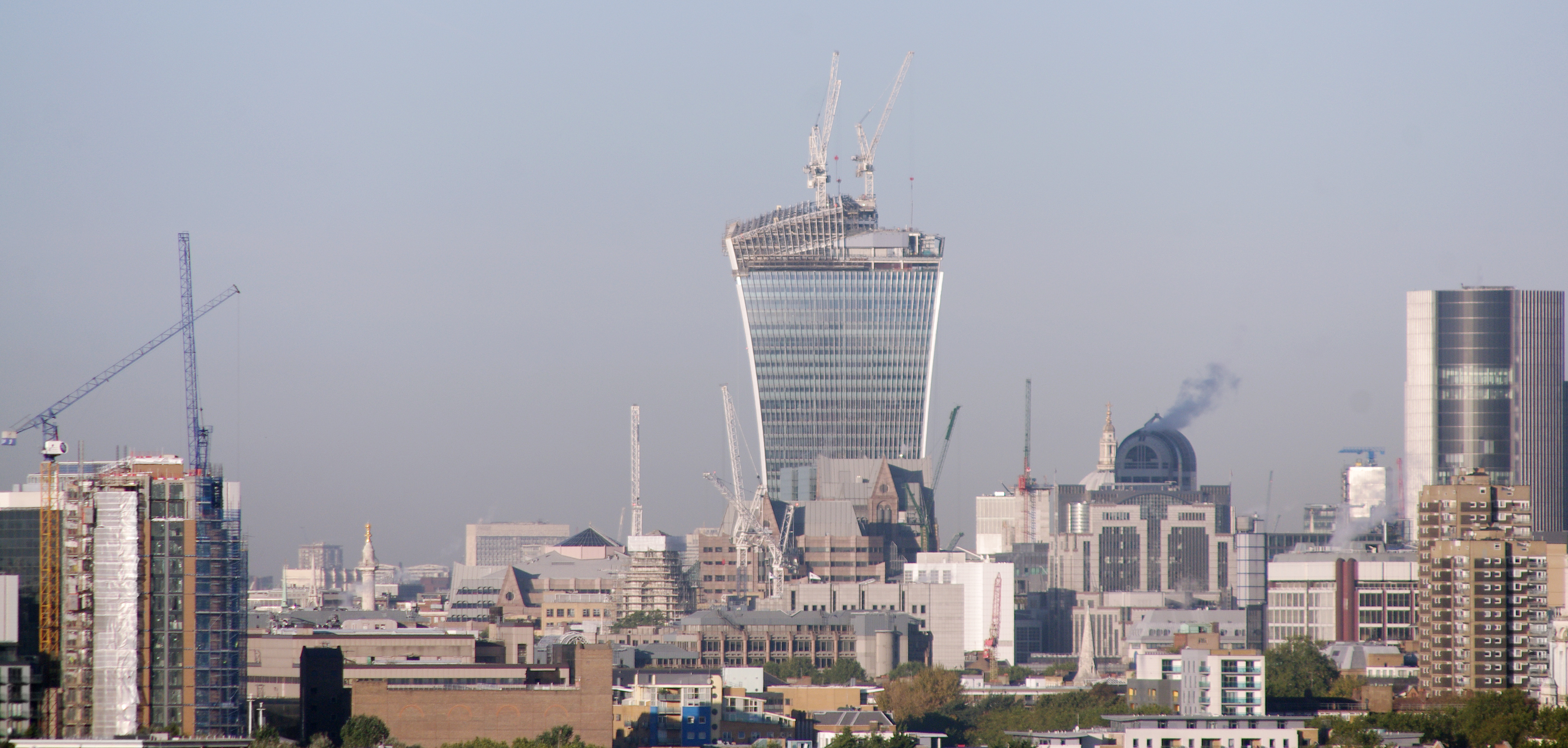
20 Fenchurch Street site, October 2013

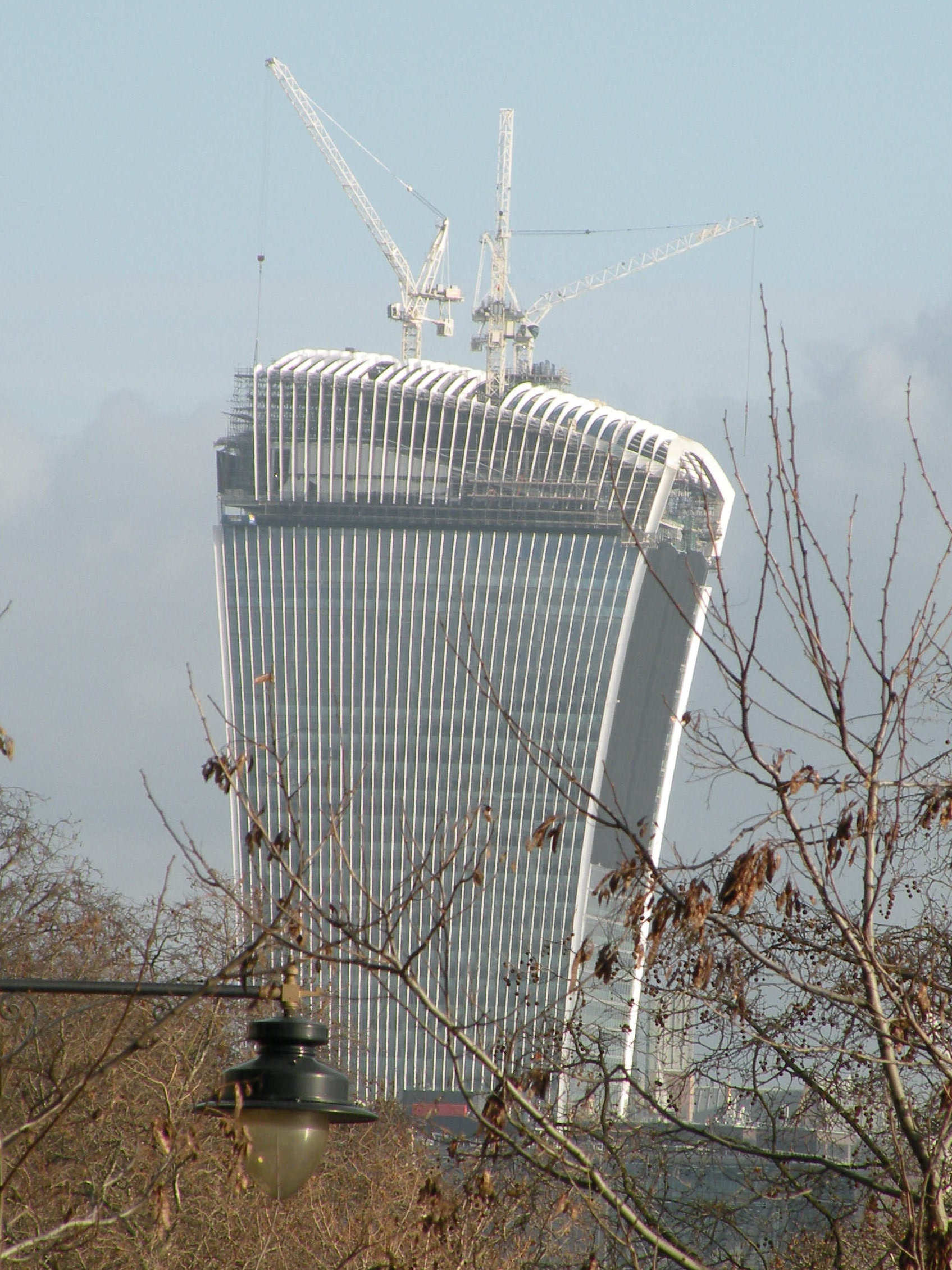
20 Fenchurch Street site, January 2014

== See also ==
- City of London landmarks
- 30 Fenchurch Street, a neighbouring office building
- St Margaret Pattens, a neighbouring 17th-century church
- Archimedes' heat ray
