= Rafael Viñoly =

Uruguayan architect (1944–2023)

Rafael Viñoly Beceiro
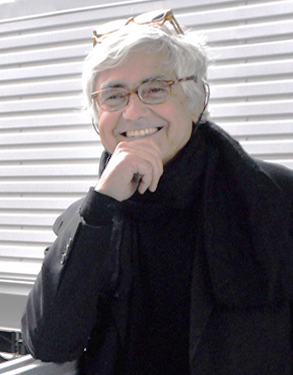
- Viñoly Beceiro in 2011
- Born: 1 June 1944; Montevideo, Uruguay
- Died: 2 March 2023 (aged 78); New York City, New York, United States
- Education: University of Buenos Aires
- Occupation: Architect
- Awards: International Fellow, The Royal Institute of British Architects (2007), Medal of Honor, American Institute of Architects, New York Chapter (1995), National Academician, The National Academy (1994)
- Practice: Rafael Viñoly Architects PC
- Buildings: Brooklyn Children's Museum; Tokyo International Forum; The Kimmel Center for the Performing Arts; Cleveland Museum of Art; David L. Lawrence Convention Center; Howard Hughes Medical Institute Janelia Farm Research Campus; Bronx County Hall of Justice; Carrasco International Airport; 432 Park Avenue; 20 Fenchurch Street; NEMA (Chicago)
- Website: vinoly.com

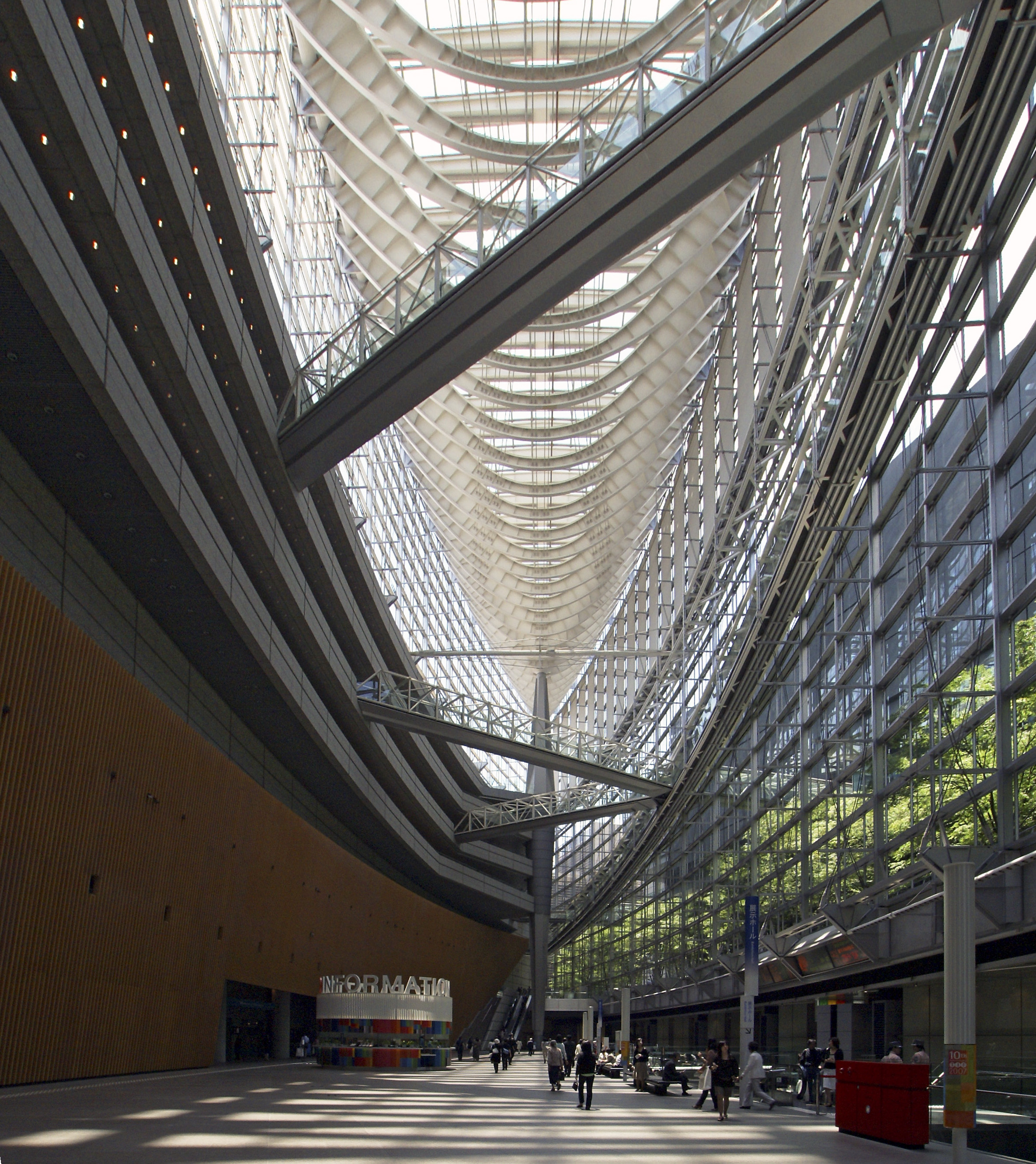
Interior of Tokyo International Forum

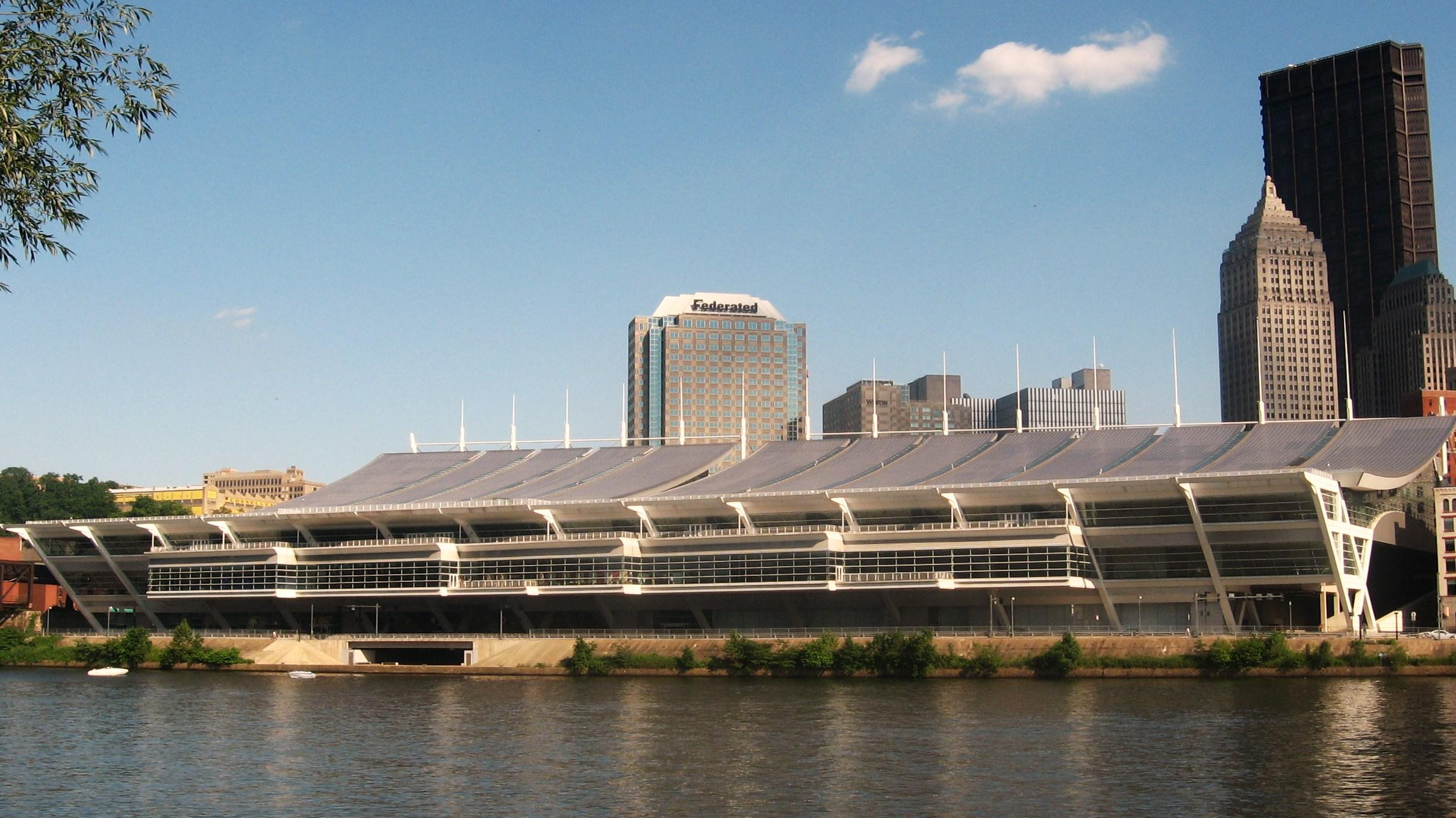
David L. Lawrence Convention Center in Pittsburgh

Rafael Viñoly Beceiro (1 June 1944 – 2 March 2023) was a Uruguayan-born architect based in New York. He was the principal of Rafael Viñoly Architects, which he founded in 1983. The firm has offices in New York City, Palo Alto, London, Manchester, Abu Dhabi, and Buenos Aires. Viñoly designed landmark buildings internationally.

Viñoly rose to international prominence with his Tokyo International Forum. Reviewing the Museum of Modern Art's exhibition of models and drawings for the building while it was still under construction, the then New York Times architecture critic Herbert Muschamp hailed Viñoly's design as "a monument to the idea of openness" that "revives faith in architecture as an instrument of intellectual clarity". At the same time, some of his works have been widely panned, including one of his high-profile designs, the so-called "Walkie-Talkie," which detractors dubbed the "Walkie Scorchy” and “fryescraper”. It was named this after it focused light from the sun to a point and melted peoples' cars on August 30, 2013.

== Early life ==
Viñoly was born in Montevideo, Uruguay, on 1 June 1944, to Román Viñoly Barreto, a film and theater director, and Maria Beceiro, a math teacher. "It was a cultivated household where the architecture of Le Corbusier, the art of translation, or the conducting of Arturo Toscanini might form part of the table talk," wrote Louis Jebb, in The Art Newspaper. "The family moved to Buenos Aires when Rafael was five years old, after his father was invited to the city to direct Wagner's music drama Die Walküre at the city's Teatro Colón. Viñoly attended the University of Buenos Aires, receiving a Diploma in Architecture (1968) and a Master of Architecture (1969) from the Faculty of Architecture and Urbanism.

== Career ==
In 1964, he formed an architectural firm in Buenos Aires with six associates (Flora Manteola, Ignacio Petchersky, Javier Sánchez Gómez, Josefina Santos, and Justo Solsona). This practice, which came to be known as M/SG/S/S/S, or MSGSSS, would go on to become one of the largest architectural practices in South America, completing many significant commissions in a very short time.

In 1978, Viñoly and his family relocated to the United States. For a brief period, he served as a guest lecturer at the Harvard Graduate School of Design. In 1979, he settled permanently in New York City where, in 1983, he founded the firm Rafael Viñoly Architects PC. His first major project in New York was the John Jay College of Criminal Justice, completed in 1988. In 1989, he won an international competition to design the Tokyo International Forum, which was completed in 1996. His firm's design was one of the finalists in the World Trade Center design competition.

During the course of his 40-plus year career, Viñoly practiced in the United States, Latin America, Europe, Asia, and the Middle East.

Viñoly was a Fellow of the American Institute of Architects, an International Fellow of the Royal Institute of British Architects, and a member of the Japan Institute of Architects and the Argentinian Sociedad Central de Arquitectos.

=== Reputation ===
Viñoly earned a reputation as "a serene functionalist and a master of institutional design", as an unbylined article in Metropolis put it, noting that "schools, civic buildings, convention centers, and the like have long been the mainstay of Viñoly's practice." "I'm very interested in unglamorousness!" he said, in the same article. About the human use of buildings, as opposed to architecture as monumental sculpture, he said "People don't understand how important this kind of thing is. If you remember, 10, 15 years ago, if you weren't working on a museum you weren't an architect. With hospitals, that level of snobbism would never have been applicable—nobody gives a royal screw about that stuff". John Gravois, writing in the UAE National News, applauded Viñoly's "affinity for the nerdy, workmanlike challenges of designing complex institutional architecture: hospitals, a nanosystems institute, a cancer research center. His buildings often seem designed not to be photographed from the air but to be used and experienced – from both the inside and out. And he displays the distinctly unstar-like habit of designing structures that respect their neighbors." As well, Gravois observed, he deplores "the insidiousness of contemporary architectural culture", singling out for criticism buildings "that tend to do only one thing, which is to create the sense of fame".

== Personal life ==
Viñoly was married to the interior designer Diana Viñoly, whose aesthetic sensibility he once described as "mixed and unorthodox but never busy. There is a narrative to the objects she selects and each house is like a living thing. Nothing's ever composed, static, or finished. ... How she does it I don't know."

Their son, Román Viñoly, is the director of Rafael Viñoly Architects. Viñoly also had two stepsons.

The family lived in multiple locations: Tribeca, New York City; Water Mill on Long Island, New York (where Viñoly built a piano house for his collection of nine concert grand pianos); and London. Viñoly had an office in New York City at 50 Vandam Street since 1990 until he was evicted for the development of 7 Hudson Square; he moved his firm to South Street Seaport afterward.

He also "remained connected to his home country, spending summers in Montevideo, and designing there as well," wrote Elizabeth Fazzare, in an obituary for Architectural Digest. "One of his most handsome recent projects is the Laguna Garzón Bridge, a circular road deck and pedestrian walkway whose design allows an eco-friendly crossing over the environmentally sensitive 4,448-acre lagoon on the nation's coast."

Viñoly died from an aneurysm in New York City on 2 March 2023. He was 78.

== Legacy ==
New York magazine's Curbed site remembered Viñoly in its obituary as "prolific and polarizing", the quintessential New York architect, committed to the "'relatively small, rocky island,' as he once called it, 'with this urban experiment, which is so unique and irreproducible.'" Noting the "astonishing" number of major projects he "left scattered across that island and its adjacent territories", most memorably the controversial supertall, super-skinny Midtown condo building (its width-to-height ratio is 1:16) at 432 Park Avenue, the design critic Ian Volner observed, "Anyone so frantically prolific was bound to run into the clothesline of public opinion at some point." Ticking off Viñoly's most problem-plagued buildings—his 20 Fenchurch Street tower in London and his Vdara resort complex in Las Vegas, whose glazed façades turned reflected sunlight into a blistering "death ray"—Volner suggested that his "attraction to ideas like transparency and simplicity trumped other, more quotidian considerations". Nonetheless, he applauded the architect's "commitment to making a more beautiful, more functional New York," singling out the elegant front of his athletics facility for Lehman College ("a nautiluslike curl of steel and glass") and his Spitzer School of Architecture at City College ("crisp and modest and clear") as exemplars of his sleek, modernist aesthetic.

Fred A. Bernstein, writing in The New York Times, noted Viñoly's avoidance of a "signature style" beyond his allegiance to modernism and his "penchant for enclosing large spaces under glass, creating luminous interiors". In another Times article, the architect David Rockwell, who worked with him on several projects, most notably on a proposal for the rebuilding of the World Trade Center, recalled the team's vision of the twin towers reborn as a structure that spiraled defiantly skyward, "a filigreed weave of steel and air [that] would transform the center for trade to one of civics and culture"—a testimonial, Rockwell recalled, to "Rafael's love and belief in the power of beauty and culture."

By contrast, Louis Jebb, writing in The Art Newspaper, focused on Viñoly's refusal to dismiss "nerdy", unglamorous projects as beneath him. "In an era when every 'starchitect' worth the name was chasing glamorous museum commissions, Viñoly was just as happy to be recognized for his work with laboratories, hospitals and universities," wrote Jebb. "The architects he most admired included, historically, Andrea Palladio, and in the modern era Oscar Niemeyer, creator of Brasília, and the minimalist master Mies van der Rohe, whose Seagram Building (completed 1958) was Viñoly's favorite in New York. But the forebear whose buildings appeared to have moved him the most was the Philadelphian magus Louis Kahn":

In a 2021 interview [...] Viñoly spoke about Kahn's celebrated Salk Institute building in La Jolla, California (1962–65), founded by Jonas Salk, the celebrated developer of a successful polio vaccine. First, Viñoly noted, the Salk Institute is a great laboratory—one where ground-breaking research in molecular biology is still done 60 years on. The acid functional test. But, at the end, he said, "it does one thing. You walk [between the two embracing wings] overlooking the ocean. All of a sudden, you feel you are good. You feel somehow that something has touched you that has changed the plane of the experience. Being elevated. It's like late Rembrandt."

Beyond his buildings, Viñoly's legacy in the field, according to the Uruguayan-American architect Amir Kripper, includes paving the way "for architects coming to the U.S. from South America and getting major projects and recognition."

In an Architect's Newspaper article headlined "Rafael Viñoly, who died in March, remains an inspiration to Latino/a architects in the United States," Kripper recalled "being mesmerized," as an undergraduate at the School of Architecture at Universidad de la República Uruguay, by photos of Viñoly's Tokyo International Forum. The Uruguayan architect "immediately received the kind of attention normally reserved for our soccer players who emigrated to Europe to play in the English Premier, Spanish, or Italian Leagues," he wrote. Later, Kripper worked with Rodolfo Machado and Jorge Silvetti (former classmates of Viñoly's) at Machado and Silvetti Associates (now Machado Silvetti) in Boston. "Our shared connection with Viñoly was an additional, beneficial layer to our rapport, and once again I found myself inspired by the possibilities of stepping beyond cultural background, country of birth, and language, solely based on the work," wrote Kripper. He would go on to found Kripper Studio, a minority-owned architecture firm in Boston. "Viñoly was a bridge and an open door to the fact that ... a person with a clearly different name, with an accent included, could become an architect, an entrepreneur, a businessperson, and a founder of a company in the United States."

== Major works ==
Major works by Viñoly include the Stavros Niarchos Foundation-David Rockefeller River Campus at Rockefeller University, 432 Park Avenue in Manhattan, 20 Fenchurch Street in London, the Curve Theatre Leicester, and Firstsite art gallery in Colchester, Essex.

== Criticism ==
=== Carbuncle Cup ===
20 Fenchurch Street in London won the 2015 Carbuncle Cup for its ugliness.

=== Sun glare ===
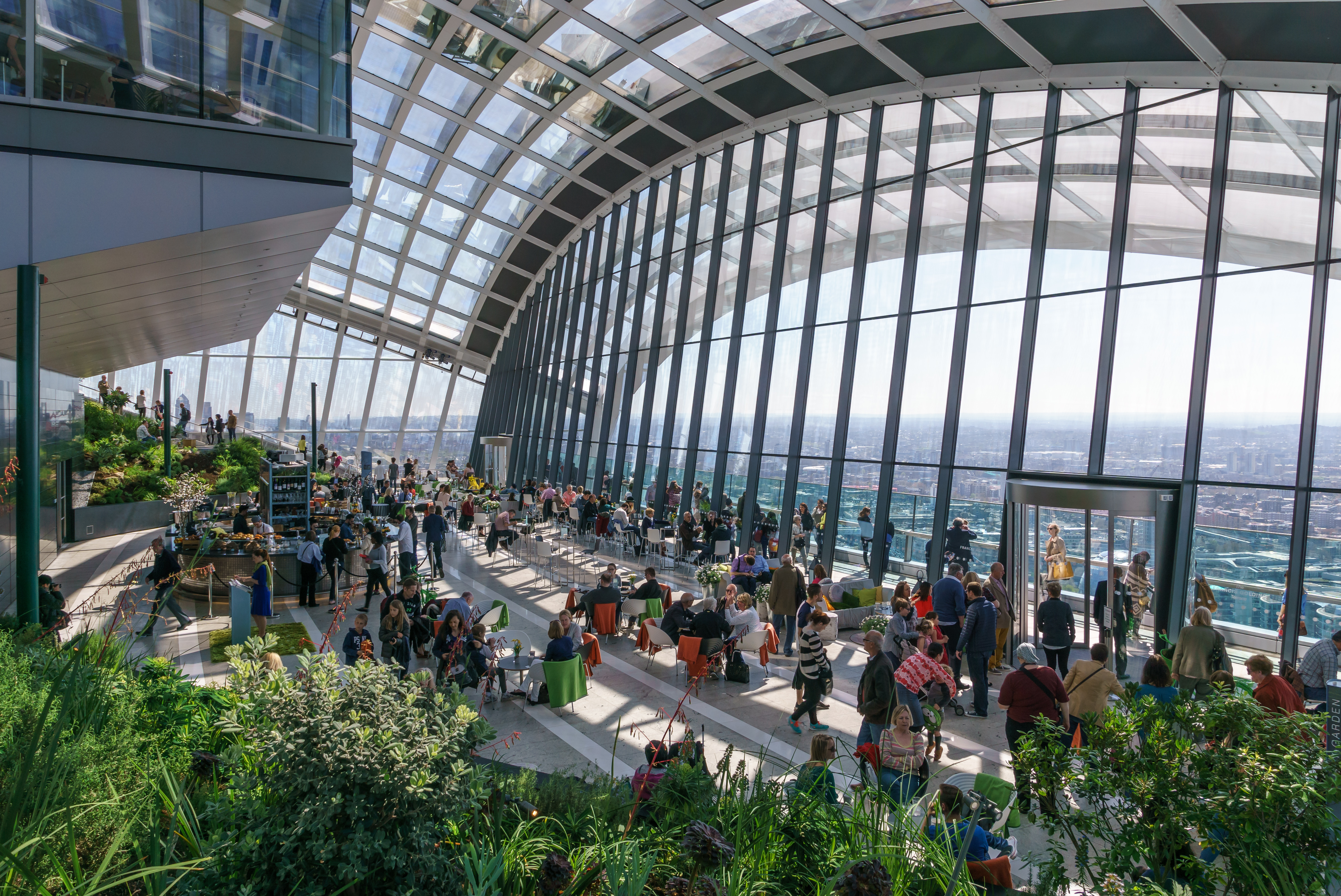
The Sky Garden, at 20 Fenchurch Street

Two of the skyscrapers designed by Viñoly, the Vdara in Las Vegas and 20 Fenchurch Street in London, have experienced sun reflectivity problems as a result of their concave curved glass exteriors, which act as cylindrical and spherical reflectors, respectively. In 2010, the Las Vegas Review-Journal reported that sunlight reflecting off the Vdara's south-facing tower could make swimmers in the hotel pool uncomfortably warm and had been known to melt plastic cups and shopping bags; employees of the hotel referred to the phenomenon as the "Vdara death ray". In London, sunlight reflecting off 20 Fenchurch Street during the summer of 2013 melted parts on a parked Jaguar and scorched the carpet of a nearby barber shop.

=== 432 Park Avenue ===
432 Park Avenue has been the subject of numerous lawsuits and complaints regarding flooding, electrical problems, and excess building sway.

== Musical instruments ==
A serious amateur pianist, Viñoly collaborated with piano builder Chris Maene on a new concert grand piano design with a curved ergonomic keyboard that could facilitate easier access to the lowest and highest notes simultaneously.

A foot longer than a typical concert grand and hosting no crossed strings, the Maene-Viñoly piano was completed in 2022 and premiered at the Verbier Festival played by Kirill Gerstein. In the months after Viñoly's death, the instrument was hosted at the Philadelphia Orchestra and featured at a Carnegie Hall concert in November of 2023 where it was played by Jonathan Biss.

== Honors and awards ==
- Design Honor, Salvadori Center, 2007
- International Fellow, The Royal Institute of British Architects, 2006
- National Design Award Finalist, Cooper-Hewitt National Design Museum, 2004
- Neutra Medal for Professional Excellence: In recognition for his contributions to the Environmental Design Profession and in honor of Modernist architect Richard Neutra, 2000.
- Honorary Doctorate, University of Maryland, 1997
- Medal of Honor, American Institute of Architects, New York City Chapter, 1995
- National Academician, The National Academy of Design, 1994
- Fellow, American Institute of Architects, 1993
- Konex Award, Konex Foundation, Argentina, 1992
