= William H. Rogers (architect) =

English architect (1914–2008)

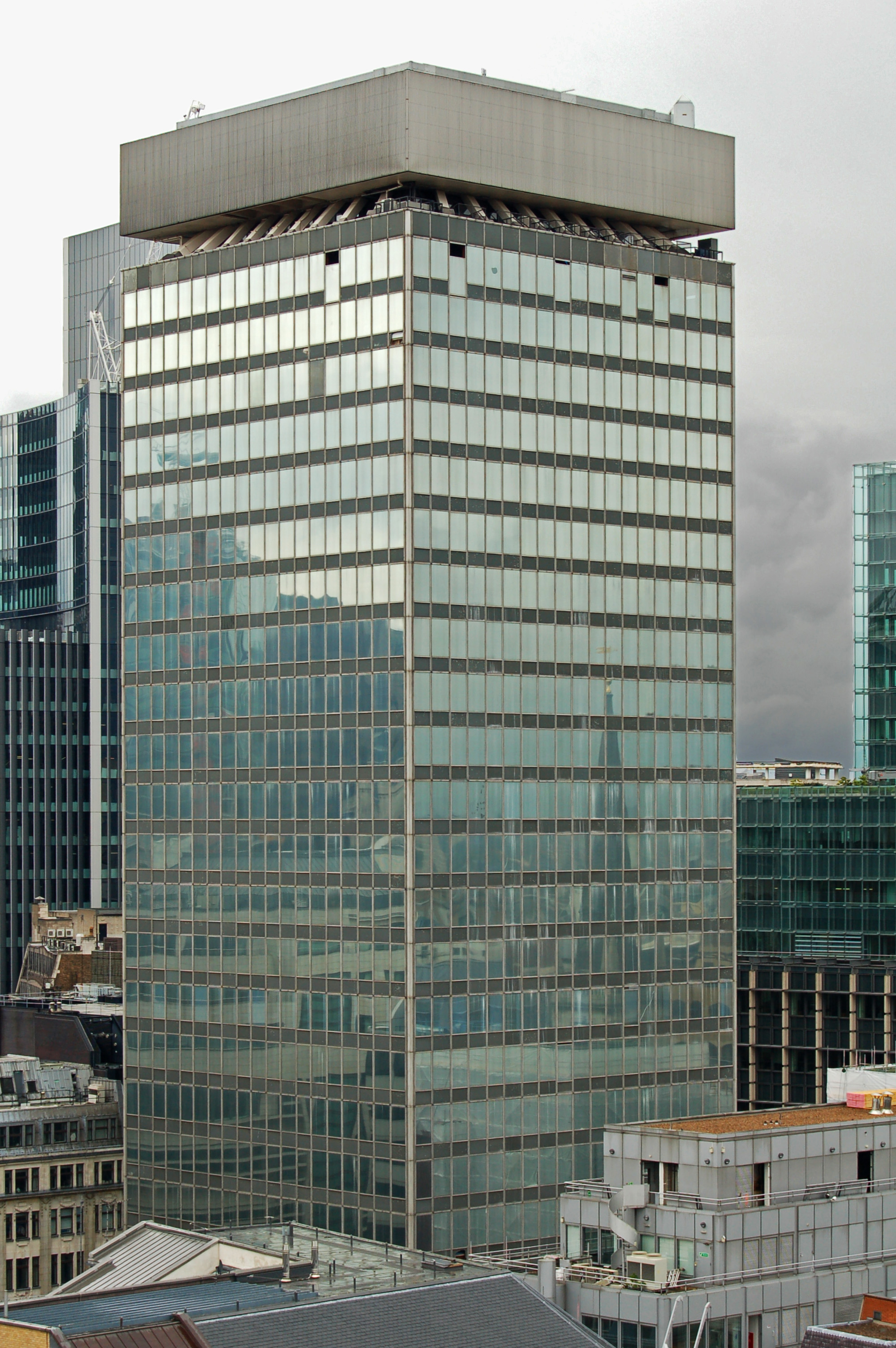
20 Fenchurch Street (1968–2008), designed by Rogers

William H. Rogers (18 February 1914 – 26 July 2008) was an English architect. His most notable building was the original 20 Fenchurch Street in the City of London, which was occupied by Kleinwort Benson from 1968 to 2006.

At the time of his death, the building was in the process of being demolished to make way for a new landmark skyscraper nicknamed the Walkie Talkie.

The first building he designed in the City was at 15-16 Basinghall Street. He was Chief Architect of the City of London Real Property Company, which later became part of Land Securities.
