= Double-deck elevator =

Elevator with two cabs stacked on top of each other

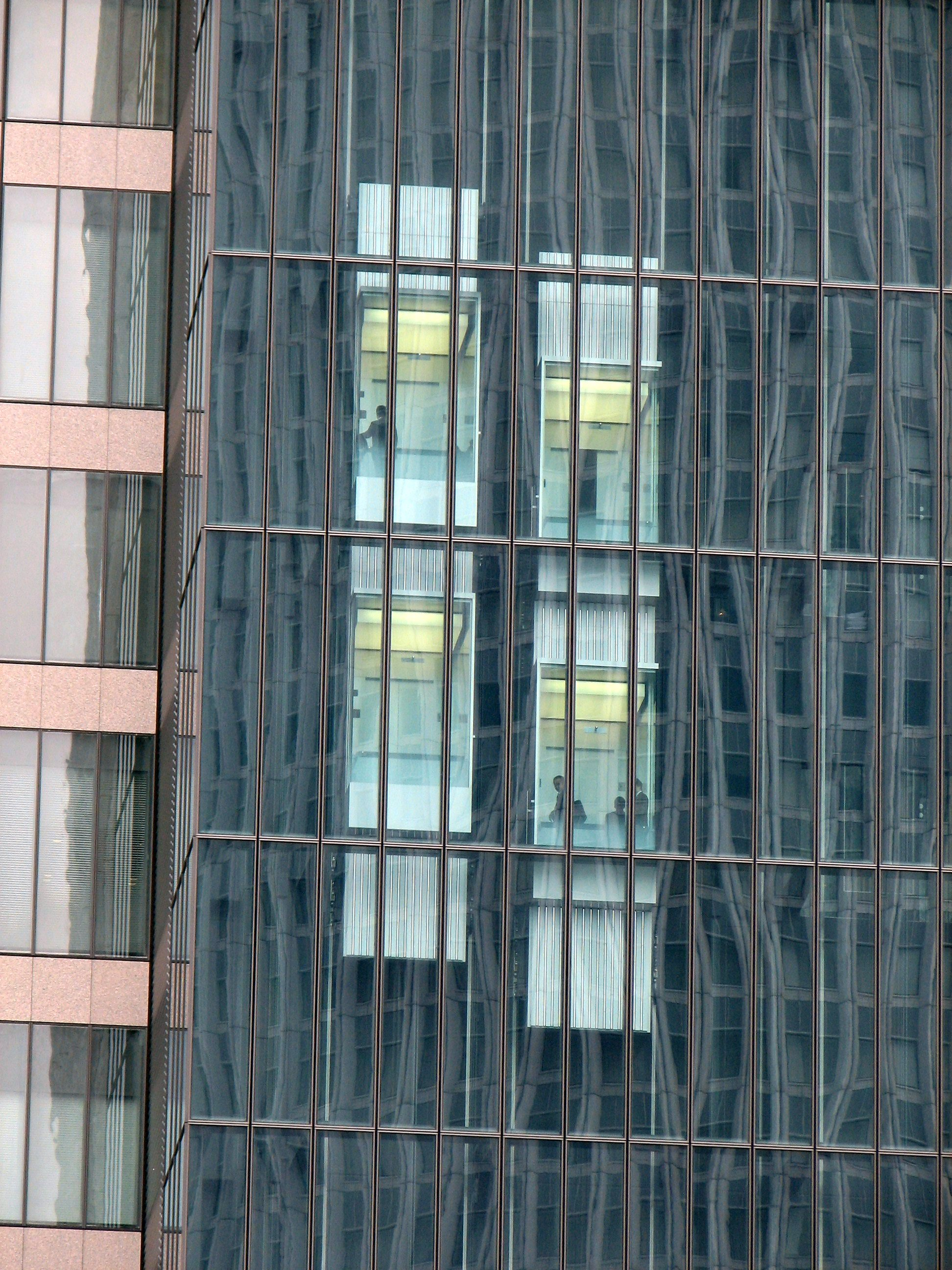
Double-deck elevators at Midland Square, Nagoya, Japan

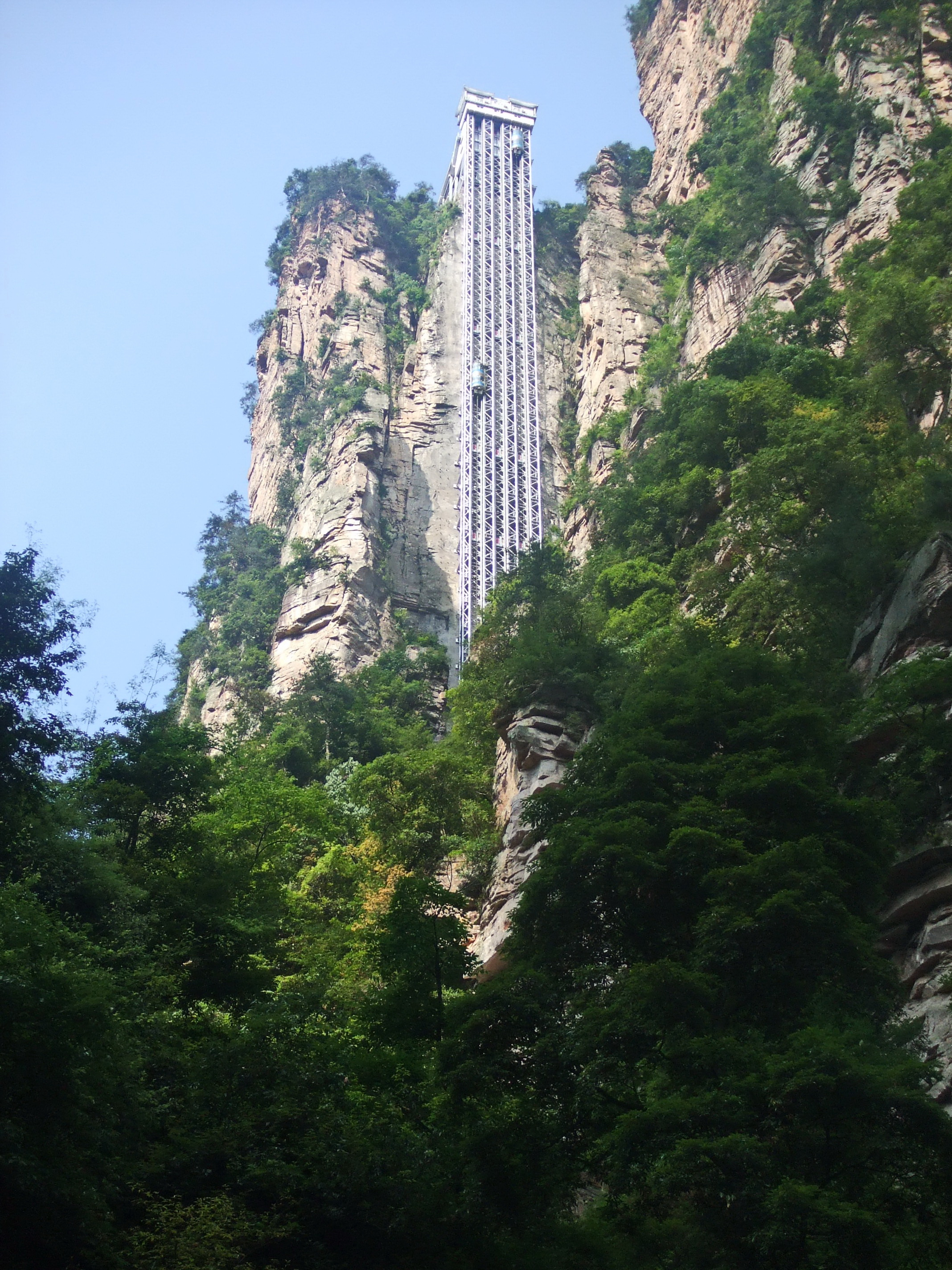
The Bailong Elevator

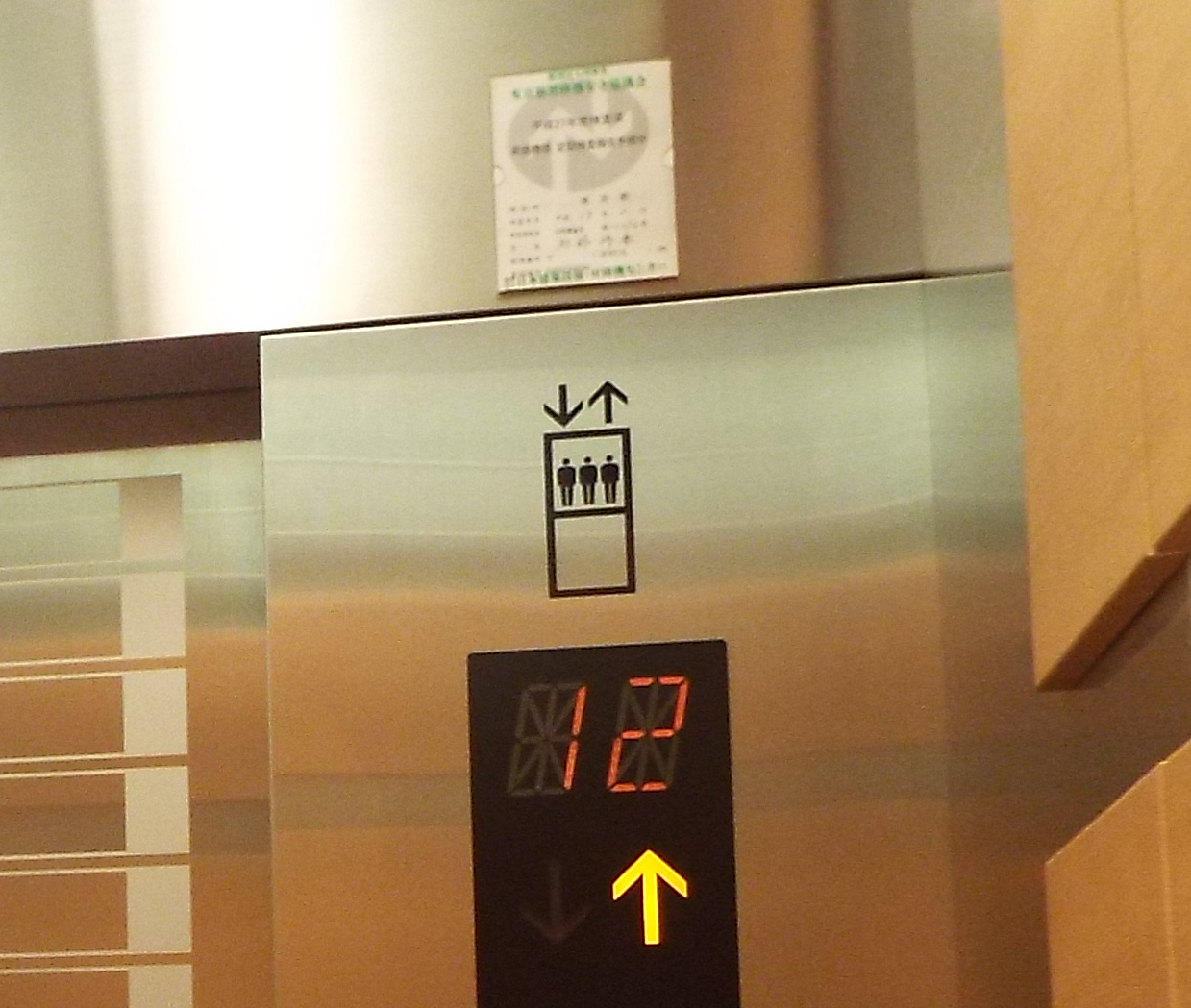
Symbol seen within the upper cabin of the elevator in Roppongi Hills Mori Tower

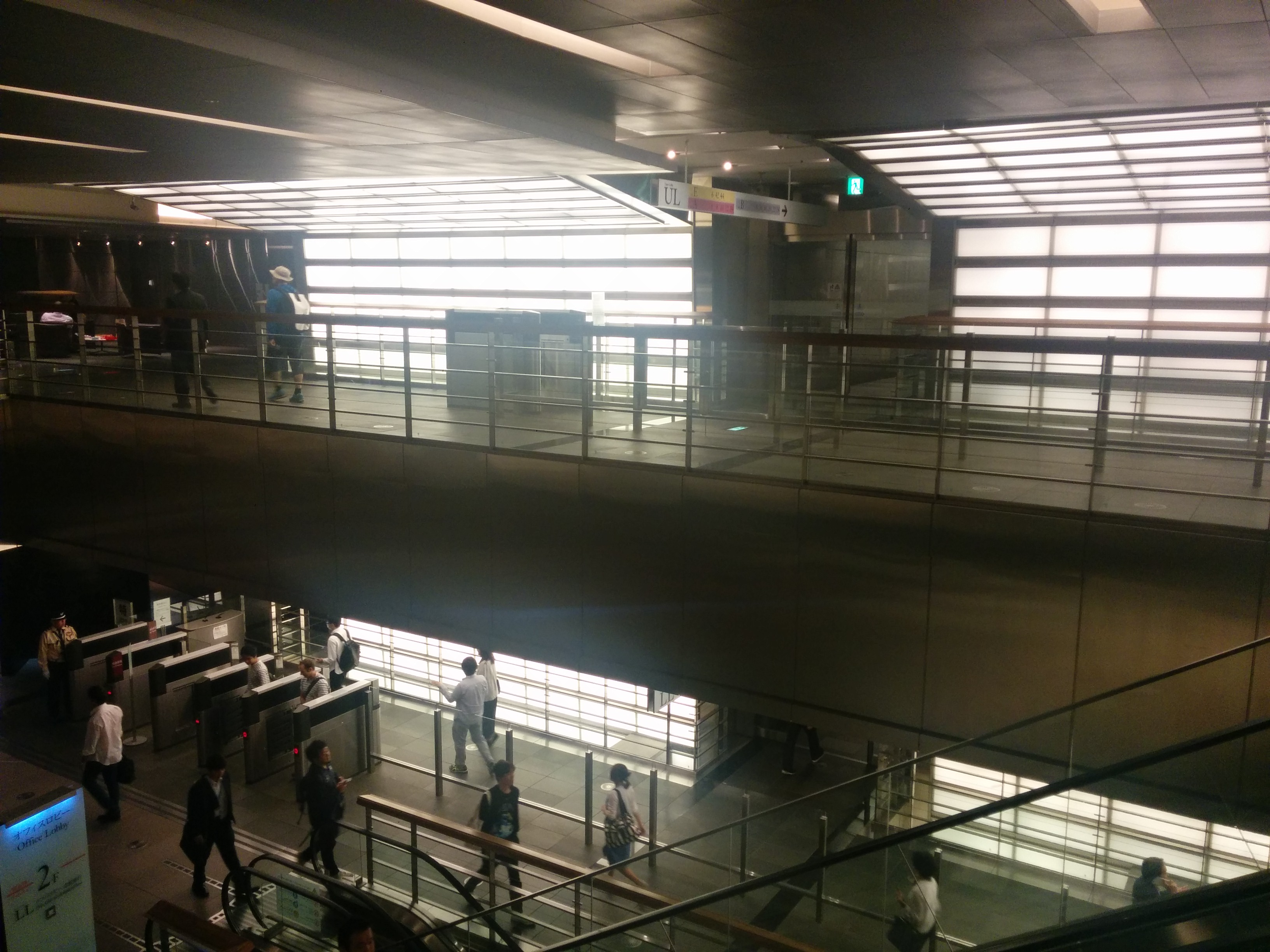
Double lobby ("lower lobby" and "upper lobby") to enter the elevators in Roppongi Hills Mori Tower

A double-deck elevator or double-deck lift is an elevator where one cab is stacked on top of another. This allows passengers on two consecutive floors to be able to use the elevator simultaneously, significantly increasing the passenger capacity of an elevator shaft. Such a scheme can improve efficiency in buildings where the volume of traffic would normally have a single-deck elevator stopping at every floor. For example, a passenger may board the lower deck (which serves only odd-numbered floors) at basement level while another passenger may board the upper deck (which serves even-numbered floors) on the ground floor—the cab serving even floors is on top of the cab serving odd floors.

Double-deck elevators occupy less building core space than traditional single-deck elevators do for the same level of traffic. In skyscrapers, this allows for much more efficient use of space as the floor area required by elevators is significant.

The other main technique for reducing the floor area occupied by elevators is shared-shaft elevators where multiple elevators use different sections of the same shaft to serve different floors with skylobbies separating the sections. The ThyssenKrupp TWIN elevator places two independent elevator cabs in one shaft and the ThyssenKrupp MULTI system places several elevator cabs in one shaft—each cab is equipped with its own, independent linear motor and can move vertically but also horizontally from one shaft to another. It is possible in some double deck elevators for the distance between the two cars to be adjusted to allow for different ceiling heights on each story of the building.

== Double-deck goods/passenger elevators ==
Not all double-deck elevators are used to transport passengers simultaneously in both decks. The second deck in a double-deck car may be used for the transportation of goods, typically outside of peak traffic periods. This technique has the advantages of preventing damage to interior fixtures due to impact from trolleys and not requiring a shaft dedicated to a goods-only elevator car. During peak periods, the elevator is used in passenger-only mode.

As of 2011, no triple-deck elevators have been built, although such a design had been considered for the 163-floor Burj Khalifa before the final design was scaled back to double-deck.
