= TK Elevator MULTI =

Cableless elevator developed by ThyssenKrupp

MULTI is a cable-less elevator developed by TK Elevator (formerly ThyssenKrupp Elevator). Rather than using cables to lift the elevator, MULTI uses linear motors built onto the cabin, the first of its kind. As well as moving vertically between floors of a building, MULTI can also move horizontally through a floor of a building. MULTI is being tested at Rottweil Test Tower.

== History ==
The system was installed inside a test tower in 2017. As of 2024, there are no installations outside of testing sites.
