= Equus Beds Aquifer =

The Equus Beds Aquifer is a distinct part the High Plains Aquifer System and is a principal municipal aquifer in south-central Kansas, underlying Hutchinson, McPherson, Newton, and Wichita.

While generally illustrated as an extension of the Miocene-Pliocene Ogallala Aquifer, this aquifer is composed of alternating beds of sand and clay mostly deposited in the later Pleistocene and was named the "McPherson Equus Beds" for having characteristic modern horse fossils.

The aquifer beds overlie, and are partially recharged by the Dakota Aquifer and certain Permian aquifers. These particular High Plains Aquifers are also known sources of widespread natural salt contamination, including portions of the Equus Beds, which can be aggravated by human extraction of water as well as by salt mining and oil wells.
