= Flora Manteola =

Argentine architect

- Born: Flora Manteola; August 12, 1936 (age 88); Cordoba, Argentina
- Occupation(s): Architect, academic
- Notable work: Prourban Building, Banco Municipal de la Ciudad de Buenos Aires

Flora Manteola (born August 12, 1936) is an Argentine architect. She is known for her works that focus on the reuse of buildings and educational projects. Manteola also teaches at the University of Buenos Aires.

== Biography ==
Manteola was born in 1936 in Cordoba, Argentina. She obtained her architecture degree at the University of Buenos Aires in 1962. Before finishing college, Manteola already founded an architectural studio called MSGSSS (Estudio Manteola, Sánchez Gómez, Santos, Solsona, Salaberry) together with fellow students that included Javier Sanchez Gomez. This studio would later complete various projects, which are noted for the emphasis on experimental and investigative design.

=== Works ===
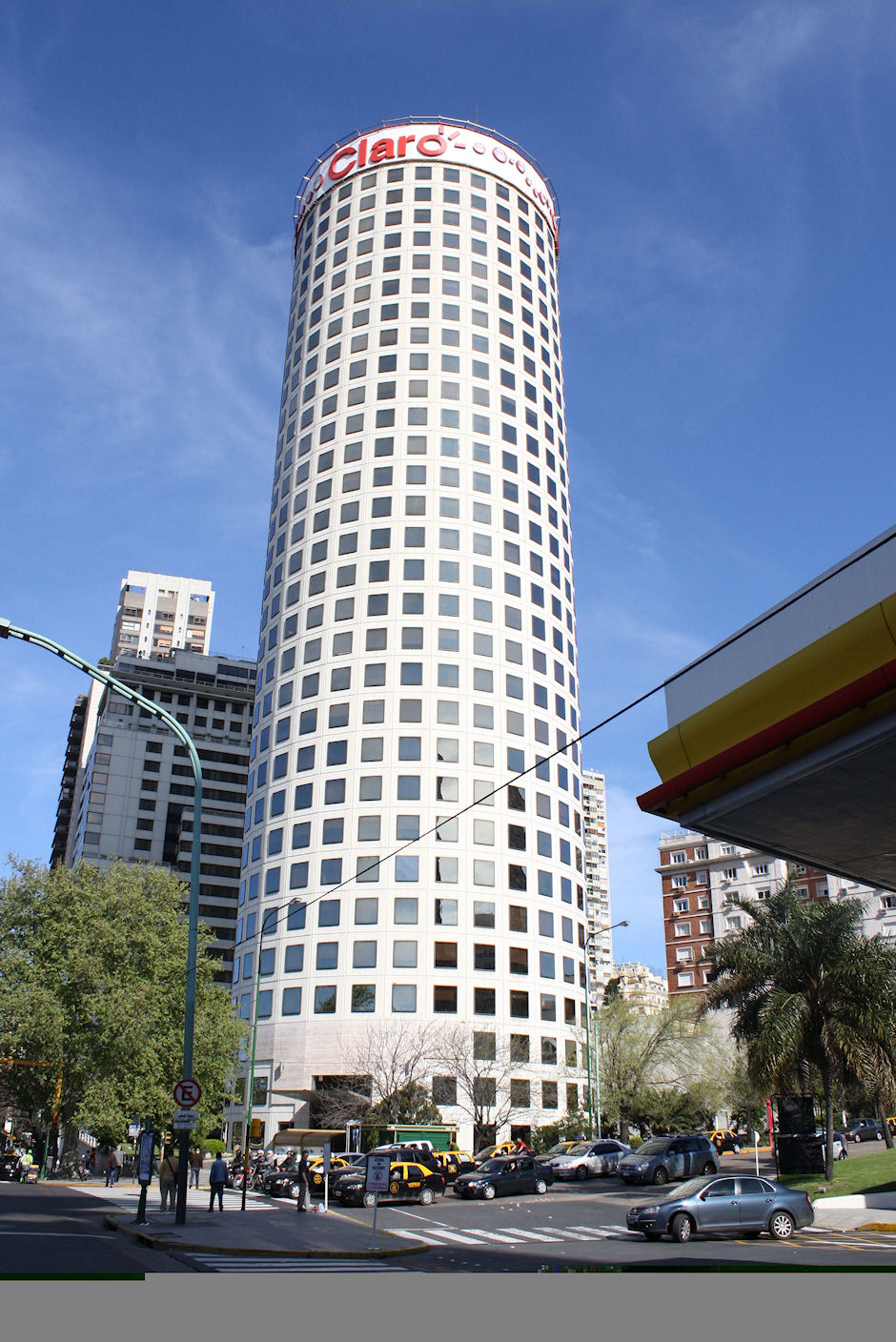
Prourban Building, Buenos Aires

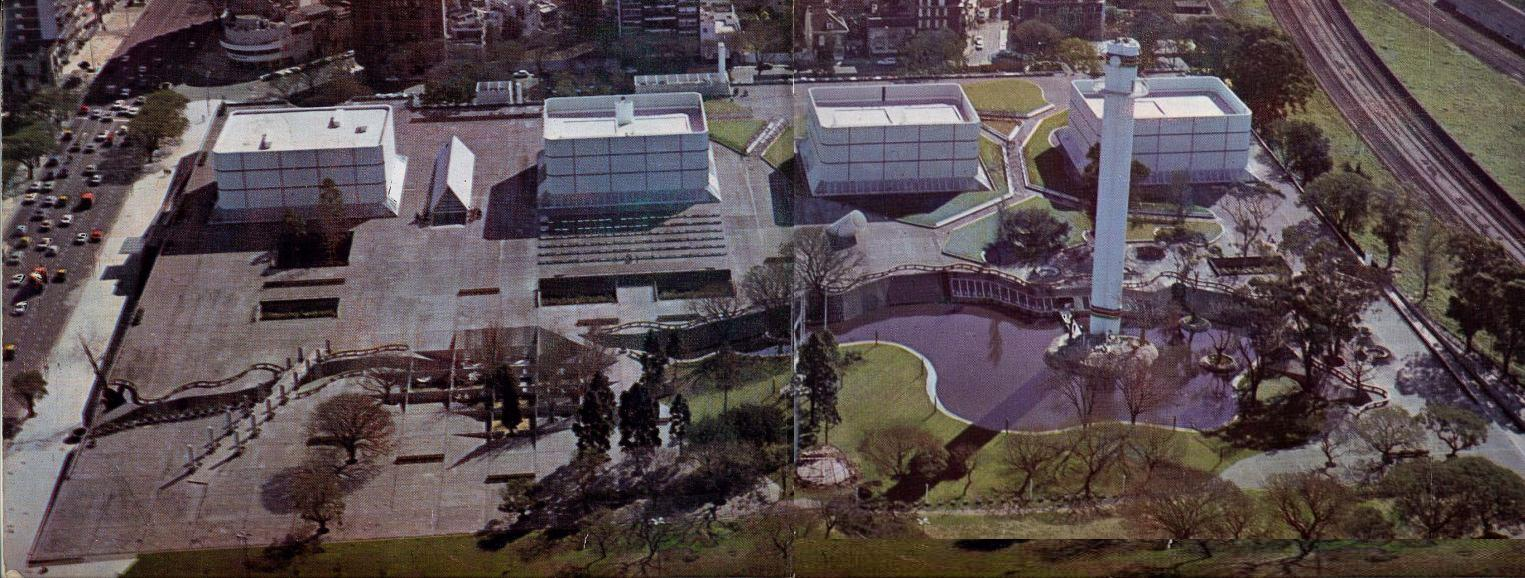
Argentina Televisora Color, Buenos Aires

Some of the architectural projects she was involved in include the Prourban building. It is a free-perimeter, cylindrical structure that became a landmark in Buenos Aires, where it is known as “El Rulero”. She was also one of the designers of the ATC Argentina Televisora Color, a building that explored the link between technology and landscape with the urban public space. She also led the team that designed Evoque Olazabal, a building noted for its curved shape. Her work on the Banco Municipal de la Ciudad de Buenos Aires is considered part the projects that represent the new generation of architectural design in Argentina.

Manteola is a tenured professor at the University of Buenos Aires and teaches Project Knowledge and Practice of the Common Basic Cycle of UBA. She also serves as the coordinator of the university’s Department of Design Disciplines.

Manteola was the Premio Konex for Architecture in 1992 for her works covering the 1982-1986 period. She was the first woman to receive the award. She was also the first woman to be awarded the Premio a la Trayectoria de la Sociedad Central de Architectos.
