= Hot Docs Ted Rogers Cinema =

Coordinates: 43.665485°N 79.410434°W

- The Hot Docs Ted Rogers Cinema in 2026

- Location of Hot Docs in Toronto
- Former names: 1941 (Midtown); 1967 (Capri); 1973 (Eden); 1979 (Bloor); 2012 (Bloor Hot Docs)

General information
- Type: Movie theatre
- Location: 506 Bloor Street West; Toronto, Ontario; M5S 1Y3
- Completed: 1941

Other information
- Seating capacity: 650
- Public transit: Bathurst station

The Hot Docs Ted Rogers Cinema (formerly the Bloor Cinema and the Bloor Hot Docs Cinema) is a movie theatre in the Annex district of downtown Toronto, Ontario, Canada, located on the 506 Bloor Street West, near its intersection with the Bathurst Street and the Bathurst subway station.

The venue serves as the primary home to the annual Hot Docs Canadian International Documentary Festival, as well as screening a regular theatrical lineup of documentary films throughout the year and serving as a venue for other smaller film festivals and cultural events.

In August 2025, it was announced that the theater was acquired by a local buyer.

== History ==
In 1913, the Madison Picture Palace (designed by J.A. Mackenzie) opened at this location. It was demolished in 1940 and rebuilt by Kaplan & Sprachman (Harold Solomon Kaplan and Abraham Sprachman) as the Midtown Theatre. It was renamed the Capri in 1967. In 1973, it became the Eden, showing adult films.

It became the Bloor in 1979 and returned to showing first-run films. One year later, it was sold, becoming an independent repertory-style theatre. It was sold to the Blue Ice Group in 2011 and to the Hot Docs Festival in 2016.

For a large part of recent history, the Bloor was a second-run theatre, showing movies that had already been in theatres, usually before they were released on video and DVD. It screened classic films, art films, and cult films; The Rocky Horror Picture Show was traditionally screened with a live cast on Halloween and on the last Friday of every month.

The Bloor Cinema was repeatedly selected as the best repertory cinema in Toronto by Eye Weekly. The theatre was independent and reopened after its renovation in 1999.

== Hot Docs ==
Although it was closed in 2010, the Bloor Cinema's owner turned away developers looking to replace the theatre. In 2011, it was sold to the Blue Ice Group which managed the cinema in partnership with the Hot Docs, where it was renovated and reopened under the moniker the Bloor Hot Docs Cinema in 2012. It is the main location for the Hot Docs, akin to the Toronto International Film Festival's Lightbox.

On June 23, 2016, it was announced that the Hot Docs had purchased the Bloor Cinema from the Blue Ice Group, using a CA$4 million gift from the Rogers Foundation, and that the cinema would be rebranded as the Hot Docs Ted Rogers Cinema.

In the wake of a staffing upheaval that had impacted the 2024 edition of the festival, the Hot Docs announced the temporary closure of the theatre for three months starting June 12 as a cost-cutting measure. The theatre reopened in September 2024 for third party rentals.

Hot Docs programming at the theatre resumed in December 2024. Hot Docs sought a new owner for the theatre and wanted to secure a lease-back arrangement, which is "part of its longer-term rebuilding strategy", according to a statement by the festival.

In 2025, the theatre was sold to an anonymous buyer for $6.25 million. Hot Docs continues to run the theatre.

== See also ==
- List of cinemas in Toronto
