= Revue Cinema =

Cinema in Toronto, Ontario, Canada

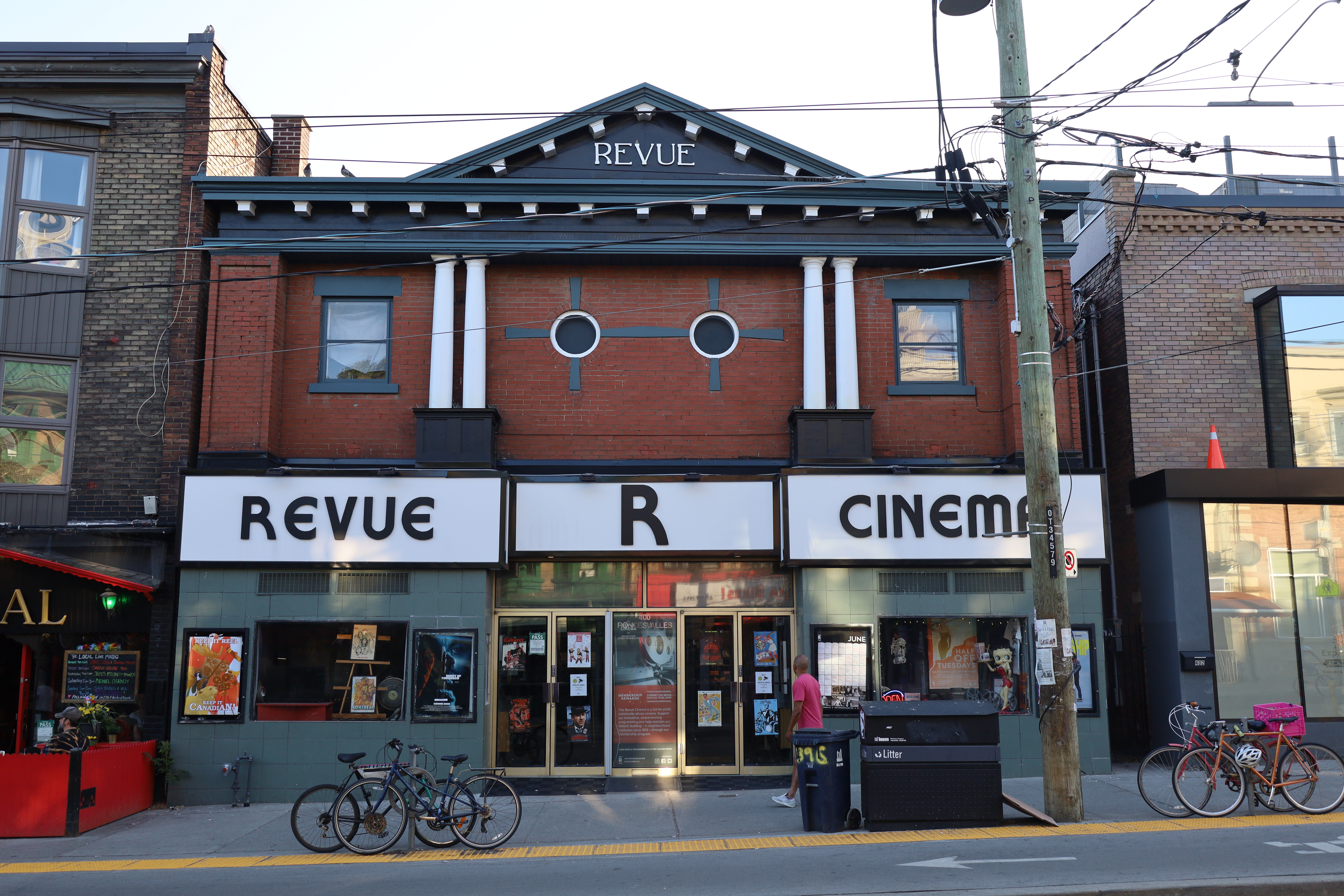
- The Revue Cinema in 2025

- Location of the Revue Cinema in Toronto
- Former names: Revue Theatre

General information
- Type: Cinema
- Location: 400 Roncesvalles Avenue, Toronto, Ontario, Canada
- Coordinates: 43.65109°N 79.45091°W
- Opened: 1912
- Cost: CA$5,000 (equivalent to $129,688 in 2025)
- Owner: Danny and Letty Mullin
- Operator: Revue Film Society

Design and construction
- Architect: Suburban Amusement Company Ltd.

Renovating team
- Architect: Kaplan & Sprachman

Other information
- Seating capacity: 236
- Public transit: TTC 504 King

Ontario Heritage Act
- Official name: 400 Roncesvalles Avenue (Revue Theatre)
- Designated: 2009

The Revue Cinema is a cinema in Toronto, Ontario, Canada. Built between late 1911 and early 1912, it is a designated heritage building and is Canada's oldest standing movie theatre in use for showing movies. Since 2007, it has been operated by the not-for-profit Revue Film Society.

== History ==
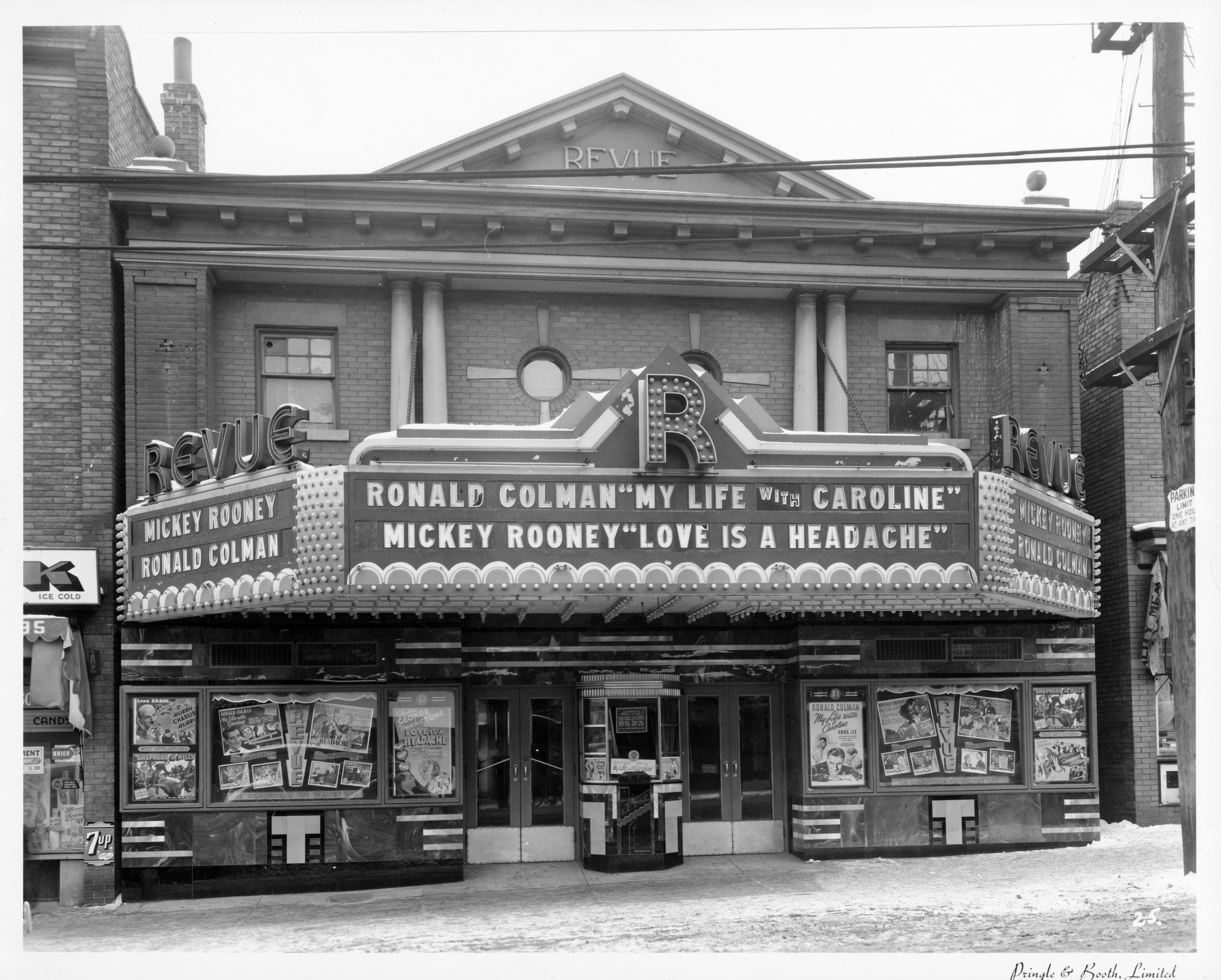
The Revue's exterior in 1941

The cinema was built between 1911 and 1912 by the Suburban Amusement Company at a cost of CA$5,000 (equivalent to $129,688 in 2025) The first owner was Jacob Smith. At the time, Roncesvalles Avenue was on the suburban western edge of the City of Toronto. The area was being developed intensively and the local population was increasing. There was some concern in the neighbourhood and the school board about opening a theatre so close to Howard Park School, but the development was approved. First known as the Revue Theatre, the cinema was successful and operated as a first-run theatre from its opening date until 1972 when it became a repertory cinema.

Starting in 1925, the High Park and Alhambra Presbyterian Church rented the Revue on Sundays (when it was closed due to 'blue' laws) for worship.

The theatre was equipped for sound movies in 1929. A renovation was done in 1936, adding an Art Deco style marquee, and 543 seats, by the architects Abraham Sprachman and Harold Kaplan, who specialized in cinemas at the time.

Under the management of Bruce Pittman and Fraser Boa, the Revue was refurbished and reopened as the Revue Cinema on the July 1, 1972 holiday with a special "Nickel Day" program showing Errol Flynn in Captain Blood and Judy Garland in A Star Is Born. The following day, the Revue began a Marlon Brando festival.

In the 1980s, the Revue became part of the Festival Theatres chain of repertory cinemas in Toronto, which also included the Fox, Royal and Kingsway theatres. In 2004, the Festival Theatres founder died, and in April 2006, the founder's family announced their intentions to close all of the theatres except the Fox. The family found it financially impossible to continue due to the rise of DVDs and the shorter period of public exhibition of films available to repertory cinemas. The last show of the Festival era was on June 30, 2006, showing Lawrence of Arabia.

When news of the Revue's closure became public, a grassroots community movement sprang up in order to save the cinema. The movement founded the Revue Film Society to explore ways to re-open the cinema for film showing. The building's owners put the building up for sale, with the intent to sell to new owners prepared to re-open the cinema.

While the theatre was shut, the marquee, known for its tendency to hold water and snow, collapsed on February 19, 2007, most likely due to the weight of a recent snowfall. Portions of the marquee were placed in storage for eventual restoration.

The movement to save the cinema was ultimately successful. On June 12, 2007, a press conference was held in front of the Revue Cinema, announcing the purchase of the Revue by local residents Danny and Letty Mullin. The Mullins lease the Revue building to the Revue Film Society to operate. The cinema re-opened on October 4, 2007, with a screening of Some Like It Hot.

The lease was set to expire on June 30, 2024, and Danny Mullin did not extend it. There had been disagreements with him and the board over the way the theatre is managed and maintained. The Mullins believed that the operation of the theatre should be a for-profit initiative, instead of a non-profit. They also wanted the board to have exterior maintenance done, an ongoing sore point between the Mullins and the board. The board sought an emergency court injunction to get the lease extended, which was granted on June 28, 2024. The Revue Film Society said the theatre would continue to operate normally until further notice. Filmmaker Guillermo del Toro called on Toronto mayor Olivia Chow to help save the theatre. In September 2024, Grant Oyston, the Revue Film Society Chair, announced that a five-year lease agreement with the Mullins was signed by his group.

Del Toro, a part-time Toronto resident who has called himself a passionate fan of the venue, subsequently announced a special fundraising screening of his 2015 film Crimson Peak at the Revue on October 3, 2024, to help fund renovation efforts. Substantial façade restoration work was completed by the Revue Film Society in 2024.

At the Toronto Film Critics Association Awards 2024, the Revue Film Society were awarded a Special Citation for their efforts throughout the year to protect and save the venue.

== Heritage designation ==
Revue Cinema auditorium in 1941
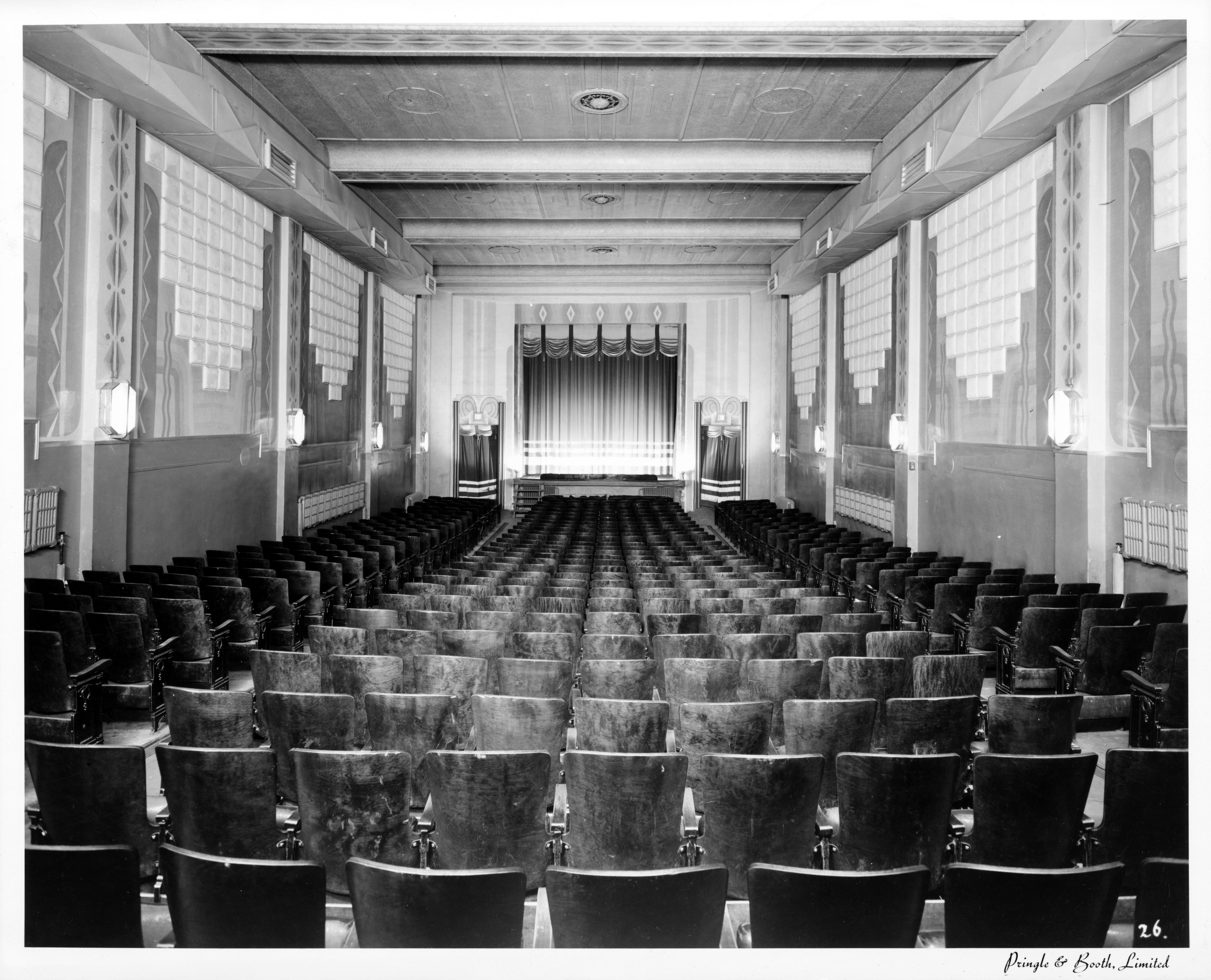
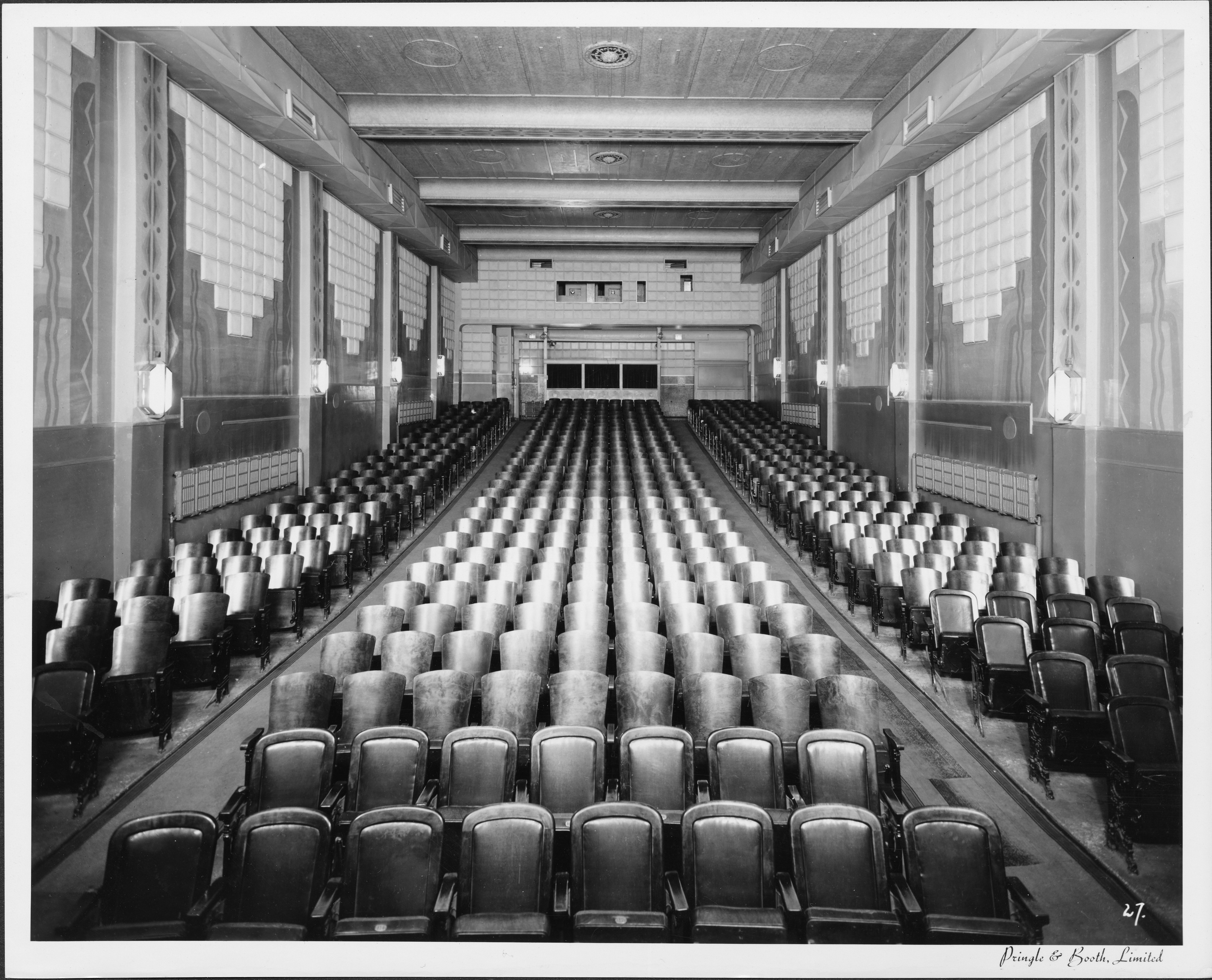

The property was designated under Part IV of the Ontario Heritage Act in 2009. The designation reads in part: "The cultural heritage value of the Revue Theatre is related to the building's design or physical value as a representative example of a World War I era theatre with features of Edwardian Classicism. The style developed after 1900 and represented a return to restrained Classical detailing that was popular for all building types during the subsequent decades."

== See also ==
- List of cinemas in Toronto
- Roncesvalles, Toronto
- Cinema of Canada
