= ByTowne Cinema =

One-screen repertory movie theatre in Ottawa, Ontario, Canada

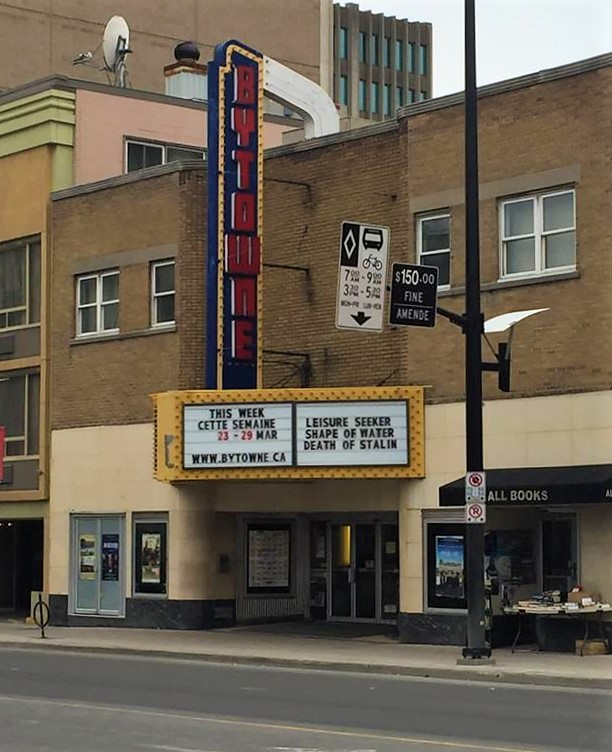
- Interactive map of ByTowne Cinema
- Former names: Nelson Theatre
- Address: 325 Rideau Street; Ottawa, Ontario; K1N 5Y4
- Coordinates: 45°25′47″N 75°41′05″W
- Operator: Daniel Demois and Andy Willick
- Capacity: 650
- Type: Cinema
- Event: Repertory

Construction
- Built: 1946
- Opened: 10 February 1947
- Renovated: 1960s, 1990s, 2000, 2011, 2013
- Architect: Kaplan & Sprachman

Website
- www.bytowne.ca

The ByTowne Cinema is a one-screen repertory movie theatre located in Ottawa, Ontario, The cinema is one of Ottawa's main venues for independent and foreign films. The 650-seat cinema is located on Rideau Street at Nelson, several blocks east of the Rideau Centre. It was closed on December 24, 2020, with a final week of screenings shown on February 26 to March 7, 2021. The cinema reopened under new ownership on September 8, 2021.

== History ==
The one-screen cinema was built by Hyman Berlin throughout the fall and winter of 1946; it opened on February 10, 1947 as the Nelson Theatre.

=== ByTowne's origins ===
The ByTowne Cinema was not always called as such and was not always located on Rideau St.

==== 1968–1989: The Towne Cinema ====
Located on 5 Beachwood Avenue, in the New Edinburgh district of Ottawa, the theatre was built in 1947 under the name the Linden Theatre.

In 1968, the theatre was renamed to the Towne Cinema and was operated by Germain Cadieux (father of actress Anne-Marie Cadieux). Since 1973, it was best known as one of Ottawa's first repertory cinemas, showing cult and classic productions, foreign and independent films. At the time, this unique and distinct format was new to Ontario cinemas. The Towne also became "Ottawa's alternative movie house".

After many successful years of operation, the Towne Cinema closed in June 1989 and was renovated into retail space.

==== 1947–1988: The Nelson Theatre ====
Opened in 1947 on Rideau St., the Nelson was one of the city's leading cinemas for decades. Admission was 25 cents for general seating and 35 cents for the upper loge. Two years, Berlin leased the Nelson to the Famous Players chain of cinemas.

During the time of Famous Players' lease, they advertised the available air conditioning with a huge banner that was suspended from the marquee.

In 1988, Famous Players was no longer interested in running a single-screen cinema. Subsequently, the cinema was periodically closed when the chain moved to multiplexes. The Berlin family sold the cinema to the operators of the Towne Cinema.

===== Name origins =====
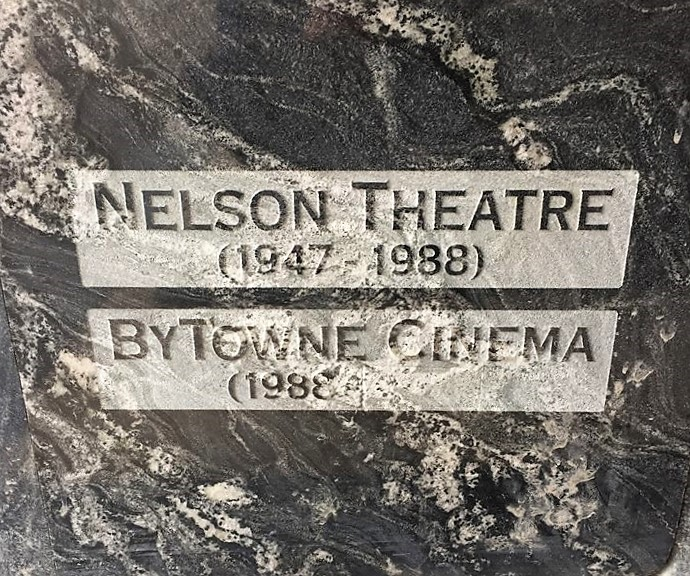
Stone engraving on the wall of the entrance at the ByTowne Cinema

Nelson Theatre was the original name at the time of opening. It is a logical name, since it is located on the corner of Rideau St. and Nelson St.

However, the name was actually selected by Mrs. J.H. Goyette through a naming contest. This contest received more than 4,000 suggestions and Mrs. J.H Goyette won a $100 cash prize.

==== 1988–2020, 2021–: The ByTowne Cinema ====
On October 1, 1988, Bruce White and Jean Cloutier reopened the cinema, renamed the ByTowne, in honour of Bytown, Ottawa's original name until January 1, 1855, and because it was the second cinema for the owners of the Towne Cinema on Beachwood Avenue. The ByTowne Cinema began showing alternative and repertory films, with different films each day.

On December 4, 2020, White announced that the ByTowne Cinema would permanently close as of Dec. 31, 2020, due in part to losses incurred during the ongoing COVID-19 pandemic.

The cinema was sold to new owners Daniel Demois and Andy Willick from Toronto, who reopened it under the same name on September 8, 2021.

==== Timeline of theatre operations ====
Beechwood Avenue

- The Linden Theatre (1947–1968)
- The Towne Cinema (1968–1989)

Rideau Street

- The Nelson Theatre (1947–1988)
- The ByTowne Cinema (1988–2020)
- The ByTowne Cinema (2021–present)

=== Ownership ===
Beginning at the Towne Cinema, Jean Cloutier, who was an usher, was asked to become a manager by the former operator of the Towne. Also, Bruce White began as a graphic designer for the Towne Cinema's programme. In 1983, Cadieux sold the Towne Cinema to Jean Cloutier and Bruce White.

In 1988, Bruce White and Jean Cloutier bought the Nelson Theatre for $790,000. Similar to the Towne Cinema, the pair transformed the Nelson into a repertory cinema, under the name ByTowne Cinema.

The Towne and the ByTowne operated simultaneously for 9 months, with slightly different programs. In June 1989, White moved the entire operation to the ByTowne and closed the Towne Cinema.

After the ByTowne cinema was closed in December 2020, it was sold to new owners Daniel Demois and Andy Willick, who reopened it under the same name in September 2021.

=== Renovations ===
The cinema was built in 1946 by the prolific architects Harold Kaplan and Abraham Sprachman.

The last existing original theatre marquee in the Ottawa-Hull area.

From 1947 onward, the ByTowne made many improvements and renovations: the screen and projection, completely renovated the washrooms and installed new seats with more legroom.

The theatre was renovated in the early sixties to add wider and plusher seats, reducing its seating capacity from 940 to 770. Likewise, 70 mm projection facilities, along with new sound systems and wider screens were installed.

The cinema was renovated again in 2000 and 175 old ByTowne seats were replaced. One hundred and fifty "airline-style" seats were salvaged from the recently closed Capitol Square multiplex on Queen Street. When those seats were installed in the 1980s, they were known as "the best seats in town", equipped with high backs and cupholders. The seating in the ByTowne Cinema was reduced to 670 and the renovations cost $30,000. On March 25, 2000, in order to pay for the renovations, a garage sale was held by the ByTowne Cinema. Movie posters, CDs, and film reels were offered as sale items.

In the fall of 2011, the cinema installed a Christie digital projector, although its two 35mm projectors remained operational. In May 2013, the ByTowne renovated its auditorium. The ground level seats were replaced with 435 new Greystone "Madrid" chairs. The total number of seating was reduced to 650.

== Showings ==
=== Hollywood hits ===
"El Cid", "2001: A Space Odyssey" and "The Exorcist", made their debut at the cinema. Later on, the cinema hosted big box-office bestsellers such as "Jaws", "Raiders Of The Lost Ark", "Star Trek", as well as some of their sequels.

Other popular films displayed at the cinema, but not limited to:

- 12 Years A Slave
- The Adventures of Tintin
- Ferdinand
- Gone Girl
- The Help
- La La Land
- The Perks of Being A Wallflower
- Jesus Christ Vampire Hunter

==== Musicals ====
"The Sound Of Music", showed for a long period in 1965, is amongst some of the previously shown musicals. Subsequently, many other notable musicals, like "Funny Girl" and "Willy Wonka& the Chocolate Factory" were screened.

=== Independent and foreign films ===
The ByTowne is best known for showing a wide variety of independent, "non-mainstream", cult and international films.

- An African Election
- Ai Weiwei: Never Sorry
- Les Femmes du 6e étage
- Habemus Papam (We Have A Pope)
- Happiness
- The Insult
- Kandahar Journals
- Patang (The Kite)
- Throne Of Blood

==== 2017: The Breadwinner ====
On September 22, 2017, the ByTowne Cinema hosted a red carpet screening of "The Breadwinner". This film screening was a part of the Ottawa International Animation Festival.

== Threat to Canadian repertory cinemas ==
Repertory cinemas, such as the ByTowne and Mayfair Theatre, show Canadian and foreign films that other major chains will not. However, over the past years, repertory theatres have been having financial difficulties. Especially with the new rules set by Hollywood distributors, it is even harder for repertory cinemas to sustain. For example, Buena Vista Pictures prohibits the showings of Disney films for family matinees in repertory theatres.

The ByTowne Cinema produced most of their profit on Canadian and independent foreign films. Owner Bruce White explained, "we book most of our films from distributors that are Canadian owned. This is not to say that we never do business with the Americans, but the extra grief that they generate is inversely proportionate to the amount of business that we do". White also added that "Disney isn't worth the hassle" and trying to change the minds of the big companies is pointless.

The ongoing public health restrictions during the COVID-19 pandemic saw the cinema face a series of temporary closures and reductions of available seating over the course of 2020. These challenges, alongside a decline in viewership during the pandemic, contributed to the cinema's temporary closure at the end of 2020.

== See also ==
- List of Ottawa-Gatineau cinemas
- Revival house
