= Moderne architecture =

Architectural style

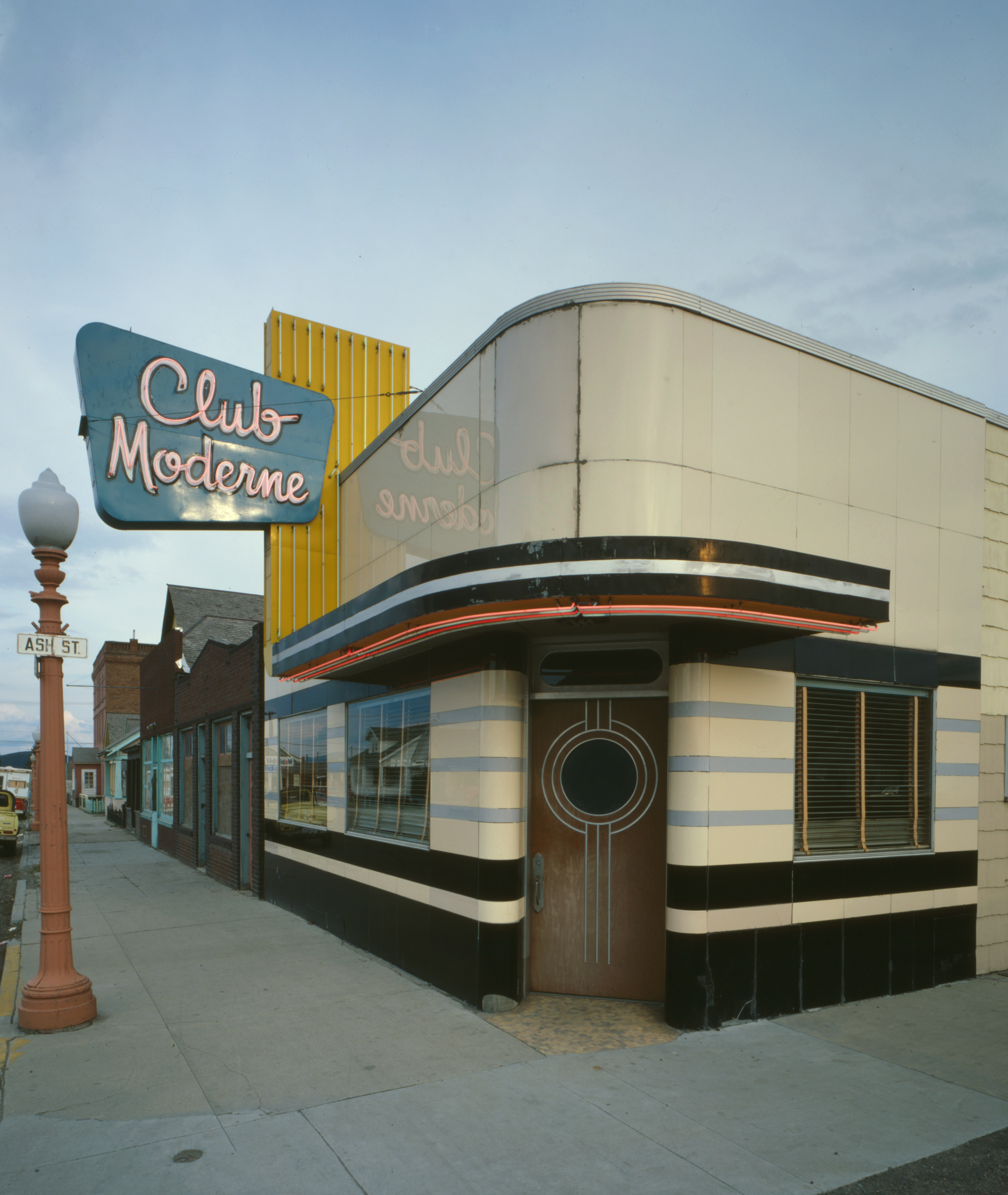
Club Moderne, Anaconda, Montana. Designed by Fred F. Willson, 1937.

Moderne architecture, also sometimes referred to as Style Moderne, Art Moderne, or simply Moderne, Jazz Age Moderne, jazz modern or Jazz Style, describes certain styles of architecture popular from 1925 through the 1940s. It is closely related to Art Deco.

== Art Deco and Moderne architecture: terms and evolution ==
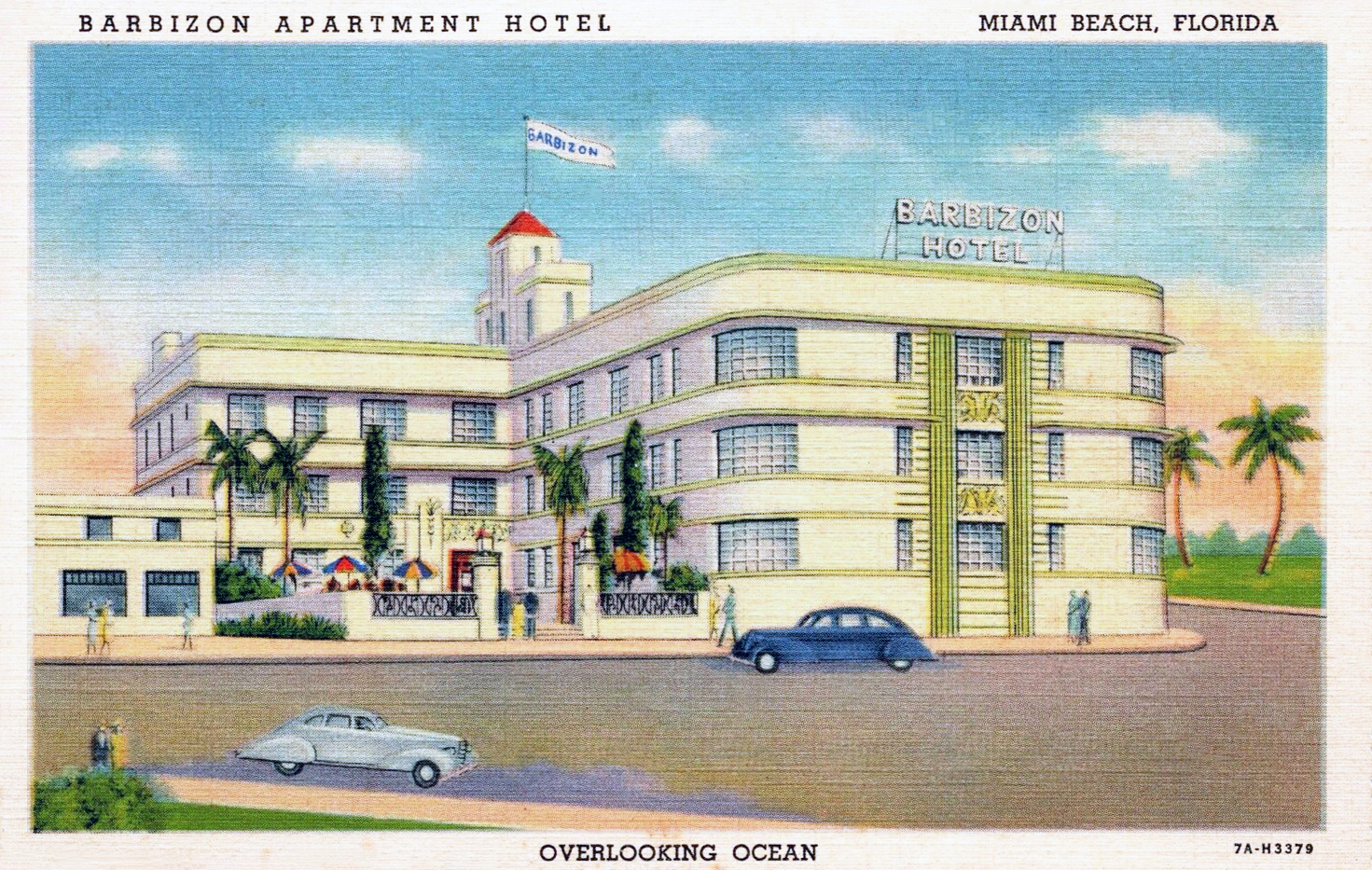
Barbizon Apartment Hotel, Miami Beach, Florida, on a 1937 postcard

The terminology is not very firm; during the time when the styles were used, they were simply known as Moderne. A distinction between subtypes was later introduced by David Gebhard: Zigzag, Streamline, and PWA (Public Works Administration) Moderne. The term Art Deco was only popularized by Bevis Hillier in 1968 and then used quite indiscriminately, and therefore some researchers prefer to use it only for the decorative forms and, when referring to architecture, only for the highly ornamented buildings of the late 1920s.

Originating in the International Exhibition of Modern Decorative and Industrial Arts held in Paris in 1925, the style has expression in styles traditionally classified as Art Deco, Streamline Moderne, Late Moderne, and, in the U.S., PWA/Classical Moderne. Architectural historian Richard Guy Wilson characterized the style by the eclectic co-existence of "traditionalism and modernism".

Art Moderne, with its novel streamline character, also manifested itself in the design of cars, planes and ships. It does sometimes overlap with Art Deco in the design of certain buildings, but it has a horizontal emphasis, as opposed to the vertical emphasis of Art Deco.

== Characteristics ==
In a nutshell:

- Emphasis is on the horizontal, as opposed to Art Deco's vertical emphasis
- Wall surfaces: smooth, often made of stucco, rounded
- Roof: flat, roofline has small ledge
- Wall decoration: horizontal grooves or lines; can be fluted or made of pressed metal
- Façade: asymmetrical
- Windows:
  - Horizontal arrangement
  - Casement, corner, or ribbon windows
  - Glass block (aka glass brick) windows; can be curved, as part of curved wall
- Metal balustrades

Both Art Deco, which slightly predates it, and Moderne style belong to the Modern Movement and may be referred to as "Modernistic". They both renounced the aesthetic repertoire of the past, share a number of design elements, but are distinctly different in their appearance.

Art Moderne houses are easily identifiable due to their distinctive streamlined and simple outlines, which may however hide a considerable amount of thought. The Moderne style of the 1930s did away with Art Deco's specific geometrical ornamentation including chevrons and zigzags, and adopted a less ornamented style. An important influence was the development of aerodynamics in the design of land, water and air vehicles, translated by the Moderne style in the use of more streamlined volumes and rounded corners. Both styles employ smooth wall surfaces, but Art Moderne houses make do with little surface ornamentation, mostly using simple, smoothly finished white stucco. Moderne structures' horizontal emphasis is reflected in their bands of windows and flat roofs, while Art Deco buildings include strong vertical elements. Houses of both styles may share asymmetrically grouped volumes, flat roofs with parapets, and porthole windows, but the Moderne outline will stay grounded and suggest a horizontal flowing movement, while Art Deco will always employ some vertical elements, be it windows, fins or other details at the entrance or at the apex of proeminent volumes etc. Art Moderne, on the other hand, bears a slight resemblance to the International Style.

Art Moderne buildings are usually monochromatic. They may use curved glass surfaces, for which glass blocks are well suited. Some Moderne buildings have simple steel pipe railings - an element borrowed from contemporary ship design -, curved canopies, and may use aluminum and stainless steel for window and door trims.

Common building types include public, commercial, office and apartment buildings, theaters, gas stations, and residential houses

== Streamline Moderne ==
Some later Moderne architecture from the 1930s and 40s may be classified as Streamline Moderne, characterized by a then-modern "Machine Age" aerodynamic design, displaying rounded corners, stucco surfaces, horizontal banding, window groupings, and elements projecting outwards beyond the portion below (overhangs). It is an evolution of Art Deco architecture, which peaked in popularity c. 1937. This can refer to land-based architecture, such as the Normandie Hotel in San Juan, Puerto Rico, which show curved, shiplike forms and styling. This follows the water-based adaptation of Art Deco decorative style and architecture to passenger ships, such as the SS Normandie. Other Streamline Moderne architecture does not reflect any maritime-oriented themes.

== Canada ==
The architectural firm of Kaplan & Sprachman introduced the Moderne style of architecture to Canada, designing many movie theatres in that style. The Eglinton Theatre in Toronto and the Vogue Theatre in Vancouver, both designed by Kaplan & Sprachman, as well as the Odeon Theatre in Victoria, designed by Henry Simmonds, are still standing and have been designated historical landmarks.

== United States ==
The Moderne style of architecture appears as a descriptor in documentation of many buildings listed by the United States of America's National Register of Historic Places.

The Moderne style was popular for a comparatively short time, and in regard to large commercial buildings was soon replaced by the International Style. Examples are rather rare in the United States, with commercial or public Moderne buildings surviving in larger numbers than single residential houses.

Extant Art Deco and Art Moderne residential houses, often unaltered, date to the 1920s, 30s and 40s, since there has been no significant revival of the two styles.
