= Mińsk =

Mińsk may refer to:

- Minsk, capital city of Belarus, known in Polish as Mińsk, formerly also as Mińsk Litewski or Mińsk Białoruski
- Mińsk Mazowiecki, a town in eastern Poland

== See also ==
- Minsk (disambiguation)
