= Temple Adath Israel (Cleveland, Mississippi) =

Historic Reform synagogue in Mississippi, US

Adath Israel Temple
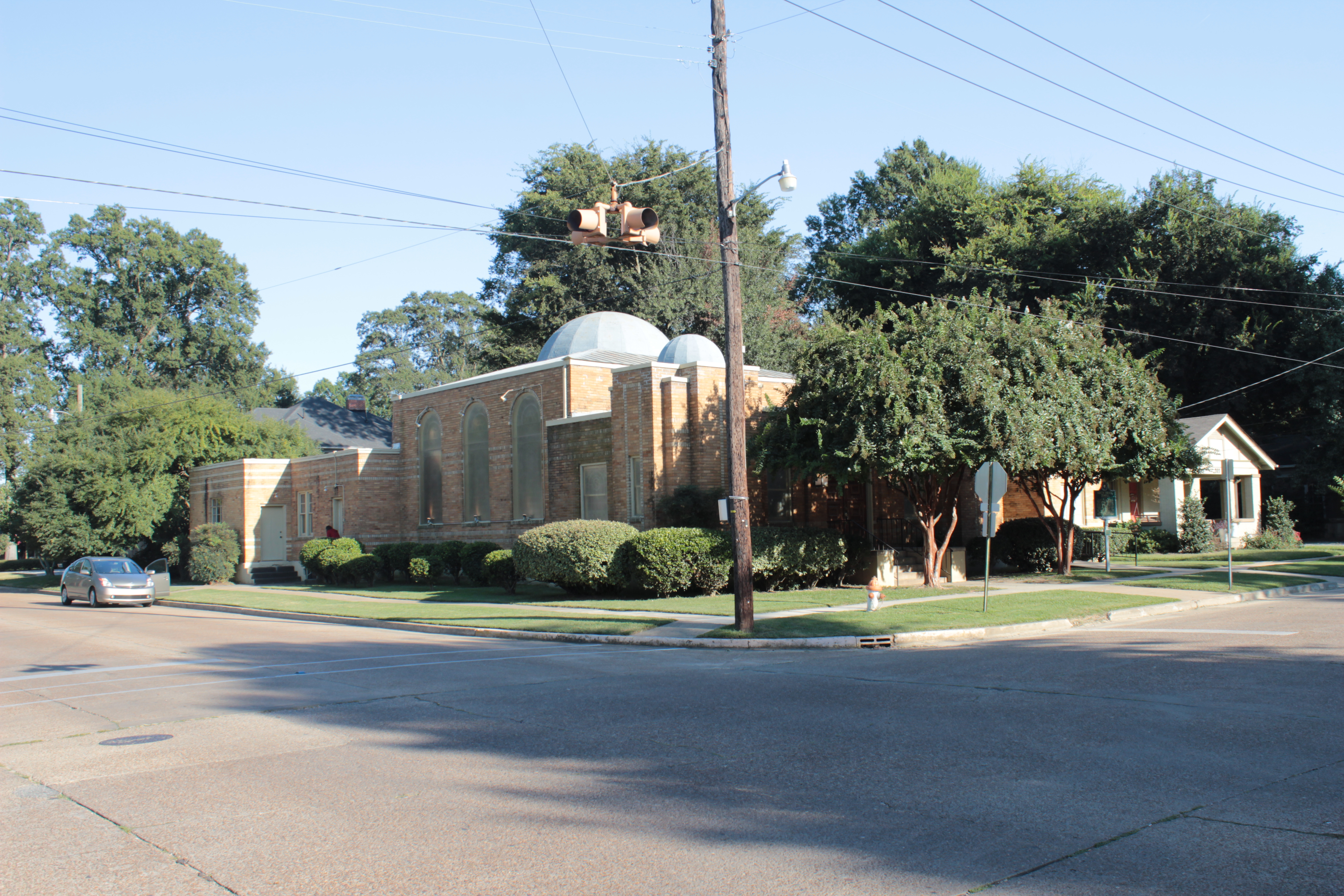

- Location in Mississippi

Religion
- Affiliation: Reform Judaism
- Ecclesiastical or organizational status: Synagogue
- Status: Active

Location
- Location: 201 South Bolivar Avenue, Cleveland, Mississippi
- Country: United States
- Interactive map of Adath Israel Temple
- Coordinates: 33°44′35″N 90°43′29″W

Architecture
- Architect: Harold Kaplan (1950 annex)
- Type: Synagogue
- Style: Byzantine Revival
- Established: 1923 (as a congregation)
- Completed: 1927
- Adath Israel Temple
- U.S. National Register of Historic Places
- NRHP reference No.: 02001499
- Added to NRHP: December 12, 2002

Temple Adath Israel is an historical Reform Jewish synagogue located at 201 South Bolivar Avenue, in Cleveland, Mississippi, in the United States.

The congregation was organized in 1923; a Hebrew school had been started the previous year. The congregation's Byzantine Revival synagogue was built in 1927. An annex, designed by architect Harold Kaplan of Greenville, Mississippi was completed in 1949–1950.

The Temple was listed on the National Register of Historic Places on December 12, 2002.

== History ==
Plans for an organized Jewish community around Cleveland began in 1922, when three members of the community decided to create a Hebrew school for Bolivar County. Working with a Rabbi out of Greenville, Mississippi, they held classes in the Cleveland Consolidated School. This developed into a desire for religious services for Jews within a 50-mile radius of Cleveland. Services were originally held in a local high school auditorium, with Rabbi Rabinowitz from Greenville coming up to lead services. Between 1926 and 1927, congregants raised money to build a synagogue. The Temple was dedicated on February 6, 1927.

At one point, Adath Israel had one of the largest temple youth groups in Mississippi.

As of September 2023, Temple Adath Israel had a congregation of about 18–22 families.

== Gallery ==
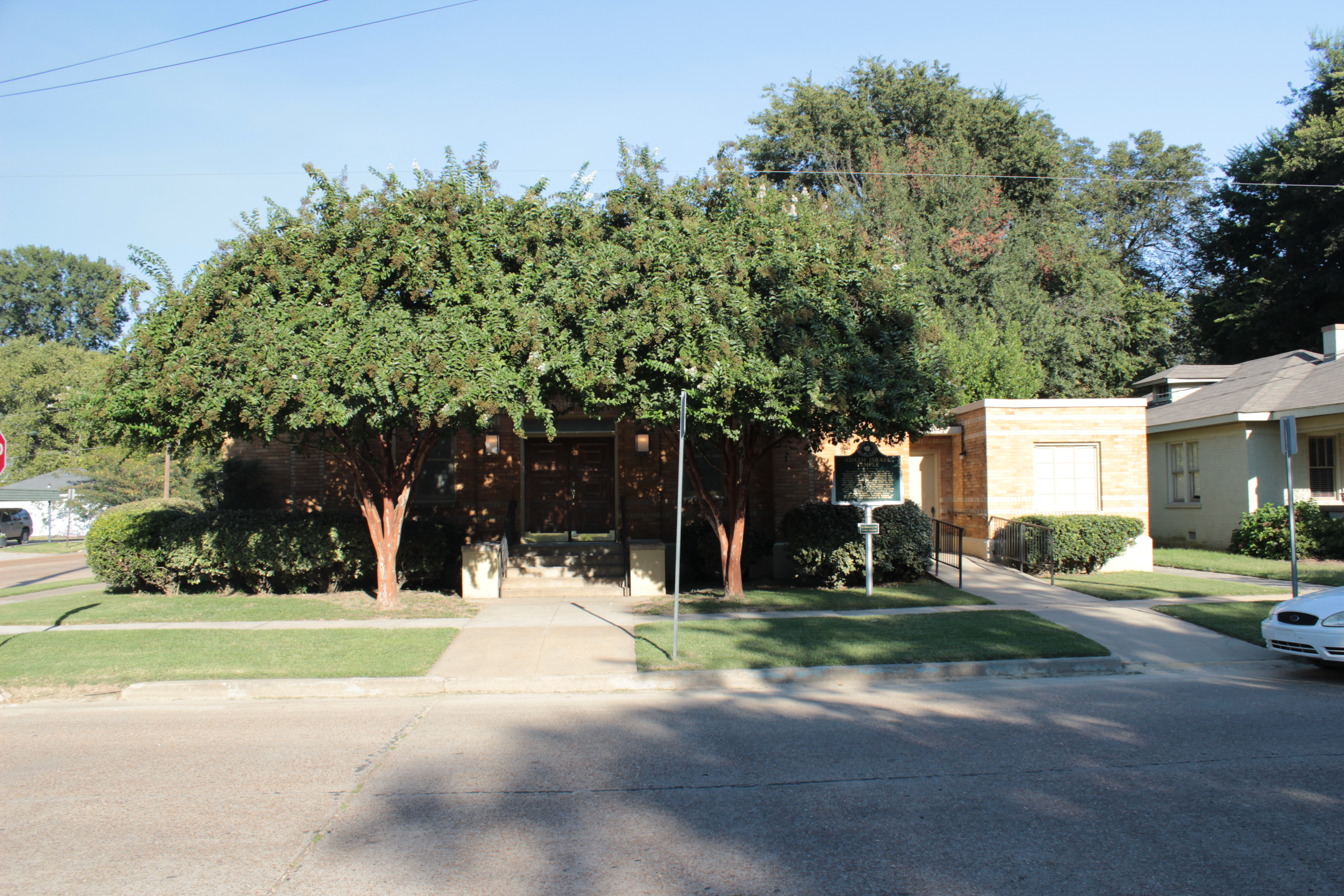
Front of the building

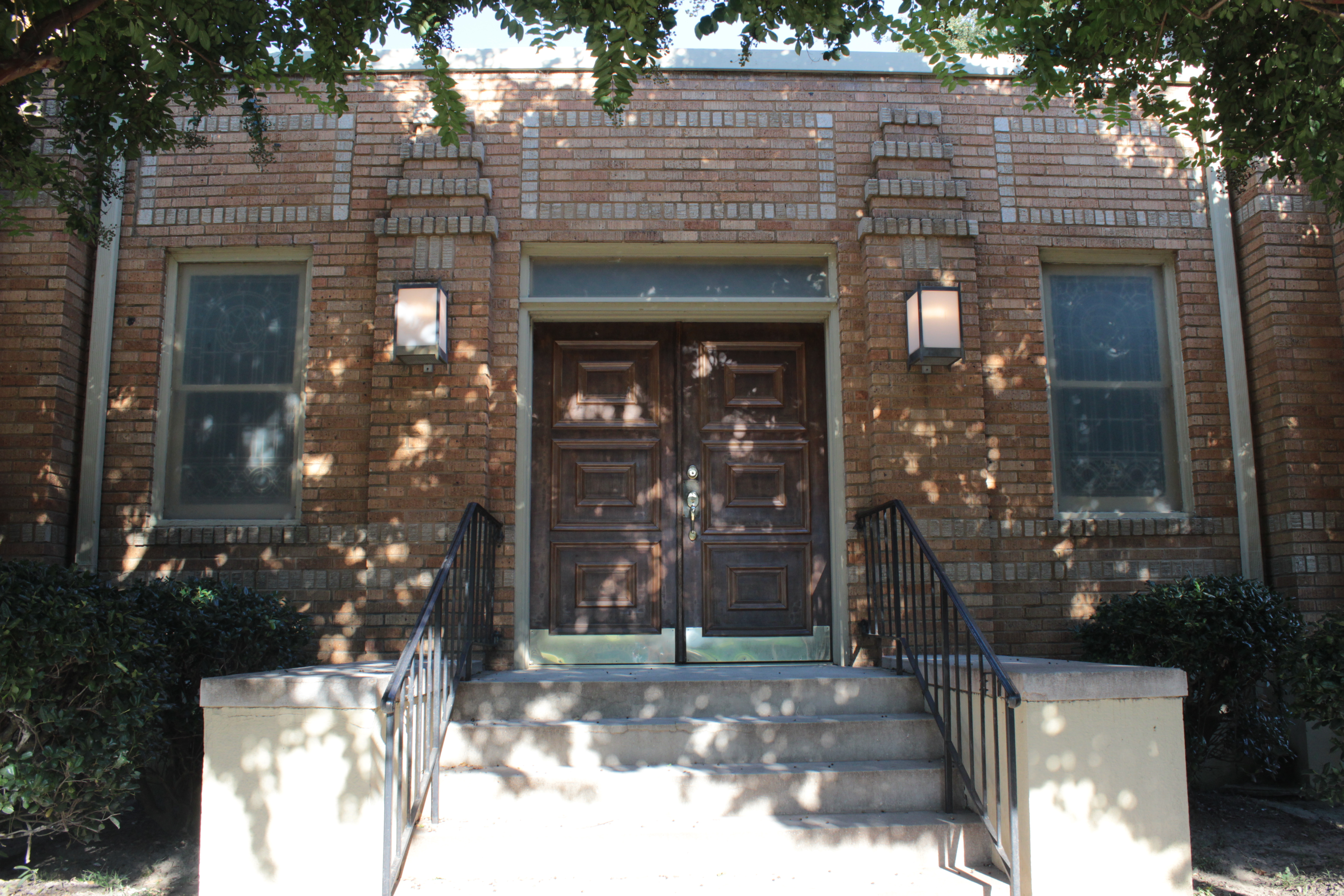
Closeup of the entrance
