= Fox Theatre (Toronto) =

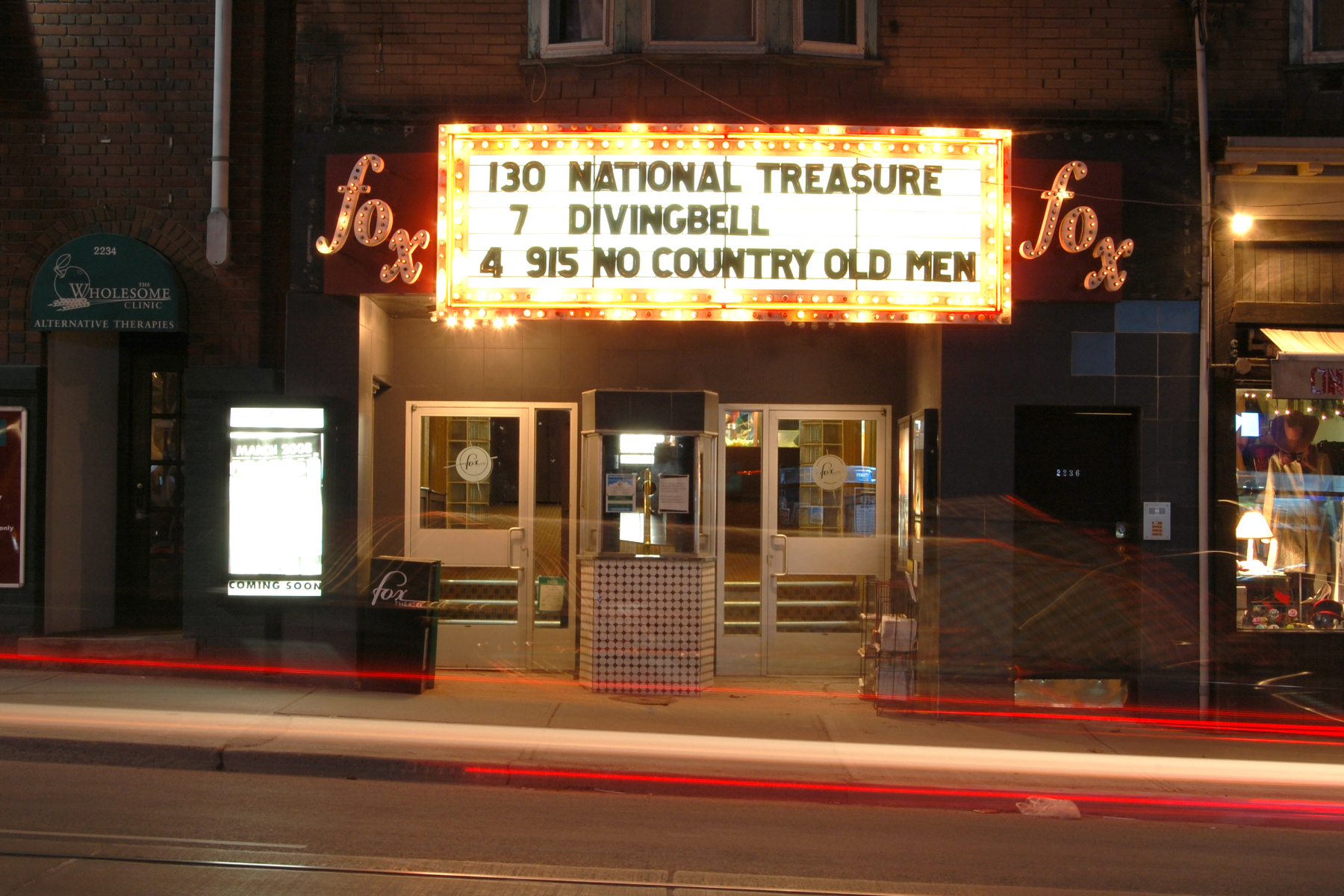

- Location of Fox in Toronto

General information
- Type: Cinema
- Location: 2236 Queen Street East, Toronto, Ontario, Canada
- Coordinates: 43.672853°N 79.287311°W

Website
- foxtheatre.ca

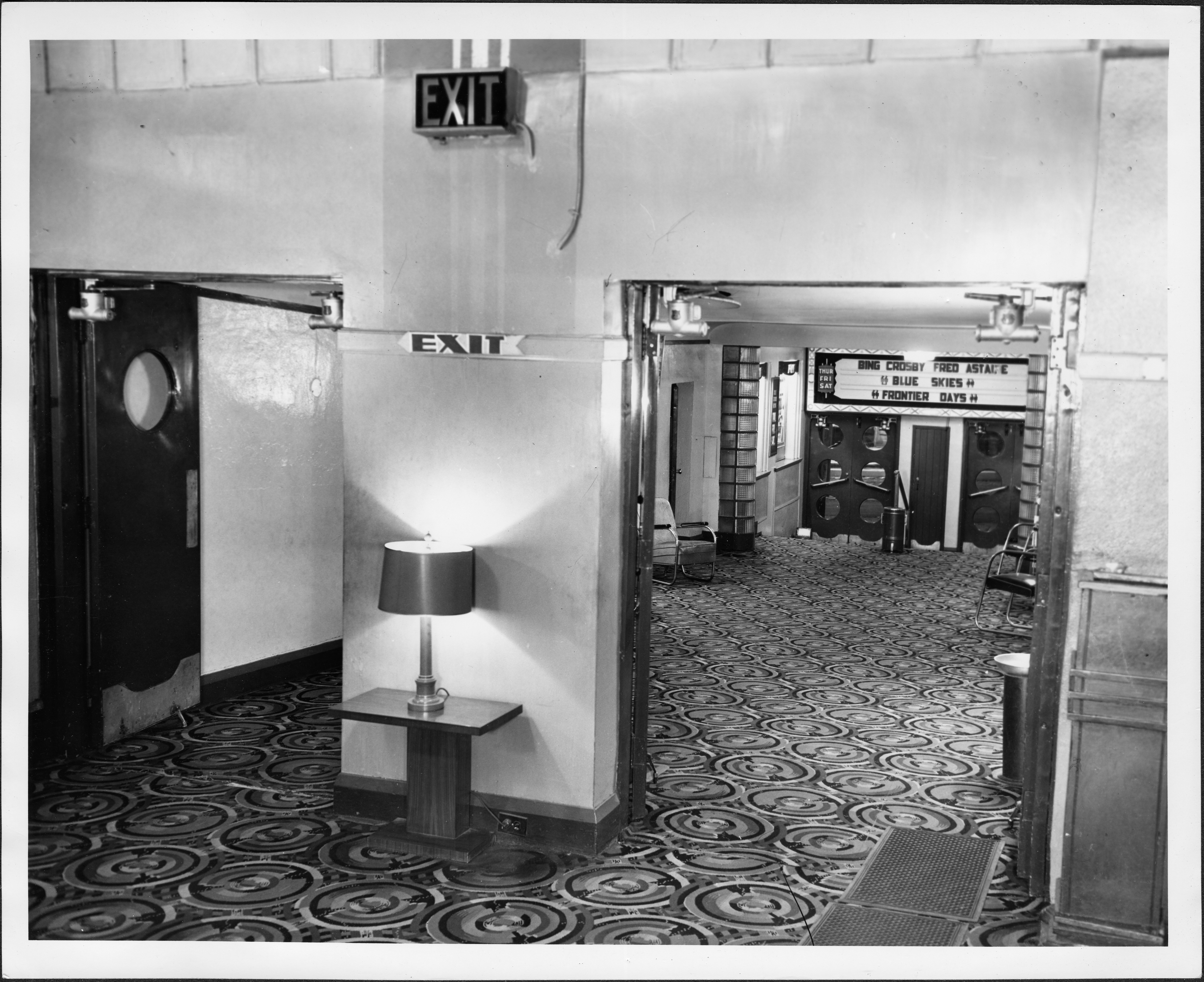
Inside the Fox Theatre, 1947.

The Fox Theatre is a cinema in the Beaches neighbourhood of Toronto, Ontario at the intersection of Queen Street and Beech Avenue. It has operated since 1914 when it first opened, and as a result it is the oldest continuously operating cinema in Toronto.

The Fox Theatre has a single screen and shows a mixture of new releases (in their second-run), independent and foreign films, and classical Hollywood cinema.

== History ==
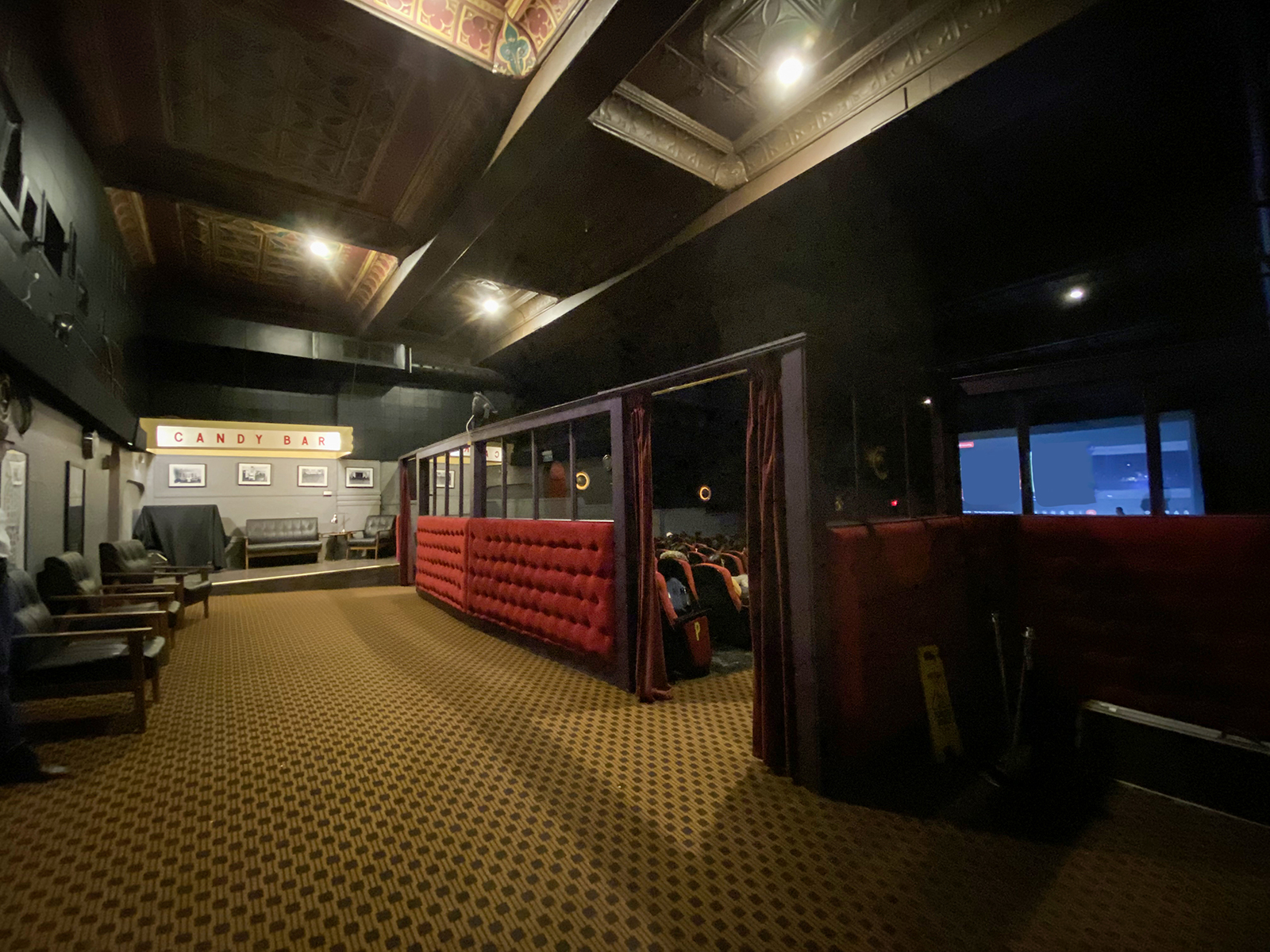
Fox Theatre inside in 2023

The Fox Theatre was built in 1914, making it the second-oldest cinema that is still in use in Toronto, after the Revue Cinema, which was built in 1912 and closed in 2006, before re-opening in 2007; as a result of this, the Fox Theatre is the oldest continuously operating cinema in Toronto.

Before opening in 1914, the theatre was referred to as "The Theatre Without A Name." A week before opening, a naming contest was held in the community, and the name "The Pastime" was chosen. The Fox was built for roughly $15,000 and was first owned by Arthur Brooks Webster. The first film to screen at the theatre was The Squaw Man (1914).

After less than a year, the name of the cinema was changed to the "Prince Edward Theatre" after Prince Edward, Prince of Wales, later King Edward VIII to honour a British dignitary who visited that year during the beginnings of World War I. The name change was also intended to aid in recruitment for the war, and recruitment meetings were often held in the cinema.

Years later, after Edward's abdication from the British throne in 1936, the theatre was renamed the "Fox Theatre". A stained glass panel with the Prince Edward name, over the doorway from the lobby, remains from the Prince Edward period.

In 1978, the cinema was taken over by Tom Litvinskas and Jerry Szczur, who began to develop it as a repertory cinema, screening a mixture of old classic films, foreign films, genre films, and new releases.

In 2007, the Fox Theatre underwent an extensive restoration. Some of the changes include 250 new plush reclining red-finish seats with cupholders, a 1930s-inspired carpet, a new concession stand with an old-fashioned popcorn machine and menu chalkboard, a reupholstered smoking wall, one-of-a-kind classic light up movie posters, and the original Prince Edward and candy bar signs.

In 2007, the cinema was bought by Daniel Demois and Andy Willick.

During the beginning of the COVID-19 pandemic in Canada, the cinema remained open, but instead of screening films in the theatre, it hosted virtual screenings, sold popcorn and other concessions to the local community, sold naming rights to each of the cinema's 248 seats, and rented out the theatre's marquee for people to display personal messages.

In 2020, the owners of the Fox Theatre planned to hold a séance due to long-running rumours that the cinema is haunted.

== See also ==
- List of cinemas in Toronto
