= Henry Hoschander =

Henry Hoschander (1927-2018) was a rabbi and lecturer.

Born in Dortmund, Germany, December 29, 1927, and raised in Borough Park, Brooklyn, New York, Henry Hoschander was ordained by Rabbi Joseph B. Soloveitchik of Yeshiva University. At the same time, he was awarded a bachelor's degree of Science in Mathematics and later a master's degree in Guidance and Counseling.

Rabbi Hoschander began his rabbinical career with his first pulpit in Northampton, Massachusetts, followed by his second in Pontiac, Michigan. He thereafter served as Rabbi of Congregation Beth Sholom in Rochester, New York. While there and several times since, he served as president and leader of the Rabbinic Alumni Association of Yeshiva University. Many of his sermons, authored and delivered in Rochester, were later published in the Journal of the Rabbinical Council of America (RCA), in which he was very active.

In the early 1970s, Rabbi Hoschander moved to Toronto, Ontario, to assume the leadership as senior Rabbi (he had two assistant Rabbis) at the Shaarei Shamayim synagogue. Under Hoschander's almost quarter century tenure as its spiritual leader, the synagogue membership grew to nearly 1,400 families and became the largest and wealthiest orthodox synagogue in the world at that time. Prior to his retirement from the active Rabbinate, Hoschander served as Canadian National Vice President of the Rabbinical Council of America several times over, Chairman of Canadian Bonds for Israel Rabbinical Cabinet and was acclaimed and popularly regarded as one of the most passionate and eloquent speakers in the world. Through his intimate friendship and personal connections with some of the world's leading Jewish philanthropists, including the late Joseph Tanenbaum of Toronto, he was able to garner support for the building and maintenance of yeshivos, seminaries, orphanages, synagogues and other Jewish institutions internationally. Hoschander was the first Rabbi ever to be honored by Michlalah-Jerusalem College for Women - with the degree of Doctor of Humane Letters, 'Honoris Causa' for his unwavering support of Torah and Jewish institutions the world over. He was referred to by many as "King of the Modern Orthodox Rabbinate" during his active tenure.

Up to his death, he continued to serve on the Toronto Vaad Harabanim, of which he had also served as president many times over. Following his retirement from the active Rabbinate, Hoschander continued to maintain a primary residence in Toronto, a residence in Florida and until very recently, he traveled regularly to Israel and occasionally other parts of the world where he continued to be a much sought after public speaker and lecturer in different forums and on varying topics germane to current Jewish Orthodoxy worldwide.

Rabbi Hoschander was descended from several noted Rabbinic dynasties, including Rabbi Samson Wertheimer, Rabbi Kalonymus Kalman Epstein (known as the "holy Ma'or Vashemesh") and Rabbi Menachem Mendel of Rimanov.

He died on February 10, 2018.
