= Minsk (disambiguation) =

Minsk is the capital of Belarus.

Minsk may also refer to:

== Places ==
- Minsk Governorate, Russian Empire, with capital Minsk
- Minsk National Airport, Belarus
- Minsk railway station
- Minsk region, Belarus
- Minsk Voivodeship, Polish–Lithuanian Commonwealth, with capital Minsk

- Mińsk County, Poland
- Mińsk Mazowiecki, town in Masovian Voivodeship, the seat of Mińsk County, Poland

== Technology ==
- Minsk family of computers, Soviet computer system
- Minsk (motorcycle), Belarusian motorcycle brand
- RFS Minsk, Ropucha-class landing ship in the Russian Navy
- Soviet aircraft carrier Minsk
- Soviet destroyer Minsk

== Other ==
- 3012 Minsk, minor planet
- BC Minsk, Belarus
- FC Minsk, Belarus
- Minsk agreements, 2014–2015 treaties that sought to end war in the Donbas region of Ukraine
- Minsk (band), an American post-metal band
- Minsk family of computers
- The Minsk, informal name of Anshei Minsk synagogue in Toronto which was founded by Russian Jewish emigrants from Minsk

== See also ==
- Minsc, a Baldur's Gate videogame character
