= Shaarei Shomayim (Toronto) =

Modern Orthodox synagogue in Toronto, Canada

Shaarei Shomayim Congregation
- Congregation logo

- Location in Toronto

Religion
- Affiliation: Modern Orthodox Judaism
- Ecclesiastical or organisational status: Synagogue
- Status: Active

Location
- Location: 470 Glencairn Avenue, North York, Toronto, Ontario
- Country: Canada
- Coordinates: 43.7131°N 79.4270°W

Architecture
- Type: Synagogue
- Established: 1931

Website
- www.shomayim.org

Shaarei Shomayim Congregation is a Modern Orthodox synagogue located at 470 Glencairn Avenue in North York, Toronto, Ontario, Canada. Established in 1931 as the Hillcrest Congregation, it was originally located on Christie Street before moving to St. Clair Avenue West and subsequently to its present location in 1966.

The congregation is located within the Toronto community eruv.

== History ==
=== Founding and early years ===
The congregation was established in March 1931 when a group of members separated from Toronto's Brothers of Jacob congregation to form the Hillcrest Congregation. The group initially held services in a rented Talmud Torah building at 563 Christie Street, north of St. Clair Avenue West. Although the congregation considered purchasing the property, it abandoned the plan after the city refused a building permit.

By 1934, the congregation had adopted the name Shaarei Shomayim and purchased land at 840 St. Clair Avenue West for $5,525. Construction began shortly thereafter, and the congregation held its first High Holy Days services in the basement of the unfinished synagogue in 1936.

=== St. Clair Avenue synagogue ===
The congregation continued to develop its St. Clair Avenue property during the following decade. Construction was delayed by restrictions on building materials during the Second World War. By 1944, a social hall had been completed and was being used for religious services. The synagogue was officially opened in October 1948, with the premier of Ontario and the mayor of Toronto in attendance. The building, which had an area of approximately 50,000 square feet (4,600 m^{2}), reportedly cost $500,000 to construct.

The synagogue was designed by the architectural firm Kaplan & Sprachman, which specialized in theatres and other public buildings, and had previously designed Anshei Minsk synagogue in Kensington Market. Its main auditorium was constructed without interior supporting columns, providing unobstructed views of the sanctuary. The Holy Ark was made of black Italian marble, and the sanctuary featured 12 stained-glass windows depicting themes from Jewish history and religious life.

The congregation was among Toronto's largest Orthodox congregations during this period. Its membership included families from a range of religious backgrounds, reflecting the movement of Toronto's Jewish population northward from neighbourhoods around Queen, Dundas, Harbord and Bloor streets.

=== Relocation to Glencairn Avenue ===
During the 1950s and 1960s, Toronto's Jewish population continued to move northward, including to North York and Thornhill. In response to these demographic changes, Shaarei Shomayim purchased property on Glencairn Avenue, near Bathurst Street and Eglinton Avenue, and relocated to its present building at 470 Glencairn Avenue in 1966.

The former St. Clair Avenue synagogue was sold to Hungarian House, a community organization serving Toronto's Hungarian population. In 2011, the property was purchased by developer Urbancorp for $5.5 million, with plans for a mixed-use residential and commercial development. By September 2012, the deteriorating building was being prepared for demolition, including the removal of asbestos.

In 1980, Machzikei B'nai Israel Synagogue, also known as the Dovercourt Shul, merged with Shaarei Shomayim. The merger brought the McCowan Street Cemetery under the congregation's administration.

The congregation subsequently undertook several renovations of its Glencairn Avenue building. In 2004, changes were made to the sanctuary's mechitza, the partition separating the men's and women's seating areas. The wood-and-glass partition was raised to 48 inches (120 cm) above the women's section.

Further renovations were undertaken around 2010, including improvements to the congregation's social facilities. In 2013, the sanctuary, main lobby and banquet hall were renovated, resulting in the creation of the Sharp Sanctuary.

=== Stained-glass windows ===
Among the most distinctive architectural features of the St. Clair Avenue synagogue were its 12 stained-glass windows, which depicted subjects from Jewish history and religious life. One window, designed by the congregation's rabbi, Judah Washer, commemorated the establishment of the State of Israel in 1948. It depicted Jewish agricultural activity in Israel, the Western Wall and a Hebrew inscription translated as "And let our eyes behold thy return in mercy to Zion."

Following the congregation's relocation in 1966, several of the original windows were placed in storage at the Glencairn Avenue synagogue. Around 2010, Hy Hirshberg, chair of the congregation's House Committee, discovered nine of the windows in crates in a basement mechanical room, where they had remained for more than four decades.

The windows were subsequently restored and placed in custom-built frames. By September 2012, four had been installed with backlighting in the renovated Sisterhood Hall, while five others were awaiting installation elsewhere in the building. The restoration preserved architectural elements of the former St. Clair Avenue synagogue shortly before its planned demolition.

== Clergy ==
- Rabbi Judah Washer served as an early spiritual leader of the congregation during its pivotal decade on St. Clair Avenue. He is noted for designing one of the synagogue's historic 1948 stained-glass windows commemorating the creation of the State of Israel.
- Rabbi Walter Wurzburger served as the head rabbi of Shaarei Shomayim from 1953 to 1966. He was a monumental figure in Modern Orthodox Judaism, a student of Rabbi Joseph B. Soloveitchik, and leader of the Rabbinical Council of America. He led the congregation right through its major transition and relocation from St. Clair Avenue to the current Glencairn Avenue building in 1966.
- Rabbi Emanuel Forman assumed leadership as the senior rabbi of the congregation in late 1967. Arriving from the Young Israel of Brookline, he guided the community through its first years in the newly established Glencairn Avenue building before eventually making Aliyah to Israel.
- Rabbi Henry Hoschander assumed leadership as the senior Rabbi in the early 1970s and served for almost a quarter of a century. Under his tenure, the synagogue grew immensely to nearly 1,400 families, making it one of the largest Orthodox congregations in the world at the time.

The congregation's clergy have included Rabbi Sam Taylor, Rabbi Elliott Diamond and cantor Rabbi Chaim Freund. Ralph Levine has served as shamash and baal koreh.

== See also ==
- History of the Jews in Toronto
- List of synagogues in Canada
