= Harold Kaplan (architect) =

Canadian architect (1895-1973)

Harold Solomon Kaplan
- Kaplan, on the right, c. 1952
- Born: 10 September 1895; Bucharest, Romania
- Died: 1 April 1973 (aged 77); Palm Beach, Florida, United States
- Occupation: Architect

Harold Kaplan (10 September 1895 – 1 April 1973) was a Canadian architect.

== Biography ==
Born 10 September 1895, in Bucharest, Romania, he moved to London at the age of three with his widowed mother, Tillie Hohan. In 1902, they moved to Toronto, and then his mother married Frank Kaplan. During his teenage years, he stayed for a while in Philadelphia with one of his relatives. After returning to Toronto, Kaplan went to Toronto Technical School where he studied architecture and building construction. He married Dorothy Spain in 1923. He apprenticed with Henry Simpson. In 1919–20, he worked at Page & Warrington. In 1922, he founded Kaplan & Sprachman with Abraham Sprachman, which is mostly recognized for designing many movie theaters across Canada from the 1920s to the 1950s, and also for designing synagogues and buildings for the Jewish communities.

His work was part of the architecture event in the art competition at the 1948 Summer Olympics. The Primrose Club commissioned Kaplan & Sprachman for its new building in Toronto in 1959. The firm designed the historic Anshei Minsk Synagogue, the Shaarei Shomayim synagogue, both in Toronto, Beth Israel Synagogue in Edmonton, Beth Israel in Vancouver, Baycrest Centre for Geriatric Care, the new Mount Sinai Hospital, Oakdale Golf & Country Club and numerous other synagogues and institutions throughout the country.

Kaplan & Sprachman designed the Eglinton Theatre in Toronto and the Vogue Theatre in Vancouver which were both designated National Historic Sites by the Historic Sites and Monuments Board of Canada. Overall, they designed more than 70 theaters which were built across Canada between the late 1920s and the early 1950s.
