= Anshei Minsk =

Synagogue in Toronto, Ontario

Beth Israel Anshei Minsk
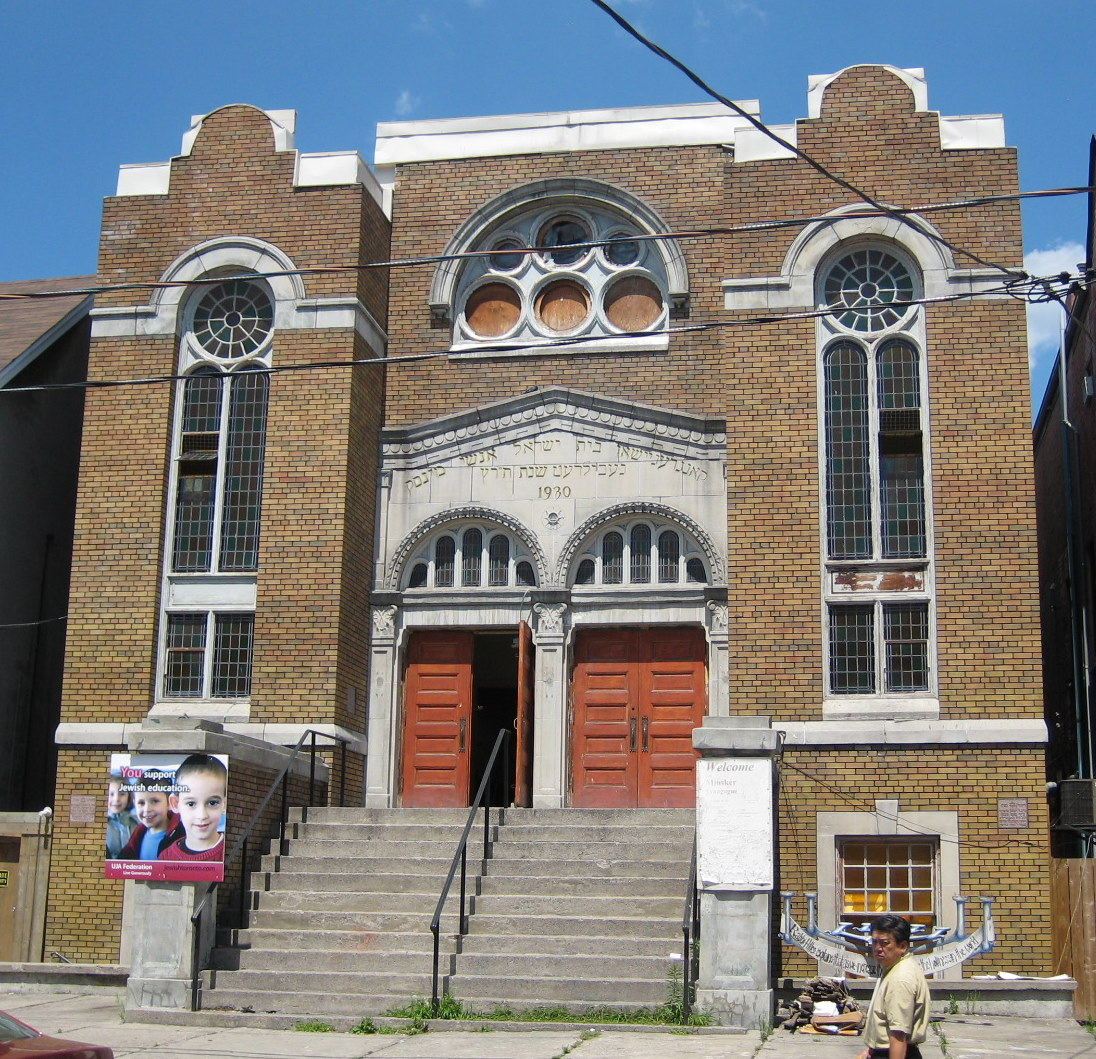
- Anshei Minsk Synagogue (1930), Kensington Market

- Location in Toronto

Religion
- Affiliation: Orthodox Judaism
- Rite: Ashkenazi
- Ecclesiastical or organisational status: Synagogue
- Leadership: Rabbi Shmuel Spero
- Status: Active

Location
- Location: 10 St. Andrew Street, Toronto, Ontario M5T 1K6
- Coordinates: 43.654273°N 79.399403°W

Architecture
- Architect: Kaplan & Sprachman
- Style: Byzantine Revival
- General contractor: Jacob (Nahum) Glassman
- Completed: 1930

Specifications
- Direction of façade: South
- Capacity: 350
- Materials: Brick

Website
- theminsk.com

Anshei Minsk (formally Beth Israel Anshei Minsk, informally the Minsk) is a synagogue in the Kensington Market neighbourhood of Toronto, Ontario, Canada. It was founded in 1912 by poor Jewish immigrants from what is now Belarus (mostly Minsk), which at the time was part of the Russian Empire. The current Byzantine Revival building was completed in 1930.

The congregation has had only three full-time rabbis: Meyer Levy (1916–1921), Meyer Zimmerman (1940–1954), and Shmuel Spero, who has served from 1988 to the present. It is the only Orthodox synagogue in Downtown Toronto with a full-time rabbi. It holds regular services on Friday evenings.

== Founding ==
Anshei Minsk was the first congregation formed in the Kensington Market neighbourhood of Toronto, Ontario, Canada in 1912, at a time when most of Toronto's Jewish population still lived in The Ward but were moving westward in increasing numbers to the Market and the surrounding area.

The Minsk originated as a landsmanshaft synagogue with its immigrant congregation based on a country, district or city of origin, in this case most of the Minsk's founders were poor Jews from Minsk (in Belarus), who had settled in Kensington Market at the turn of the century. At its founding, it was a shtibel or small storefront synagogue typical of poorer Jewish immigrant communities of the time.

The land on which the current synagogue was built is located at 10-12 St. Andrew Street, across the street from what is thought to be the location of the original storefront synagogue. The location was purchased by the congregation in 1913 for $9,000. The two houses originally on the property were used not only as a location for the congregation to worship, starting in about 1916, but also housed up to 14 tenants. By 1923, only the caretaker was domiciled there and by 1925 the property was used exclusively as a synagogue.

== Synagogue building ==
Funds were raised for the construction of a synagogue building, on St. Andrew Street near Spadina Avenue, designed by Harold Solomon Kaplan and Abraham Sprachman. Construction appears to have commenced around 1922 but was a gradual process and it was not until the end of 1930 that both houses were demolished and the current building was completed. The Byzantine Revival building has notable exterior features including twin towers, a large entrance stairway, and a central stained-glass window between the towers. While the lot itself is north–south and the facade is on the south side of the building, the interior layout is designed according to Jewish custom so that the main sanctuary is on the eastern wall so that prayers are directed towards Jerusalem. The eastern wall is punctuated by stained-glass windows, and decorated with painted murals of a lion and an antelope on either side of a window above the ark.

The synagogue, which can seat 350 worshippers, was constructed by Jacob (Nahum) Glassman, a Russian immigrant who had started a construction business and was the grandfather of journalist Michele Landsberg. Due to the onset of the Great Depression, the congregation was unable to pay Glassman in full for his services and so they offered him a lifetime membership in the synagogue instead.

== Rabbinic leadership ==
Meyer Levy served the congregation as rabbi from 1916 until 1921, after which the cantor led services for the most part until the late 1940s when Rabbi Meyer Zimmerman joined. Following his death in 1954, the members did not hire a new rabbi but instead invited guest rabbis to visit and teach or had the cantor or congregants lead services. The situation remained until 1988 when Rabbi Shmuel Spero was hired as the shul's rabbi, a position he continues to hold today.

== Recent history ==
Following World War II, Toronto's Jewish population gradually migrated away from the Kensington Market area and north up Bathurst Street. The Minsker became principally a 'businessman's shul' where Jewish businessmen would pray in the morning before work. The synagogue continues to serve older congregants who did not join the northward migration and remained in the area, along with Jewish students at the nearby University of Toronto, tourists, and younger Jews who have moved into the area.

The synagogue was recognized by the City of Toronto as a heritage property in 1985. The building was restored after a March 11, 2002 arson attack. The fire, which caused an estimated $200,000 worth of damage, began in the women's gallery which also functioned as a book depository. Thousands of books were damaged in the fire, many of which were over a century old. Others were severely damaged but were saved or restored due to a conservation effort funded by Heritage Canada which saw many of the books freeze dried and then painstakingly restored.

Anshei Minsk, the Kiever Synagogue (also in Kensington Market), and Shaarei Tzedek are the only historic Orthodox congregations remaining of at least 40 that existed in downtown Toronto in the early 1930s. Anshei Minsk is the only Orthodox synagogue in downtown Toronto with a full-time rabbi, and for many years was the only functioning Orthodox Jewish synagogue in downtown Toronto to hold daily services.
