= Abraham Sprachman =

Canadian architect (1896–1971)

- Born: 15 January 1896; Obertyn, Ukraine
- Died: 6 August 1971 (aged 75); Toronto, Ontario, Canada
- Occupation: Architect

Abraham Sprachman (15 January 1896 – 6 August 1971) was a Canadian architect. In 1922, he founded Kaplan & Sprachman with Harold Kaplan, which is mostly recognized for designing many movie theaters across Canada from the 1920s to the 1950s, and also for designing synagogues and buildings for the Jewish communities. His work was part of the architecture event in the art competition at the 1948 Summer Olympics.

Kaplan & Sprachman designed the Eglinton Theatre in Toronto and the Vogue Theatre in Vancouver which were both designated National Historic Sites by the Historic Sites and Monuments Board of Canada. Overall, they designed more than 70 theaters which were built across Canada between the late 1920s and the early 1950s.

His son, Mandel, was also a noted architect.
