= Eglinton Theatre =

Event venue and Cinema in Toronto, Ontario, Canada

Eglinton Grand
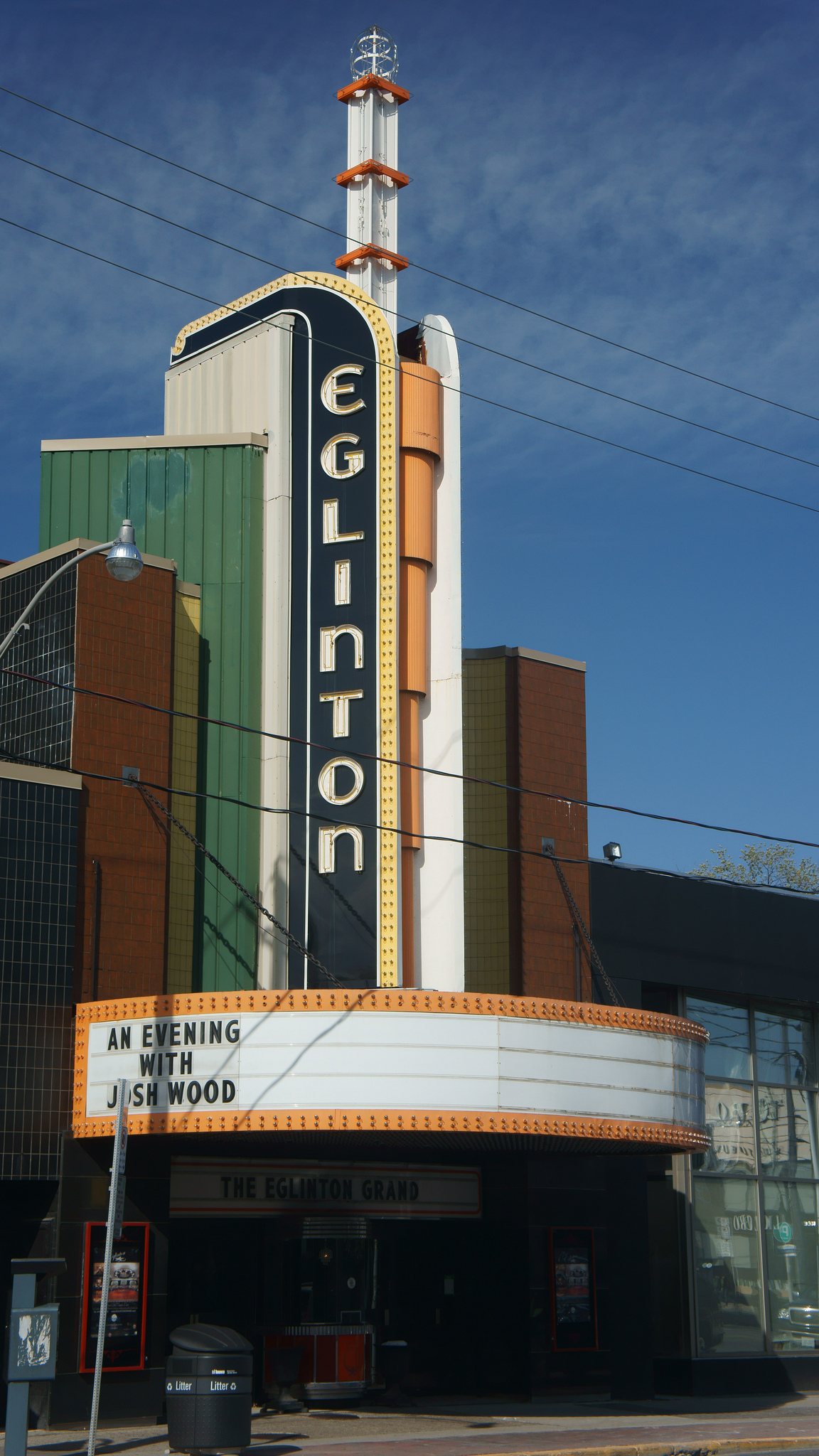
- Interactive map of Eglinton Grand
- Address: 400 Eglinton Avenue West
- Location: Toronto, Ontario
- Coordinates: 43°42′16″N 79°24′38″W
- Capacity: 300

Construction
- Opened: 2 April 1936
- Architect: Kaplan & Sprachman

Website
- eglintongrand.com

National Historic Site of Canada
- Designated: 1993

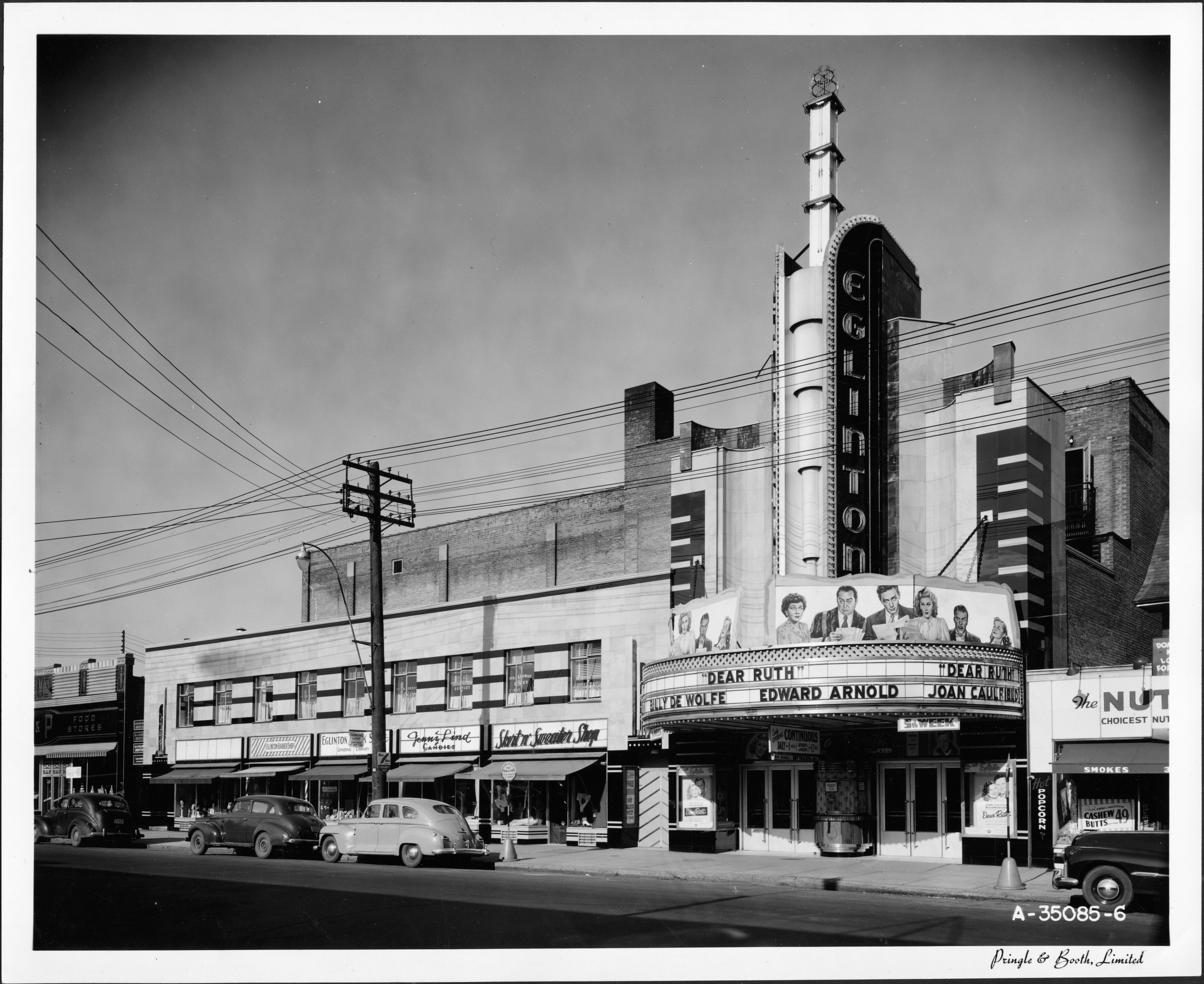
Eglinton Theatre, 1948

The Eglinton Theatre (or Eglinton Grand) is an event venue and cinema in Toronto, Ontario, Canada. In 2016, it was designated a National Historic Site by Parks Canada and the Historic Sites and Monuments Board of Canada.

Built in 1936, the Eglinton became one of the best examples of the Art Deco-style in Canadian theatre design. In 1937, architectural firm Kaplan & Sprachman was awarded the Royal Architecture Institute of Canada's Bronze Medal for their design of the theatre. From 1965 to 1967, the "Sound of Music" played for 146 weeks.

It operated as a cinema for 67 years, until 2003, after which it was converted to an event venue.

== See also ==
- List of cinemas in Toronto
