= Vogue Theatre (Vancouver) =

Theatre and former movie house in Canada

Coordinates: 49.279796°N 123.121661°W

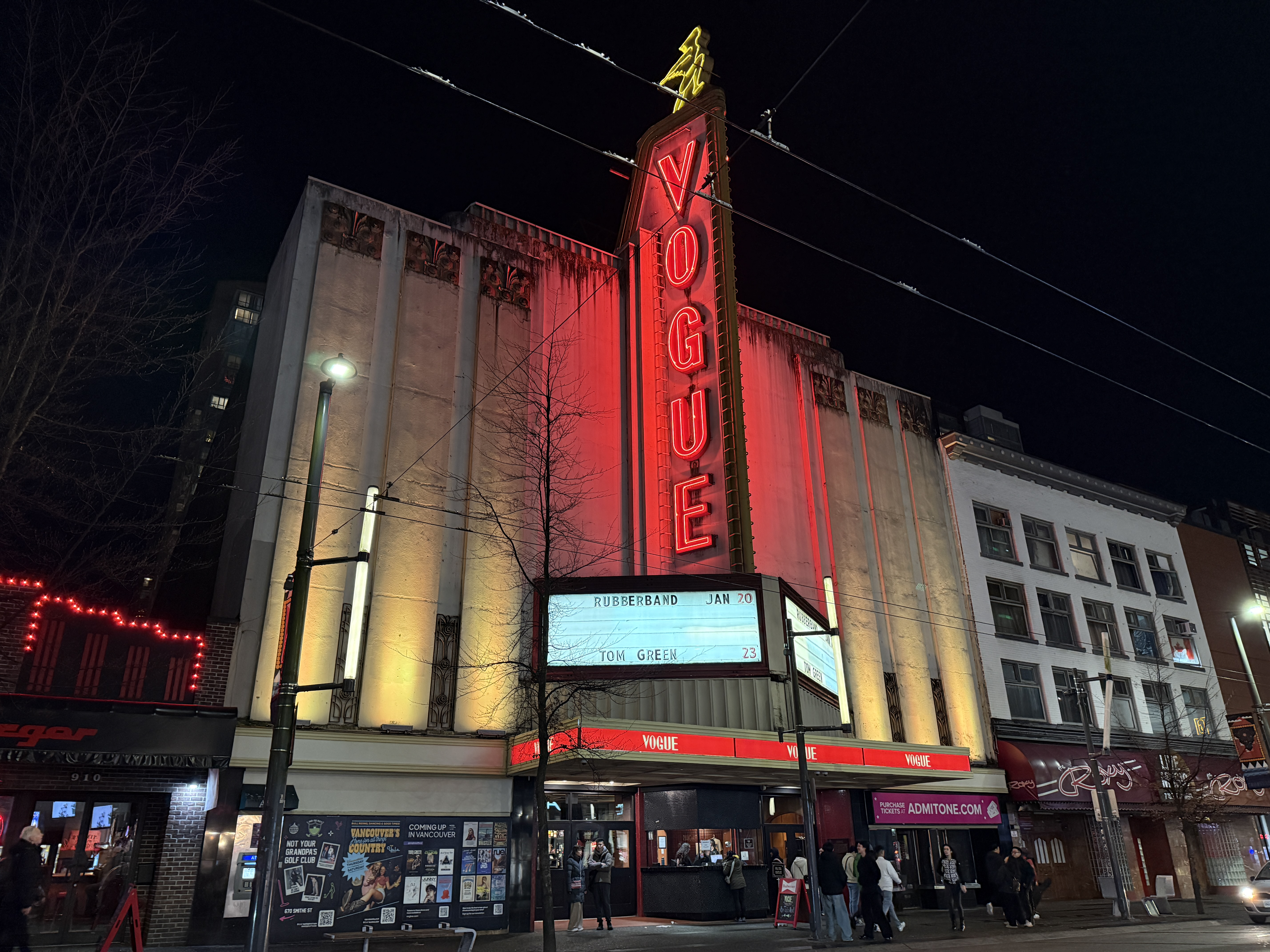
- The Vogue Theatre in Vancouver
- Interactive map of Vogue Theatre
- Address: 918 Granville Street; Vancouver, British Columbia; Canada
- Owner: The MRG Group
- Capacity: 1,280
- Screen: 1
- Current use: Live event venue

Construction
- Opened: 1941
- Architect: Kaplan & Sprachman

Website
- voguetheatre.com

National Historic Site of Canada
- Official name: Vogue Theatre National Historic Site of Canada
- Designated: 20 November 1993

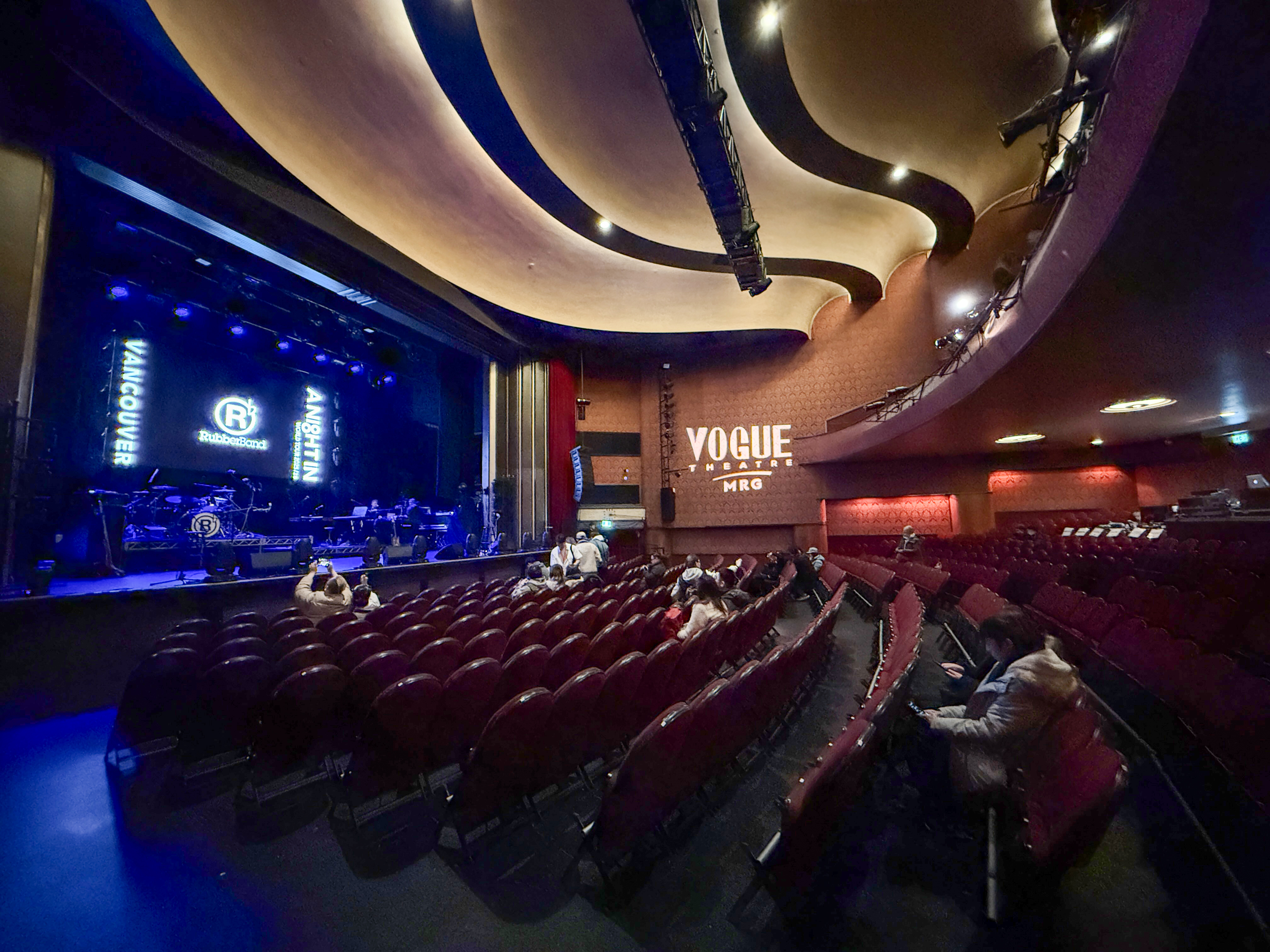
Theatre interior

Vogue Theatre is an Art Moderne styled building and an event venue for the performing arts, located in Vancouver, British Columbia, Canada. Situated on Vancouver’s “Theatre Row", the building was originally built as a movie house in 1941. It was designated as a National Historic Site of Canada in 1993.

== History ==
The Vogue Theatre was designed by the architectural firm of Kaplan & Sprachman. Construction began in 1940 and was completed in 1941. It was operated by Canadian Odeon Theatres until 1984, then by Cineplex Odeon. A 1998 restoration project brought back the Vogue Theatre’s original appearance, as well as state-of-the-art light and sound systems being installed. In 2010, the property's owner, Gibbons Hospitality Group, announced intentions of converting it to an event space. The Vogue has hosted events such as Vancouver’s ComedyFest, Vancouver International Film Festival and Vancouver International Jazz Festival.

== Architecture ==
The Vogue Theatre is an example of Art Deco or Moderne architecture. The Vogue has been a National Historic Site of Canada since it was officially recognized by the federal government on November 20, 1993, under the Historic Sites and Monuments Act. The interiors of the building are not officially protected. The Vogue is also a City of Vancouver heritage "A" building.

=== Exterior design ===
The Vogue Theatre is crafted in the Art Deco style, emphasizing sleek lines and fluid contours. It has symmetrical façades, constructed in a mixture of textured concrete and terrazzo panels with wrought-iron screens. One of the defining features of Vogue is its large neon sign which is topped by silhouette of the Roman Goddess Diana.

=== Interior design ===
The Vogue Theatre has 1,161 seats with 614 on the orchestra level, 211 in the Dress Circle, and 336 on the Upper Circle. It has curved balconies and curved ceilings in the Art Deco style.

The Vogue has an elaborate modulated lighting system. The stage, made of black-painted maple, is equipped with a flying system 30 feet above the floor. The air-conditioning systems and ducts are concealed in the ceiling coves, which improves the acoustics of the theatre.
