= Kaplan & Sprachman =

Canadian architectural firm

- Type: Architectural firm
- Industry: Architecture
- Founded: 1929
- Founders: Harold Solomon Kaplan; Abraham Sprachman
- Headquarters: Toronto, Ontario, Canada

Kaplan & Sprachman was a Canadian architectural firm based in Toronto, Ontario, founded by Harold Solomon Kaplan (1895–1973) and Abraham Sprachman (1894–1971). The firm specialized in movie theatre design and was responsible for the design of more than 300 theatres across Canada between 1929 and 1965. Its work was particularly associated with Art Deco and Art Moderne architecture.

== History ==
Kaplan was born in Romania and Sprachman in Ukraine. Both immigrated to Canada as children and studied drafting. They began designing movie theatres in Toronto in 1926 and formally established their architectural practice in 1929.

During the 1930s, the firm designed 41 theatres and renovated another 77. Its buildings incorporated contemporary developments in acoustics, ventilation and cinema technology, alongside decorative features such as illuminated marquees, curved surfaces, chrome detailing and glass blocks. Among its best-known projects were the Eglinton Theatre in Toronto and the Vogue Theatre in Vancouver.

The firm also designed residential, commercial and institutional buildings, including several synagogues and Jewish community facilities. Its commissions included Anshei Minsk, a Byzantine Revival synagogue completed in 1930 in Toronto's Kensington Market neighbourhood, and the former Shaarei Shomayim synagogue on St. Clair Avenue West, which opened in 1948. Other commissions included Beth Israel synagogue in Vancouver, Beth Israel in Edmonton, and Jewish community centres in Toronto and Hamilton.

The firm's cinema business declined during the 1950s as television became more popular and demand for new theatres decreased. It subsequently concentrated largely on theatre renovations.

Abraham Sprachman's son, Mandel Sprachman, joined the firm after graduating from the University of Toronto in 1953. He established his own architectural practice in 1958.

In 1989, Kaplan and Sprachman were posthumously inducted into the Ontario Association of Architects Honour Roll. In 2008, the firm was designated a national historic event by the Canadian government in recognition of its contribution to Canadian cinema architecture.

The firm is estimated to have designed 70 to 80% of all movie theaters in Canada from 1919 to 1950.

== Selected works ==
- Anshei Minsk, Toronto (1930)
- Vogue Theatre, Vancouver (1935)
- Eglinton Theatre, Toronto (1936)
- Allenby Theatre (later Roxy Theatre), Toronto (1935)
- Park Theatre, Vancouver (1940)
- Odeon Theatre, Kingston, Ontario (1941)
- Shaarei Shomayim synagogue, Toronto (1948)
- Young Men's and Young Women's Hebrew Association (Bloor Y), Toronto (1953; in collaboration with other architectural firms)
