= List of cinemas in Toronto =

This is a list of cinemas that exist or have existed in the city of Toronto, Ontario, Canada.

Name	Location	Opened	Closed	Screens	Notes	Image
Academy Theatre	Bloor and Lansdowne	1934	1965	1		
Albion Cinemas	Albion and Kipling			3	Shows Hindi, Punjabi, Telugu, Tamil and Bengali films.	
Alhambra	568 Bloor Street, west of Bathurst	1910	1986	1	Also known as the King George, Baronet, and also the Eve, a porn cinema.	
AMC Kennedy Commons 20	Kennedy and 401	1998	August 2012	20		
Avalon Theatre	2923 Danforth west of Victoria Park	1926	1955	1	Clyde Theatre until 1930	
Avenue Theatre	Eglinton and Avenue	1938	1955	1		
Backstage	Yonge and Bloor	c1970	c2000	2	Opened as part of the conversion of Loew's Uptown into a multiplex, but reached by a separate entrance; originally considered part of that multiplex, and called the Uptown Backstage.	
Bay Theatre	Queen and Bay	1910	1965	1	Earliest purpose built cinema in Toronto.	
Bayview Theatre	Leaside	1936	1961	1	Later was a live theatre venue known as the Bayview Playhouse. Now a drug store.	
Beach Theatre	The Beaches	1919	1970	1	Remodeled into a shopping centre.	
Cineplex Cinemas Beaches (formally Alliance Atlantis Beaches)	1651 Queen Street East, Queen and Coxwell	1999	February 2026	6	Built on the site of the former Greenwood Racetrack.	
Beaver Theatre	The Junction	1913	1961	1		
Bellevue Theatre	On College St. near Brunswick	1937	1958	1		
Biltmore Theatre	Yonge and Dundas	1948	1977	1		
Birchcliff Theatre	Birch Cliff	1949	1974	1		
Bloor Theatre	Bathurst and Bloor	1919	1957	1	Originally Allen's Bloor Theatre, Famous Players acquired it in 1923 and operated it until 1957. Became the Blue Orchid nightclub and has been Lee's Palace music venue since 1985.	
Bloordale Theatre (later known as State)	1606 Bloor St W at Dundas St W	1937	1968	1	Building in use as commercial space	
Bohemian Theatre	Yonge St at Elm Street		Closed	1		
Brighton Theatre	Roncesvalles		Closed	1	Building is in use as a convenience store	
Broadview Theatre	Broadview and Gerrard	1941	1945	1		
Broadway Theatre	75 Queen St West	1919	1965	1	Was originally The Globe burlesque and vaudeville; renamed the Roxy in 1933 and Broadway in 1937; was burlesque and film until its demolition for Sheraton Hotel.	
Cameo Theatre	Pape and Floyd East York	1934	1957	1		
Capitol Fine Arts Theatre	Yonge and Eglinton	1923	1998	1	Converted to an event venue in 1998.	
Carlton Cinema	Yonge and Carlton	1981	present	9	Focus on foreign and independent film. Closed in 2009 by Cineplex Odeon; reopened in 2010 under the ownership of Rainbow and Magic Lantern Cinemas, and acquired by Imagine Cinemas in 2016.	
Carlton Theatre	Parliament and Carlton	1930	1954	1	Not to be confused with the far more famous Odeon Carlton; this was a much smaller theatre on Parliament Street just north of Carlton Street. After closing as a movie house, it was used as a CBC studio and is currently the Canadian Children's Dance Theatre.	
Cedarbrae Cinemas 8	Markham and Lawrence	1969	2003	8		
Centre Theatre	Bathurst and Dundas	1935	1977	1		
Cinecity	Yonge and Charles	1966	1975	1		
Cinema Lumière (see Garden Theatre)	College at Spadina			1		
Cinema at the Toronto Dominion Centre	Toronto Dominion Centre	1967	1978	1		
Cineplex Cinemas Empress Walk 10	North York Centre	1999	present	10	Formerly a SilverCity and Empire Theatres from 2005 to 2013.	
Cineplex Cinemas Queensway and VIP	The Queensway	2001	present	15-5	VIP Cinemas opened in January 2014. Formerly Cineplex Odeon	
Cineplex Cinemas Yonge & Dundas Cinemas	10 Dundas East	2008	present	24	Most screens ever in the City of Toronto. Formerly AMC Yonge & Dundas 24	
Cineplex Odeon Eglinton Town Centre	Golden Mile	2000	present	16		
Cineplex Odeon Morningside	Sheppard and Morningside	1997	present	11		
Cineplex Odeon Sheppard Grande	Yonge and Sheppard				Relocated to Empress Walk in June 2013	
Cineplex Odeon Varsity Cinemas	Manulife Centre	1974	present	2-12	Includes some luxury "VIP" theatres.	
Circle Theatre	North Toronto	1933	1956	1		
Classic Theatre (originally named "The King's Royal Theatre")	Greenwood and Gerrard	1914	1957	1	As of 1 Dec. 2017, it is The Redwood Theatre	
Cineplex Cinemas Scarborough	Scarborough Town Centre	1998	present	12	Features Xscape Entertainment Centre and two Party Rooms.	
College Theatre	College and Ossington	1924	1967	1		
Comique Theatre	Yonge and Dundas	1908	1914	1		
Community Theatre	1202 Woodbine Ave. East York	1937	1955	1		
Coronet Theatre	Yonge and Gerrard	1951	1983	1	Originally named the Savoy; became the Coronet in 1963. Well known grindhouse in the 1970s. Now, a jewellery store.	
Cumberland Four	Yorkville	1981	2012	4	Specialized in independent and foreign films and was a mainstay venue for the Toronto International Film Festival. Owned by Famous Players until 1997 when it was sold to Alliance. Owned and operated by Cineplex from 2005 until close.	
Danforth Music Hall	Danforth and Broadview	1919	2004	1	Originally named Allen's Danforth. Later, The Century, and also Titania. Now a live music venue.	
Donlands Theatre	Donlands and O'Connor			1	Currently a recording studio.	
Don Mills	Don Mills and Lawrence Ave (Don Mill Shopping Centre)			1		
Downtown Theatre	Yonge and Dundas	1948	1972	1	Current site of Sankofa Square.	
Dufferin Drive-In	Dufferin and Steeles	1950	1984	1		
Eastwood Theatre	1430 Gerrard Street East (near Ashdale Avenue)	1927	1985	1	Later was the Naaz and then the India Centre mall. In 2015 it was heavily renovated and converted to apartments with retail on the ground floor.	
Eaton Centre Cineplex	Toronto Eaton Centre	1979	2001	17-21	First venue in the Cineplex chain. Originally known as "Cineplex 18", then expanded to "Cineplex 21", then four auditoriums were combined into one. Considered the world's first megaplex.	
Eclipse Theatre	Cabbagetown	1947	1951	1		
Eglinton Theatre	Eglinton and Avenue Road	1936	2003	1	Converted to an event venue.	
Elane Theatre	Eglinton and Danforth	1963	1985	1		
Elgin Theatre	Queen and Yonge	1913	1980s	1	Originally part of a twin live theatre, the Elgin and Winter Garden Theatres. When the upstairs Winter Garden closed in 1928, the lower theatre was converted to a cinema, which was known variously as Loew's, the Elgin, and the Yonge. It was then closed and both theatres were restored and are now theatre venues.	
Famous Players Canada Square	Canada Square	1985	2021	8		
Finch	Finch at Dufferin		closed	3		
Fox Theatre	The Beaches	1914	present	1	Oldest theatre in continuous operation in Toronto.	
Garden Theatre (later known as Elektra, Cinema Lumiere, Chang's)	290 College St, near Spadina	1916	1986	1	Opened as the Garden Theatre, so named because of its roof garden. It was a vaudeville venue before becoming the Garden Cinema in 1937. In 1950, the second floor was converted into the Garden Billiard Academy and then in 1960 the New Garden Billiard Academy. The cinema on the first floor was renamed the Elektra in 1965, closing in 1969. The entire building served as a pool hall until 1972 when Cinema Lumiere, a repertory art cinema, opened and operated until 1980 when it became Chang's Theatre, a Chinese cinema featuring "Taiwanese porn with religious overtones". Chang's closed in 1983. 18 months later, the venue again became Cinema Lumiere in 1985, featuring art films, foreign and alternative films but closed again in 1986 when its roof collapsed during a rainstorm. The building later became a computer store and then a Home Hardware.	
Gay Theatre	Parliament and Dundas	1950s		1		
Glendale Theatre	Avenue Rd between Lawrence and Wilson	1947	1974	1	Showed Cinerama features. Demolished.	
Golden Classics	Spadina and Queen	1977	1990s	1	Chinese cinema. From 2010 to 2012 the building was home to the Toronto Underground Cinema.	
Golden Mile Plaza Theatre	Victoria Park and Eglinton	1954	1986	2		
Granada Theatre	417 Danforth Avenue		1960	1		
The Grand Gerrard Theatre	Jones and Gerrard	c1911	Closed	1	Converted from two houses to a theatre that in 1911 the theatre known as The Bonita has gone through many incarnations since the 1970s (Greek, Hong Kong, Bollywood, Tamil) before becoming an independent cinema hub devoted to art, schlock, indie and foreign programming from around the world. Has also been known as The Wellington, Krishna Cinema, Sri Lakshmi and Gerrard Cinema before re-opening in 2011 as an art house cinema, the Projection Booth. In 2013 it briefly closed due to a falling out among its owners and then re-opened as The Big Picture with Jonathan Hlibka as sole proprietor but closed as of 2016. It reopened in April 2019 as The Grand Gerrard Theatre.	
Griffin's Agnes St. Theatre	72 Agnes St. (Dundas)	1909	Closed	1		
Griffin's Hippodrome	219 Yonge St	1907	Rebranded 1915	1		
Grover Theatre	Danforth and Main	Early 1920s	c1963	1		
Hollywood Theatre	Yonge and St. Clair	1930	1999	2	The first theater built to show "talkies"	
Hot Docs Ted Rogers Cinema	Bathurst and Bloor	1941	present	1	Built in 1941 on the site of the Madison Theatre (1913), which was demolished in 1940. Known as the Midtown, Capri, Eden and Bloor Cinemas. Took the name Bloor when the old Bloor, now Lee's Palace, closed. Today, it is operated as the Hot Docs Ted Rogers Cinema, with documentary films predominantly featured, but also a host to other film festivals. Purchased by the Hot Docs Canadian International Documentary Festival in 2016, using a $4 million gift from the Rogers Foundation, and was rebranded as the Hot Docs Ted Rogers Cinema.	
Humber Cinemas	Bloor St W at Jane St	1948	2019	4	One of the five original Odeon theaters built in Toronto. Closed in 2003 due to poor attendance. Reopened in April 2011 by Rui Pereira (owner of the Kingsway Cinema). Expanded from 2 to 4 cinemas in 2012. Permanently closed in May 2019.	
Imperial	Yonge and Dundas	1927	1988	1-6	Originally a single cinema and vaudeville house called the Pantages; renamed the Imperial in 1930 and exclusively a movie house; converted 1973 to the 6-screen Imperial Six; converted back to single-screen Pantages 1987; closed 1988 and eventually converted to become one of Toronto's main stage venues, first called the Pantages again, then the Canon, and now the Ed Mirvish Theatre.	
International Cinema	2061 Yonge St	c1933	c1987	1	Originally the Oriole.	
Island Theatre	Toronto Islands	c.1949	1955	1		
Joy Theatre	Queen and Jones		Closed	1	Today, a restaurant.	
Kingsway Theatre	Bloor St W at Royal York	1939	2006; 2009–present	1	Today, running first run and recent releases.	
Lakeshore	New Toronto			1		
Lansdowne Theatre	Bloor and Lansdowne	1936	1958	1		
Lightbox	King and John	2010	present	5	Headquarters for the Toronto International Film Festival. Plays retrospectives and series as part of TIFF Cinematheque, along with new releases of independent, foreign, and Canadian films.	
Madison (1913)	Bloor St W at Bathurst	1913	1940	1	Demolished in 1940 and replaced by Midtown Theatre (known today as Hot Docs)	
Madison	4950 Yonge St., north of Sheppard					
Market Square	Front and Jarvis	1983	present	6	Opened as the Cineplex Odeon Market Square, now the Imagine Cinemas Market Square	
Metro Theatre	Bloor and Christie	1939	2013	3	Has been an adult movie theatre since 1978; the last such cinema in Toronto. In August 2012 it was announced that the Metro would become home to the art schlock indie foreign cinematic model under the same management of Projection Booth. However, after a falling out among the owners, The Metro closed permanently in December 2013.	
Mount Pleasant Cinema	Mount Pleasant and Eglinton	1926		1	Opened in 1926 as the Hudson Theatre.	
New Yorker Theatre	Yonge and Bloor	1919	unknown	1	Opened as the Victoria in 1919. Demolished, but some of the facade used in the Panasonic Theatre on the site.	
Northeast Drive-In Theatre	Sheppard Avenue East and Victoria Park	1947	1976	1		
North West Drive-In Theatre	Dixon Road and Highway 401	1948	1977	1		
Nortown	875 Eglinton Av W at Bathurst	1948	1974	1		
Odeon	1558 Queen St. W near Queen and Lansdowne	1919	1968	1	Not connected to the Odeon chain. Now a F45 gym.	
Odeon Carlton	Yonge and Carlton	1947	1973	1	Demolished.	
Odeon Danforth	Pape and Danforth	1947	unknown	2	Now a fitness centre.	
Odeon Fairlawn	Yonge and Lawrence	1947	1985	2	Demolished.	
Odeon Hyland	Yonge and St. Clair	1948	2003	2	Demolished.	
Odeon York	Yonge and Eglinton	1969	2001	2	Closed due to a court decision about accessibility. Became an event venue, then a fitness club, then a condo sales center, then demolished 2012.	
Ontario Place Cinesphere	Ontario Place	1971	2012 – closed as part of government decision to close Ontario place. Reopened 2017–present.	1	The world's first permanent IMAX theatre.	
Opera House	Queen and Broadview	1909		1	Today, a music venue.	
Orpheum Theatre	Queen and Bathurst			1		
Oxford Theatre	Danforth and Coxwell	1928 (renovated May 1937)		1		
Palace Theatre	Danforth and Pape	1924	1987	3		
Paradise Theatre	Bloor and Dovercourt	1937	present	1	Built on the location of the 1910 Bloor Palace (renamed The Kitchener in 1918). Reopened in late 2019.	
Park Theatre	Yonge and Lawrence	1921	1984	1	Opened as the Bedford Theatre. Renamed Park Theatre in 1949.	
Parkdale Theatre	Queen St W at Roncesvalles	1924	1970	1	Building still exists and is used as an antique furniture market.	
Parkway Drive-in	Woodbine and Steeles			1		
Parliament Theatre	Parliament and Gerrard	1929	1963	1		
Pickford Theatre	Queen and Spadina	1910	1940s	1	Opened as the Auditorium in 1908. Was renamed the Avenue Theatre in 1913.	
Plaza Theatre	Hudson's Bay Centre	1976	2001	2		
Prince of Wales Theatre	Danforth and Woodbine	1927	1966	1		
Radio City	Bathurst and St. Clair	1936	1975	1		
Red Mill	Yonge and Queen	1906	unknown	1	Toronto's first "permanent" movie theatre. Originally named the Theatorium.	
Regent Theatre	Davisville	1927	2018	1	Opened as the 'Belsize' for live theatre and cinema. Renamed the Crest in the 1950s, and was a live theatre venue exclusively from 1954 until 1966. It closed and re-opened in 1971 showing films. In 1984, it was renamed the Regent. It closed in 2018. It has been converted into an arts centre.	
Revue Cinema	Roncesvalles	1912	present	1	The Revue is the oldest purpose-built movie theatre presently operating in Toronto. The Revue operated continuously from 1912 to 2006. It re-opened in 2007 under new ownership and is managed by a non-profit organization.	
Rialto Theatre	219 Yonge St	1916		1	Rebranded from Griffin's Hippodrome after renovations starting in 1915	
Rio Theatre	Yonge and Gerrard	1913	1991	1	Opened as The Big Nickel Theatre in 1913. By 1922 it had been renamed National Theatre and was renamed Rio Theatre in 1943 serving as a grindhouse until it closed in 1991.	
Robinson's Musee Theatre	Yonge and Adelaide (91-93 Yonge Street)	1890	1905	1	Originally a curio museum, this hall was the site of the first screening of a motion picture in Toronto on 31 August 1896. On the second floor, it had a curio shop and waxworks, and the roof had an animal menagerie. It changed hands several times, was renamed the Bijou and was the first site of Shea's Theatre. Built by Richard A. Waite and destroyed by fire in 1905.	
Roxy Theatre	The Danforth	1936	2006	3	Opened as the Allenby Theatre.	
Royal Alexandra Theatre	Theatre District			1	Major performing arts venue that also served for a time as a cinema.	
Royal Cinema	College Street between Grace and Clinton	1939	present	1		
Runnymede Theatre	Bloor St W at Runnymede	1927	1999	2	Converted first to a Chapters book store, then to a Shoppers Drug Mart, it retains most of the original interior decoration.	
Scarboro	960 Kingston Road at Victoria Park	1936	1967	1	Was for a time a pool hall and then a sports bar. Today, rebuilt as condos.	
Scarboro Drive-In Theatre	Kennedy Road at Ranstone Gardens (south of Lawrence Avenue East)	1952	late 1970s	1	Claimed to have the biggest screen in Canada. Included a "kiddieland". Now the site of Jack Goodlad Park and community centre.	
Scotiabank Theatre Toronto	John and Richmond	1999	present	14	Originally named the Paramount. Features a bar and arcade. Licensed for beer in cinema.	
The Screening Room	Bloor St W at Royal York			1	Was located above the Kingsway Theatre and earlier was called the Kingsway 2.	
Shea's Hippodrome	Queen and Bay	1909	1954	1	Former vaudeville theatre that became one of Canada's largest cinemas.	
Sheraton Centre	Sheraton Centre	1974	1990s	2	Designed as a first-run theatre by Toronto-based architectural firm Searle, Wilbee, Rowland. Seating was provided for 682 & 344. Was a live cabaret venue for a short period. Now used as conference rooms.	
Sherway Cinemas	Sherway Gardens	1971	2001	13	Replaced by Queensway in 2001. Now a Sears store.	
SilverCity Fairview	Fairview Mall	1970	present	9	Originally Cineplex Odeon Fairview, became Rainbow Cinemas Willowdale from 1988 to 2008 with 8 screens. The theatre features a Screening Room and Lounge.	
SilverCity Yonge-Eglinton	Yonge and Eglinton	1998	present	9		
SilverCity Yorkdale	Yorkdale Shopping Centre	1963	present	3?-10	First shopping mall cinema in Canada. Rebuilt 1999 at a new location in the mall.	
Skyway 6 Cinemas	Airport Road	1980	1999	6		
Standard Theatre	Spadina and Dundas	1921	1994	1	Began as a Yiddish live theatre, becoming a cinema in the mid-1930s first as the Strand, then as the Victory. Was a live burlesque theatre from 1959 until the mid-1970s. As the Mandarin and the Golden Harvest was a Chinese-language cinema from the late-1970s until it closed.	
Stanford Theatre	Queen and Spadina	Early 20th century		1		
Teck Theatre	Queen and Broadview			1		
Tivoli Theatre	Yonge and Richmond		1965	1	Site of the first talking film in Toronto in 1928.	
Towne Cinema	Yonge and Bloor	1949	1985	1		
Underground Cinema	Spadina and Queen	2010	2012	1	Repertory cinema opened in what was formerly the Golden Classics venue.	
University Theatre	100 Bloor Street West	1949	1986	1	For a time the largest cinema in Canada. Demolished except for the facade, which was incorporated into a store.	
Uptown Theatre	Yonge and Bloor	1920	2003	3-5	Originally the single-screen Loew's Uptown Theatre. Converted into one of the world's first multiplexes. At that time the Backstage Theatre, then called the Uptown Backstage, was considered part of it. Eventually closed due to a court decision on accessibility, and demolished.	
Victory (see Standard Theatre, above)	Northeast corner of Spadina and Dundas					
Warden Woods	725 Warden Ave at St. Clair		Closed	multiple		
Westwood Theatre	Bloor and Kipling	1951	1998	3	Demolished.	
Willow Theatre	Yonge and Ellerslie	1950s	1987		Demolished; site is now a condominium.	
Woodside Cinemas	McCowan and Finch	1977	present	3	Currently shows Hindi, Tamil, and Punjabi films.	

== See also ==
- List of Ottawa-Gatineau cinemas
