= Dr. Simon Locke =

Canadian television series

- Len Birman, Jack Albertson and Sam Groom in "Dr. Simon Locke"
- Also known as: Police Surgeon
- Created by: Chester Krumholz and Wilton Schiller for Dorian-Bentwood Productions
- Starring: Sam Groom as Dr. Simon Locke; Jack Albertson as Dr. Andrew Sellers (1971–1972); Larry D. Mann as Lt. Jack Gordon (1972–1974)
- Country of origin: Canada
- No. of seasons: 4
- No. of episodes: 105

Production
- Executive producers: Wilton Schiller; Murray Chercover for CTV
- Producer: Chester Krumholz
- Running time: 30 minutes
- Production companies: The ValJon Production Company (Dr. Simon Locke); Four Star International (Dr. Simon Locke/Police Surgeon); Viacom Enterprises (Dr. Simon Locke); CTV Television Network (Police Surgeon); Sterno Productions Limited (Police Surgeon)

Original release
- Network: Syndication (1971–1974); CTV (1972–1974)
- Release: 1971 – 1975

Dr. Simon Locke (on-screen title is Doctor Simon Locke) is a Canadian medical drama that was syndicated to television stations in the United States from 1971 to 1974 through the sponsorship of Colgate-Palmolive. After the first season, the show was renamed Police Surgeon.

== Plot ==
The series was initially a medical drama that originated from the fictional rural town of Dixon Mills, where a young physician, Dr. Simon Locke (played by soap opera star Sam Groom), yearning for more than the big-city medical environment, arrives in town to assist veteran physician Dr. Andrew Sellers (played by veteran actor Jack Albertson), with some pushback and resistance from the local citizens to the new doctor. The plot lines were more fitting for a big city medical drama, including a typhoid epidemic, child abuse, and even a murder. The series co-starred Len Birman as Sheriff Dan Palmer and Nuala Fitzgerald as Nurse Louise Wynn.

In 1972, Albertson left the show, and the series was renamed Police Surgeon, where Dr. Locke moved back to the city and worked for the police department's emergency unit, where he assists the cops in solving crimes that require medical research. The reworked series initially featured Len Birman returning in his role, now as Lieutenant Dan Palmer, but in the third season Larry D. Mann stepped into the role as Locke's superior, as Lieutenant Jack Gordon. Nerene Virgin played Ellie the Dispatcher in over thirty episodes of the reworked series, best known for her "3-M-D-9" radio call. The series also featured guest stars such as William Shatner, Leslie Nielsen, Donald Pleasence, Michael Ansara, Martin Sheen, and Keenan Wynn. Additionally, a then-unknown John Candy made his 1974 TV debut in episodes "Target: Ms. Blue" and "Web of Guilt". Delroy Lindo also appeared in his earliest TV role doing bit parts in a few episodes filmed in 1974.

== Series overview ==
Season	Episodes	Premiered:	Ended:	On-screen title
1	27	13 September 1971	6 March 1972	Doctor Simon Locke
2	26	11 September 1972	12 March 1973	Police Surgeon
3	26	10 September 1973	11 March 1974	Police Surgeon
4	26	5 September 1974	6 March 1975	Police Surgeon

== Episode list ==
=== Season 1: 1971–72 ===
No. overall	No. in season	Title	Directed by	Written by	Original release date
1	1	"The Day Simon Locke Came to Dixon Mills"	John Meredyth Lucas	Chester Krumholz and Wilton Schiller	13 September 1971
2	2	"Gun Point"	Unknown	Unknown	20 September 1971
3	3	"Max"	George Gorman	Story by : Jeff Kantor; Teleplay by : Barry Oringer	27 September 1971
4	4	"Walden Lost"	Richard Gilbert	Harry Kronman	4 October 1971
5	5	"Death Is a Wanderer"	Richard Gilbert	Chester Krumholz and Wilton Schiller	11 October 1971
6	6	"The Cage"	John Meredyth Lucas	John Meredyth Lucas	1 November 1971
7	7	"Bad Blood"	John Meredyth Lucas	Chester Krumholz and Wilton Schiller	8 November 1971
8	8	"Where Are the Lucky Stars"	Gerald Mayer	Fred Freiberger	15 November 1971
9	9	"The Hero"	Gerald Mayer	Jim Carlson	22 November 1971
10	10	"Two Points of a Pitchfork: Part 1"	Gerald Mayer	Mort Forer, Marian Waldman, Chester Krumholz, and Wilton Schiller	29 November 1971
11	11	"Two Points of a Pitchfork: Part 2"	Gerald Mayer	Mort Forer, Marian Waldman, Chester Krumholz, and Wilton Schiller	6 December 1971
12	12	"The Healer"	John Meredyth Lucas	Story by : Brad Radnitz; Teleplay by : Chester Krumholz and Wilton Schiller	13 December 1971
13	13	"Coo-Coo in the Nest"	Gerald Mayer	Story by : Helen French; Teleplay by : Helen French, Chester Krumholz, and Wilton Schiller	3 January 1972
14	14	"The Man Who Hunted Hunters"	George Gorman	Story by : S. Rodge Olenicoff; Teleplay by : Mort Forer and Marian Waldman	10 January 1972
15	15	"Too Many Candles"	Gerald Mayer	Chester Krumholz and Wilton Schiller	17 January 1972
16	16	"Children of Silence"	Gerald Mayer	Oliver Crawford	24 January 1972
17	17	"Dark Future"	John Meredyth Lucas	Jim Carlson	31 January 1972
18	18	"September"	Unknown	Unknown	7 February 1972
19	19	"The Meddler"	John Meredyth Lucas	Chester Krumholz and Wilton Schiller	14 February 1972
19	19	"The Meddler"	John Meredyth Lucas	Chester Krumholz and Wilton Schiller	14 February 1972
20	20	"Marooned"	Unknown	Unknown	28 February 1972
21	21	"The Wanderer"	John Meredyth Lucas	Chester Krumholz and Wilton Schiller	6 March 1972
22	22	"Royal Treatment"	George Gorman	Chester Krumholz and Wilton Schiller	17 April 1972
23	23	"The Crash"	John Meredyth Lucas	Howard Dimsdale	8 May 1972
24	24	"Death Holds the Scales"	Richard Gilbert	Chester Krumholz and Wilton Schiller	5 June 1972
25	25	"The Perfect Specimen"	Richard Gilbert	Chester Krumholz and Wilton Schiller	4 September 1972
26	26	"The Cortessa Rose"	Gerald Mayer	John Meredyth Lucas	2 April 1972
27	27	"Quiet Sunday"	Gerald Mayer	Chester Krumholz and Wilton Schiller	14 May 1972

=== Season 2: 1972–73 ===
No. overall	No. in season	Title	Directed by	Written by	Original release date
28	1	"The Text According to Gracie"	John Meredyth Lucas	Fred Freiberger	11 September 1972
29	2	"Lady X"	Gerald Mayer	Oliver Crawford	18 September 1972
30	3	"Ten Kilos to Nowhere"	Unknown	Unknown	25 September 1972
31	4	"Confined Panic"	Unknown	Unknown	2 October 1972
32	5	"The Caller"	Gerald Mayer	Arthur Weiss	9 October 1972
33	6	"Blackmail"	Unknown	Unknown	16 October 1972
34	7	"Summer Sunday"	Unknown	Unknown	23 October 1972
35	8	"Crossfire"	John Meredyth Lucas	Maureen Daly	30 October 1972
36	9	"Time Out"	Unknown	Unknown	6 November 1972
37	10	"High Tension"	John Meredyth Lucas	John Meredyth Lucas	13 November 1972
38	11	"Night Watch"	Unknown	Unknown	20 November 1972
39	12	"No Place to Hide"	Unknown	Unknown	27 November 1972
40	13	"One Way to Heaven"	Unknown	Unknown	4 December 1972
41	14	"Bust Out"	Eric Till	Mort Forer	11 December 1972
42	15	"Shadows"	Unknown	Unknown	18 December 1972
43	16	"Castle Queen"	Unknown	Unknown	1 January 1973
44	17	"Veil of Death"	Unknown	Unknown	8 January 1973
45	18	"Assassin"	John Meredyth Lucas	Jack Guss	15 January 1973
46	19	"A Deadly Favor"	Unknown	Unknown	22 January 1973
47	20	"Requiem for a Canary"	John Meredyth Lucas and Brian Walker	Chester Krumholz and Wilton Schiller	29 January 1973
48	21	"4th and Cherry: Code Three"	Gerald Mayer and Brian Walker	Howard Dimsdale	5 February 1973
49	22	"Death in the Last Row"	John Meredyth Lucas	Sam Ross	12 February 1973
50	23	"Kill the Apple Tree"	Gerald Mayer and Brian Walker	Oliver Crawford	19 February 1973
51	24	"Ordeal"	John Meredyth Lucas and Brian Walker	Maureen Daly	26 February 1973
52	25	"A Bullet for the General"	Gerald Mayer	Jonah Royston	5 March 1973
53	26	"Death Holds an Auction"	John Meredyth Lucas and Brian Walker	Mort Forer and Marian Waldman	12 March 1973

=== Season 3: 1973–74 ===
No. overall	No. in season	Title	Directed by	Written by	Original release date
54	1	"Ticket to Nowhere"	John Meredyth Lucas	Wallace Bennett	10 September 1973
55	2	"An Equal Right to Die"	Gerald Mayer	Chester Krumholz and Wilton Schiller	17 September 1973
56	3	"The Judas Goat of Ebony Street"	Gerald Mayer	Chester Krumholz and Wilton Schiller	24 September 1973
57	4	"Star Witness"	John Meredyth Lucas	Theodore Apstein	1 October 1973
58	5	"Killing Favors"	Gerald Mayer	Arthur Weiss	8 October 1973
59	6	"Losers, Weepers"	Gerald Mayer	Kevin De Courcey	15 October 1973
60	7	"Body Count"	John Meredyth Lucas	Chester Krumholz and Wilton Schiller	22 October 1973
61	8	"Deadly Exchange"	John Meredyth Lucas	Maureen Daly	29 October 1973
62	9	"A Very Quiet Street"	John Meredyth Lucas	Jim Carlson	5 November 1973
63	10	"Kiss and Kill"	John Meredyth Lucas	Oliver Crawford	12 November 1973
64	11	"Dark Pages"	Gerald Mayer	Chester Krumholz and Wilton Schiller	19 November 1973
65	12	"For an Encore, Murder"	John Meredyth Lucas	Randy Kreuger, Chester Krumholz, Wilton Schiller	26 November 1973
66	13	"Lies"	Unknown	Unknown	3 December 1973
67	14	"Vengeance"	Gerald Mayer	Chester Krumholz and Wilton Schiller	10 December 1973
68	15	"At the Stroke of Death"	Gerald Mayer	Chester Krumholz, Marjorie Priest, and Wilton Schiller	17 December 1973
69	16	"Dangerous Windfall"	Gerald Mayer	Calvin Clements Jr.	31 December 1973
70	17	"Smash Up"	John Meredyth Lucas	John Meredyth Lucas	7 January 1974
71	18	"A Taste of the Sun"	John Meredyth Lucas	Bryan Barney and Kaino Thomas	14 January 1974
72	19	"North Light"	John Meredyth Lucas	Story by : Martin Leager; Teleplay by : Lew Lehman	21 January 1974
73	20	"The Importer"	John Meredyth Lucas	Helen French, Chester Krumholz, and Wilton Schiller	28 January 1974
74	21	"House Guest"	Eric Till	Kaino Thomas	4 February 1974
75	22	"Portrait of Florenza"	John Meredyth Lucas	Garard Banning and Mel Goldberg	11 February 1974
76	23	"Man Outside"	Peter Carter	Mel Goldberg, Chester Krumholz, and Wilton Schiller	18 February 1974
77	24	"Borrowed Trouble"	John Meredyth Lucas	Susanne K. Burnie, Chester Krumholz, and Wilton Schiller	25 February 1974
78	25	"A Bagfull of Dreams"	Eric Till	Chester Krumholz, Lew Lehman, Jonah Royston, and Wilton Schiller	4 March 1974
79	26	"A Sound from Edward Sanchez"	Unknown	Unknown	11 March 1974

=== Season 4: 1974–75 ===
No. overall	No. in season	Title	Directed by	Written by	Original release date
80	1	"He Is Among Us"	John Meredyth Lucas	Phyllis White and Robert White	5 September 1974
81	2	"Man in the Middle"	John Meredyth Lucas	Phyllis White and Robert White	12 September 1974
82	3	"Secrets"	John Meredyth Lucas	Lou Shaw	19 September 1974
83	4	"Target: Ms. Blue"	Peter Carter	Maureen Daly	26 September 1974
84	5	"The Militant"	Peter Carter	Fred Freiberger	3 October 1974
85	6	"Bad Apple"	John Meredyth Lucas	Howard Dimsdale, Chester Krumholz, and Wilton Schiller	10 October 1974
86	7	"No More Brass Bands"	Peter Carter	San Ross	17 October 1974
87	8	"Final Approach"	John Meredyth Lucas	Donald Jack	24 October 1974
88	9	"Fatal Deception"	Peter Carter	Wallace Bennett	31 October 1974
89	10	"The Killer"	John Meredyth Lucas	Chester Krumholz, Barry Pearson, Wilton Schiller, and Kaino Thomas	7 November 1974
90	11	"Lady Be Dead"	Peter Carter	Kaino Thomas	14 November 1974
91	12	"The Loser"	Peter Carter	Oliver Crawford	21 November 1974
92	13	"Stairwell"	Peter Carter	E. Jack Kaplan	28 November 1974
93	14	"Time Bomb"	Peter Carter	Robert Hamner	5 December 1974
94	15	"My Son, My Son"	John Meredyth Lucas	Gerard Banning and Mel Goldberg	12 December 1974
95	16	"Cry Murder"	John Meredyth Lucas	George Salverson	19 December 1974
96	17	"Requiem for an Animal"	John Meredyth Lucas	Robert Hamner, Chester Krumholz, Wilton Schiller, and Kaino Thomas	2 January 1975
97	18	"Mannequin"	Gerald Mayer	Chester Krumholz, Wilton Schiller, and Lou Shaw	9 January 1975
98	19	"Insight to Murder"	Peter Carter	Jim Carlson	16 January 1975
99	20	"Web of Guilt"	Gerald Mayer	Kaino Thomas	23 January 1975
100	21	"Vanished"	John Meredyth Lucas	Mort Forer	30 January 1975
101	22	"Angel of Mercy"	John Meredyth Lucas	John Meredyth Lucas	6 February 1975
102	23	"Run Harry Run"	John Meredyth Lucas	Jonah Royston and Kaino Thomas	13 February 1975
103	24	"Pint of Friendship"	John Meredyth Lucas	Chester Krumholz, Martin Roth, and Wilton Schiller	20 February 1975
104	25	"Halfway House"	Gerald Mayer	Lew Lehman	27 February 1975
105	26	"Sing a Sad Song"	Peter Carter	Jim Carlson	6 March 1975

== Syndication/current airings ==
While this series appeared on some stations in Canada in syndication, CTV, which co-produced this series under network president Murray Chercover, did not offer this series to its affiliates until 1972, when the show became Police Surgeon.

In December 2014, it was announced that the Retro Television Network would begin broadcasting reruns of Police Surgeon.

As of December 2023, the series was dropped from their schedule. https://www.tvpassport.com/tv-listings/stations/retro-tv-network/14646/2023-12-30

== Filming locations ==
Most of the filming of the original Season One episodes set in the fictional town of "Dixon Mills" took place in the village of Kleinburg, and surrounding Nashville and Vaughan areas of Ontario, often along more rural countryside roads. A number of episodes featured scenes filmed along Kirby Road and at the bowstring arch bridge by the Humber River in the Nashville Conservation Reserve. One episode "Crash" was filmed along present day Rutherford Road near Pine Valley Drive, another, "Two Points of a Pitchfork" used the Humber River bridge along Huntington Road north of Kirby Road as the checkpoint into town during a Typhus outbreak. "Hero" featured the Card Lumber yard in the Nashville area of Kleinburg. Rural patient visits were often to real farmhouses in the area, used for filming.

Some episodes in Season One, notably the winter ones, were filmed in the Rouge Park/Scarborough area of Toronto. In those, the Valley Halla Estate house (now part of the Toronto Zoo grounds) was featured as the doctor's office and residence building. One episode from season 1 was shot at the old Markham, Ontario water tower in a story involving a mute boy who dangerously climbs the tower. Other winter season 1 scenes were shot at Highland Creek in Scarborough, Ontario, and at the old ski hill on Twyn Rivers Road in Pickering, Ontario.

Starting in the second season when the series was renamed and moved to a big-city setting, the filming moved strictly to Toronto (although Toronto wasn't specifically mentioned in the show as the setting). Much of the filming took place in the Etobicoke area, usually in various Mimico and New Toronto neighbourhoods, plazas, industrial areas and train yards. A lot of the stock footage of the ambulance van driving on the highway was filmed along the Gardiner Expressway around Sunnyside and downtown Toronto. One episode featured scenes shot inside Westwood Theatre, another a ride on a Gray Coach bus along the Gardiner Expressway. Many of the street scenes were filmed along Lake Shore Blvd West around the motel strip area, including footage shot in and around the Westpoint Motor Hotel & Restaurant, Dutch Sisters Inn, and the Seaway Towers Motor Hotel. The train yard footage was taken in and around CN's Mimico train yard.
