= Uptown Theatre (Toronto) =

Former cinema in Toronto, Ontario, Canada

Coordinates: 43.669490°N 79.386744°W

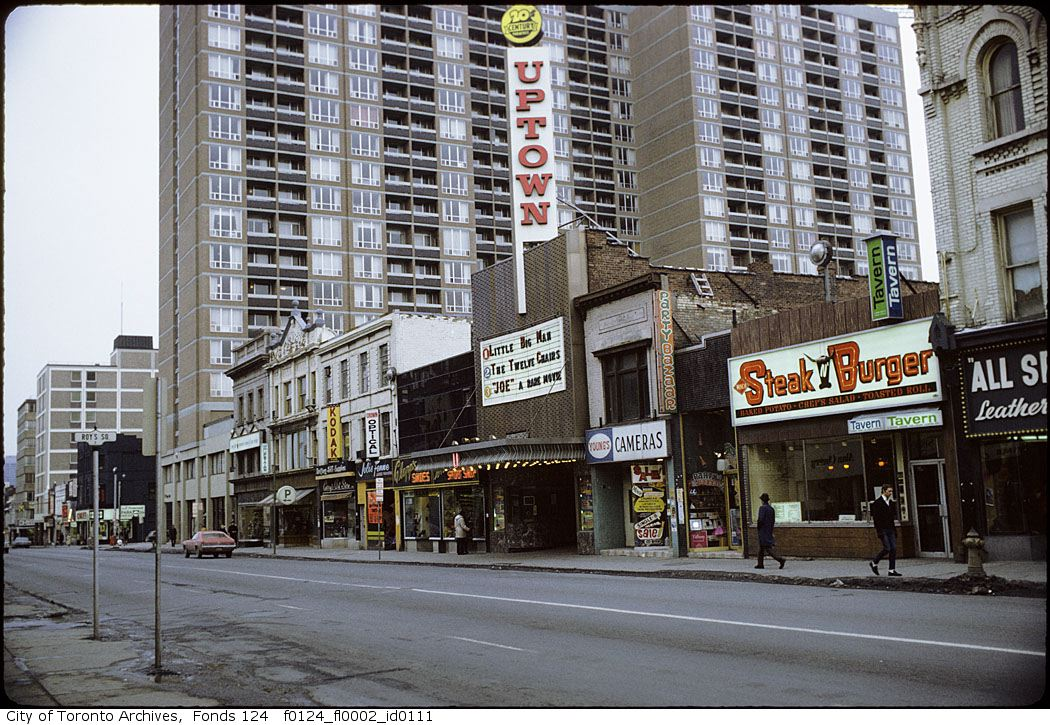
The Uptown Theatre in February 1971

The Uptown Theatre was a historic movie theatre in Toronto, Ontario which was demolished in 2003. The entrance to the theatre was located on Yonge Street just south of Bloor. Like many theatres of the time (including the Elgin & Winter Garden Theatre) it was constructed so that only the entrance was on a major thoroughfare while the main building fronted on a side street. A bridge connected the two buildings.

== Early history ==
The 3000-seat theatre opened as Loew's Uptown Theatre in 1920, originally serving as a venue for both vaudeville and films. It was designed by acclaimed theatre designer Thomas W. Lamb. Although built for different chains, the Uptown Theatre and Pantages Theatre (today's Ed Mirvish Theatre) were sisters, designed by the same architect, and opened less than a month apart. The Uptown was smaller than the Pantages and with a much smaller lobby, but the two had similar Yonge Street entrances and their auditoriums were of the same style. The original paint colours for the auditorium were rose, grey and gold. For several years noted choreographer Leon Leonidoff was employed by the theatre. It was at the Uptown that Leonidoff developed the style that he would later give Radio City Music Hall's Rockettes. The name Uptown was fitting for its time, as downtown Toronto in 1920 did not extend much north of Queen Street.

== The 1960s, 70s, and 80s ==
In 1960 the Uptown was damaged by fire, fueled by extremely flammable material on the seats. The theatre was quickly restored, but all the original ornate plasterwork in the dome, proscenium arch, boxes, and organ grilles was lost, being replaced by only smooth plaster and drapery. Theatre owner Nat Taylor closed the cinema on September 5, 1969, and renovated it, dividing the Uptown into five theatres, one of the world's first multiplexes. The architect for the multiplexing project was Toronto architect Mandel Sprachman, who later did many similar projects for rival Famous Players across Canada, including the Uptown's sister, the Imperial (now a live theatre, the Ed Mirvish Theatre). On December 25, 1969, the rebuilt facility opened. The Uptown 1 on the original balcony now sat 1000, and was one of the earliest instances of an all stadium seating auditorium in a cinema. Uptown 2 and 3 were the original main floor seating divided by a partition wall down the middle. Uptown Backstage 1 and 2 were built in the original stage house and could only be accessed through a separate entrance and box office on Balmuto Street. The Uptown 1, 2, and 3 played all the major releases, while the Uptown Backstage 1 and 2 usually played "art" films, such as extremely long runs of A Clockwork Orange and The Gods Must Be Crazy during the 1970s. Eventually the Backstage dropped the word "Uptown" and was considered a separate cinema.

In the mid 1970s, Nat Taylor sold his chain of theatres known as "Twentieth Century Theatres" (no relation to the studio) to Famous Players, including the Uptown and the Yonge Theatre (later renamed the Elgin). Mr. Taylor would later found a new chain of multiplex cinemas in 1979 with Garth Drabinsky, called Cineplex Entertainment.

The Uptown was a favourite place to see films, always doing good business. It was the last remaining large-audience big-screen, old-style movie theatre still operating in downtown Toronto for Famous Players. In addition to the sudden closure of another major downtown historic Famous Players movie theatre, the Imperial Six, in 1986, many other Famous Players theatres in the Yonge and Bloor area closed during the 1980s, including The Plaza 1 and 2 Cinemas in the Hudson's Bay Centre and the University Theatre on Bloor Street West. Following the loss of the Imperial in 1986, the Uptown became the theatre of choice for many movie goers in downtown Toronto and regularly played midnight shows on the weekend. The Uptown was also an important venue for the Toronto International Film Festival.

== Demise ==
In 2001 new regulations mandated that the theatre be made wheelchair accessible. Famous Players balked at paying to estimated $700,000 expense and announced that they would be closing the cinema. The five screen cinema made little financial sense in the era of megaplexes, especially when the land it was on was worth millions of dollars. Despite community protests the cinema was closed on September 14, 2003 immediately after the 2003 TIFF. The last film to be shown there was Undead.

== Demolition and redevelopment ==
The site was sold to developers who planned to replace it with a condo. In December 2003 Priestly Demolition was engaged in demolishing the structure, when a large section of the building collapsed. An operator cut vital steel support beams on a roof truss. The roof suddenly collapsed onto the balcony structure below, pushing out the brick exterior walls. No workers were hurt, but parts of the brick walls fell on the neighbouring Yorkville English Academy. Fourteen people in the school were injured and one, Augusto Mejia Solis, a 27-year-old Costa Rican, was killed. In April 2004, five civil lawsuits were filed against Priestly Demolition and property owner Marco Muzzo. After a government investigation lasting almost a year, six charges were laid in the incident including failure to take the reasonable precaution of ensuring that a competent person inspected the internal roof structure before removing the main roof truss.

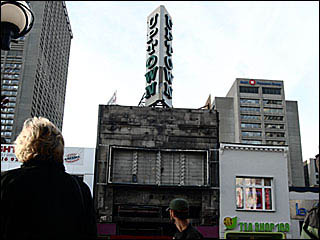
Yonge Street entrance

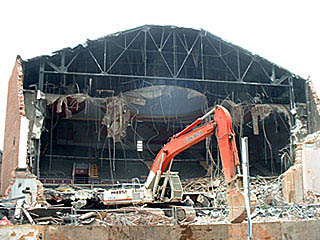
Demolition

Demolition

The Uptown Residences, a 48-storey, 284 suite condo was completed on the site of the former theatre in 2011. A small portion of the lobby facing Yonge Street remains.

== Other Thomas Lamb theatres in Canada ==
- Elgin & Winter Garden Theatre, Toronto
- Ed Mirvish Theatre, Toronto
- Capitol Cinema, Ottawa

== See also ==
- List of cinemas in Toronto
