= Royal Cinema =

Cinema and event venue in Toronto, Ontario, Canada

Coordinates: 43.6549698°N 79.4150322°W

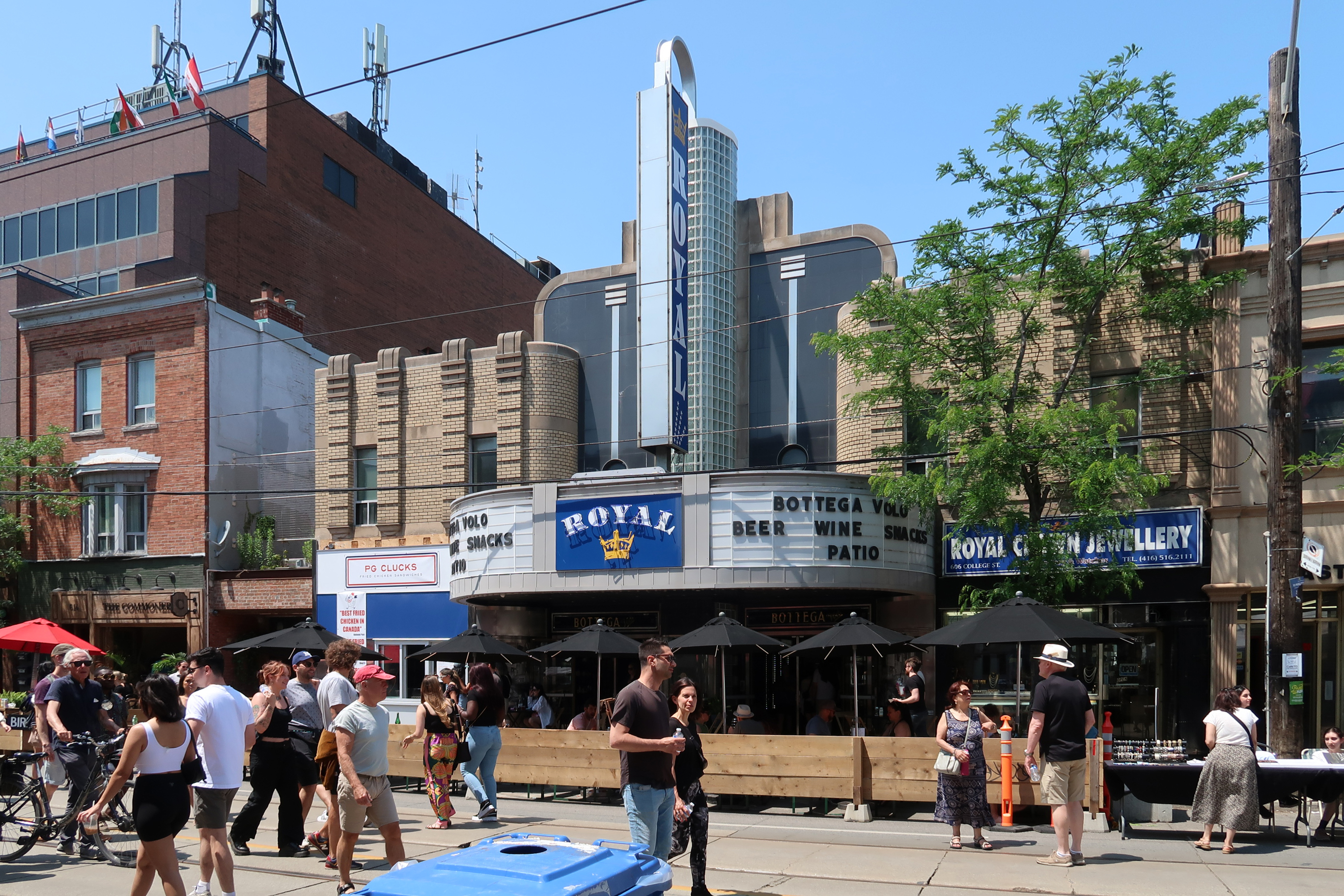
- The Royal Cinema in 2023.

- Location of The Royal in Toronto
- Former names: The Pylon; The Golden Princess
- Address: 608 College Street; Toronto, Ontario; Canada
- Capacity: 390

Construction
- Opened: 1939
- Architect: Benjamin Swartz

Website
- theroyal.to

The Royal Cinema is an Art Moderne event venue and cinema in Toronto, Ontario, Canada. It was built in 1939 and owned by Miss Ray Levinsky.

When it was built in 1939, it was called The Pylon, with an accompanying large sign at the front of the theatre. It included a roller-skating rink at the rear of the theatre, and a dance hall on the second floor.

In the 1950s, the theatre was purchased by Rocco Mastrangelo. In the 1990s, the theatre was renamed The Golden Princess.

Since early 2007, Theatre D has owned and operated The Royal. During the daytime, it operates as a film and television post-production studio. It hosts film festivals, including the European Union Film Festival, Caribbean Tales International Film Festival and Japanese Movie Week.

The Royal is featured in the 2013 film The F Word, the 2011 film Take This Waltz, and the 2022 film Tehranto.

== See also ==
- List of cinemas in Toronto
