= Roxy Theatre (Toronto) =

Former theatre in Toronto, Ontario, Canada

Coordinates: 43.68145°N 79.33165°W

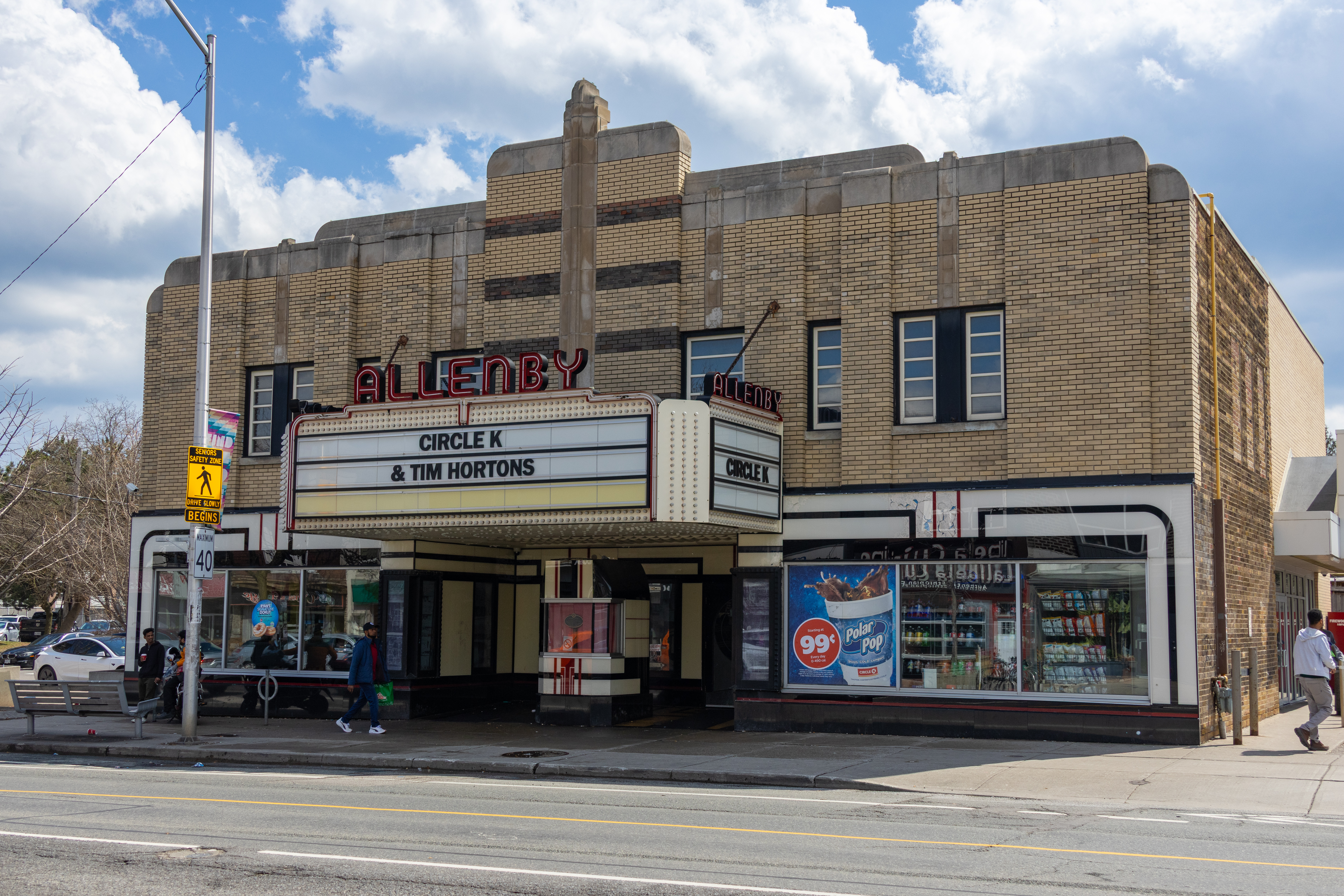
- Allenby Theatre in 2026

General information
- Location: 1195 Danforth Avenue, Toronto, Ontario, Canada
- Opened: 1935
- Closed: 2006

Other information
- Public transit: Greenwood station

The Roxy Theatre operated from 1935 to 2006 at 1215 Danforth Avenue, in Toronto, Ontario, Canada's east end. It was designed by the architectural firm Kaplan & Sprachman, which designed dozens of neighbourhood cinemas, and opened under the name Allenby Theatre.

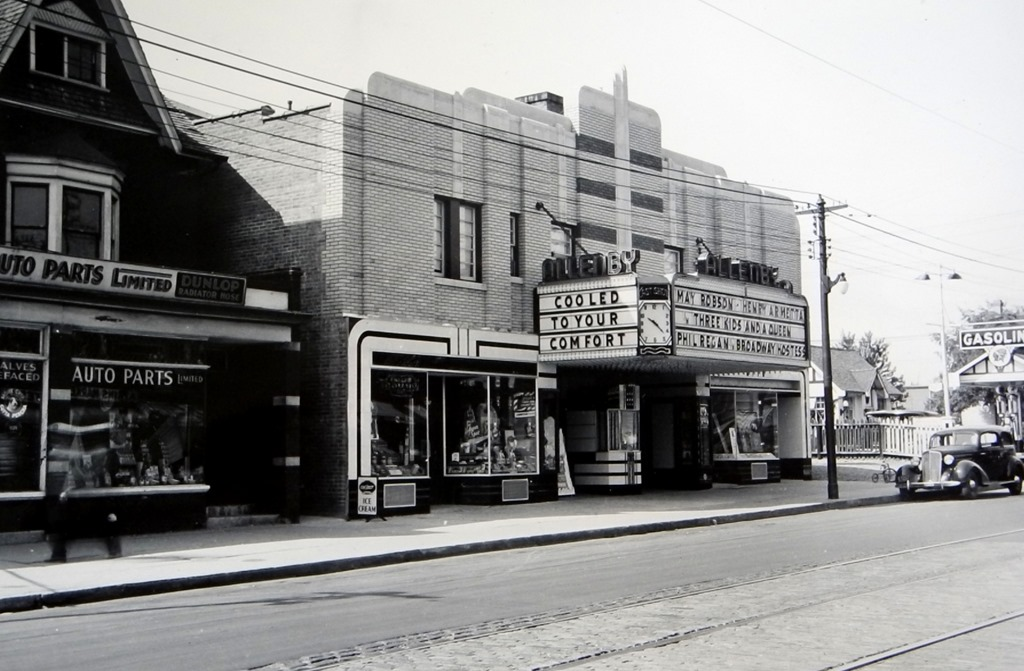
Allenby Theatre, in 1936.

In the 1930s the Allenby allowed neighbourhood children to enroll in the Popeye Club, where they could watch a double bill, and two episodes of the Popeye cartoon serials, for ten cents.

In 1970, before the theatre was renamed to the Roxy, it operated as the Apollo Theatre and played Greek language films. The Apollo operated only for a few months.

During the 1970s, the theatre was run by Gary Topp and Jeff Silverman, reported to have introduced midnight screenings to Toronto. It was the first theatre to play daring films, like John Waters' Pink Flamingos. In addition to serving as a repertory cinema, the location was an early venue for the performance of punk rock.

In its first five months, the Roxy showed high-quality Japanese films which did not attract enough customers. It then changed the program. Dubbed "The Original 99 Cent Roxy", the theatre offered art films and double-bills for older customers on weekdays, and rock-music films for younger customers on weekends.

The Roxy is known for playing cult-classic Rocky Horror Picture Show, every week, from 1976 to 1983. Some customers came in costumes inspired by the film, and theatre management encouraged staff to do the same.

The Roxy technically upgraded its equipment and was among the first in Canada to have an optical Dolby Stereo sound system.

In later years the theatre was one of the Festival chain of repertory cinemas of similar age. In 1985, the city added the theatre to its inventory of heritage properties.

In 1987, the theatre was sold and became the Hollywood Dinner Theatre, an after-hours club. Between 1990 and 1993, police were called to the club for 70 major incidents. The club had numerous infractions, and Toronto City Council asked the Ontario Liquor Control Board to reject any future requests for a liquor licence.

Later the theatre became an Indian theatre and banquet hall. The walls had hand-painted Indiana Jones and Star Wars murals.

The building was purchased by Imperial Oil in 2006. The bulk of the building including a second-floor apartment was demolished in November 2009, and an Esso gas station, convenience store, and Tim Hortons were constructed on the site. Only the theatre façade was retained.

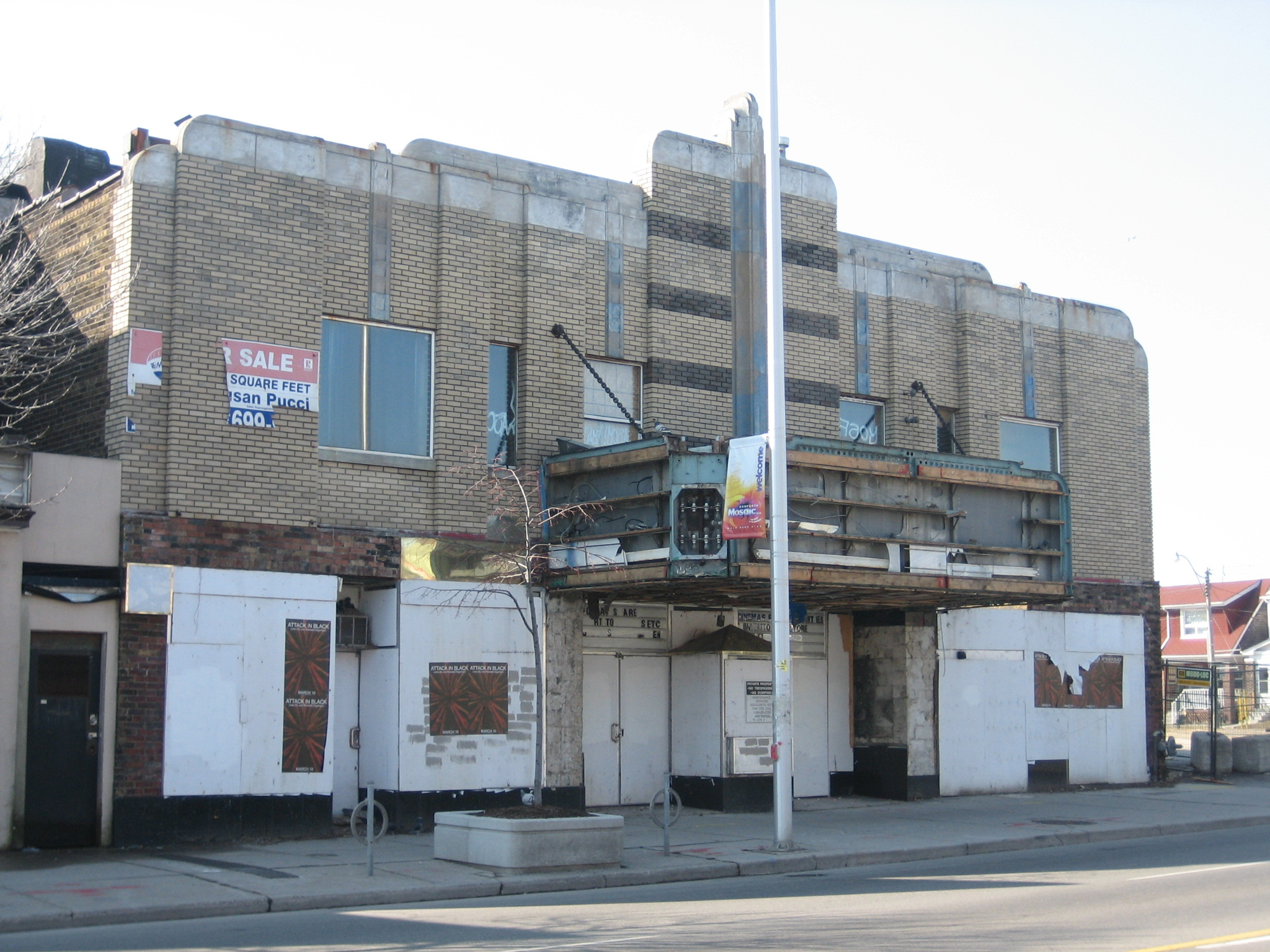
Shell of the theatre, in 2009.

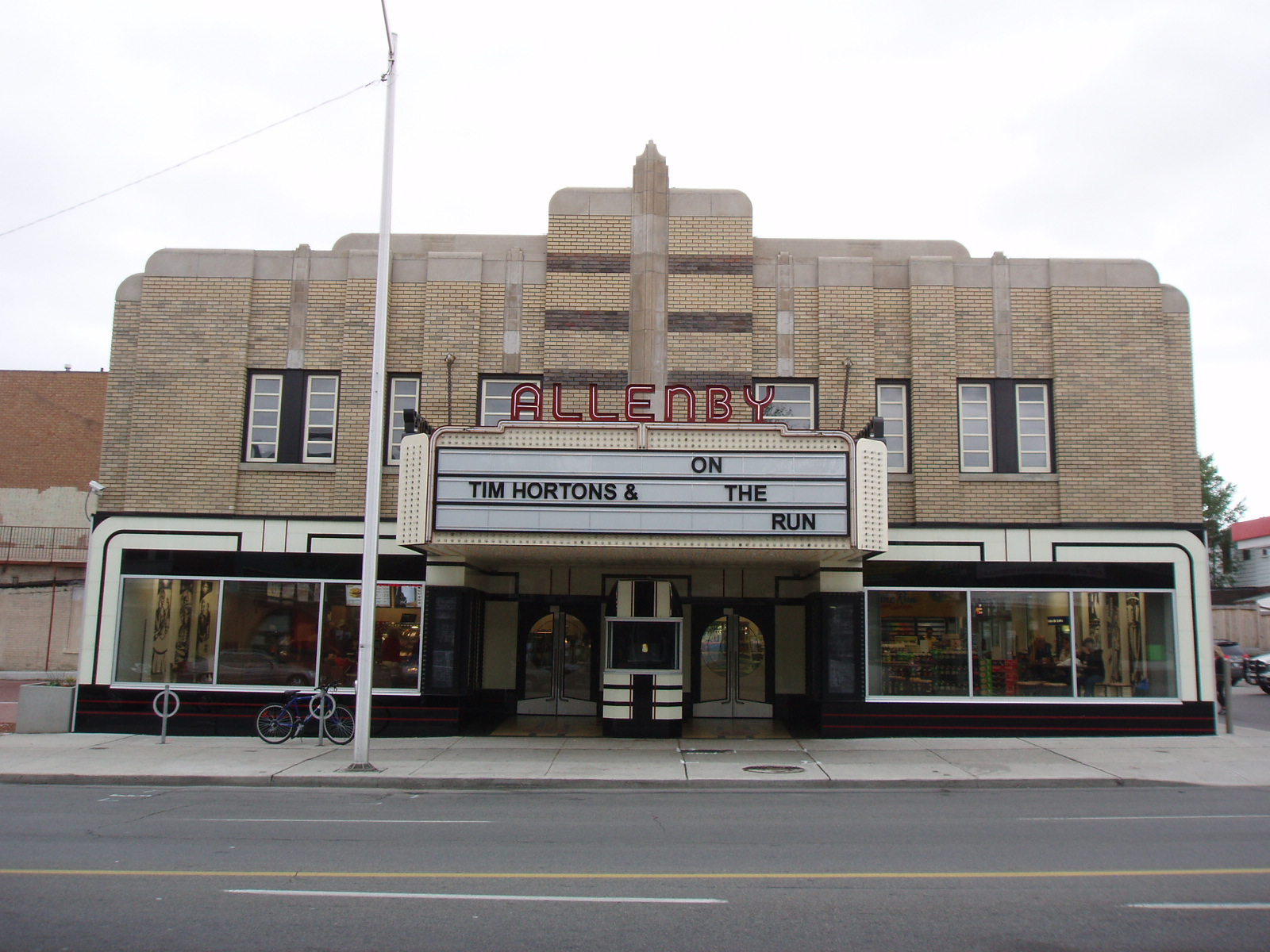
Restored façade of Allenby (later Roxy) Theatre in 2012.

The building's Art Deco façade earned it a listing as a building of heritage interest. This designation, short of a full heritage designation, only preserved its façade. ERA Architects led the effort to restore the façade, and readapt the former auditorium space. The building had stood vacant, for several years, making the work of conservators more difficult. The façade of the building was restored with an Allenby Theatre marquee, including its ticket booth. Conservation work included masonry restoration of the façade, repair of the marquee structure, restoration of the vitrolite glass on ground floor windows, repair of the terrazzo floors, repair of the lobby's exterior ceiling and rebuilding the sign boxes based on historic photographs. The marquee and ticket booth are reproductions. A commemorative plaque was installed on the building with its designation as a heritage site, and historical photos are featured inside.

== See also ==
- List of cinemas in Toronto
