= University Theatre (Toronto) =

Coordinates: 43.669636°N 79.391500°W

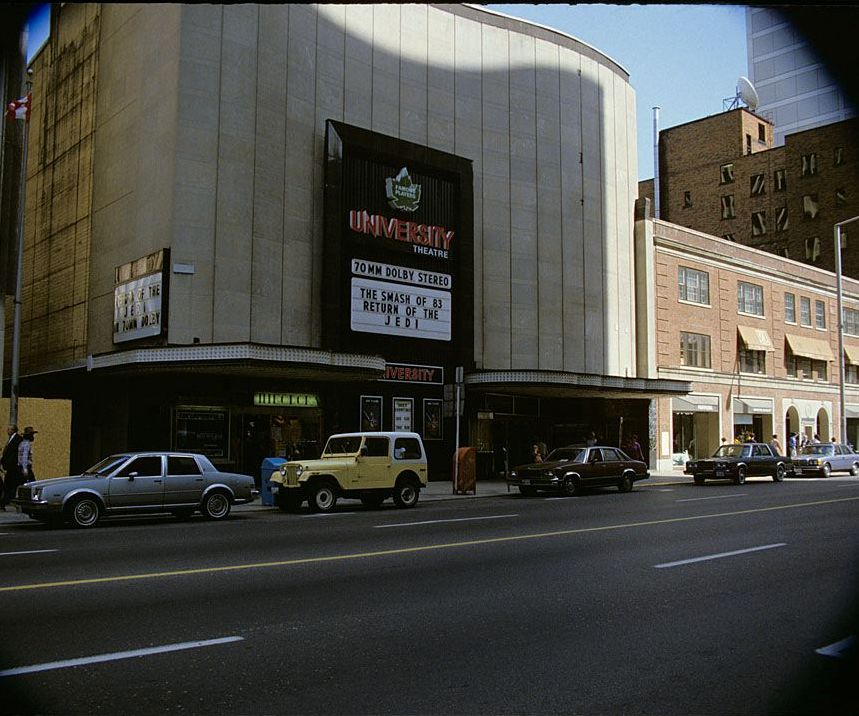
- Return of the Jedi showing at the University Theatre, with the marquee stating "The Smash of 83"
- Interactive map of University Theatre
- Address: 100 Bloor Street; Toronto, Ontario; Canada
- Operator: Famous Players Theatres
- Capacity: 1,300
- Type: Cinema

Construction
- Years active: 1949–1986
- Architect: Eric Wilfrid Hounsom

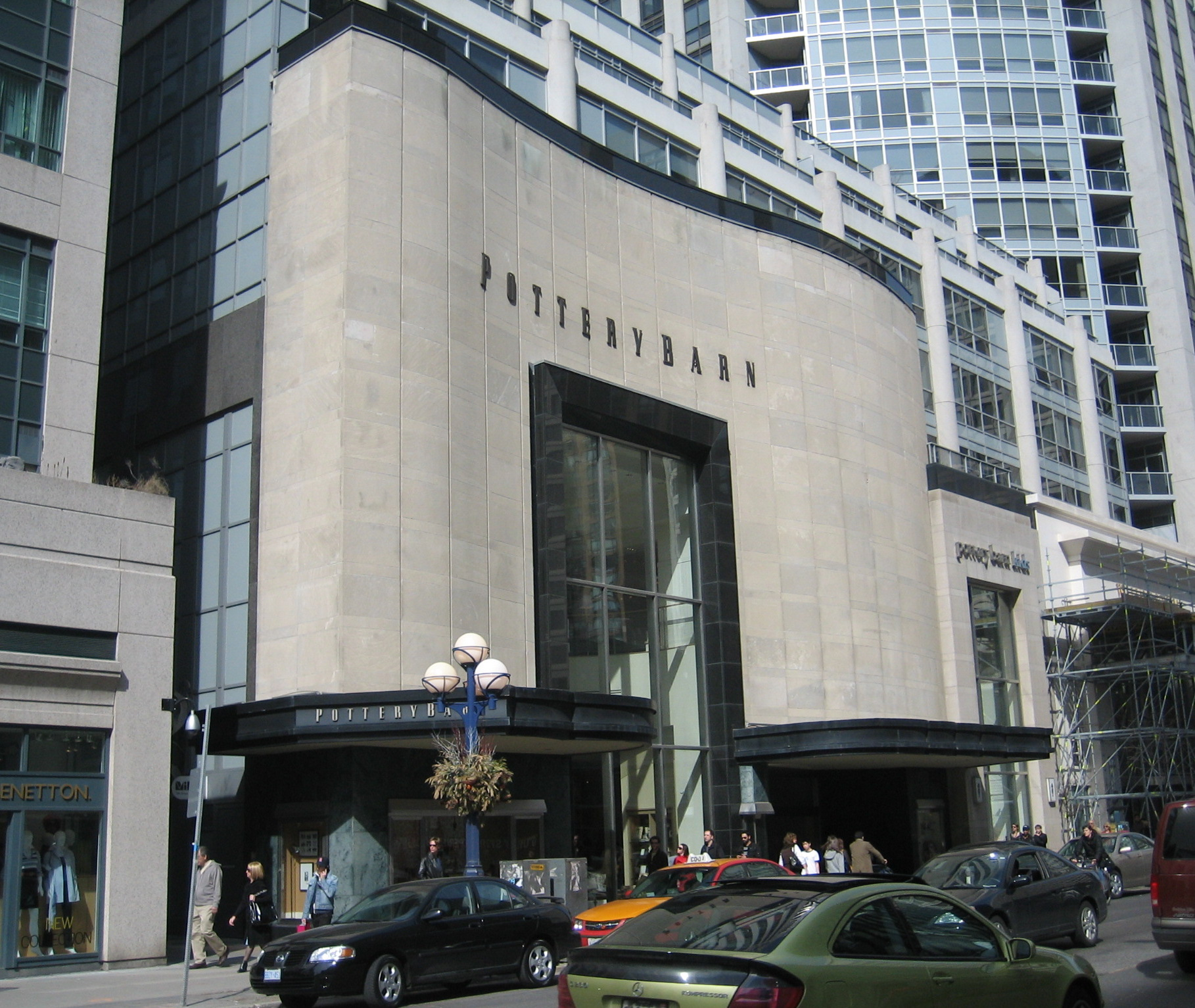
The University Theatre facade for the Williams-Sonoma & Pottery Barn store

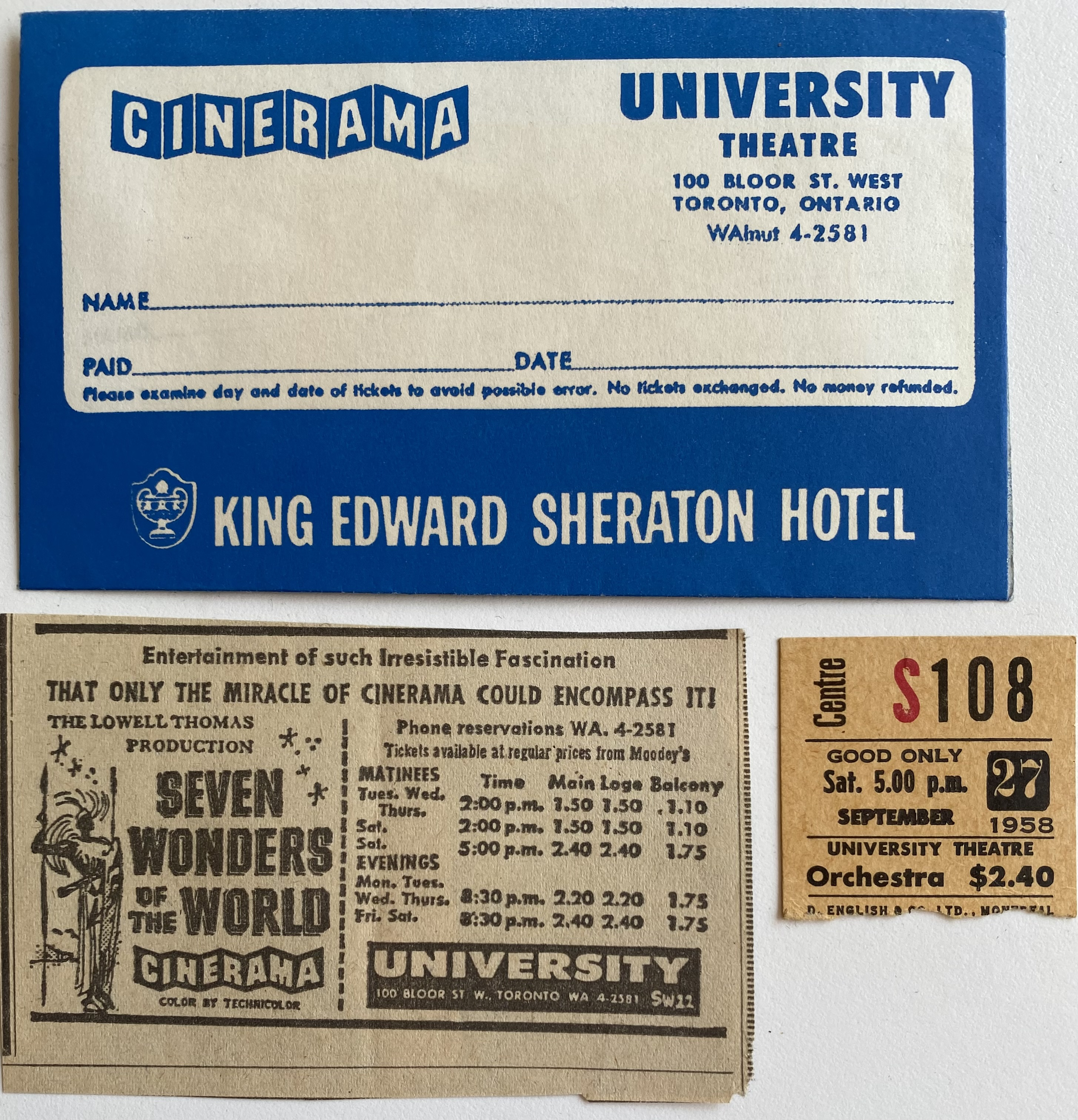
A ticket stub, advertisement, and hotel ticket envelope for a 1958 showing of "Seven Wonders of the World" at the University Theatre.

The University Theatre was a single-screen cinema located at 100 Bloor Street West along the Mink Mile, just west of Bay Street in Toronto, Ontario, Canada. The area was once home to a number of cinemas, most notably the Uptown Theatre.

For several decades, it was one of the premier movie cinemas in Toronto, and was a centre for the Festival of Festivals. At the time of its closing, it was the largest movie house in Canada.

== Operating history ==
The University Theatre opened on 25 March 1949, and aimed to be the premier cinema in the city. It was a single screen theatre with seating for 1300 people. The cinema would host many of the most important films of its day. For major productions it would use reserved seating where patrons would buy specific seats ahead of time. The cinema also helped introduce new technologies to Toronto such as CinemaScope, Cinerama and 70 mm film Dolby Stereo.

== Demise and demolition ==
In 1985, Famous Players Realty Investments Inc. – not to be confused with their tenant Famous Players – announced plans to demolish the theatre and build a condo residential complex with a cinema. Its closing was delayed several times, with the Famous Players theatre chain trying, but not able, to sign a long-term lease. It shuttered soon after the 1986 film festival, where it hosted the gala opening screening of The Decline of the American Empire.

Despite the closure, it was agreed that the unique facade of the building would be preserved. When the theatre was torn down the front wall was left standing with a scaffolding at the rear supporting it. These supports were meant to be temporary but were left in place for over a decade due to the early 1990s recession.

== Location redevelopment ==
With the revival of the property market in the late 1990s, developments were again proposed for the site. The first plan called for a new 3100-seat multiplex cinema to be topped with a 150-unit condominium tower. However, the cinema plans were abandoned and the building was constructed with retail along Bloor Street. The University Theatre's facade now serves as an entrance to a two-level store space, which was a Williams-Sonoma and Pottery Barn from 2002 to 2015.

== See also ==
- List of cinemas in Toronto
