= Shea's Hippodrome =

Theatre and cinema in Toronto, Canada

- 'The Hipp'
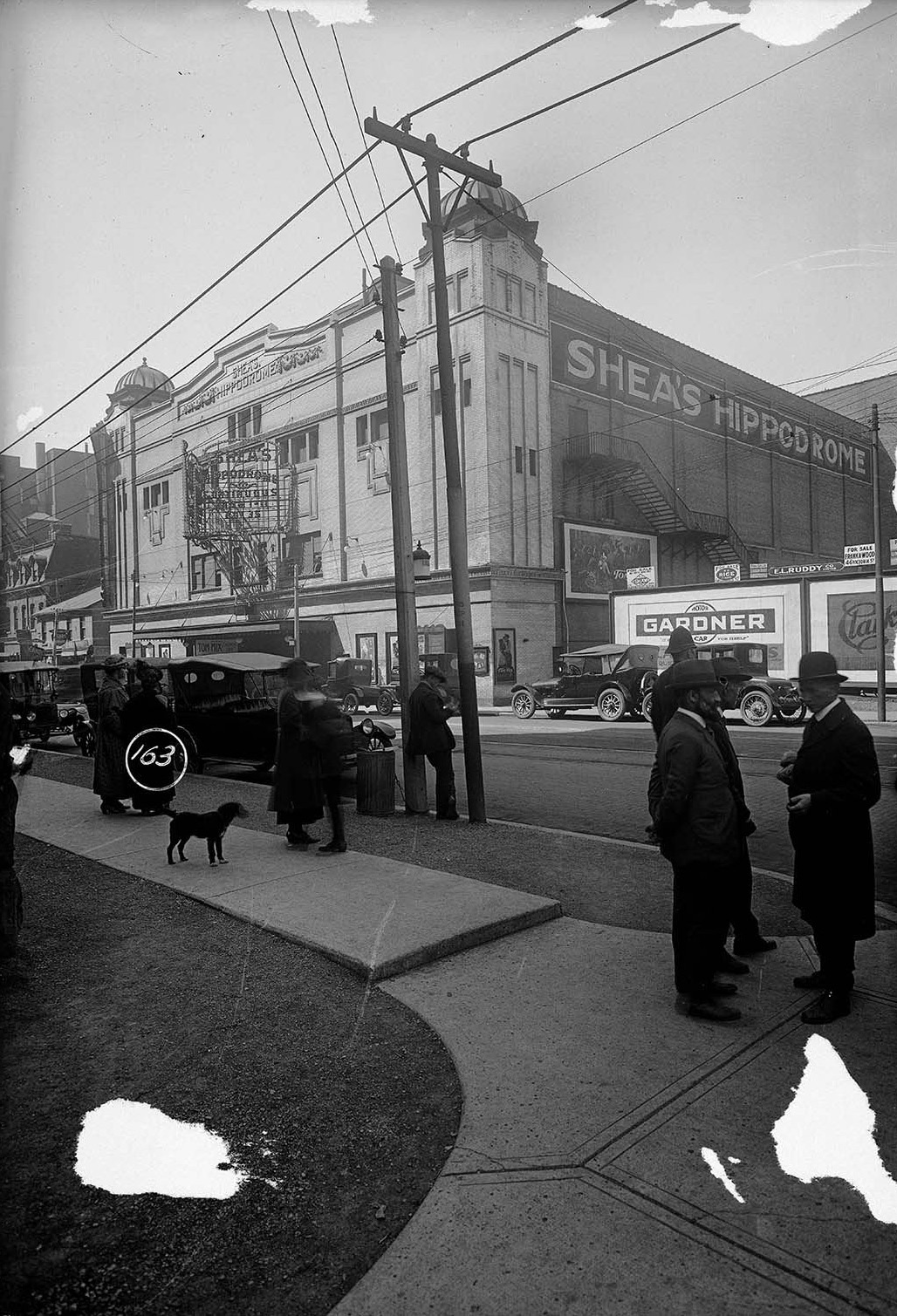
- Shea's Hippodrome in 1921
- Interactive map of Shea's Hippodrome
- Address: Teraulay Street (renamed 440 Bay Street)
- Location: Albert and Teraulay streets Toronto, Ontario
- Coordinates: 43.652613°N 79.382709°W
- Owner: Jerry and Michael Shea
- Operator: Famous Players
- Capacity: 3,200
- Current use: public square

Construction
- Opened: April 27, 1914
- Closed: December 27, 1956
- Demolished: 1957
- Cost: CA$245,000 (equivalent to $6,704,833 in 2025)
- Architect: L.H. Lempert

Shea's Hippodrome was a historic film and vaudeville theatre in Toronto, Ontario, Canada. The Hippodrome was located in downtown Toronto, at the southwest corner of Albert and Teraulay streets (now Nathan Phillips Square). At its opening in 1914, it was the largest movie palace in Canada, and one of the largest vaudeville theatres in the world. The Hippodrome included 12 opera boxes, a Wurlitzer organ, as well as a full-size orchestra pit. It debuted some of Canada's first non-silent films. It was built by brothers Jerry and Michael Shea and situated directly across from Toronto's (now former) City Hall. The Hippodrome was operated by Famous Players and managed for decades by Leonard N. Bishop. It closed in 1956 and was demolished in 1957 to make way for Toronto's new City Hall.

== Venue ==
Prior to building Shea's Hippodrome, the Shea brothers first took over and operated the former Robinson's Musee Theatre (also known as the "Bijou") as "Shea's Yonge Street" (also known as the "Strand") in 1899. The brothers then built "Shea's Victoria" nearby.

Shea's Hippodrome was constructed in the Renaissance style, with arched (and 'electrified') ceilings. The theatre featured an allegorical painting by George Brant, and uniquely included a coin-operated candy dispenser. Historically, a hippodrome is a large, circular ancient Greek theatre. Though Shea's Hippodrome was not round, the word was sometimes adopted for large theatres at the time.

Before installing a Wurlitzer organ in 1926, Shea's included an Orchestron machine, a punch-tape programmed precursor to a modern synthesizer. House organists included Kathleen Stokes, Colin Corbett, Quentin Maclean and Al Bollington.

== Entertainments ==
=== Vaudeville ===
'The Hipp' was on the Family Time, and later the Super Time, vaudeville circuits. It hosted many of the world's greatest vaudeville acts, including:

- Bob Hope
- Edgar Bergen
- George Burns
- Gracie Allen
- Red Skelton
- Bennie Fields
- Blossom Seeley
- Jimmy Durante
- Ben Blue
- Helen Kane
- Jack Benny
- Maurice Chevalier
- Fanny Brice
- Burns & Allen
- George Jessel
- Guy Lombardo
- Cab Calloway

=== Films ===
In 1924, Shea's debuted its first 'talkie' – a non-silent film, called a 'phonofilm'. The first talkie was called The Studio Murder Mystery. Originally thought to be a novelty, talkies later became the main source of income for supporting the declining vaudeville revenue.

Over the years, Shea's screened films such as The Ten Commandments and many of Elvis Presley's movies. In 1941, the Abbott and Costello film Buck Privates played for a record 14 weeks. When it closed, it was only used as a first-run film theatre by Famous Players.

== Closing ==
Shea's Hippodrome was one of the last remaining vaudeville theatres in North America to remain open after World War II. Purchase of the site by the City of Toronto was approved in 1947, part of the whole block slated for a new civic center. The theatre received notice in 1956 to close. The theatre closed just after Christmas in 1956.

The Wurlitzer organ was sold to Maple Leaf Gardens. Its large size and complexity meant it took some time to be disassembled. It was later sold to Casa Loma. Toronto's replacement 'civic center' was not completed until 1965.
