= Joy Theatre =

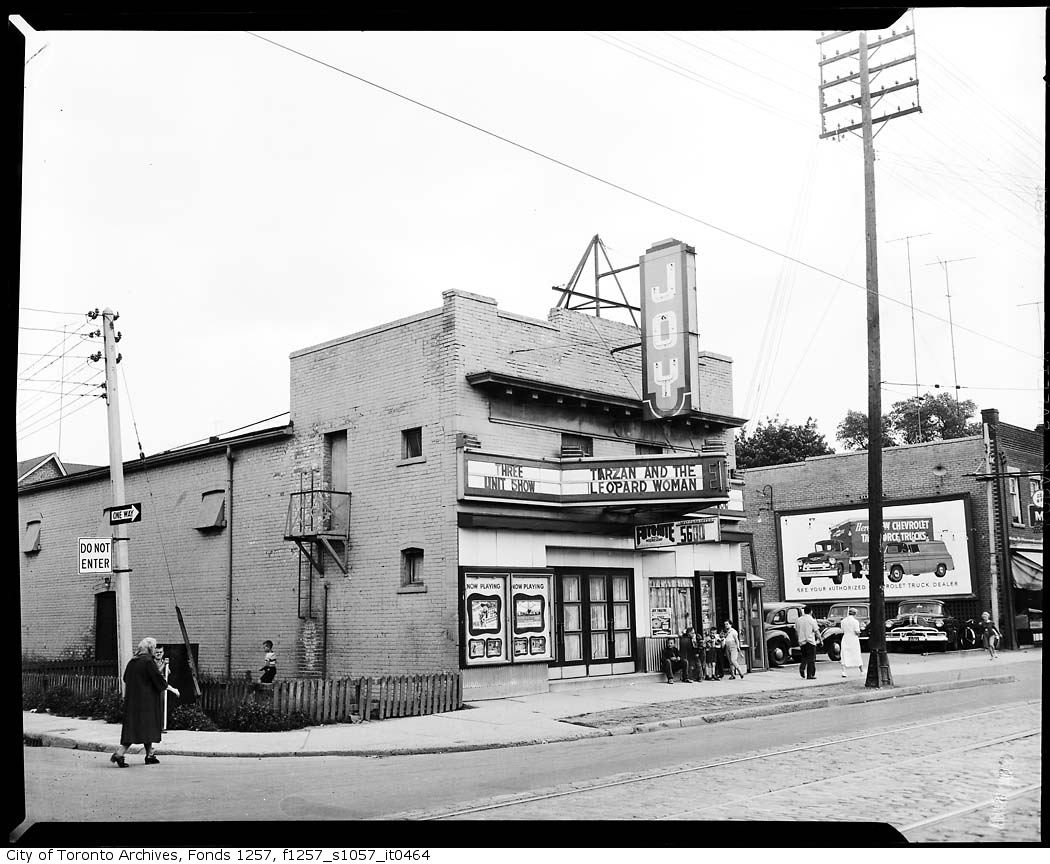
- Interactive map of Joy Theatre
- Former names: Rex Theatre
- Location: 1130 Queen Street East
- Coordinates: 43.66240°N 79.33476°W
- Seating type: single floor, central aisle
- Capacity: 381
- Type: Indoor theatre

Construction
- Opened: 1914

The Joy Theatre (formerly the Rex Theatre) was a small cinema on Toronto's Queen Street East. When built, during World War I the theatre had just 381 seats. In 1941 it was renovated, adding air conditioning, boosting the number of seats to 427, and changing its name from Rex Theatre to Joy Theatre.

The cinema continued to operate for another 12 years. After it stopped operating as a cinema it operated as a strip bar, and as of 2019 it was a restaurant.
