= Westwood Theatre =

Former cinema in Etobicoke, Ontario, Canada

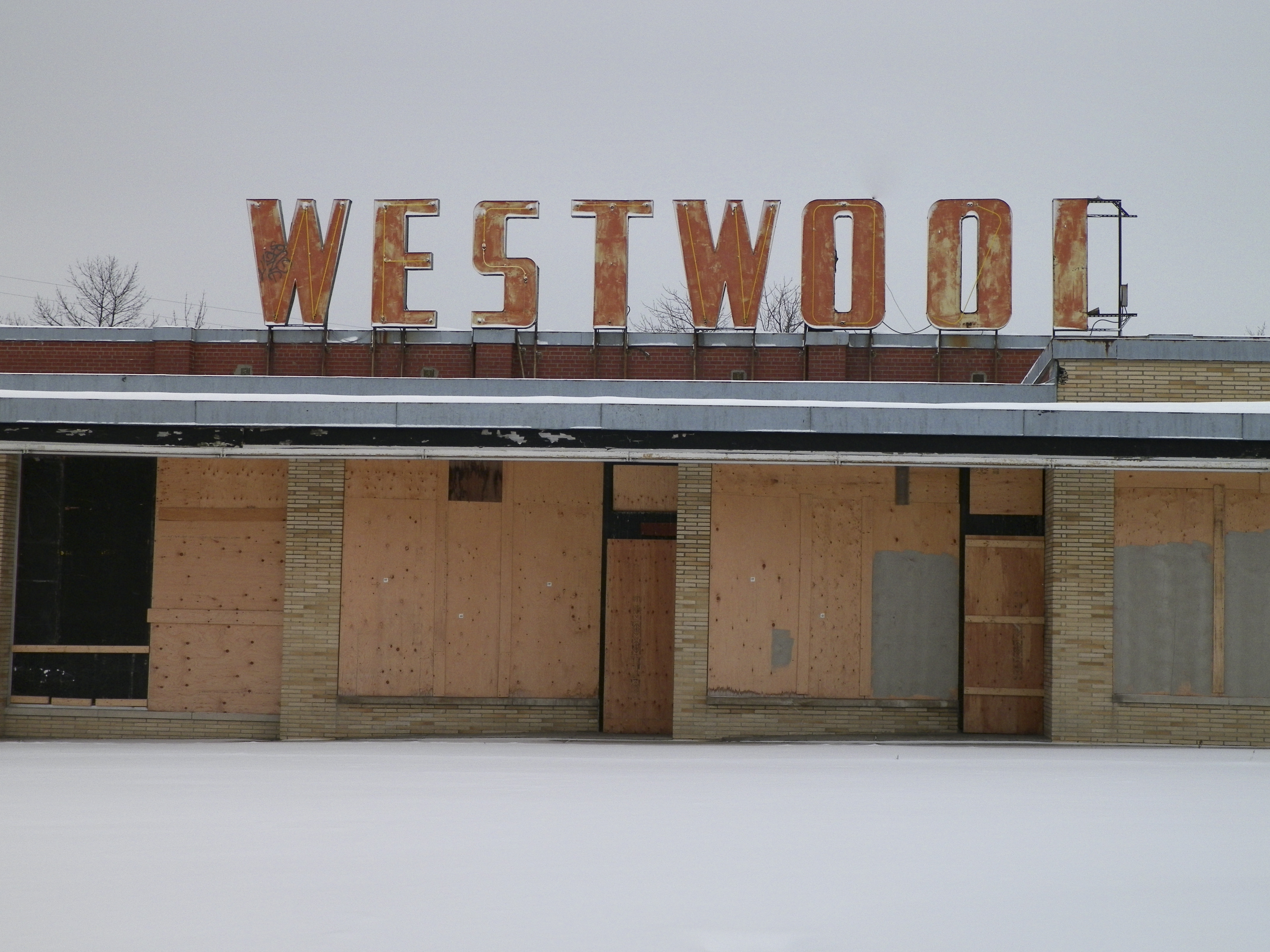
A detail of the Westwood Theatre, in 2012, a year before final demolition. Note: The sign was damaged when the vacant building was used as a set for the 2004 film Resident Evil: Apocalypse.

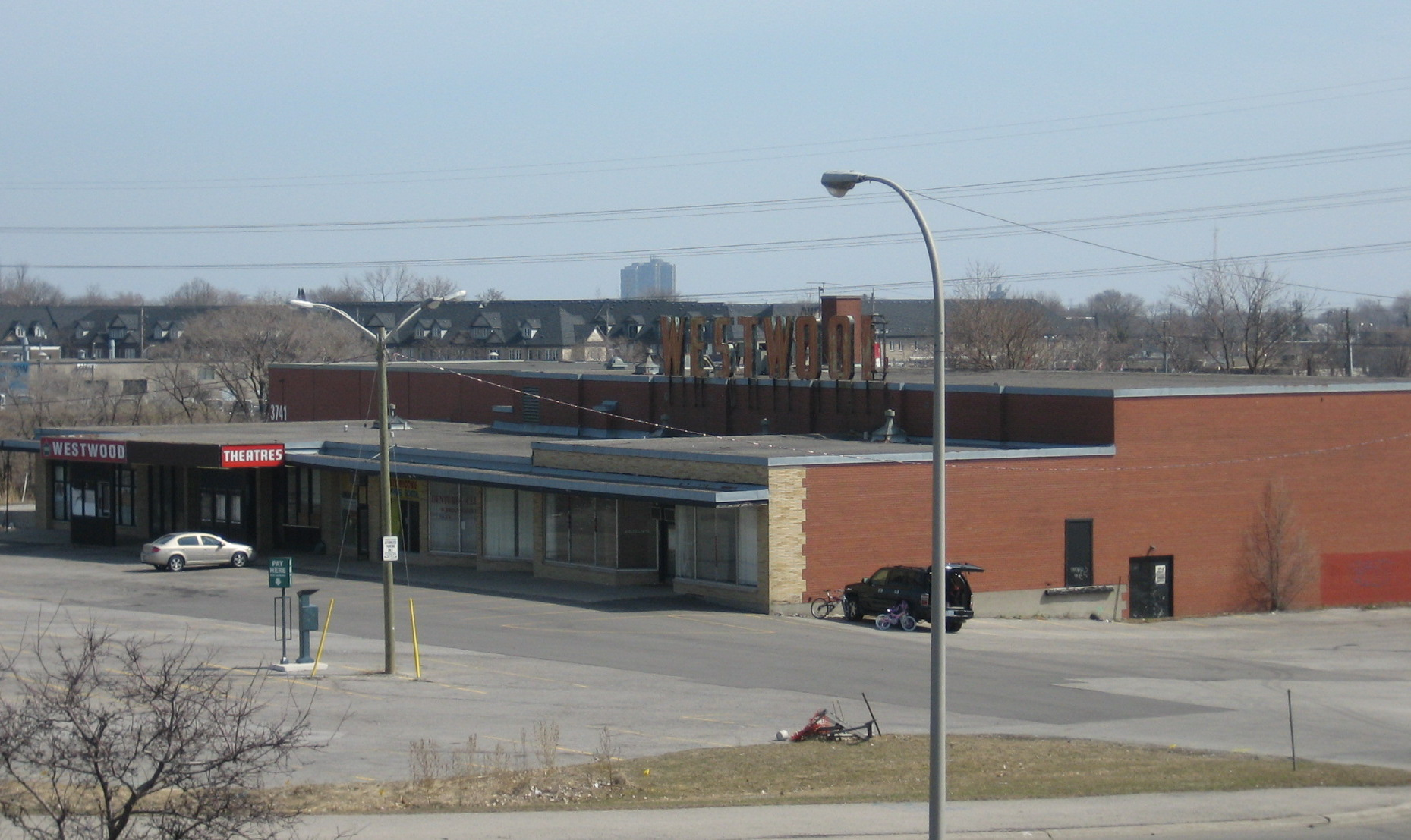

The Westwood Theatre was built in 1951 in Etobicoke, Ontario's Six Points intersection where Kipling Avenue intersects both Bloor and Dundas streets.

When built, the Westwood property was 13.8 acres (5.6 hectares), mainly consisting of a large parking lot. By the time Etobicoke was amalgamated with Toronto, the land the theatre and its parking lot occupied was too valuable to be used as a theatre. The theatre shut its doors in 1998, and lay vacant until 2013. As an independent city before amalgamation, Etobicoke's city hall, and other civic buildings occupied a campus on The West Mall that was only conveniently reached by car, a site which has continued post-amalgamation as a civic and community centre. However, its new civic centre is proposed to be moved to this former Westwood site, within walking distance of the Kipling and Islington subway stations. The site was later demolished and is now used for the Six Points interchange reconfiguration.

According to local cinema historian Doug Taylor, author of Toronto Theaters and the Golden Age of the Silver Screen, the theatre's design was "utilitarian", even though it had been designed by architectural firm Kaplan & Sprachman, which had specialized in designing many of Canada's art deco cinemas.

As originally built, the Westwood had a single auditorium, seating 1,000 patrons. A second auditorium was added in the 1970s.
